= Timeline of World War II (1945) =

1945 in the Second World War

← 1944 Aftermath →
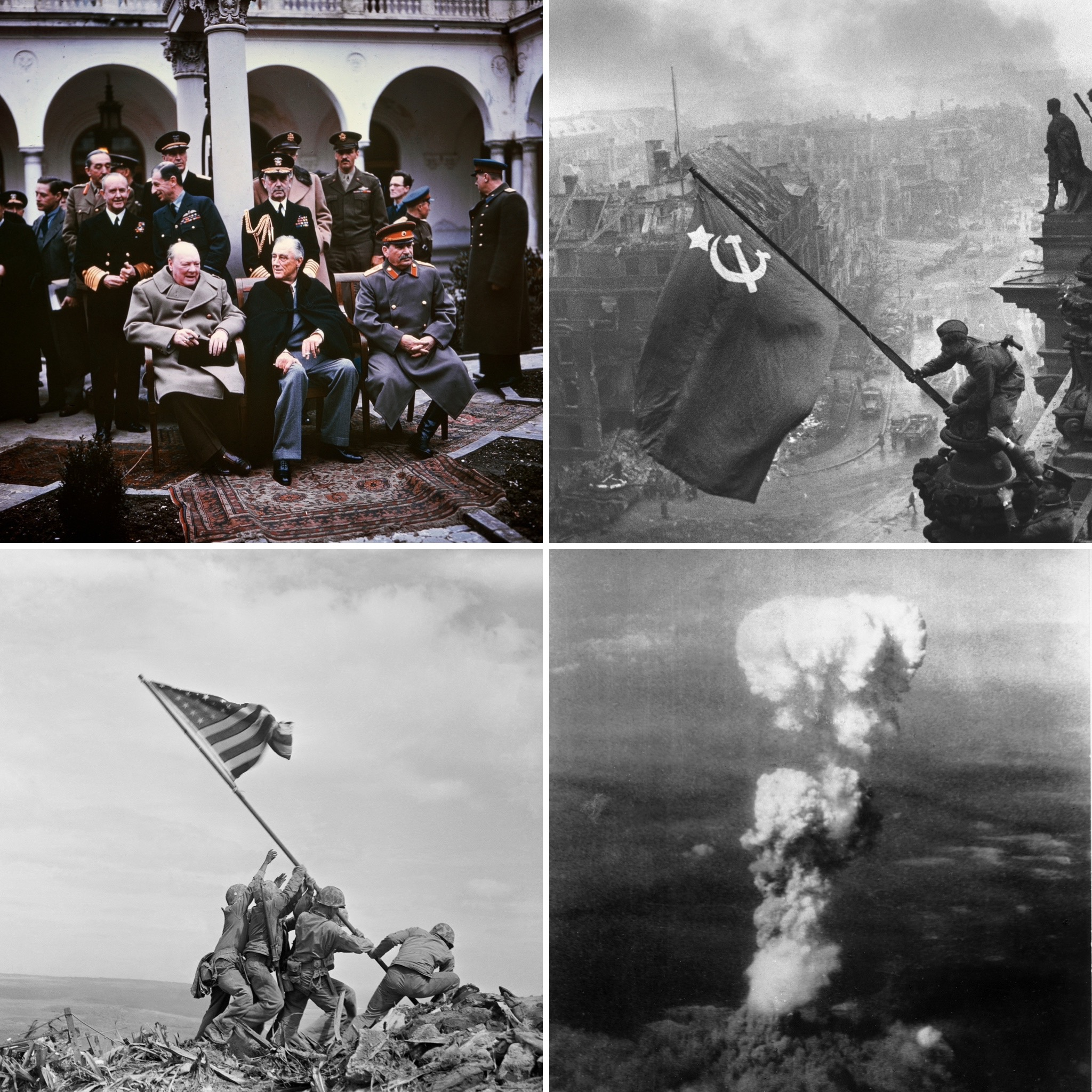
- 1945, clockwise from top left: Allied leaders meet at the Yalta Conference, Soviets raise their flag over the Reichstag, nuclear weapons first used in the bombing of Hiroshima, Americans raise their flag over Iwo Jima
Location	Global

Belligerents
Allies: Soviet Union; Poland (PGRP); United States; Philippines (exiled government); Philippines; United Kingdom; India; New Zealand; Burma; China; Nationalists; Communists; France; Poland (exiled government); Czechoslovakia (exiled government); Czechoslovakia; South Africa; Canada; Australia; Norway (exiled government); Norway; Luxembourg; Netherlands (exiled government); Netherlands; Dutch East Indies; Belgium; Greece; Yugoslavia (exiled government); Yugoslavia; Ethiopia; Mexico; Brazil; Albania; Turkey; Saudi Arabia; Iraq; Iran; Italy; Romania; Bulgaria; Finland	Axis: Germany; General Government; Italian Social Republic; Slovakia; GONU; Japan; Burma; Azad Hind; Thailand; Croatia; Manchukuo

This is a timeline of the events that took place during 1945, the last year of World War II.

== January 1945 ==
January 1945

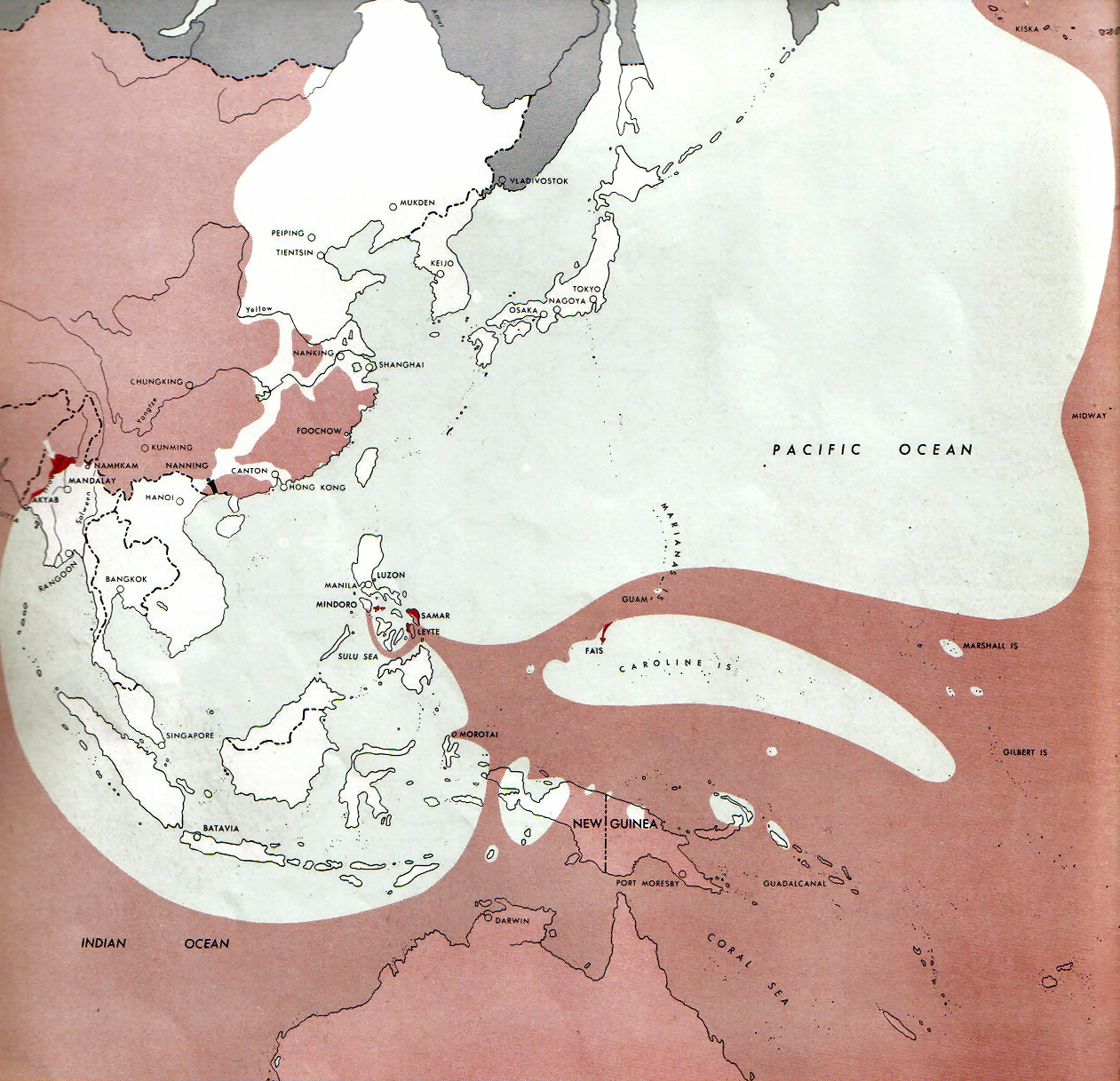
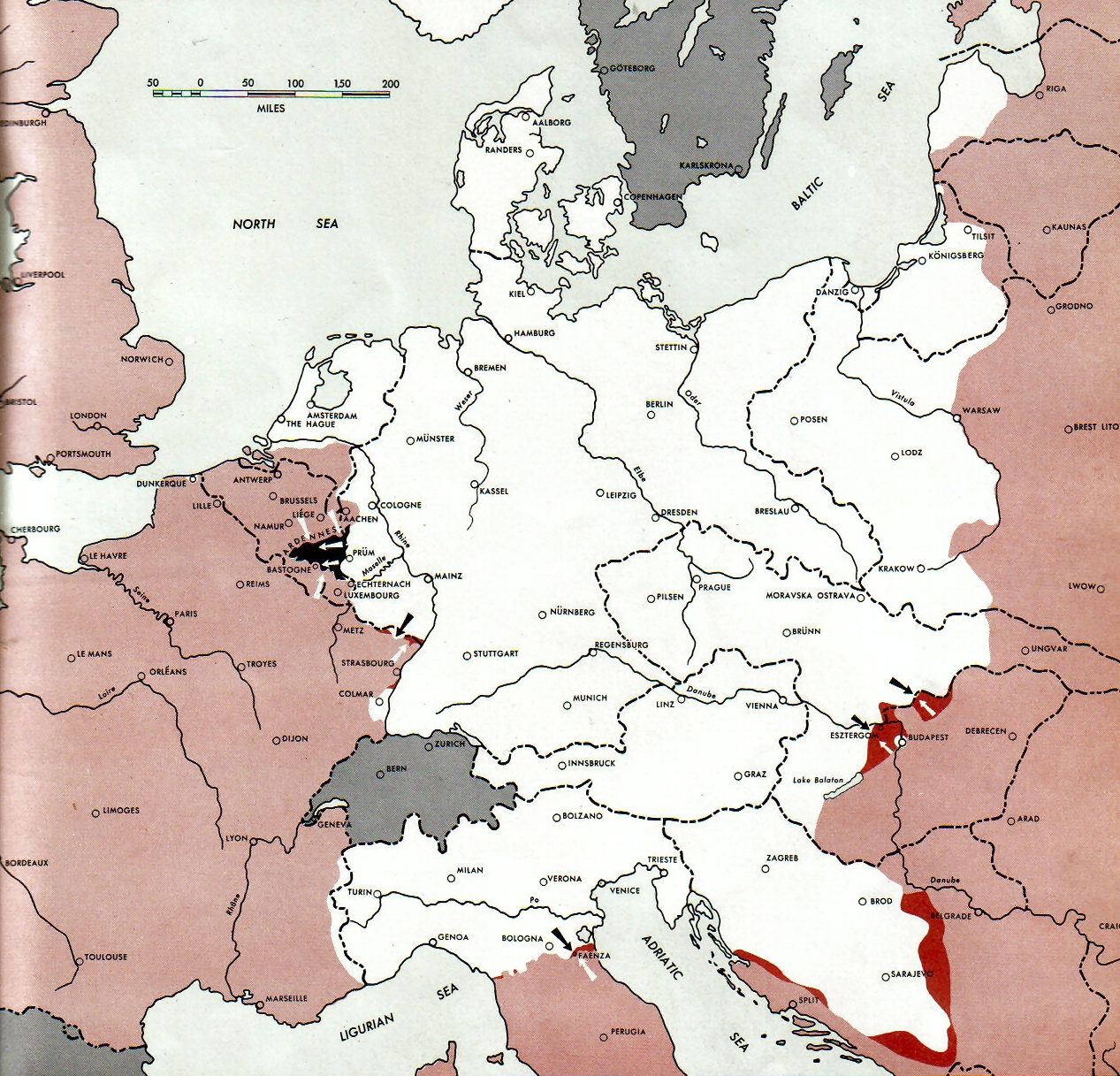
1st

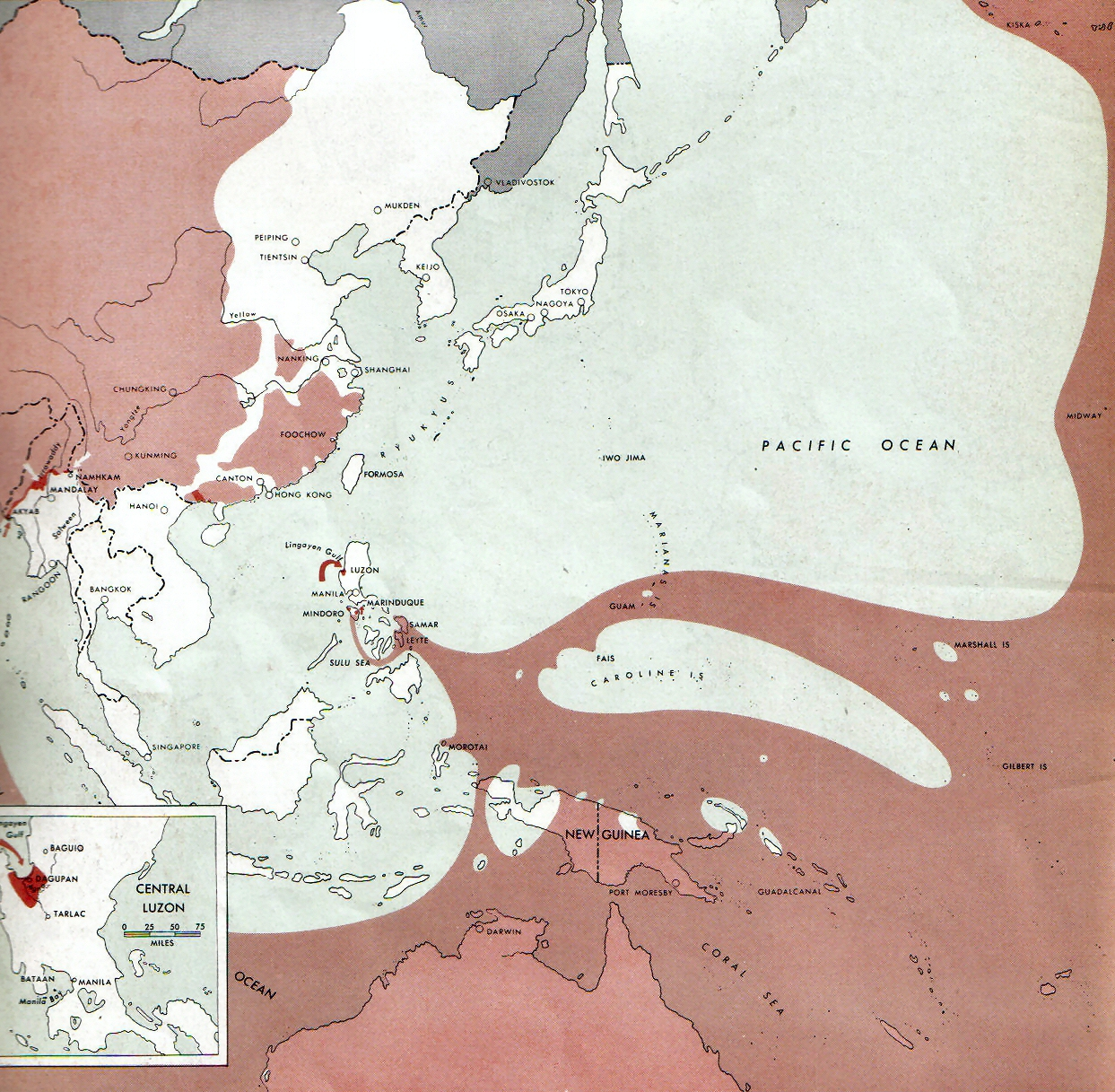
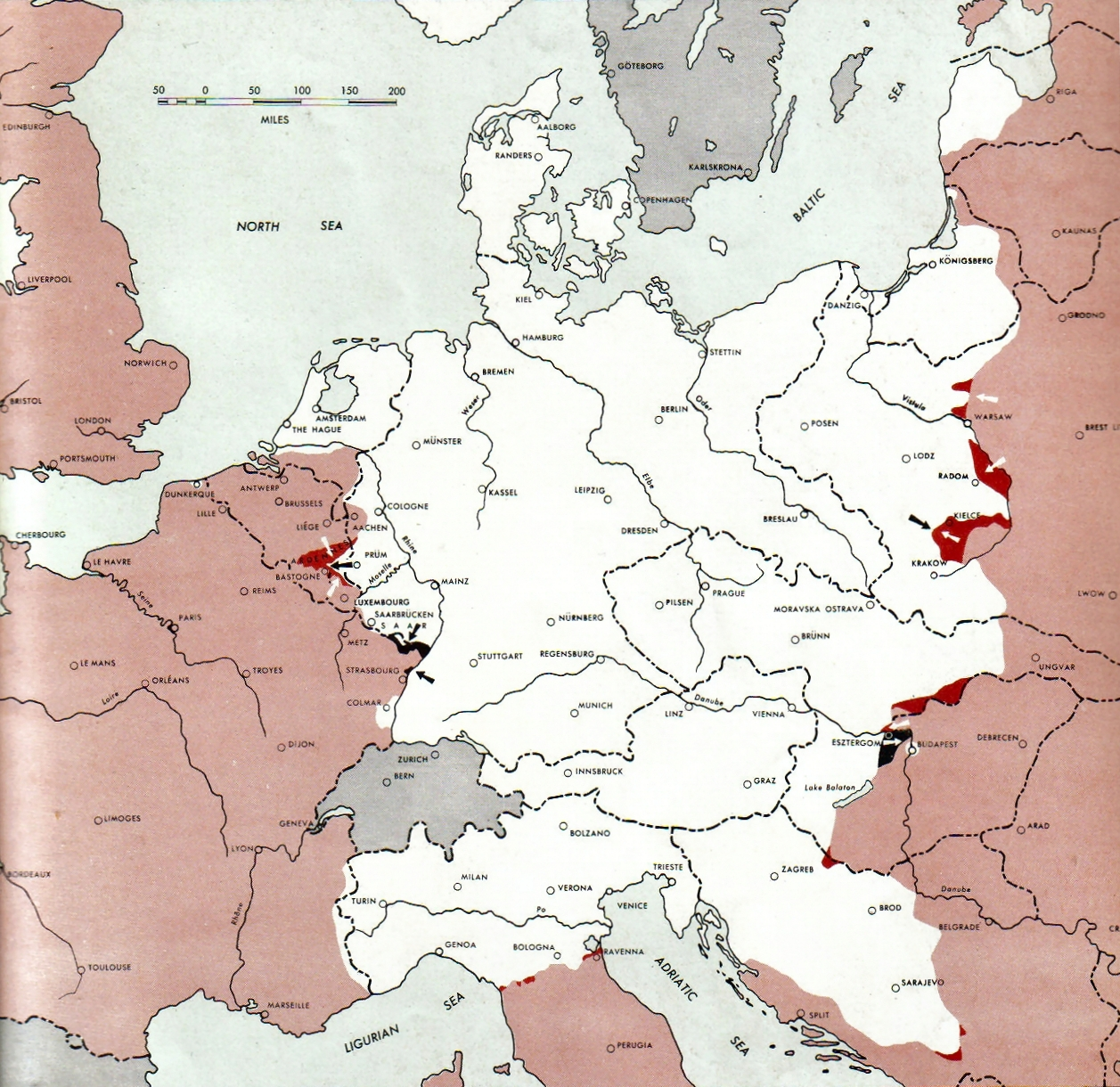
15th

1: The Germans begin a surprise offensive (Operation Nordwind) in northern Alsace.
: Unternehmen Bodenplatte (Operation Baseplate) is launched by the Luftwaffe against western Allied air bases in Belgium and Holland by elements of ten different Jagdgeschwadern (fighter wings), as its last major air offensive of the war in the West.
: American troops kill dozens of German POWs at Chenogne

2: 46 American B-29 bombers based near Calcutta, India attacked a railroad bridge near Bangkok, Thailand and other targets in the area.
: The Japanese increasingly use kamikaze tactics against the US naval forces nearby.

3: The Allies take the offensive east of the Bulge but they fail to close the pincers (which might have surrounded large numbers of Germans) with Patton's tanks.

4: US navy air attacks on Formosa (Taiwan)

5: The German offensive Nordwind crosses the border into Alsace.
: Japanese retreat across the Irrawaddy River in Burma with General Slim's troops in pursuit.

6: American B-29s bomb Tokyo again.

7: Germans, as part of the plan to retake Strasbourg, break out of the "Colmar Pocket", a bridgehead on the Rhine, and head east.

8: The battle of Strasbourg is underway, with Americans in defence of their recent acquisition.

9: Americans land on Luzon. There are more kamikaze attacks on the American navy.

11: The first convoy moves on the Ledo Road (or "Stilwell" road) in northern Burma, linking India and China.

12: The East Prussian Offensive, a major Red Army offensive in East Prussia, begins on January 13th. The Soviet Vistula-Oder Offensive begins. Its goal is to capture Poland and Eastern Germany.

13: 1st Byelorussian Front launched its winter offensive towards Pillkallen, East Prussia, meeting heavy resistance from the German 3rd Panzer Army.

14: British forces clear the Roer Triangle during Operation Blackcock; it is an area noted for its industrial dams.
15: The British commander in Athens, General Ronald Scobie, accepts a request for a ceasefire from the Greek People's Liberation Army. This marks the end of the Dekemvriana, resulting in clear defeat for the Greek Left.

16: The U.S. First and Third Armies link up following the Battle of the Bulge.

17: Warsaw is entered by Red Army troops. A government favourable to the Communists is installed.
: It is announced officially that the Battle of the Bulge is at an end.

19: Hitler orders that any retreats of divisions or larger units must be approved by him.

20: The Red Army advances into East Prussia. Germans renew the retreat.
: Franklin D. Roosevelt is sworn in for a fourth term as U.S. President; Harry Truman is sworn in as Vice President.

23: German jurist and anti-Nazi activist Helmuth James von Moltke was hanged for treason in Berlin.

24: The Battle of Poznań began for the German-occupied stronghold city of Poznań in Poland.

25: The American navy bombards Iwo Jima in preparation for an invasion.

27: Auschwitz concentration camp is liberated by Soviet troops.

28: The Red Army completes the occupation of Lithuania.

30: The Malta Conference (1945) began with Winston Churchill meeting with the Combined Chiefs of Staff on the Island of Malta in the Mediterranean to plan the end of WWII in both Theaters, and to discuss the ramifications of the Soviets now controlling most of Eastern Europe. President Franklin D. Roosevelt would join the Conference for one day on 2 February 1945; both would fly to Yalta on 3 February for the Yalta Conference with Stalin.

31: The Red Army crosses the Oder River into Germany and are now less than 50 miles from Berlin.
: A second invasion on Luzon by Americans lands on the west coast.
: The whole Burma Road is now opened as the Ledo Road linkage with India is complete.

== February 1945 ==
February 1945

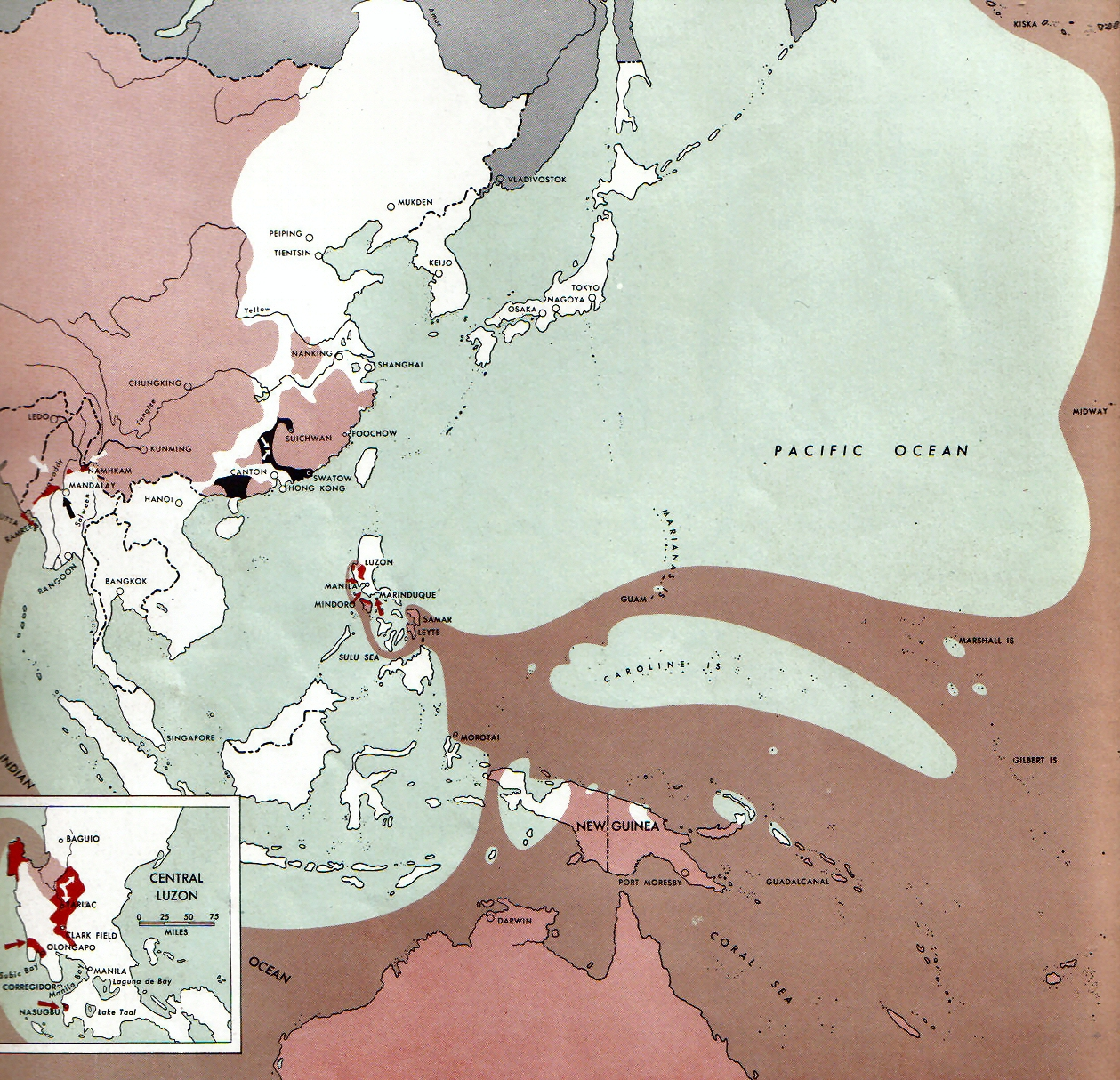
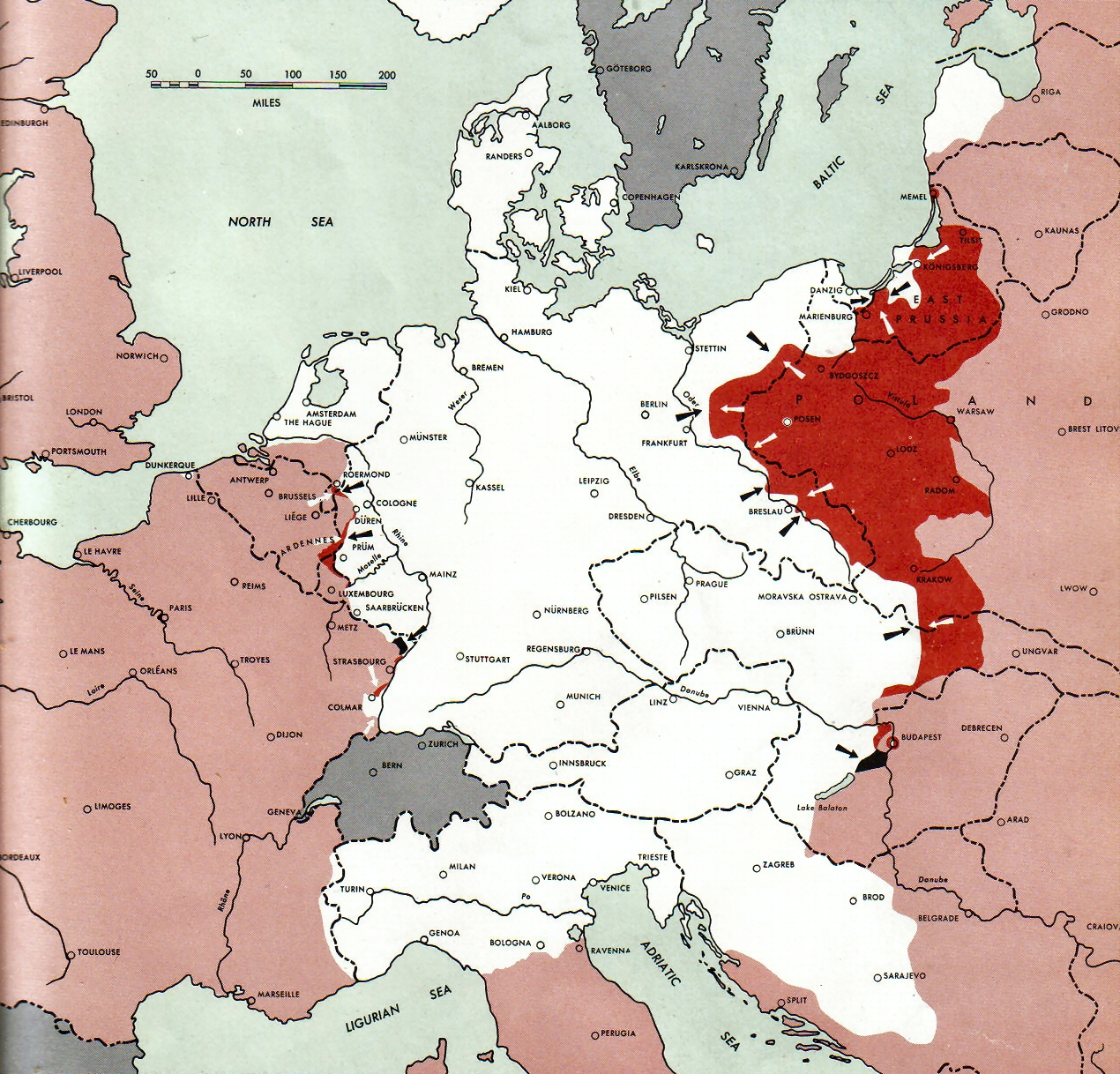
1st

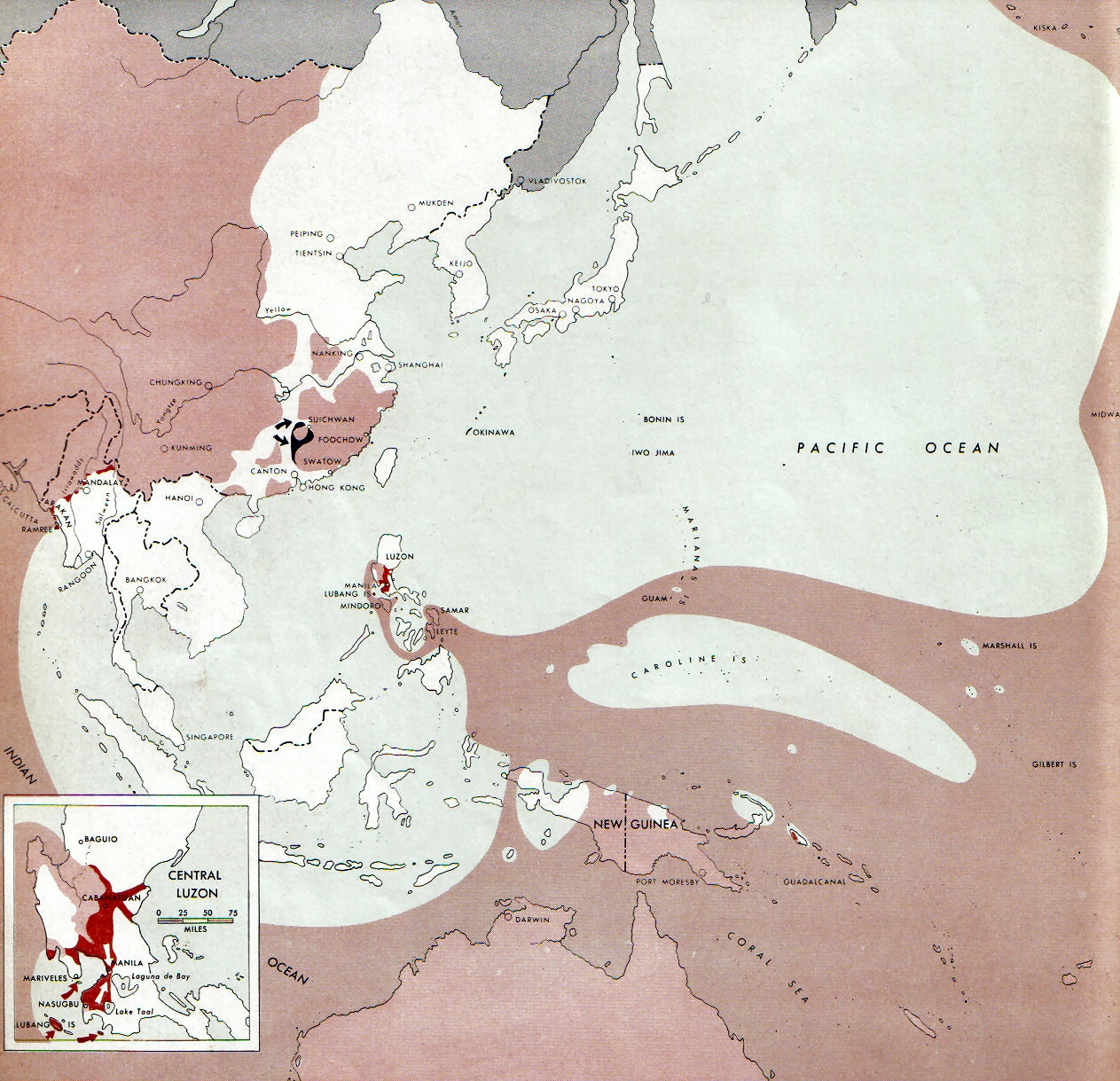
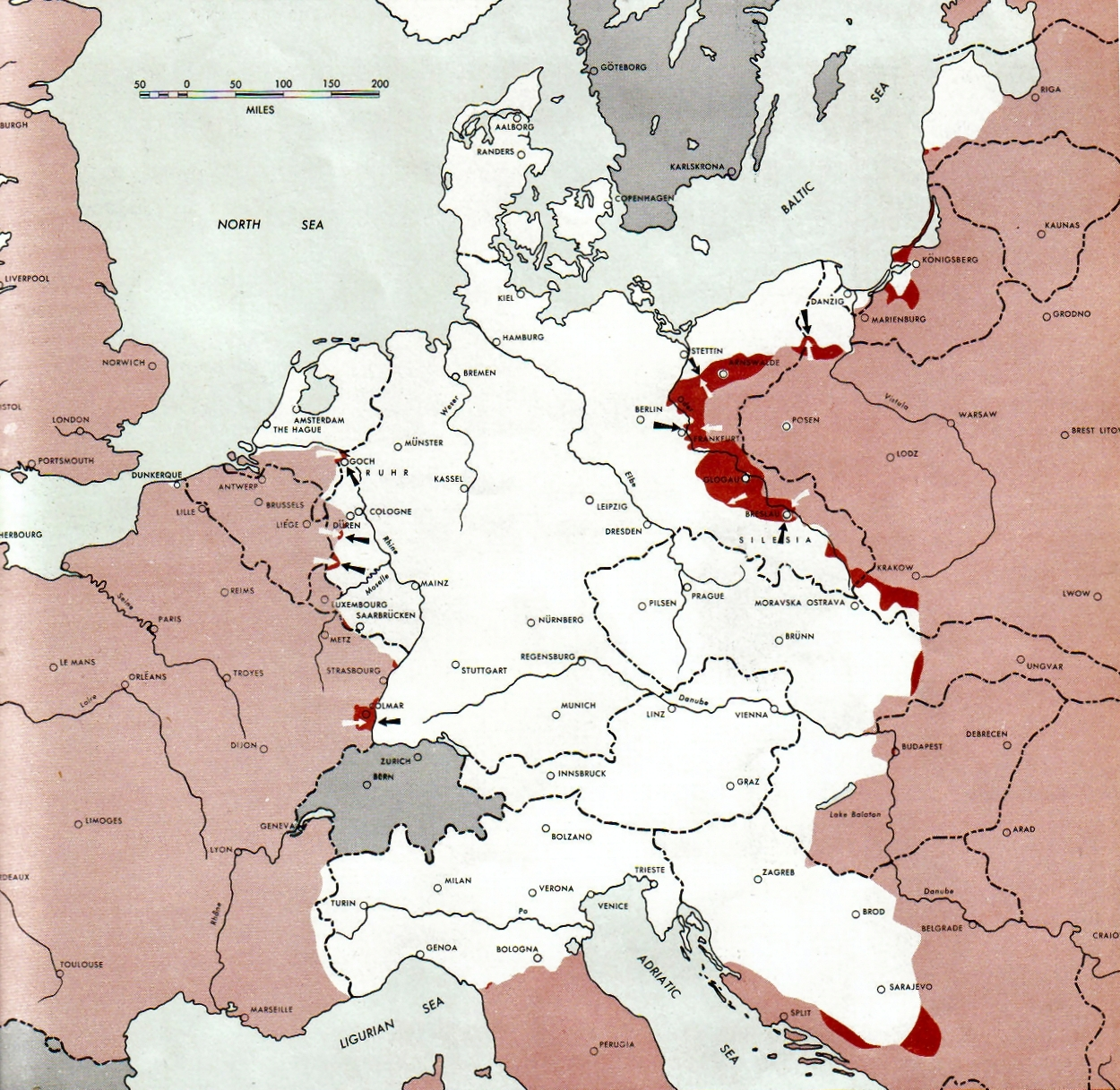
15th

2: Ecuador declares war on Germany and Japan.
: Naval docks at Singapore are destroyed by B-29 attacks.

3: The Battle of Manila (1945) begins: Forces of the U.S. and Philippines enter Manila. The Manila massacre takes place during the fighting.
: Heavy bombing of Berlin. Judge Roland Freisler is killed while trying to save court documents.

4: The Yalta Conference of Roosevelt, Churchill and Stalin begins; the main subject of their discussions is postwar spheres of influence.
: Belgium is now cleared of all German forces.

7: Paraguay declares war on Germany and Japan.

9: The Colmar Pocket, the last German foothold west of the Rhine, is eliminated by the French 1st Army.

12: Peru declares war on Germany and Japan.

13: The Battle of Budapest ends with Soviet victory, after a long defense by the Germans.

13/14: The Bombing of Dresden takes place; it is firebombed by Allied air forces and large parts of the historic city are destroyed.

14: The 1945 Bombing of Prague: American planes bomb the wrong city.

15: Venezuela and Uruguay declare war on Germany and Japan.

16: American paratroopers and Philippine Commonwealth troops land on Corregidor Island, in Manila Bay. Once the scene of the last American resistance in early 1942, it is now the scene of Japanese resistance.
: American naval vessels bombard Tokyo and Yokohama.

19: U.S. Marines invade Iwo Jima.

21. The Brazilian forces and U.S. Army wins the Battle of Monte Castello

22: Operation Clarion, a massive bombing of German rail and other transport infrastructure by approximately 9,000 U.S. and British aircraft takes place, carrying over into 23 February.

23: U.S. Marines raise the American flag on Mount Suribachi on Iwo Jima.
: Turkey declares war on Germany and Japan.
: In the Philippines, U.S. Army forces staged the Raid on Los Baños freeing 2147 Allied military and civilian prisoners from the Japanese.

24: Egypt declares war on the Axis. Moments after making this Declaration before Parliament, Prime Minister Ahmad Maher Pasha is assassinated.

25: Taking off on the 24th, a US B-29 incendiary raid on Tokyo, Japan takes place.

26: Syria declares war on Germany and Japan.
: After ten days of fighting, American and Filipino troops recapture Corregidor.

27: Lebanon declares war on Germany and Japan

28: A Philippine government is established.
: U.S. and Filipino forces invade Palawan, an island of the Philippines.

== March 1945 ==
March 1945

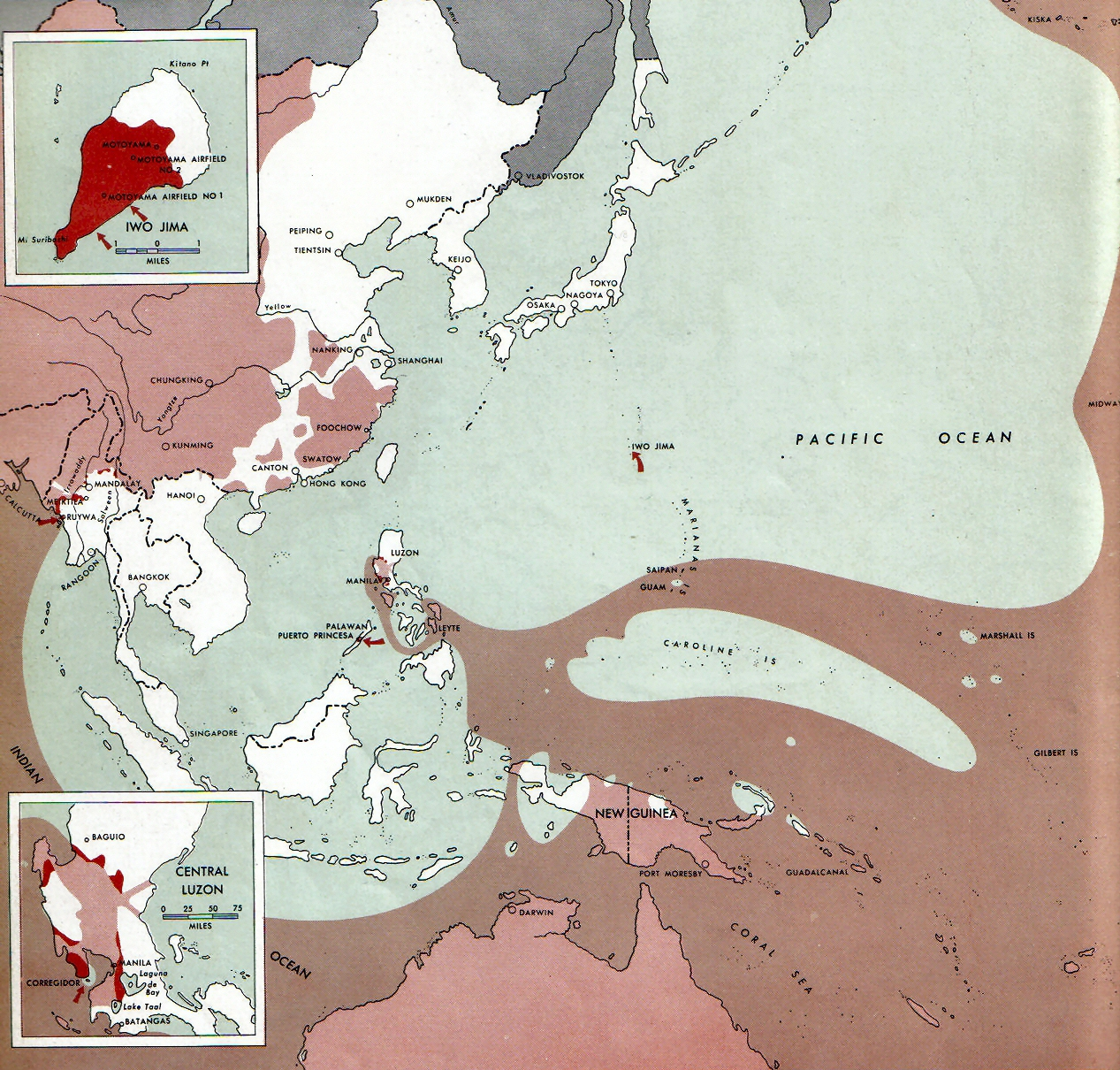
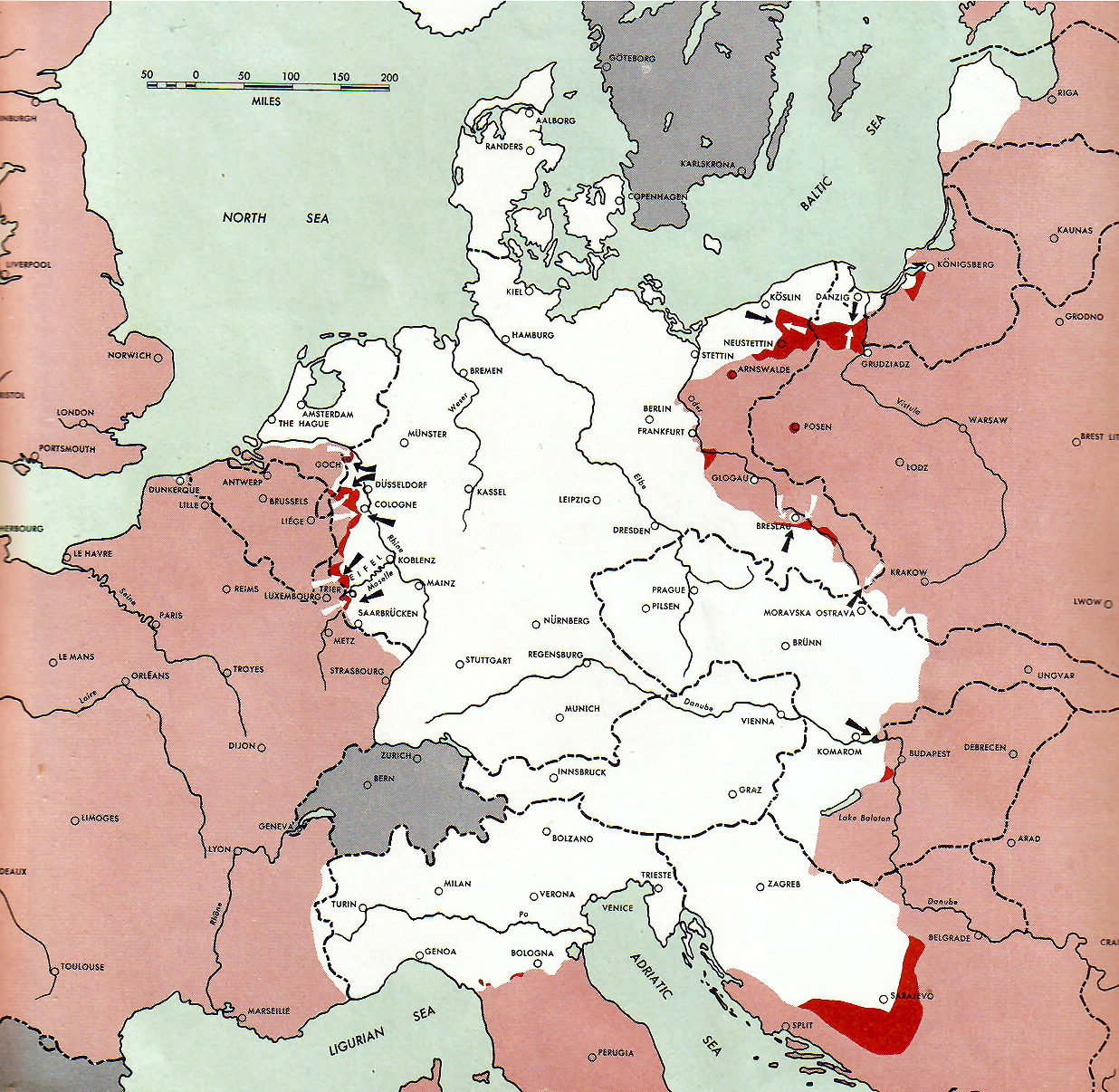
1st

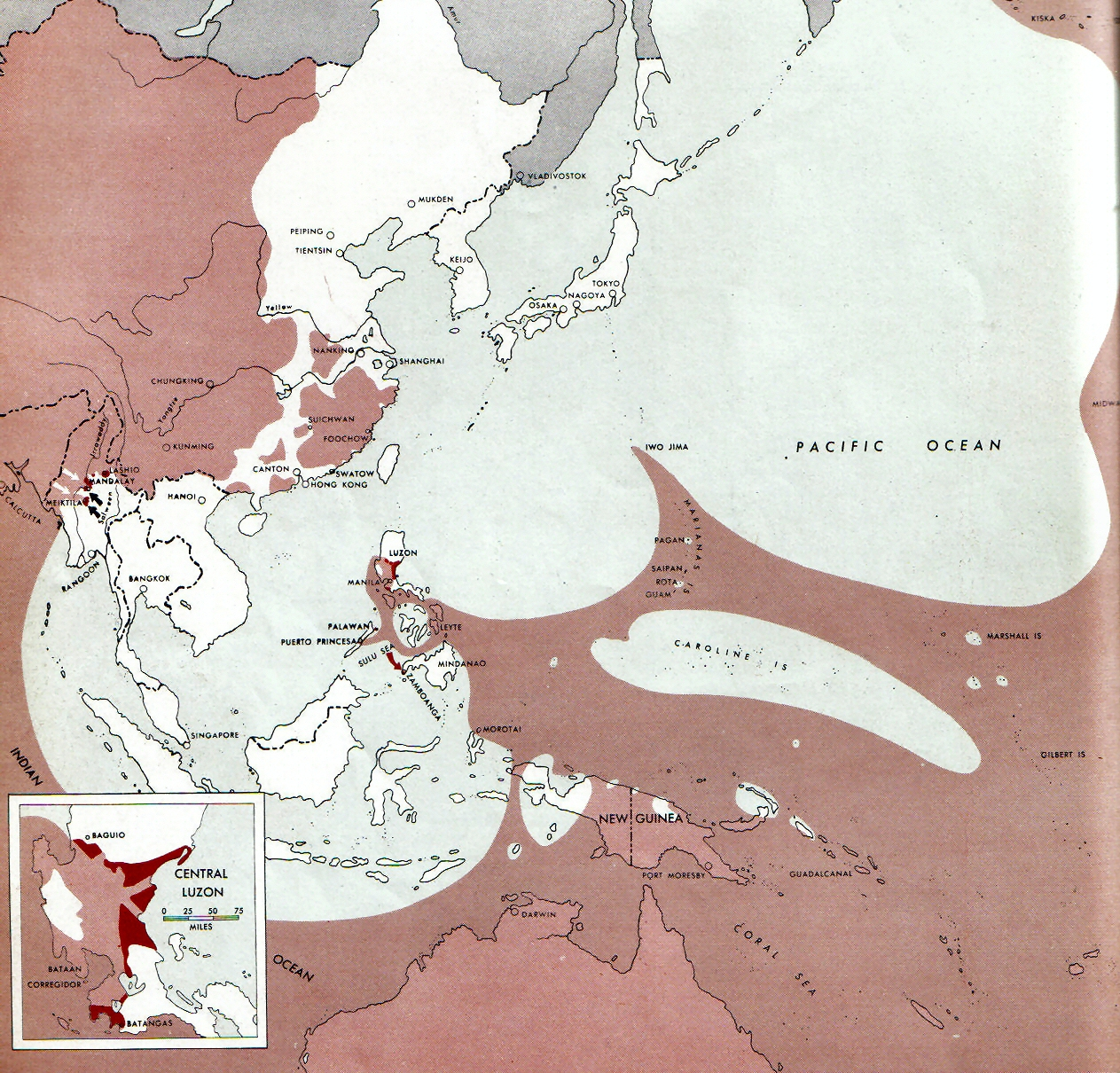
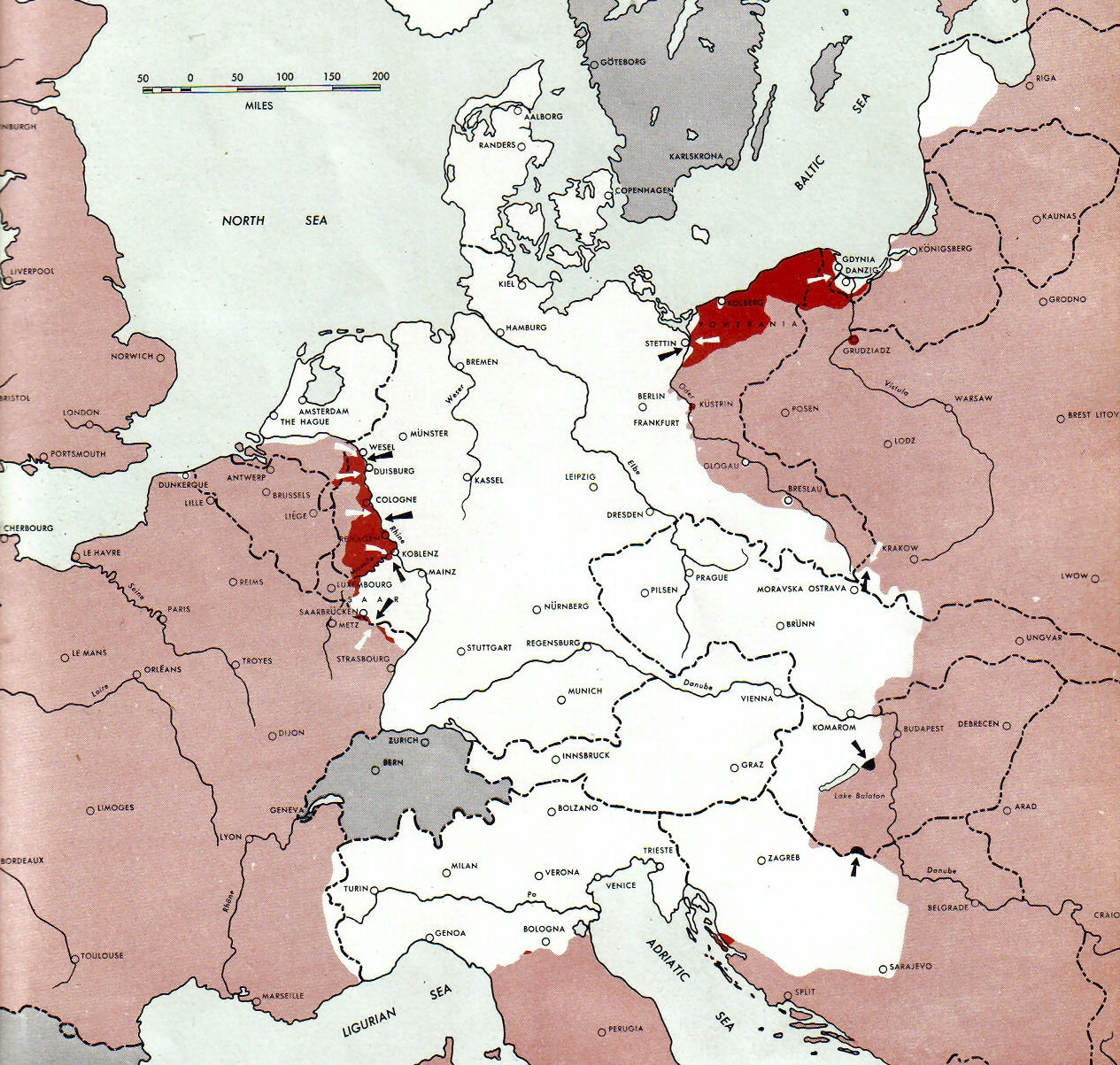
15th

1: Saudi Arabia declares war on Germany and Japan.

3: Manila is fully liberated.
: Battle of Meiktila, Burma comes to an end with General Slim's troops overwhelming the Japanese; the road to Rangoon is now cleared.
: The Allies attempted to destroy V-2s and launching equipment near The Hague by a large-scale bombardment, but due to navigational errors the Bezuidenhout quarter was destroyed, killing 511 Dutch civilians.
: Finland declares war on Germany, backdated to September 15, 1944.

6: Germans launch an offensive against Soviet forces in Hungary.

7: The Battle of Remagen: When German troops fail to dynamite the Ludendorff Bridge over the Rhine, the U.S. First Army captures the bridge and begins crossing the river. The Army also takes Cologne, Germany.
: Germans begin to evacuate Danzig.

8: Private Karl Hulten, an Army Airborne Regiment deserter, was hanged in an English prison for a flurry of crimes ending in what came to be called the Cleft chin murder.

9: The US firebombs Tokyo (the attack was code-named Operation Meetinghouse), with heavy civilian casualties.
: Amid rumours of a possible American invasion, Japanese overthrow the Vichy French Jean Decoux Government which had been operating independently as the colonial government of Vietnam: they proclaim an "independent" Empire of Vietnam, with Emperor Bảo Đại as nominal ruler. Premier Trần Trọng Kim forms the first Vietnamese government.

10: Japanese Fu-Go balloon bombs damage the Manhattan Project's Hanford Site in Washington State slightly, but cause no lasting effects.

11: Nagoya, Japan is firebombed by hundreds of B-29s.

15: V-2 rockets continue to hit England and Belgium.

16: The German offensive in Hungary ends with another Soviet victory.
: Iwo Jima is finally secured after a month's fighting, in the war's only Marine battle where the number of American casualties is larger than the Japanese's. Sporadic fighting will continue as isolated Japanese fighters emerge from caves and tunnels.

18: Red Army approaches Danzig (postwar Gdańsk).

19: U.S. Carrier Task Force 58 conducts heavy bombing of important naval bases in Japan, Kobe and Kure. Fifty miles off Japan, the carrier USS Franklin (CV-13) is hit by two bombs, killing hundreds and disabling the ship for the remainder of the war.
: Deutsch Schutzen massacre occurs, in which 60 Jews are killed.

20: German General Gotthard Heinrici replaces Heinrich Himmler as commander of Army Group Vistula, the army group directly opposing the Soviet advance towards Berlin.
: Mandalay liberated by the Indian 19th Infantry Division.
: Tokyo is firebombed again.
: Patton's troops capture Mainz, Germany.

21: Operation Carthage, a British air raid on a Gestapo headquarters in Copenhagen, Denmark, in support of the Danish resistance movement takes place.

22-23: US and British forces cross the Rhine at Oppenheim.

23: By this time it is clear that Germany is under attack from all sides.

24: Operation Varsity, an Anglo-American-Canadian airborne assault under Montgomery deployed over the Rhine at Wesel.

27: The Western Allies slow their advance and allow the Red Army to take Berlin.
: Argentina declares war on Germany, the last Western hemisphere country to do so; its policies for sheltering escaping Nazis are also coming under scrutiny. Argentina had not declared war before due to British wishes that Argentine shipping be neutral (and therefore Argentine foodstuffs would reach Britain unharmed), this, however, went against the plan of the USA, who applied much political pressure on Argentina.

29: The Red Army enters Austria. Other Allies take Frankfurt; the Germans are in a general retreat all over the centre of the country.

30: Red Army forces capture Danzig.

31: General Eisenhower broadcasts a demand for the Germans to surrender.

== April 1945 ==
April 1945

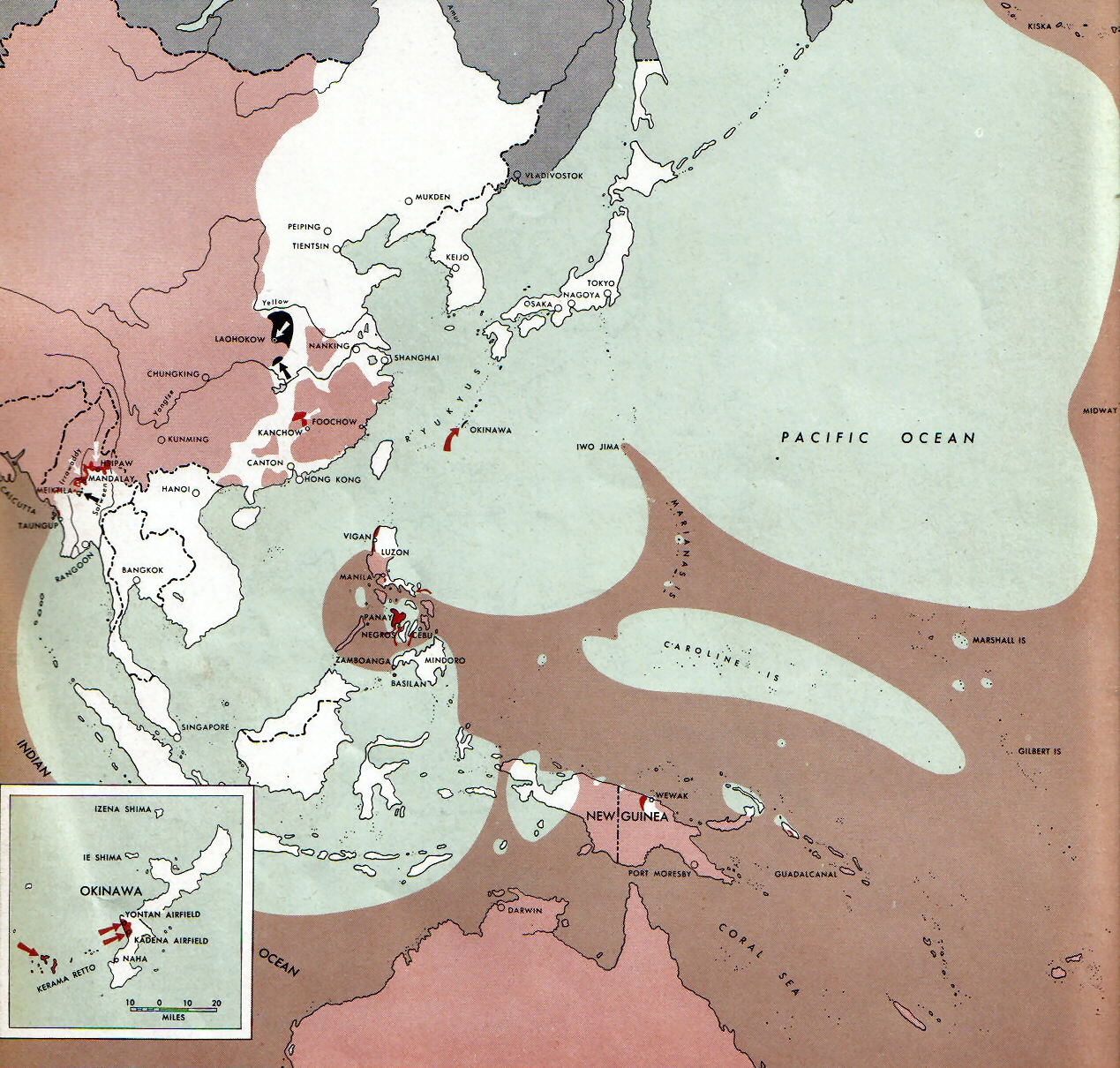
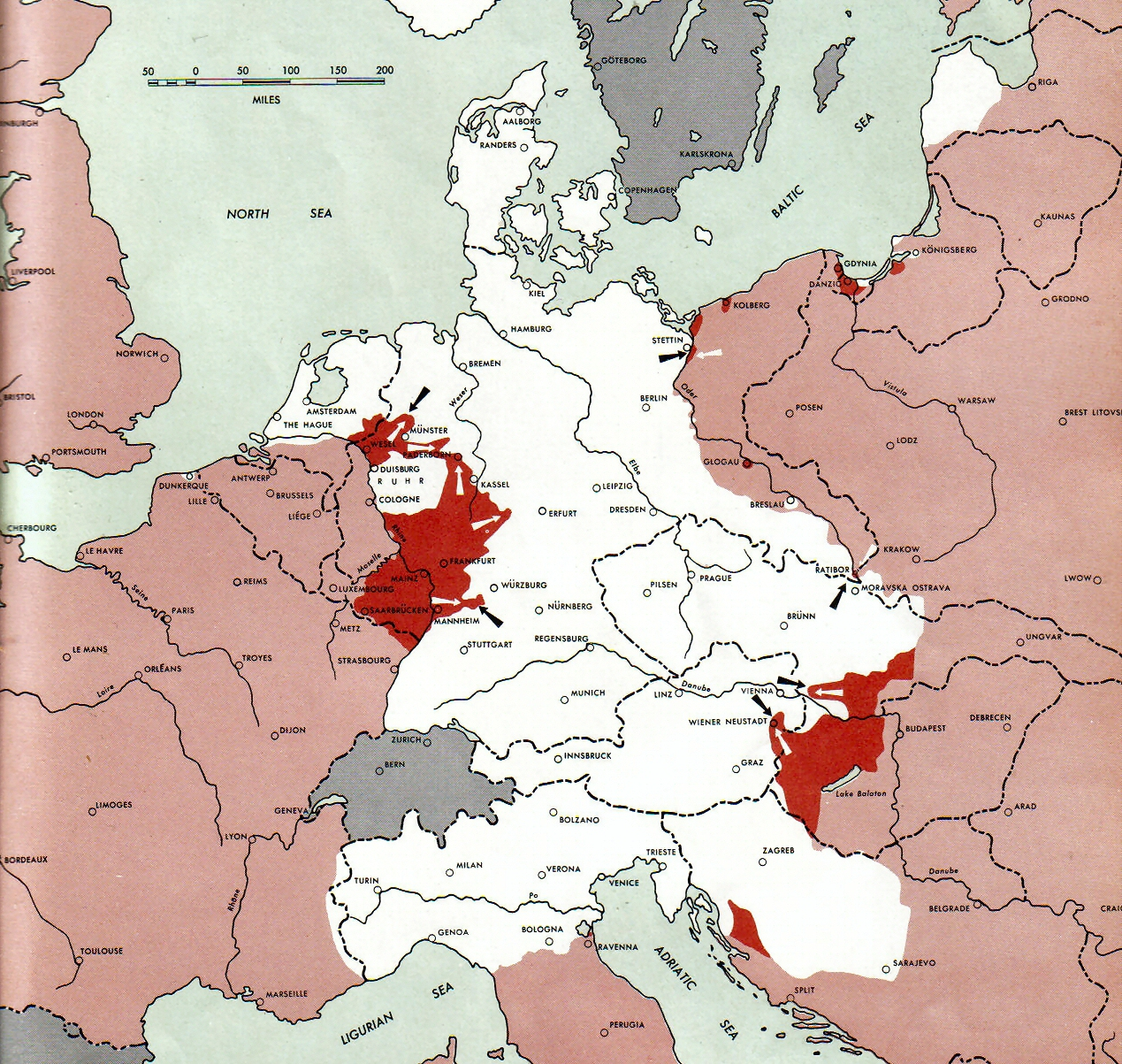
1st

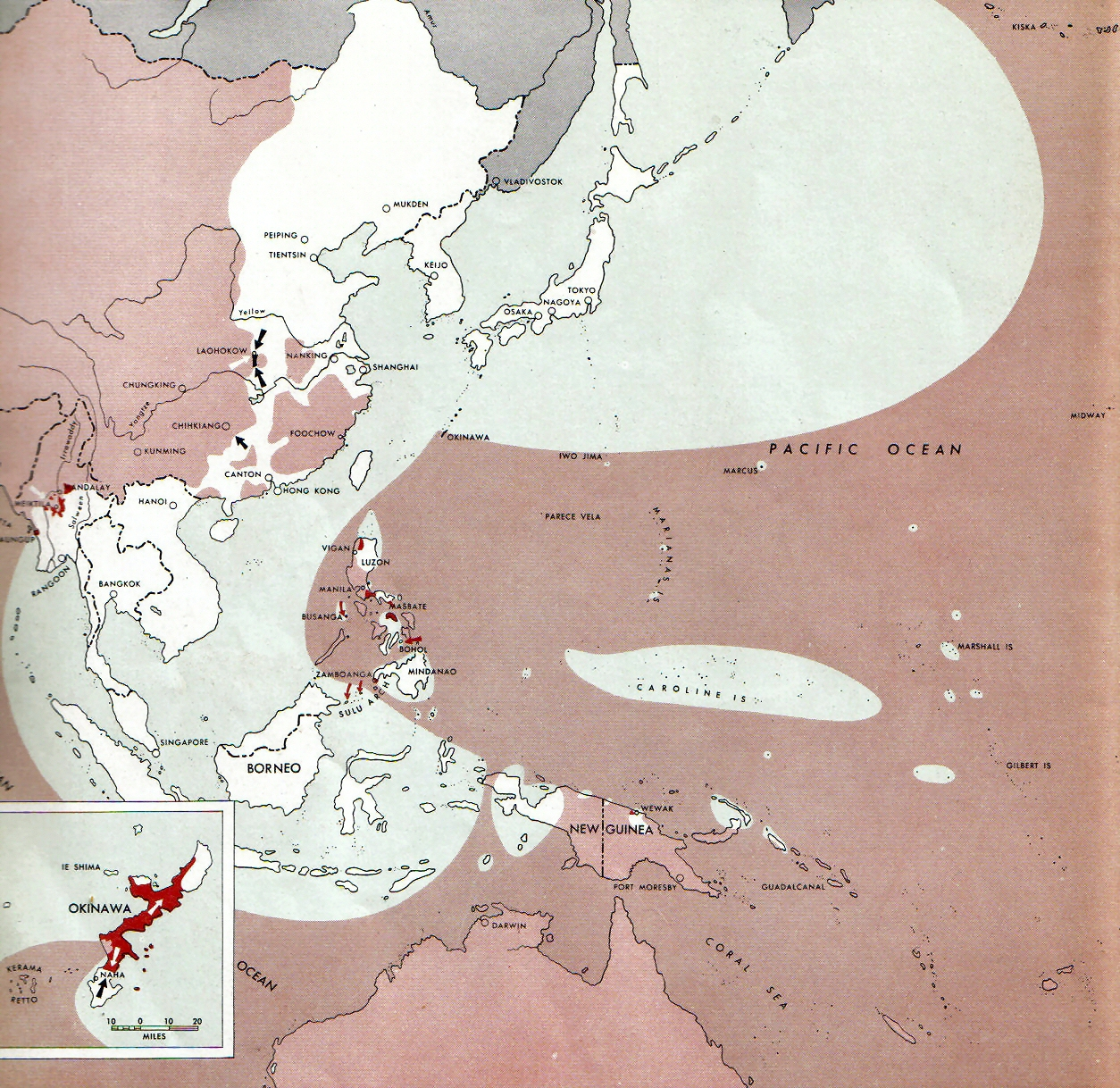
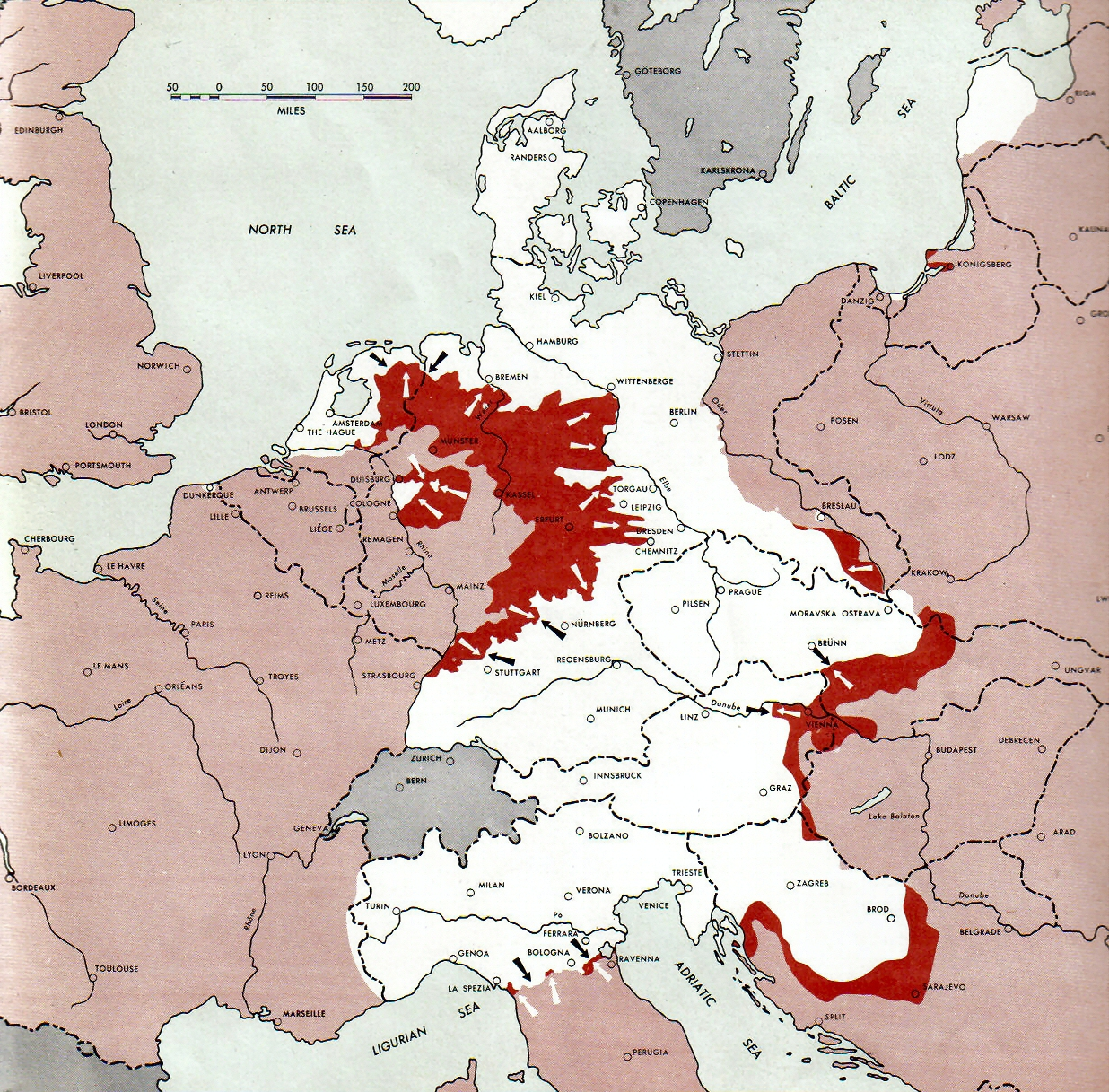
15th

1: U.S. troops start Operation Iceberg, which is the Battle of Okinawa. It would have been a leaping off base for a mainland invasion.
: Americans retake Legaspi, Albay in the Philippines.

2: Soviets launch the Vienna Offensive against German forces in and around the Austrian capital city.
: German armies are surrounded in the Ruhr Pocket.

4: Bratislava, the capital of the Slovak Republic, is overrun by advancing Soviet forces. The remaining members of President Jozef Tiso's pro-German government flee to Austria.
: The Ohrdruf death camp is liberated by the Allies.

6: The Spring 1945 offensive in Italy begins in northern Italy.

7: The Japanese battleship Yamato is sunk in the waters north of Okinawa as the Japanese make their last major naval operation.

9: The Battle of Königsberg ends in a Soviet victory. Having been bombed and under siege for weeks, the people living there as well as soldiers in Konigsberg surrender.
: A heavy bombing at Kiel by the RAF destroys the last two major German warships, the heavy cruisers Admiral Hipper and Admiral Scheer.
: Pastor Dietrich Bonhoeffer is executed at Flossenburg prison.

10: Buchenwald concentration camp is liberated by American forces.

11: Japanese kamikaze attacks on American naval ships continue at Okinawa; the carrier Enterprise and the battleship Missouri are hit.
: Spain breaks off diplomatic relations with Japan.

12: U.S. President Franklin D. Roosevelt dies suddenly. Harry S. Truman becomes president of the United States.

13: The Vienna Offensive ends with a Soviet victory.
: Gardelegen Massacre takes place. Over 1000 slave laborers were closed in a barn which then was set on fire. It was one of the last massacres on civil population perpetrated by Germans. Just a few hours later, American troops captured Gardelegen

14: Large-scale firebombing of Tokyo.

15: Bergen-Belsen concentration camp is liberated by the British Army.

16: The Battle of the Seelow Heights and the Battle of the Oder-Neisse begin as the Soviets continue to advance towards the city of Berlin.

17: The Italian town of Montese is liberated by Brazilian forces after four-day Battle of Montese.

18: Ernie Pyle, famed war correspondent for the GIs, is killed by machine gun fire on Ie Shima, a small island near Okinawa.

19: Switzerland closes its borders with Germany (and the former Austria).
: Allies continue their sweep toward the Po Valley.
: The Soviet advance towards the city of Berlin continues and soon reaches the suburbs.

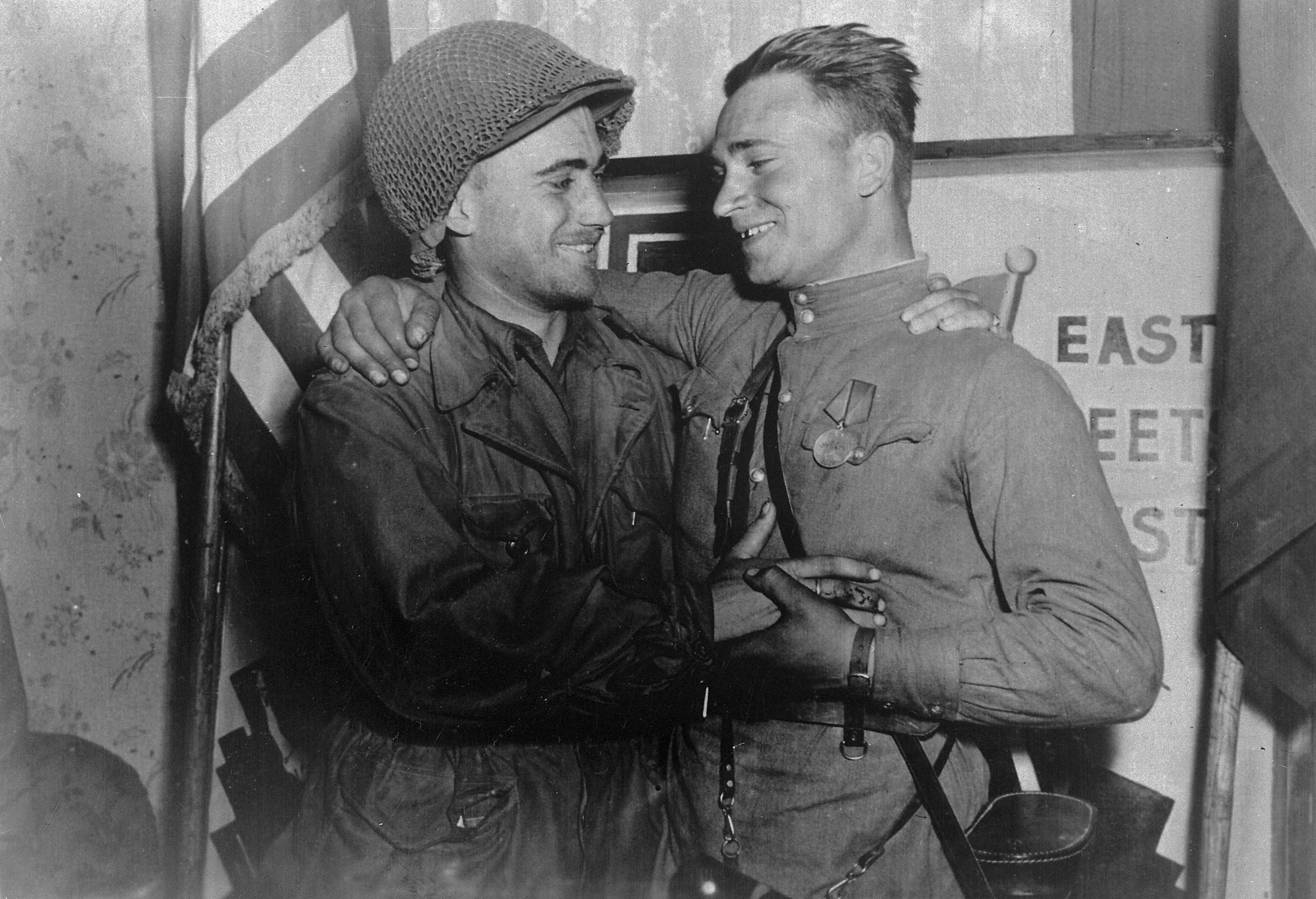
Happy 2nd Lt. William Robertson and Lt. Alexander Sylvashko, Red Army, shown in front of sign "East Meets West" symbolizing the historic meeting of the Red Army and American armies, near Torgau, Germany on Elbe Day.

20: Hitler celebrates his 56th birthday in the bunker in Berlin; reports are that he is in an unhealthy state, nervous, and depressed.

21: Soviet forces under Georgiy Zhukov's (1st Belorussian Front), Konstantin Rokossovskiy's (2nd Belorussian Front) and Ivan Konev's (1st Ukrainian Front) launch assaults on the German forces in and around the city of Berlin in the opening stages of the Battle of Berlin.
: Hitler orders SS-General Felix Steiner to attack the 1st Belorussian Front and destroy it. The ragtag units of "Army Detachment Steiner" are not fully manned.

22: Hitler is informed late in the day that, with the approval of Gotthard Heinrici, Steiner's attack was never launched. Instead, Steiner's forces were authorised to retreat. In response, Hitler launches a furious tirade against the perceived treachery and incompetence of his military commanders in front of Wilhelm Keitel, Hans Krebs, Alfred Jodl, Wilhelm Burgdorf and Martin Bormann. Hitler's tirade culminates in an oath to stay in Berlin to head up the defence of the city. Hitler orders General Walther Wenck to attack towards Berlin with the Twelfth Army, link up with the Ninth Army of General Theodor Busse, and relieve the city. Wenck launched an attack, but it will come to nothing.

23: Hermann Göring sends a radiogram to Hitler's bunker, asking to be declared Hitler's successor. He proclaims that if he gets no response by 10 PM, he will assume Hitler is incapacitated and assume leadership of the Reich. Furious, Hitler strips him of all his offices and expels him from the Nazi Party.
: Albert Speer makes one last visit to Hitler, informing him that he (Speer) ignored the Nero Decree for scorched earth.

24: Himmler, ignoring the orders of Hitler, makes a secret surrender offer to the Allies, (led by Count Folke Bernadotte, head of the Red Cross), provided that the Red Army is not involved. The offer is rejected; when Hitler hears of the betrayal on the 28th, he orders Himmler shot.
: Forces of the 1st Belorussian Front and the 1st Ukrainian Front link up in the initial encirclement of Berlin.
: Allies encircle the last German armies near Bologna, and the Italian campaign in effect comes to an end.

25: Elbe Day: First contact between Soviet and American troops at the river Elbe, near Torgau in Germany.

26: Hitler summons Field Marshal Robert Ritter von Greim from Munich to Berlin to take over command of the Luftwaffe from Göring. While flying into Berlin, von Greim is seriously wounded by Soviet anti-aircraft fire.

27: The encirclement of German forces in Berlin is completed by the 1st Belorussian Front and the 1st Ukrainian Front.
: The last German formations withdraw to Norway from Finland; the Finnish flag is raised at the three-country cairn in celebration.
: Head of State for the Italian Social Republic, Benito Mussolini, heavily disguised, is captured in northern Italy while trying to escape to Switzerland.

28: Mussolini and his mistress Clara Petacci, are shot, and hanged by the feet upside down in Milan. Other members of his puppet government are also executed by Italian partisans and their bodies put on display.

The 148th German Division surrender to Brazilian Expeditionary Division.

29: Dachau concentration camp is liberated by the U.S. 7th Army.
: All forces in Italy officially surrender and a ceasefire is declared.
: Allied air forces commence Operations Manna and Chowhound, providing food aid to the Netherlands under a truce made with occupying German forces.
: Hitler marries his companion Eva Braun.

30: Hitler and his wife commit suicide with a combination of poison and a gunshot. Before he dies, he dictates his last will and testament. In it Joseph Goebbels is appointed Reich Chancellor and Grand Admiral Karl Dönitz is appointed Reich President.

== May 1945 ==
May 1945

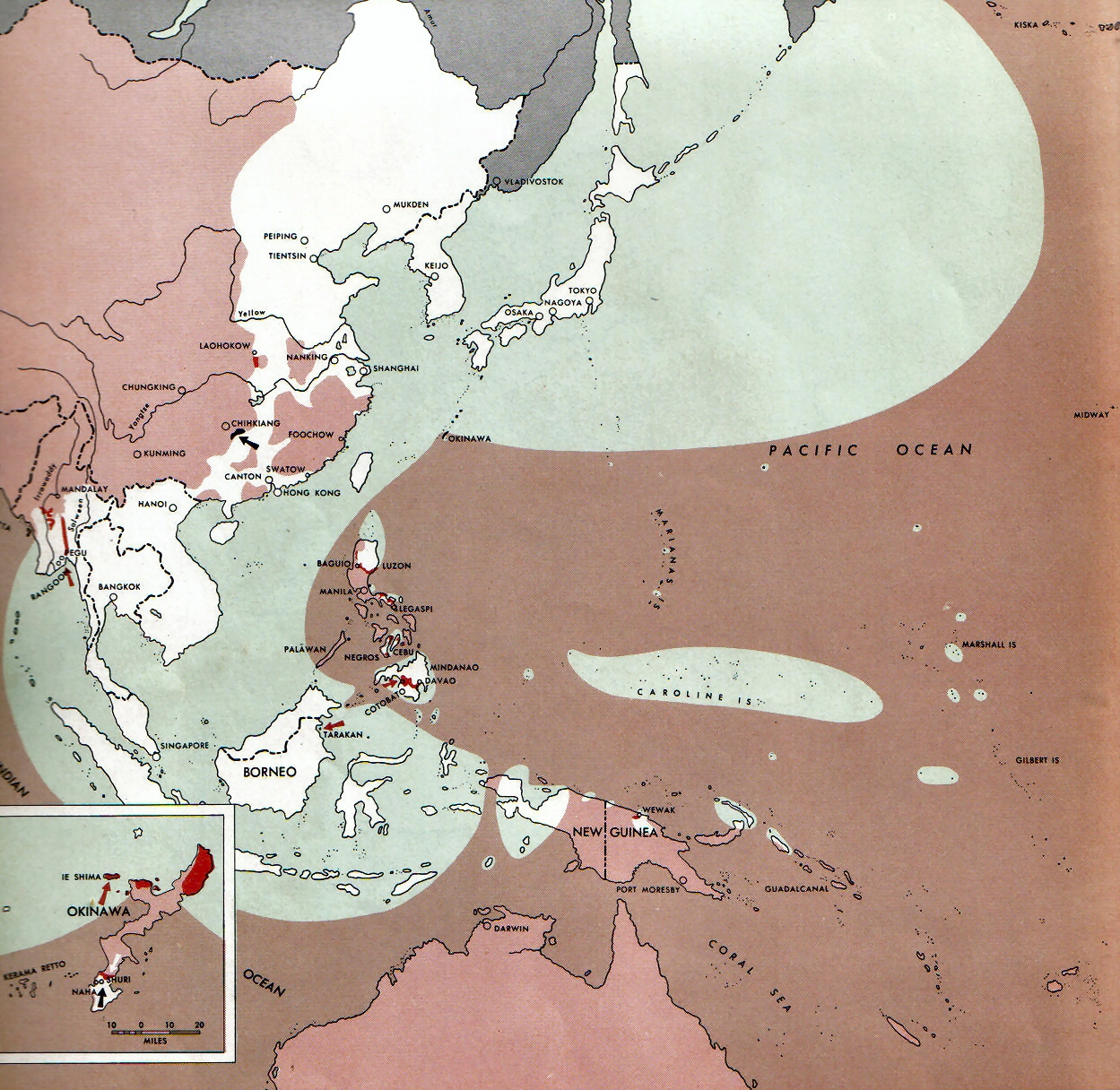
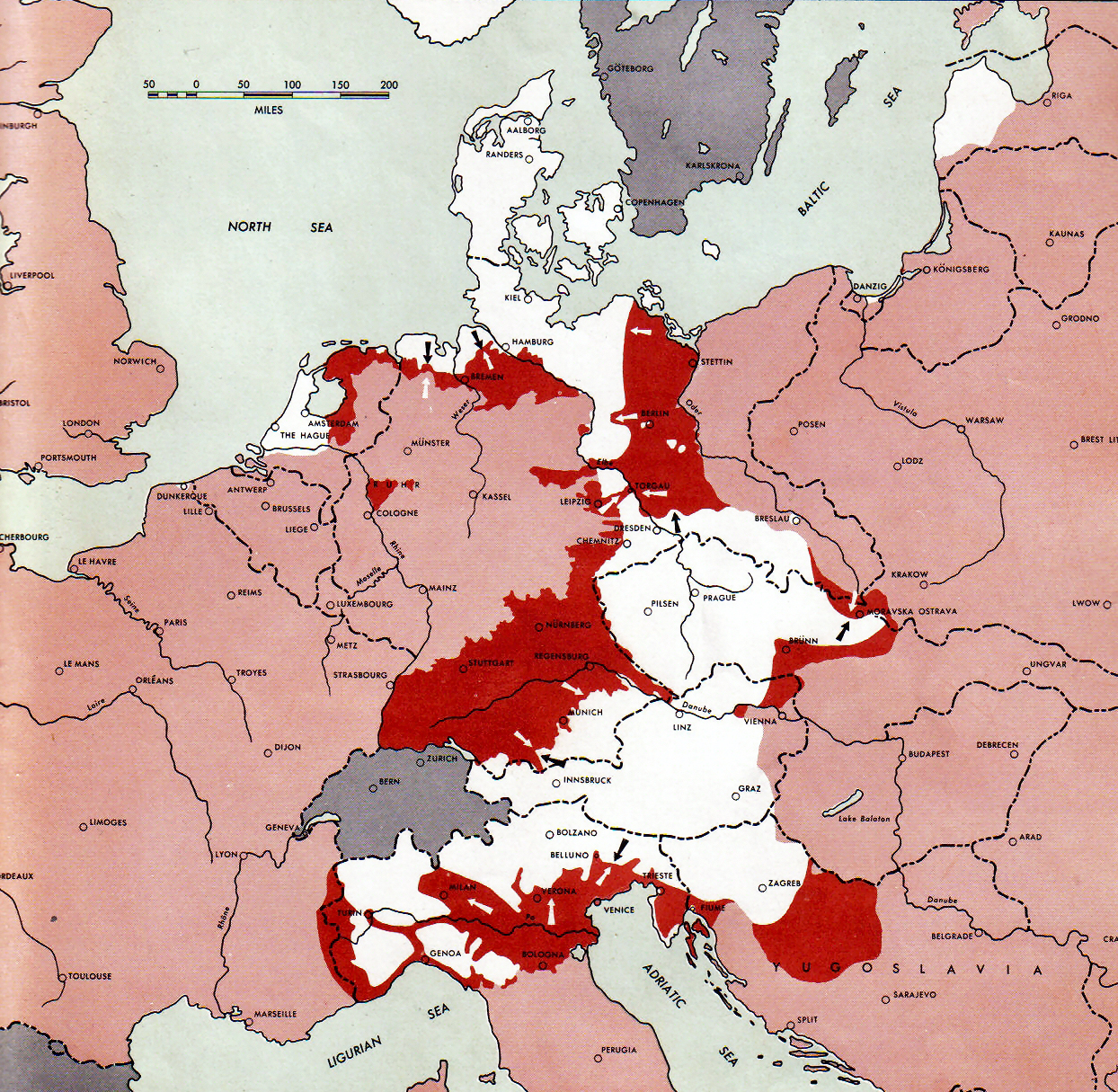
1st

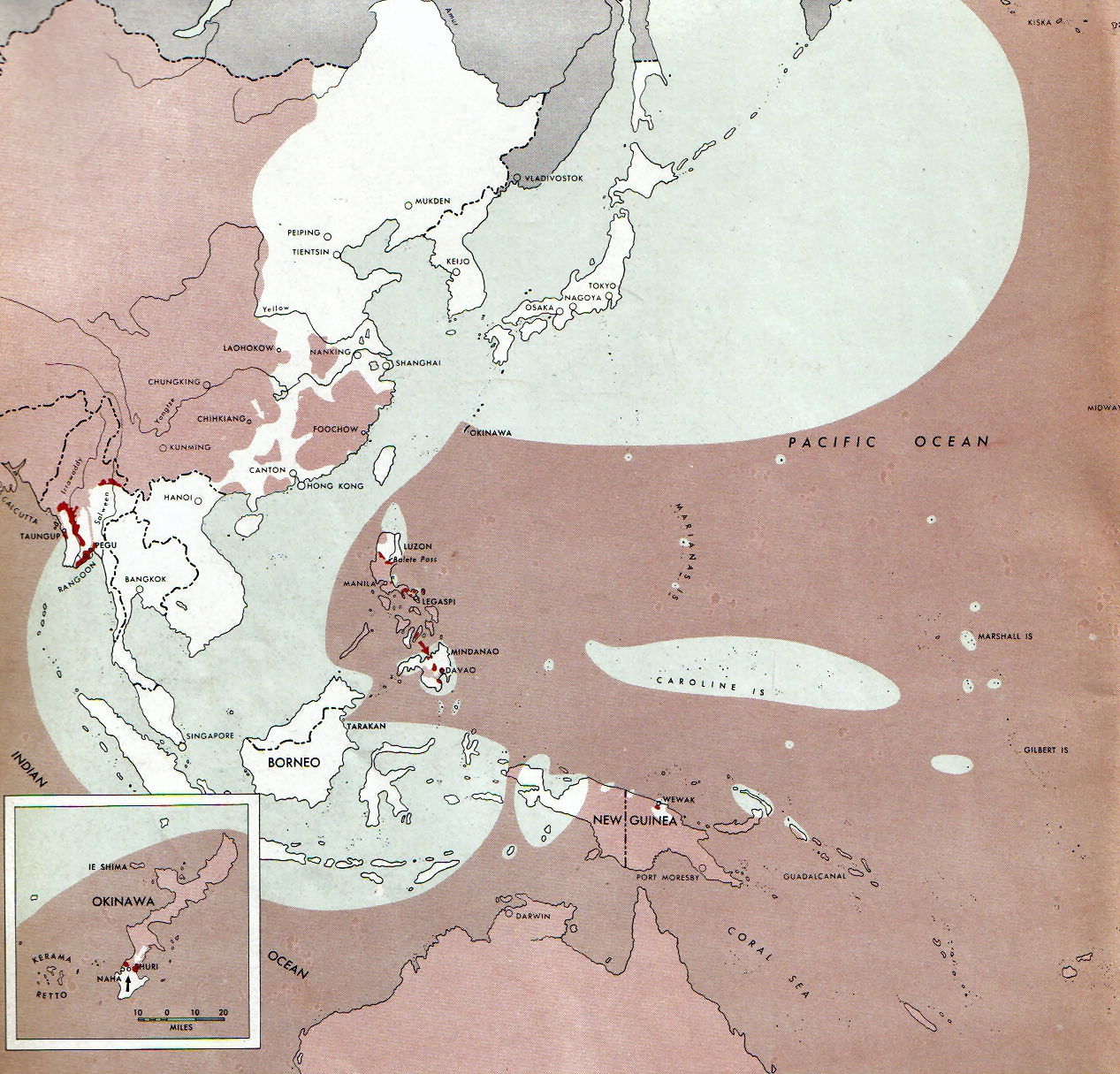
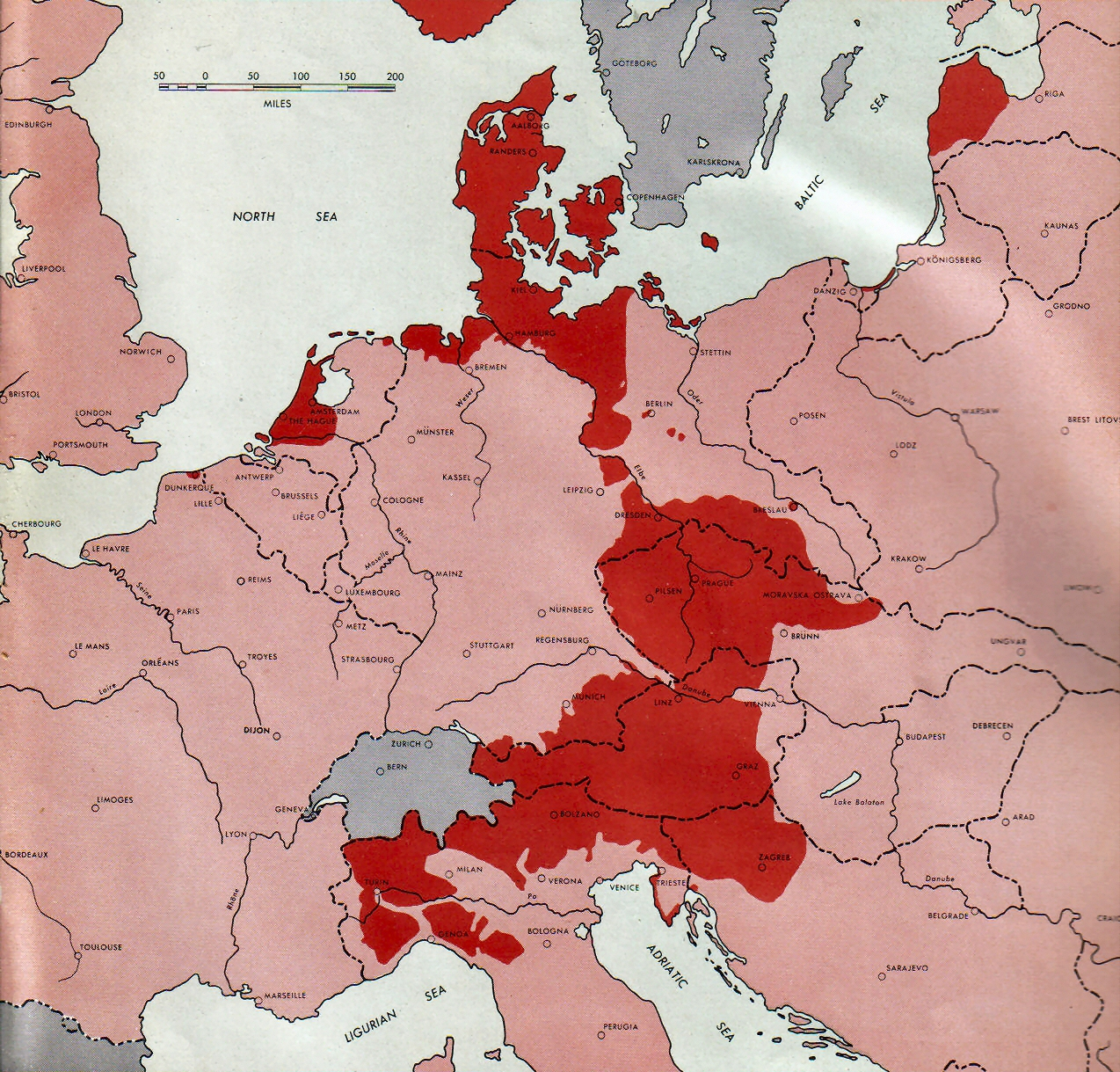
15th

1: German General Hans Krebs negotiates the surrender of the city of Berlin with Soviet General Vasily Chuikov. Chuikov, as commander of the Soviet 8th Guards Army, commands the Soviet forces in central Berlin. Krebs is not authorized by Reich Chancellor Goebbels to agree to an unconditional surrender, so his negotiations with Chuikov end with no agreement.
: Goebbels and his wife murder their children and commit suicide.
: Yugoslavian Partisan leader Josip Broz Tito and his troops capture Trieste, Italy.
: The war in Italy is over but some German troops are still not accounted for.
: Australian troops land on Tarakan island off the coast of Borneo

2: Soviet forces capture the Reichstag building and install the Soviet flag.
: The Battle of Berlin ends when German General Helmuth Weidling, commander of the Berlin Defence Area, (and no longer bound by Goebbels's commands), unconditionally surrenders the city of Berlin to Soviet General Vasily Chuikov.
: General Vietinghoff surrenders his troops in Northern Italy.
: Krebs, Martin Bormann and Wilhelm Burgdorf commit suicide.

3: Rangoon is liberated.
: The German cruiser Admiral Hipper is scuttled, having been hit heavily by the RAF in April.

4: Karl Dönitz orders all U-boats to cease operations.
: German troops in Denmark, Northern Germany and The Netherlands surrender to Montgomery.
: Neuengamme concentration camp is liberated.

5: Formal negotiations for Germany's surrender begin at Reims, France.
: Czech resistance fighters begin the Prague uprising and the Soviets begin the Prague Offensive.
: German troops in the Netherlands officially surrender; Prince Bernhard of the Netherlands accepts the surrender.
: Mauthausen concentration camp is liberated.
: Kamikazes have major successes off Okinawa.
: Japanese fire balloons claim their first and only lives—a Sunday school group in Bly, Oregon.

6: German soldiers open fire on a crowd celebrating the liberation of the Netherlands in Dam Square. At the brink of peace, 120 people were badly injured and 22 pronounced dead.
: This date marks the last fighting for American troops in Europe.

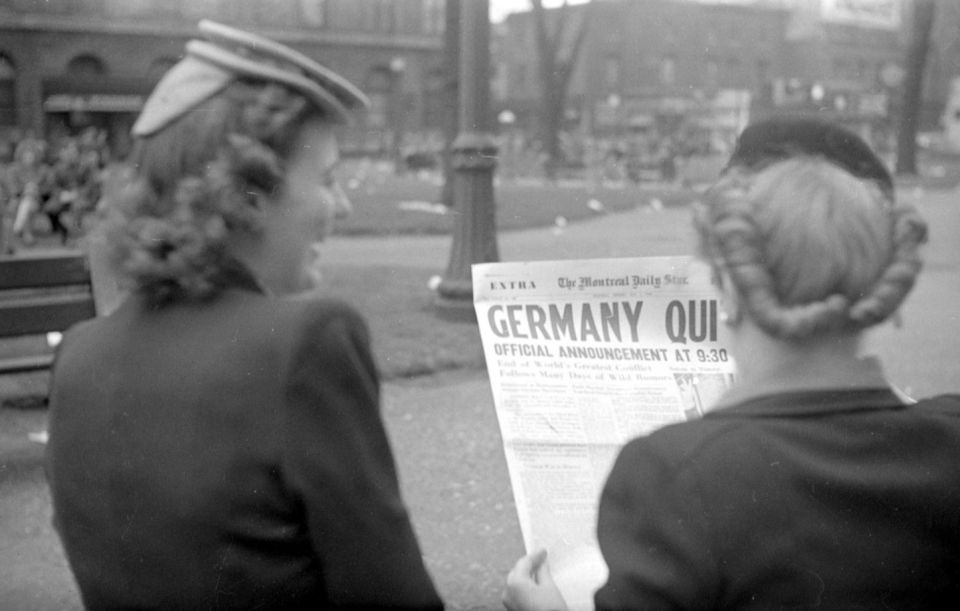
The front page of The Montreal Daily Star announcing the German surrender, May 7, 1945

7: Germany surrenders unconditionally to the Allies at the Western Allied Headquarters in Rheims, France at 2:41 a.m. In accordance with orders from Reich President Karl Dönitz, General Alfred Jodl signs for Germany.
: Hermann Göring, for a while in the hands of the SS, surrenders to the Americans. Elements of Task Force Smythe, U.S. 80th ID in Austria, fire last American shots of the war in Europe when 80th Recon Platoon is strafed by two German planes and returns fire, causing one plane to leave trailing smoke.

8: Victory in Europe Day: The ceasefire takes effect at one minute past midnight.
: In accordance with Dönitz's orders, Colonel-General Carl Hilpert unconditionally surrenders his troops in the Courland Pocket.
: Germany surrenders again unconditionally to the Soviet Union army but this time in a ceremony hosted by the Soviet Union. In accordance with orders from Dönitz, General Wilhelm Keitel signs for Germany.
: The remaining members of President Jozef Tiso's pro-German Slovak Republic capitulates to the American General Walton Walker's XX Corps in Kremsmünster, Austria.
: The Prague uprising ends with negotiated surrender with Czech resistance which allowed the Germans in Prague to leave the city.
: In order to disarm the Japanese in Vietnam, the Allies divide the country in half at the 16th parallel. Chinese Nationalists will move in and disarm the Japanese north of the parallel while the British will move in and do the same in the south. During the conference, representatives from France request the return of all French pre-war colonies in Indochina. Their request is granted.

9: The Soviet Union officially pronounces May 9 as Victory Day.
: The Red Army enters Prague.
: The German garrison in the Channel Islands agree to unconditional surrender.
: German troops on Bornholm surrender to Soviet troops.

11: The Soviets capture Prague, the last European capital to be liberated. Eisenhower stops Patton from participating in the liberation.
: German Army Group Centre in Czechoslovakia surrenders.
: War in New Guinea continues, with Australians attacking Wewak.

14: Nagoya, Japan, is heavily bombed.
: Fighting in the southern Philippines continues.

14–15: The Battle of Poljana begins and ends.

15-16: The Battle of the Malacca Strait took place ending in a British victory and the sinking of the Japanese cruiser Haguro.

20: The Georgian Uprising of Texel ends, concluding all World War II conflicts in the Netherlands.

21: SS Commander Heinrich Himmler, attempting to pass with a forged identity as a common soldier, is arrested at a checkpoint manned by liberated Soviet POWs acting under command of British forces. He would be remanded to British custody on 23 May and there correctly identified.

23: British forces capture and arrest the members of what was left of the Flensburg government. This was the German government formed by Reich President Karl Dönitz after the suicides of both Adolf Hitler and Joseph Goebbels.
: Heavy bombing of Yokohama, an important port and naval base.
: Heinrich Himmler, head of the notorious SS, dies of suicide via cyanide pill.

25: The Battle of Odžak ends, concluding all World War II conflicts in Yugoslavia and Europe.

29: Fighting breaks out in Syria and Lebanon, as nationalists demand freedom from French control.

== June 1945 ==
June 1945

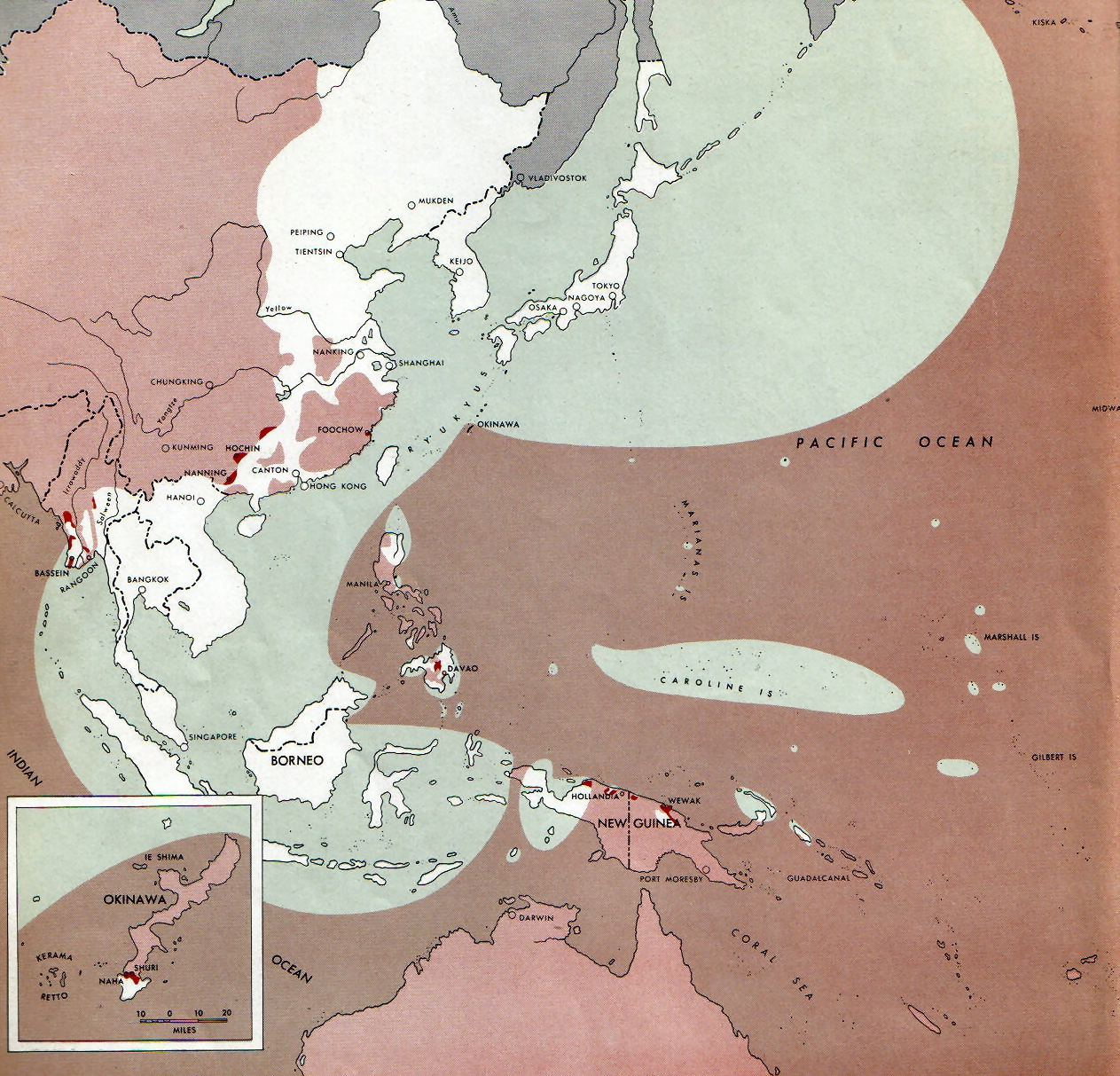
1st

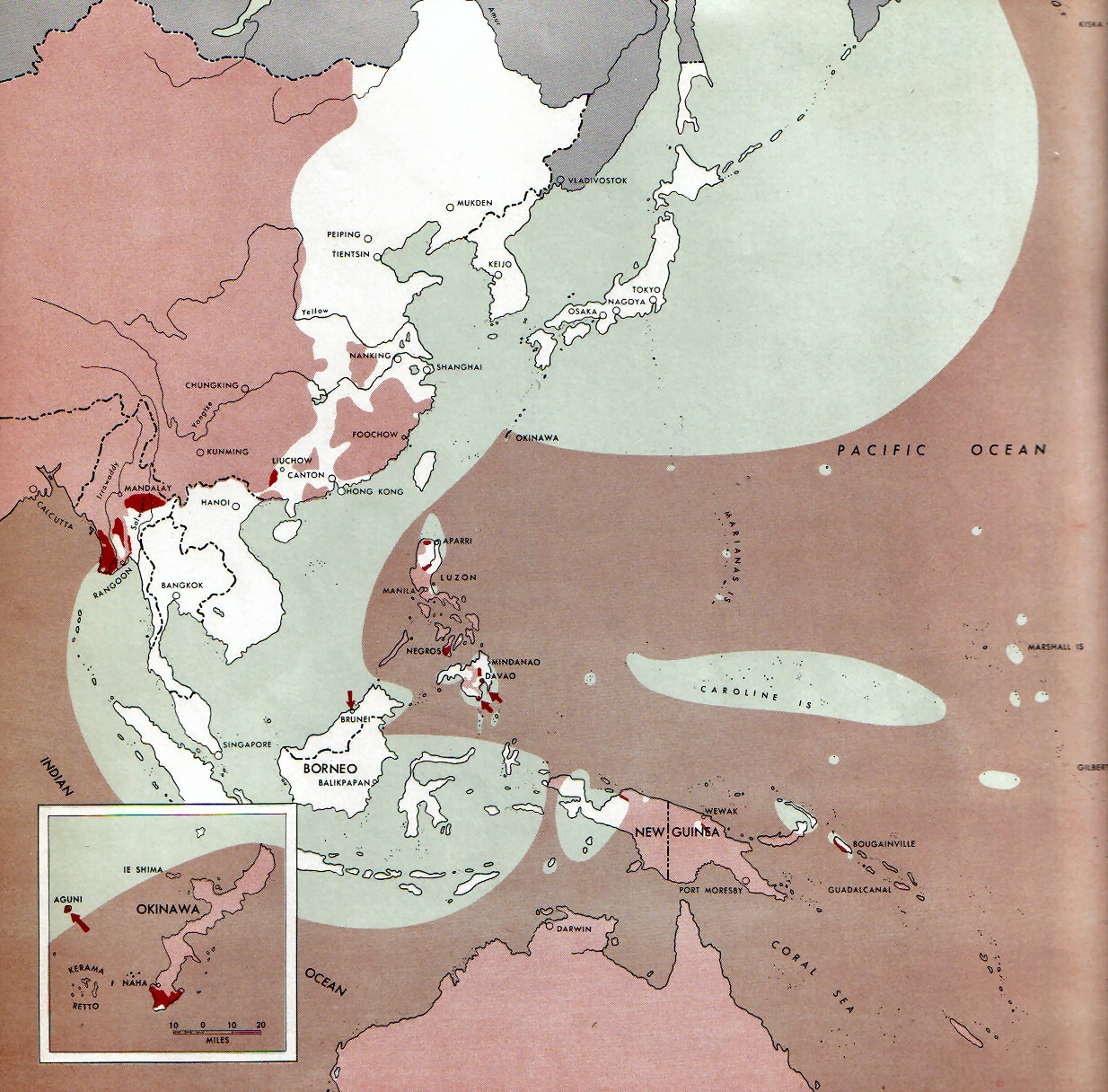
15th

2: Air Group 87 aircraft from USS Ticonderoga strike airfields on Kyushu, Japan, in an attempt to stop special attack aircraft from taking off.

5: The Allies agree to divide Germany into four areas of control (American, British, French and Soviet).
: The U.S. fleet under William Halsey, Jr., suffers widespread damage from a huge Pacific typhoon.

10: Australian troops land in Brunei.

11: Schiermonnikoog, a Dutch island, is the last part of Europe freed by Allied troops.

13: The Australians capture Brunei.
: Japanese Admiral Ota Minoru, along with thousands of his surrounded Naval brigade, commits ritual suicide for failing to defend Okinawa, Japan.

15: Osaka, Japan, is heavily bombed.

16: The Japanese are in a general retreat in central China.

19: The United Kingdom begins demobilization.

22: The defeat of the Japanese on Okinawa is now complete.

26: The United Nations Charter is signed in San Francisco.

27: The first oil pump is restored at Tarakan Island.

== July 1945 ==
July 1945

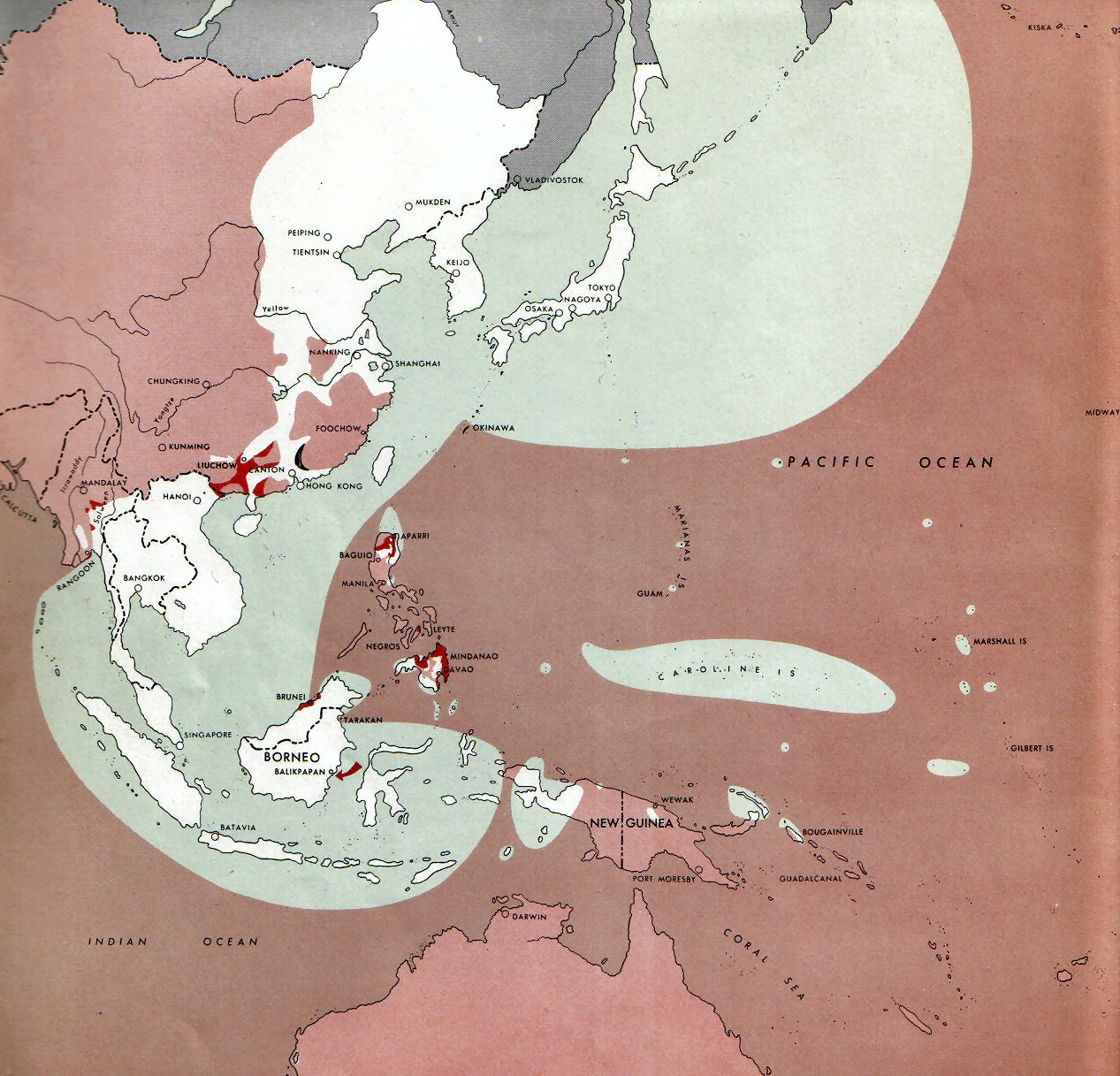
1st

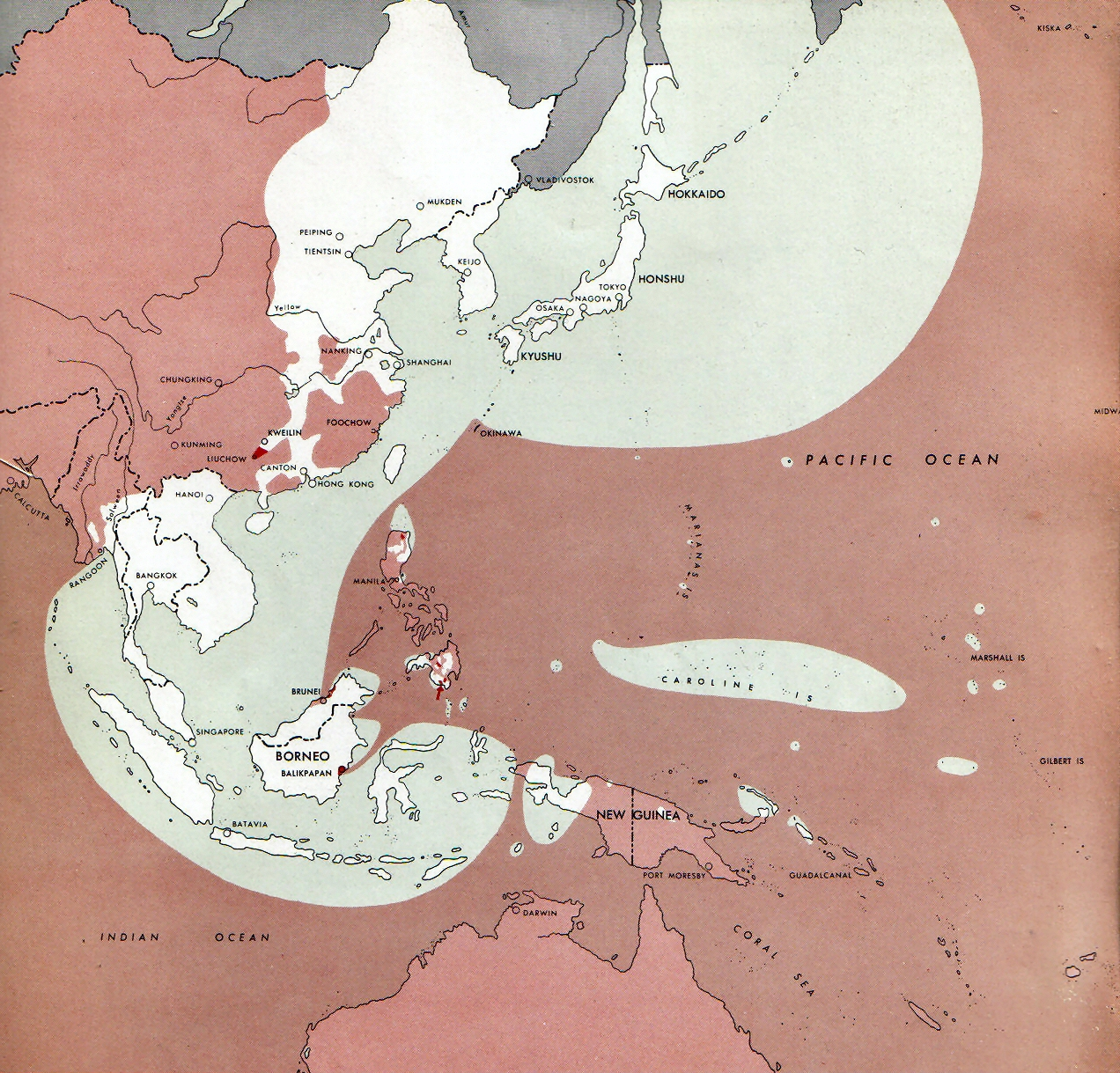
15th

1: Australian troops land at Balikpapan, Borneo in the Western Allies' last major land operation of the war.

5: General Douglas MacArthur announces that the Philippines have been liberated.

6: Norway declares war on Japan.

10: US Navy Fast Carrier Task Force 38 aircraft participate in attacks on Tokyo for the first time.

14: Italy declares war on Japan.

16: The U.S. conducts the Trinity test at Alamogordo, New Mexico, the first test of a nuclear weapon.

17: The Potsdam Conference begins under British Prime Minister Churchill, Soviet Prime Minister Stalin and U.S. President Truman. The Allied leaders agree to insist upon the unconditional surrender of Japan.

22: America and Japan engage in a small skirmish in the Battle of Tokyo Bay. The Japanese take slight losses

Clement Attlee, Harry S. Truman and Joseph Stalin at the 1945 Potsdam Conference.

24: Truman hints at the Potsdam Conference that the United States has nuclear weapons.
: British and Americans commence the Bombing of Kure.

26: The Labour Party win the British general election by a landslide. Clement Attlee replaces Churchill as British Prime Minister and immediately flies to the negotiating table at Potsdam. The Potsdam Declaration is issued.

28: The Japanese battleships Haruna and Ise are sunk by aircraft from US Task Force 38 while in shallow anchorage at Kure Naval Base.

30: The USS Indianapolis is sunk shortly after midnight by a Japanese submarine after having delivered atomic bomb material to Tinian. Because of poor communications, the ship's whereabouts are unknown for some time and many of its men drown or are attacked by sharks in the next four days.

31: U.S. conducts air attacks on the cities of Kobe and Nagoya in Japan.

== August 1945 ==
August 1945

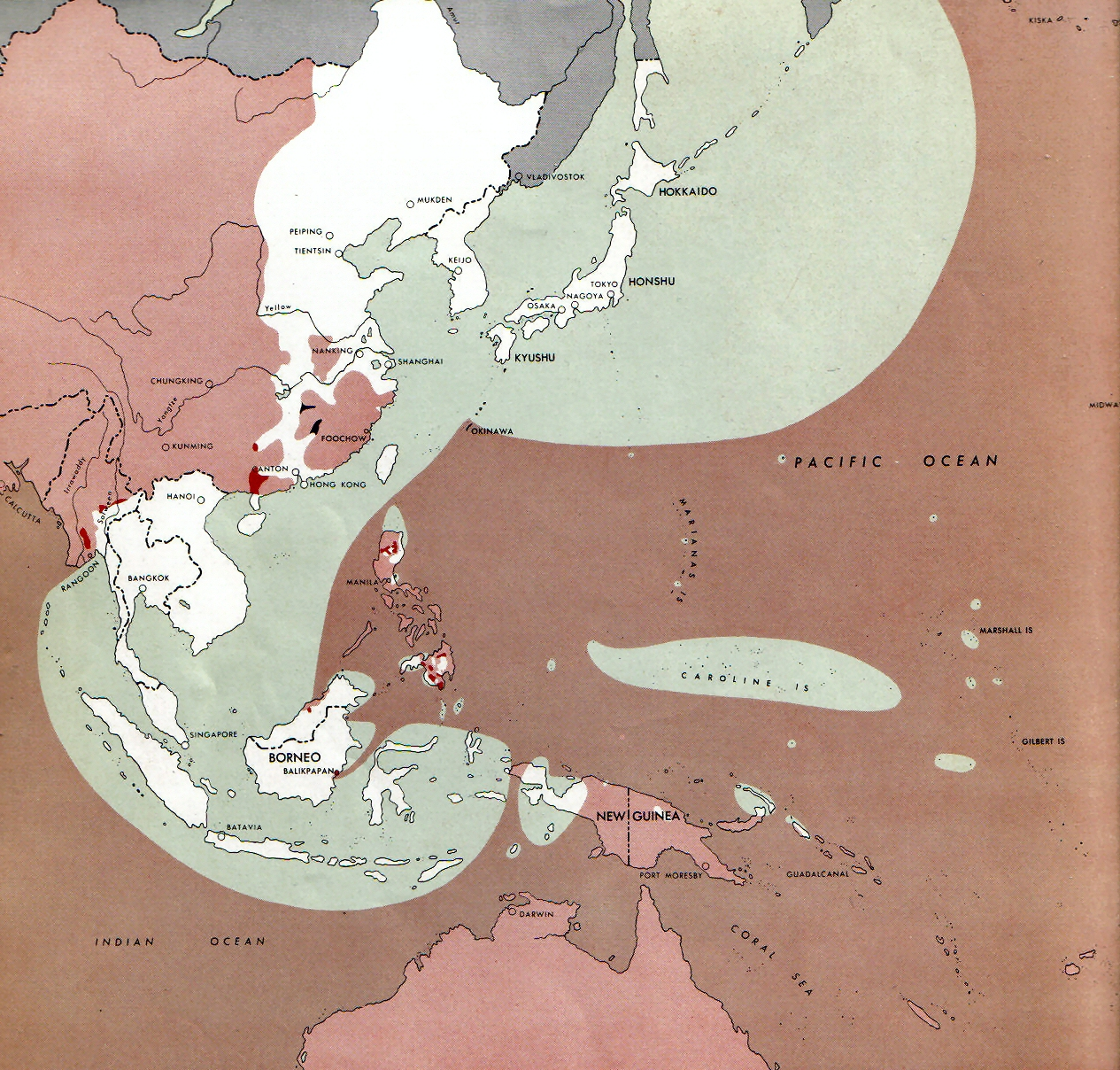
1st

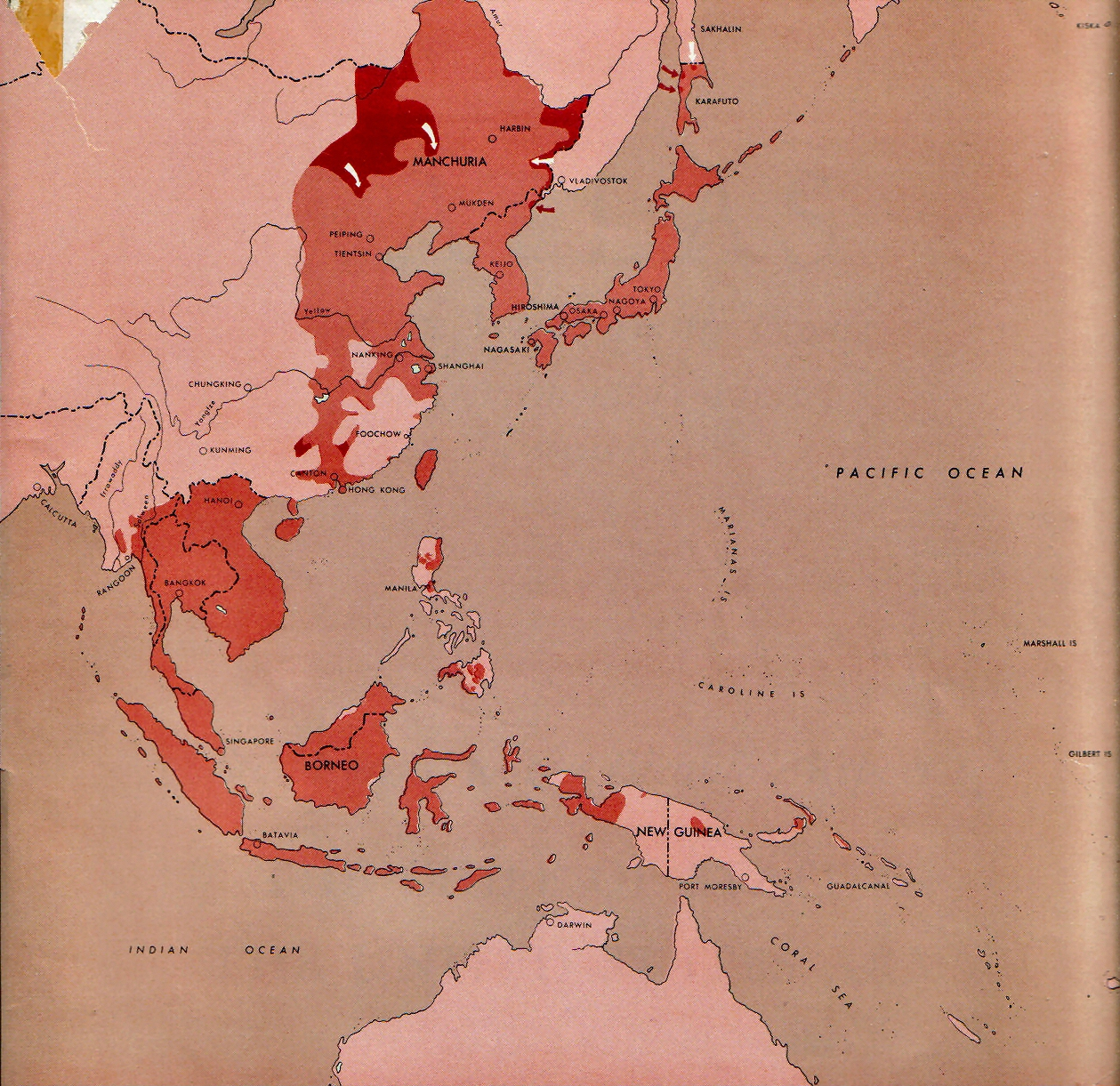
15th

1: Ukrainian insurgents attack the police station in Baligrod, Poland. Polish soldiers defend the station, driving off the attackers, who torch several houses as they retreat.

2: End of the Potsdam Conference: Issues such as the expulsion of Germans from the eastern quarter of Germany and elsewhere in eastern Europe are mandated in the Potsdam Agreement.

6: The B-29 bomber Enola Gay drops the first atomic bomb "Little Boy" on Hiroshima.

8: The Soviet Union declares war on Japan; the Soviet invasion of Manchuria begins about an hour later which includes landings on the Kuril Islands. The Japanese have been evacuating in anticipation of this.

9: The B-29 bomber Bockscar drops the second atomic bomb "Fat Man" on Nagasaki.

10: The Japanese government announced that a message had been sent to the Allies accepting the terms of the Potsdam Declaration provided that it "does not comprise any demand that prejudices the prerogatives of the Emperor as sovereign ruler."

14: Japanese military personnel and right-wingers attempt to overthrow their government and prevent the inevitable surrender.
: The last day of United States Force combat actions. All units are frozen in place.

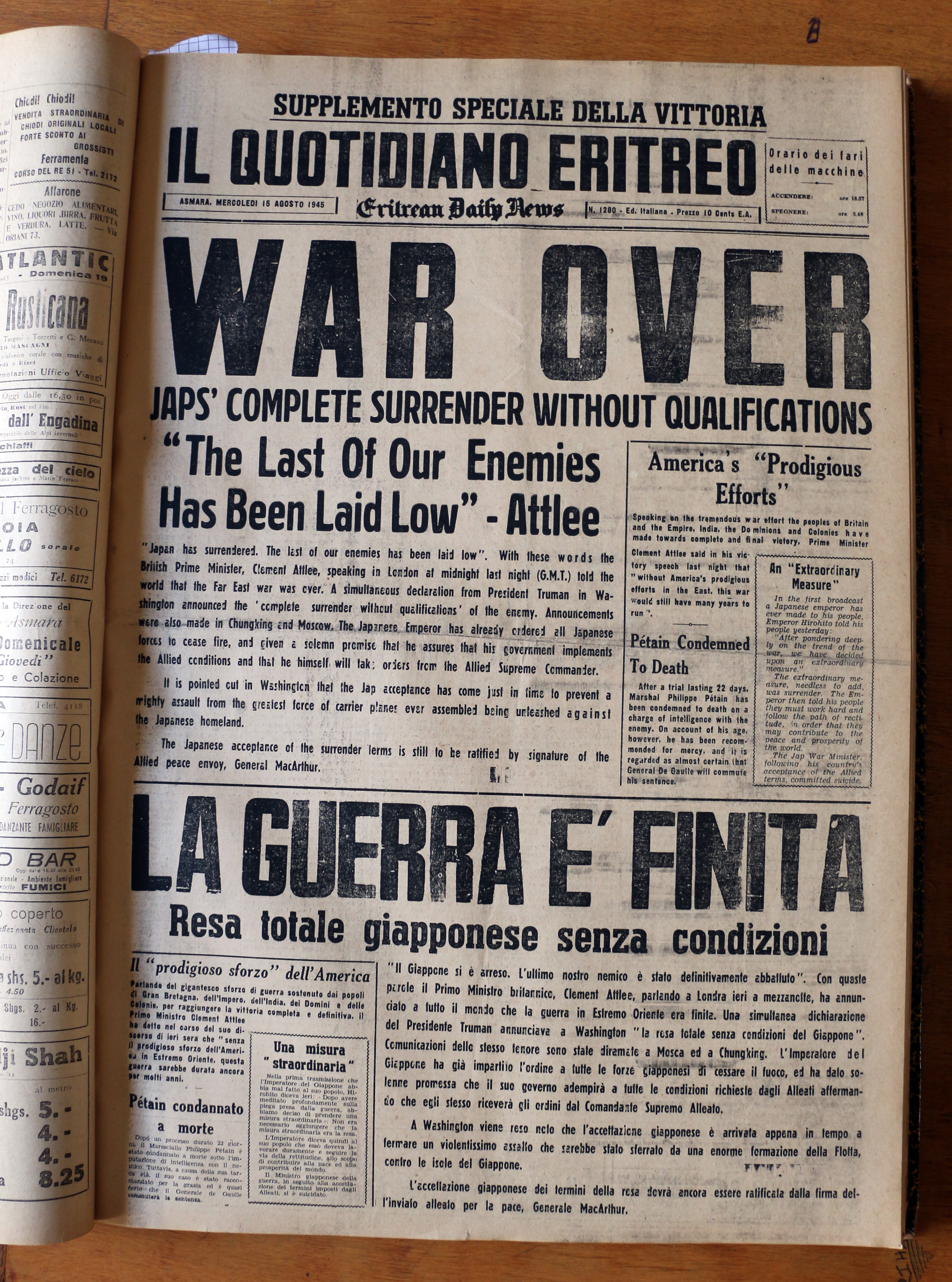
Eritrean newspaper of August 15, 1945 titles: "War is over"

15: Emperor Hirohito issues a radio broadcast announcing the Surrender of Japan; though the surrender seems to be "unconditional", the Emperor's status is still open for discussion.
: Victory over Japan Day celebrations take place worldwide.

16: Emperor Hirohito issues an Imperial Rescript ordering Japanese forces to cease fire.

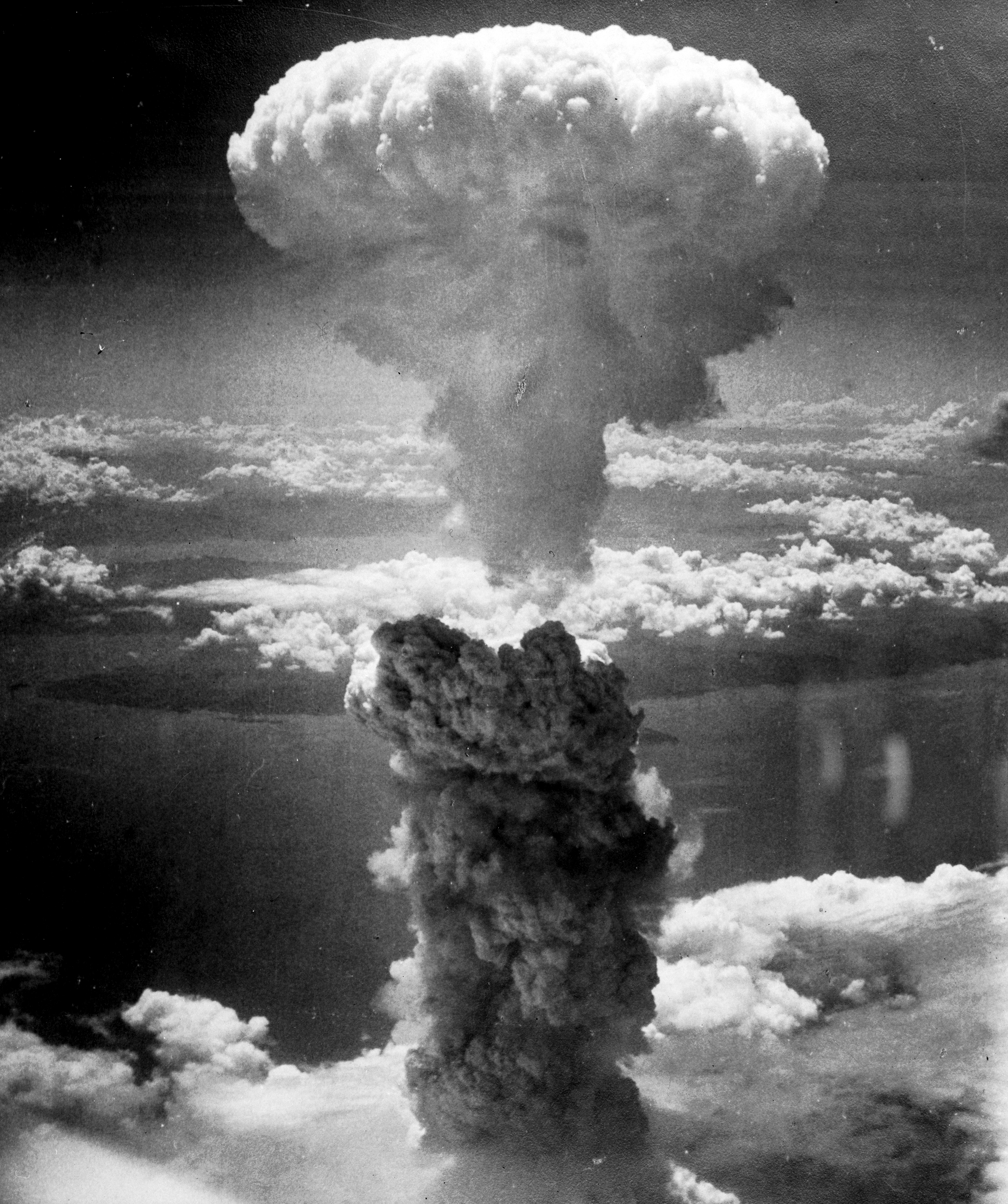
The Fat Man mushroom cloud resulting from the nuclear explosion over Nagasaki rises 18 km (60,000 ft) into the air from the hypocentre.

17: Indonesia declares independence from Japan and beginning a national revolution.
: General Order No. 1 for the surrender of Japan is approved by President Truman.

19: At a spontaneous non-communist meeting in Hanoi, Ho Chi Minh and the Viet Minh assume a leading role in the movement to wrest power from the French. With the Japanese still in control of Indochina in the interim, Bảo Đại goes along because he thinks that the Viet Minh are still working with the American OSS and could guarantee independence for Vietnam. Later, Ho Chi Minh's guerrillas occupy Hanoi and proclaim a provisional government.
: Hostilities between Chinese Nationalists and Chinese Communists break into the open.

20: Nazi collaborator Vidkun Quisling went on trial in Oslo, Norway.

22: Japanese armies surrender to the Red Army in Manchuria.

27: Japanese armies in Burma surrender at Rangoon ceremonies.

30: Royal Navy force under Rear-Admiral Cecil Harcourt liberates Hong Kong.

31: General MacArthur takes over command of the Japanese government in Tokyo.

== September 1945 ==
2: The Japanese Instrument of Surrender is signed on the deck of the USS Missouri in Tokyo Bay.
: The commander of the Imperial Japanese Army, General Tomoyuki Yamashita surrenders to Filipino and American troops at Kiangan, Ifugao in Northern Philippines.
: Ho Chi Minh issues his Proclamation of Independence, drawing heavily upon the American Declaration of Independence from a copy provided by the Office of Strategic Services. Ho declares himself president of the Democratic Republic of Vietnam and pursues American recognition but is repeatedly ignored by President Truman.

== See also ==
- Strategic operations of the U.S. Army in World War II
- Strategic operations of the Soviet Red Army in World War II

== Bibliography ==
- Stanley, Peter (1997). Tarakan. An Australian Tragedy. Sydney: Allen & Unwin. ISBN 1-86448-278-8.
