= Warsaw Praga-Północ County =

County within Warsaw City (1944–1960)

- County of Warsaw
- 1944–1960
- Capital: Warsaw
- Area
  - 1947: 19.93 km^{2} (7.70 sq mi)
- Population
  - 1946: 96 116
  - Type: County
- History
  - Established: 1944
  - Disestablished: 1960
- Contained within
  - Country: Provisional Government of the Republic of Poland (1944–1945); Provisional Government of National Unity (1945–1947); Polish People's Republic (1947–1960)
  - Voivodeship: Warsaw
Preceded by	Succeeded by
Warsaw County	Warsaw

The Warsaw Praga-Północ County (Note: Polish: Powiat północnoprasko-warszawski) was a county within the city of Warsaw. It existed from 1944 to 1960, as a county of Warsaw, an independent city, that functioned as a voivodeship. From 1944 to 1945, it was under the administration of the Provisional Government of the Republic of Poland, from 1945 to 1947, under the Provisional Government of National Unity, and from 1947 to 1960, under the Polish People's Republic.

== History ==
It was established in 1944, from the part of the Warsaw County, as one of the counties of Warsaw, an independent city, that functioned as a voivodeship. From 1944 to 1945, it was within the territory under the administration of the Provisional Government of the Republic of Poland, which then was replaced by the Provisional Government of National Unity. In 1947, the government had been replaced by the Polish People's Republic.

In 1946 it had 96 116 inhabitants, and in 1947 it had an area of 19.93 km^{2}.

The county existed until 1960, when the counties were replaced by the city districts.
