= Provisional Government of the Republic of Poland =

Government of Poland from 1944 to 1945

Republic of Poland Rzeczpospolita Polska
- 1944–1945
- Flag Coat of arms
- Anthem: "Mazurek Dąbrowskiego" (English: "Poland Is Not Yet Lost")
- Capital: Warsaw (de jure); Lublin (de facto)
- Common languages: Polish
- Religion: Catholic Church
- Demonym: Pole, Polish
- Government: Provisional government
- President of KRN
  - 1944–1945: Bolesław Bierut
- Prime Minister
  - 1944–1945: E. Osóbka-Morawski
- Historical era: World War II
  - PKWN formed: 22 July 1944
  - PKWN renamed into Provisional Government (RTRP): 31 December 1944
  - Reshuffle into TRJN: 28 June 1945
- Currency: Polish złoty
Preceded by
Polish Committee of National Liberation
Council of Ministers at Home
Polish areas annexed by Nazi Germany
General Government
Bialystok District
Białystok and Przemyśl areas annexed by Soviet Union in 1939
Succeeded by
Provisional Government of National Unity
- Today part of: Poland; Czech Republic; Slovakia; Ukraine; Belarus; Lithuania

The Provisional Government of the Republic of Poland (Polish: Rząd Tymczasowy Rzeczypospolitej Polskiej, RTRP) was created by the State National Council (Krajowa Rada Narodowa) on the night of 31 December 1944.

== Background ==
The Provisional Government of the Republic of Poland was created to take the place of the previous governmental body, the Polish Committee of National Liberation (Polski Komitet Wyzwolenia Narodowego or PKWN). Because of its location in Lublin, the PKWN was also known as the "Lublin Committee". The establishment of the RTRP was an important step in strengthening the control of the Polish Workers' Party and the Soviet Union in Poland.

== History ==
=== Creation ===
On 1 January 1945, the Polish Committee of National Liberation became the Provisional Government of Republic of Poland. In London, the Polish government-in-exile protested. They issued a declaration that the Soviet Union had "taken over the sovereign political rights of the Polish nation." The governments of Winston Churchill and Franklin D. Roosevelt also issued formal protest, but they took no further action.

The Provisional Government of the Republic of Poland did not recognize the Polish government-in-exile and proclaimed itself to be the legitimate government of Poland. Initially, the RTRP was only officially recognized by the Soviet Union. But before the Yalta Conference, Joseph Stalin conveyed his intention to the Western Allies that Poland was under the control of the Soviet Union and that he intended for it to stay that way. The RTRP was given control of the Polish territories seized by the Red Army as it advanced westward.

The RTRP was chaired by the previous Prime Minister of PKWN, Edward Osóbka-Morawski. The Deputy Prime Ministers of the RTRP were Władysław Gomułka of the Polish Workers' Party (PPR, for Polska Partia Robotnicza) and Stanisław Janusz from People's Party. The Minister of Defense was Michał Rola-Żymierski. The Minister of Security was Stanisław Radkiewicz.

The Polish Workers' Party declared that the RTRP was to be a coalition, but in practice all key posts were controlled by PPR. Semi-official control of the RTRP was exercised by Soviet General Ivan Serov. Some Polish Communists, like Władysław Gomułka and Edward Ochab, were opposed to this excessive Soviet control. However, they could do little to change the existing status quo.

On 18 January, the RTRP was relocated from Lublin to Warsaw.

From 30 January to 2 February, the heads of government of the Soviet Union, the United Kingdom, and the United States— Joseph Stalin, Winston Churchill, Franklin D. Roosevelt, respectively — attended preliminary discussions on the Yalta Conference.

From 4 February to 12 February, the heads of government of the United States, the United Kingdom, and the Soviet Union attended the Yalta Conference in the Crimea. At Yalta, the following "Joint Allied Declaration on Poland" was developed:

The three heads of governments consider that the Eastern frontier of Poland should follow the Curzon line, with digressions from it in some regions of five to eight kilometers in favor of Poland. They recognize that Poland must receive substantial of accessions of territory in the north and west. They feel that the opinion of the new Polish Provisional Government of National Unity should be sought in due course on the extent of these accessions, and that the final delimitation of the Western frontier of Poland should thereafter await the Peace Conference.

On 7 February, Churchill documented the following discussion while at Yalta:

How soon," asked the President, "will it be possible to hold elections?"

"Within a month," Stalin replied, "unless there is some catastrophe at the front, which is improbable."

"I said that this would of course set our minds at rest, and we could wholeheartedly support a freely elected Government which would supersede everything else, but we must not ask for anything which would in any way hamper the military operations."

On 23 April, Soviet diplomat Vyacheslav Molotov was in Washington, DC. President Harry S. Truman and the United States Department of State appealed to Molotov for a compromise on the "Polish question". On the same day, Prime Minister Edward Osóbka-Morawski of the RTRP announced the following at a press conference:

We need people who agree with our foreign policy and with our social reforms. Only such a government can do its work properly. We need the collaboration of men who accept the Yalta decisions, not only formally, but in fact. We are making every effort to contact such people. What we do not want are Fascists . . .

=== Provisional Government of National Unity replaces the RTRP ===
On 28 June 1945, the Provisional Government of Republic of Poland (Rząd Tymczasowy Rzeczypospolitej Polskiej) was transformed into the more coalition-like Provisional Government of National Unity (Tymczasowy Rząd Jedności Narodowej). This was promised by Stalin at Yalta and done by him as gesture of good will towards the Western Allies and Polish government-in-exile in London.

== See also ==
- Polish Committee of National Liberation (Polish: Polski Komitet Wyzwolenia Narodowego; PKWN) - 1944 and 1945
- Provisional Government of National Unity (Polish: Tymczasowy Rząd Jedności Narodowej; TRJN)- 1945 to 1947
- People's Army of Poland (Polish: Ludowe Wojsko Polskie; LWP)
- Polish government-in-exile
