= Central Department Store (Warsaw) =

1952 Modernist building in Warsaw, Poland

Coordinates: 52°13′53″N 21°01′01″E

Cedet Central Department Store
- Centralny Dom Towarowy (Polish)
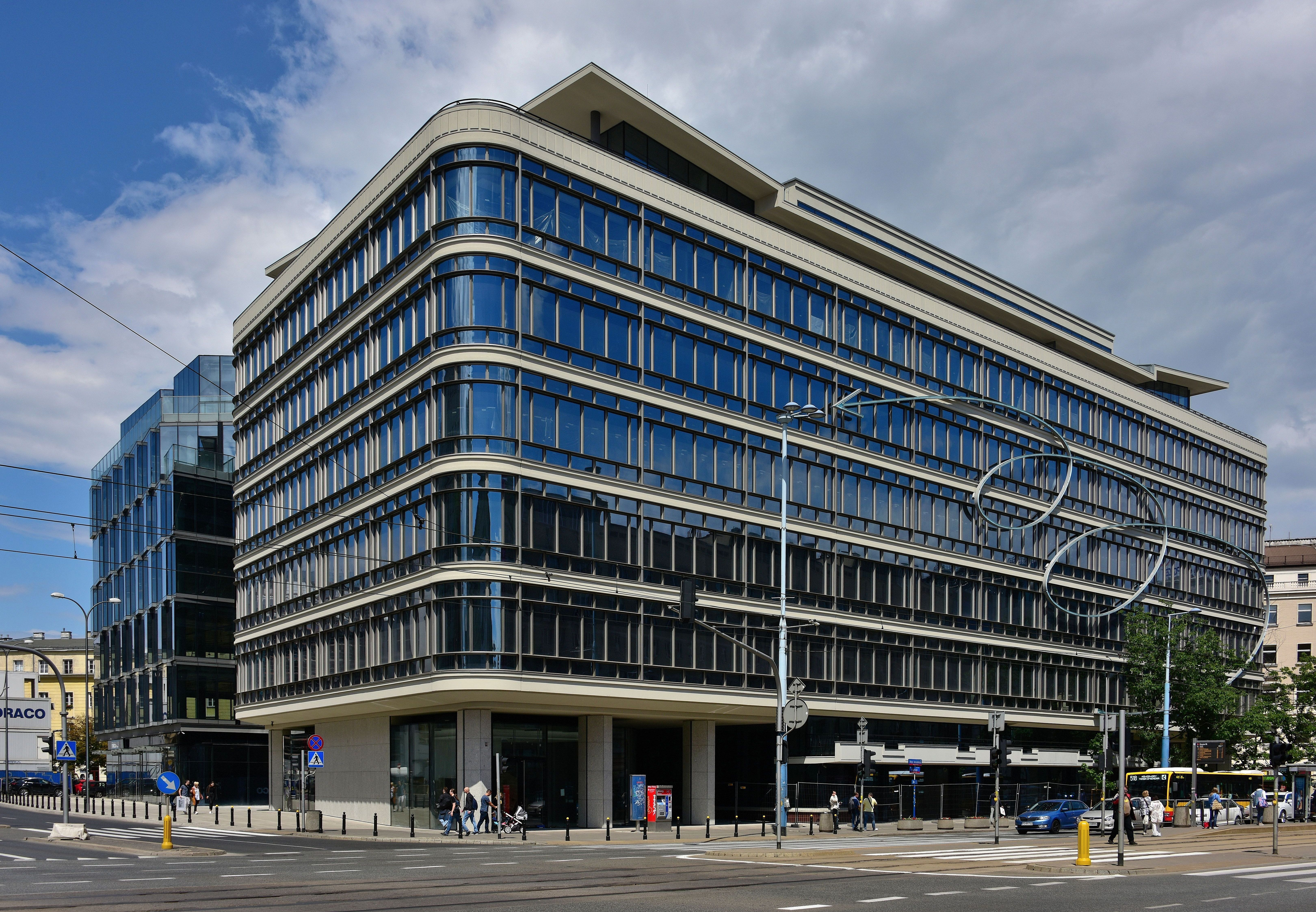
- Cedet in 2018
- Interactive map of the Cedet; Central Department Store area
- Former names: Central Children's Home; "Smyk" Department Store

General information
- Type: Department store; children's toy store; office building
- Architectural style: Modernism
- Location: 50 Krucza Street, Warsaw, Poland
- Construction started: 1948
- Completed: 1952

Design and construction
- Architects: Zbigniew Ihnatowicz, Jerzy Romański

Other information
- Public transit access: Krucza stop: lines 7, 9, 22, 24, 25

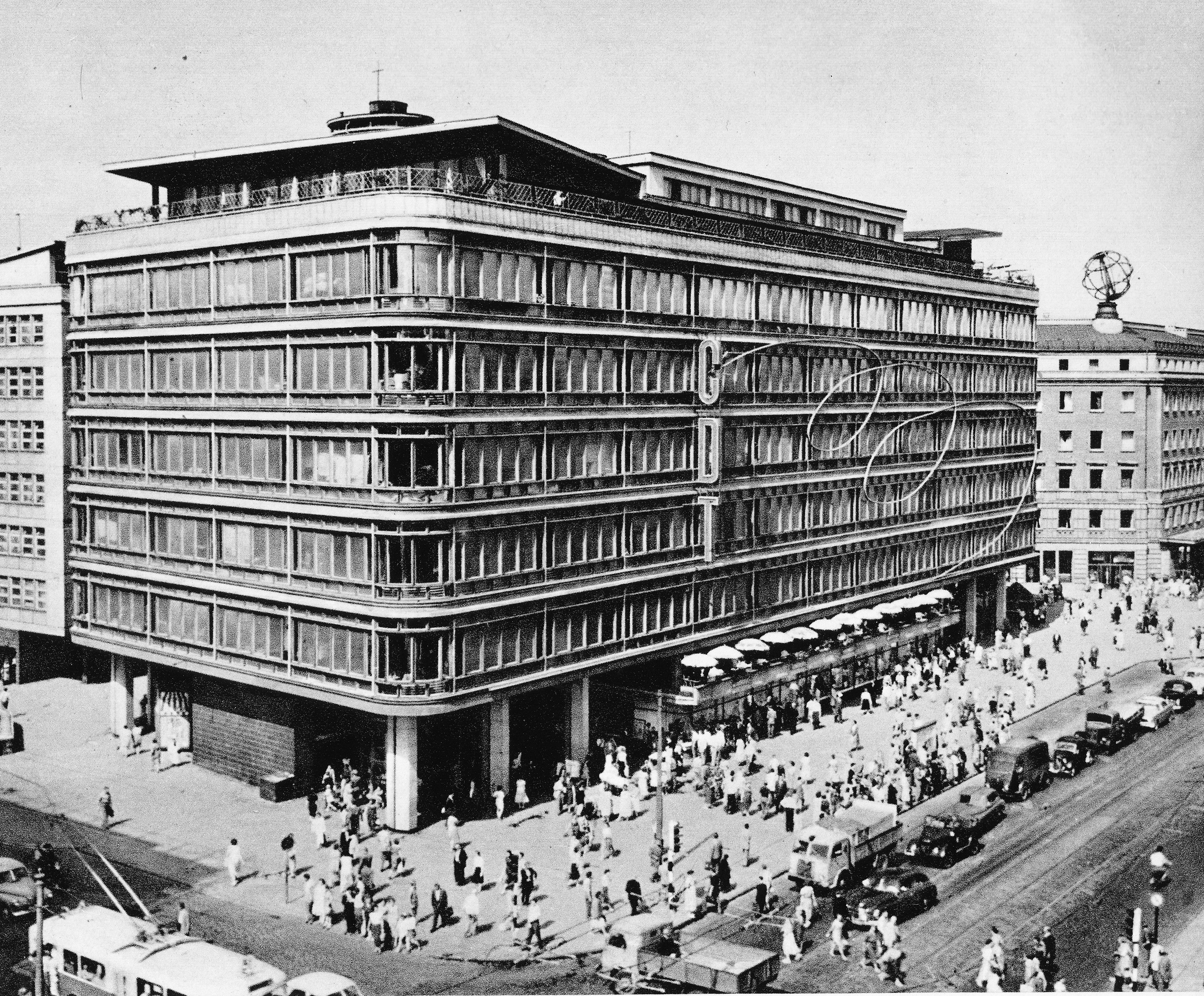
Central Department Store in 1960s.

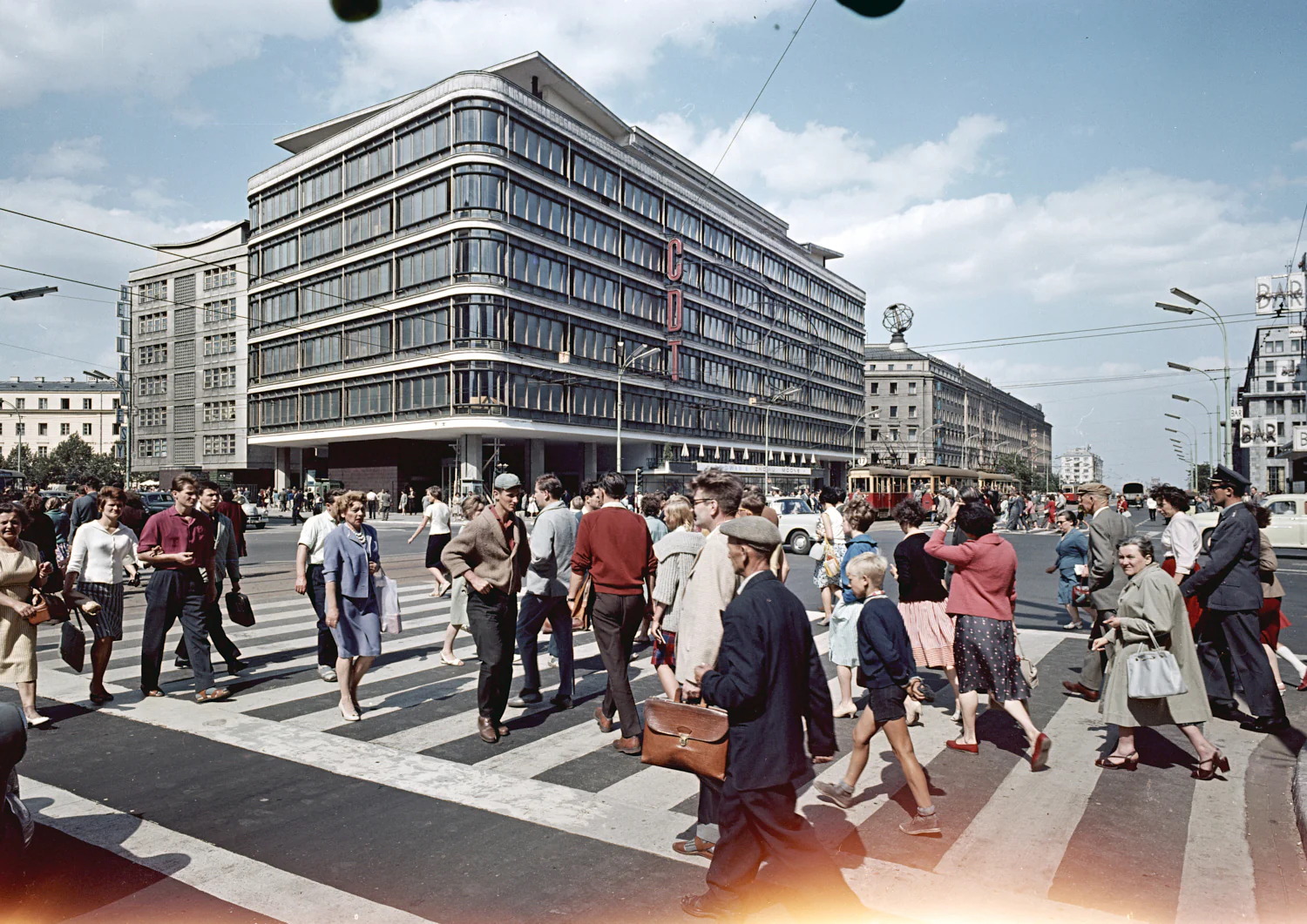
Central Department Store in 1962.

The Cedet, originally known as the Central Department Store (Polish: Centralny Dom Towarowy, CDT), (Note: From 1971 Central Children's Home (Centralny Dom Dziecka). From 1977 "Smyk" Department Store (Dom Towarowy "Smyk"). Commonly referred to as Cedet (from pronunciation of CDT acronym) since construction. In 2018 officially named Cedet by new owner.) is a modernist building in Warsaw, Poland. Initially built as a department store, it now serves as an office building. It was designed by architects Zbigniew Ihnatowicz and Jerzy Romański, and constructed between 1948 and 1952.

Distinct from the socialist realist architecture promoted at the time—and officially adopted as aesthetic doctrine in 1949 under communist rule in Poland—the CDT building sparked controversy upon its completion.

Between 2014 and 2018, it underwent a major reconstruction by a private investor who had purchased the building in 2013. The redevelopment received unfavorable reviews from the architectural community but was widely appreciated by the general public.

== Architecture ==
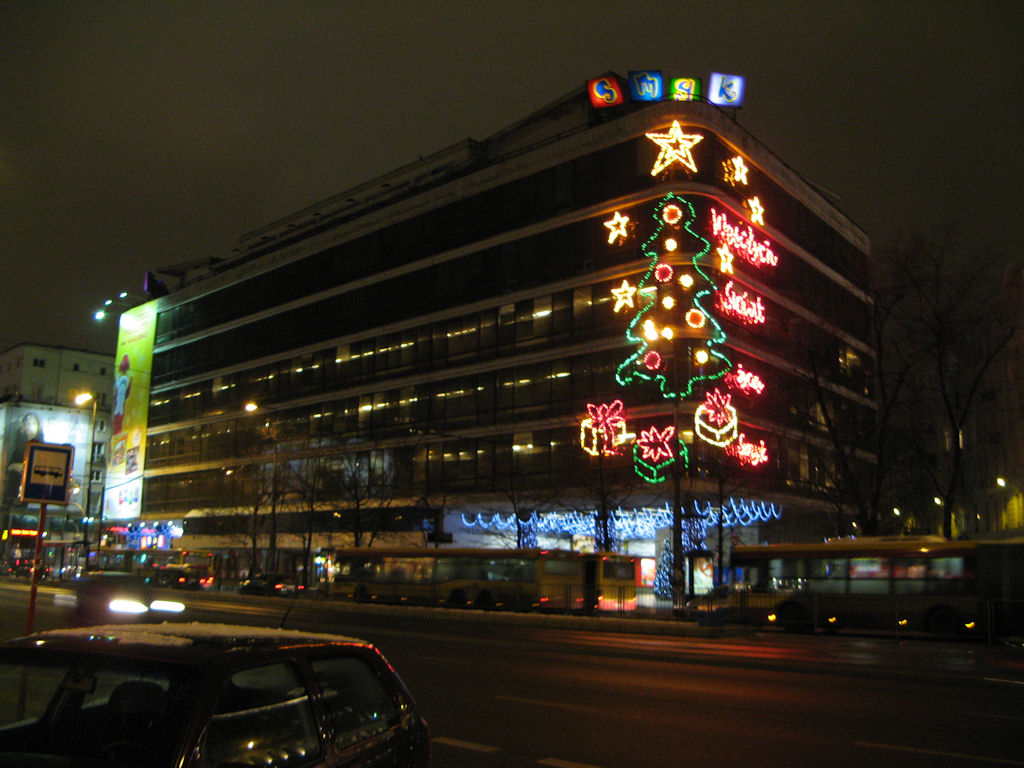
The CDT 'Smyk' building on Aleje Jerozolimskie

The building was designed in the popular pre-war 1920s style of modernism. Built as a detached structure formed from three separate blocks, the first and main block forms the core of the store itself, with the main façade of the building fronting Aleje Jerozolimskie, the second construction operates as a food hall, whilst the third became a small office building attached to the rear of the main store via the restaurant section on the ground floor. The main store was previously famous for its high-modernist windows, which were constructed using Polish oak frames and glass panes with an anti-reflective coating - a first for post-war era Polish architecture. The south elevation's main façade was specially designed to carry advertising and for most of its history was adorned with the store's trademark neon lights, arranged in the shape of spirals and supplemented with the vertically stacked letters "CDT", which stood for the store's original name Centralny Dom Towarowy (Central Department Store).

Inside the building, communication between floors was ensured with the construction of 6 main escalators and 4 elevators within a central stairwell, these were further supplemented by a multitude of other minor escalators and stairways; this made CDT the second building in Warsaw to use moving-stairway technology. The building has two major emergency exits which lead directly down to Bracka and Krucza streets.

The lobby of the store was originally decorated with terracotta wall tiling and oak flooring whilst the basement floor utilised reinforced concrete with glass and steel fittings; the use of these materials was then expanded to outfit the whole store. In addition to the standard fittings, a number of special pieces of art were commissioned for the interiors of the store, these included both sculpture and paintings, although they were usually of a distinctly modernist or post-modernist style.

== Major fire of 1975 ==
On Sunday, 21 September 1975, starting at sometime between 7 and 8 pm the Central Department Store caught fire. The fire initially struck the 6th floor, feeding on rich wall coverings, carpets and fabrics there. During the fire, pieces of the ceiling began to fall, and largely as a result of this, as well as the large number of escalators, the fire spread to another three floors of the building. Around 8.30 pm there was a large explosion which left a large amount of glass and other debris strewn across Krucza street and the Aleje Jerozolimskie. Around 10 pm the entire building had been thoroughly burnt and as the fire began to reach the plastic consumer goods, the flames provided a spectacular sight by turning light blue, purple and pink.

The Warsaw fire service finally managed to bring the fire under control and subsequently extinguished it shortly after midnight; and whilst the majority of the store was completely destroyed, the main concrete construction of the CDT fortunately survived. The cause of the fire was later assumed to have been by a faulty escalator motor which had malfunctioned, and then burnt out.

Afterwards, the state authorities decided to renovate the CDT. However, with the fire having completely destroyed the original interior and all its furnishings, the government believed that it would be too costly to replace everything in the hard economic times of the 1970s and so instead embarked upon a complete reconstruction of the building which changed much of its original appearance and never allowed it to regain its former glory. During the reconstruction most of the distinctive furniture as well as the whole of the glass façade were replaced with newer, less costly materials.

== Fate and future of the Central Department Store ==
In the 80s the former "CDT", by now renamed "Smyk", became a member of the 'Central Department Stores' group. In 2000, the 'Smyk' chain was separated from the company's department stores line and re-established as 'Smyk Sp. Zoo', a branded chain of stores with products for children. This separate line of children's stores has outlived its parent company and survives to this day. The current owner, 'CDI Smykowi', however, wants to restore the flagship Warsaw store to its former glory and re-open it as a full service department store, as was originally intended.

After the planned renovation, the building will look exactly as it was imagined by its creators. The CDT will recover many of its original features, including its original rich facade with vertical and horizontal dividing lines and window frames of Polish oak. To the rear, it is proposed to build a new extension which will replace the original second and third blocks, which are of no real architectural merit and do not have listed building status. Perhaps most importantly, it is expected that the famous neon spirals and 'CDT' titles will again be affixed to the building's façade, and that the revitalised store will operate under its original three letter acronym.

The redevelopment project was prepared by Andrzej Chołdzyński and Wojciech Grabianowski.

== Bibliography ==
- Naszemiasto Wydarzenia
- Artykul
- Architektura Nr 4 z 1952
- Architektura Nr 5 z 1948
- Architektura Nr 6 z 1958
- Express Wieczorny 19.07.1951
- Express Wieczorny 21.07.1951
- Express Wieczorny 24_27.12.1964
- Express Wieczorny 26.07.1951
- Express Wieczorny 28.11.1948
- Stolica Nr 3 z 1952
- Stolica Nr 15 z 1951
- Życie Warszawy 19.07.1951
- Życie Warszawy 21.09.1975
- Życie Warszawy 23.09.1975
- Życie Warszawy 31.01.1950
- Życie Warszawy 28.11.1948
- T. Przemysław Szafer "Współczesna architektura polska", Warszawa 1988, Arkady, str.55-57
