= Mazur Commission =

Polish government commission

The Mazur Commission (sometimes known as the Mazur-Wasilewski Commission) was a government commission in the Polish People's Republic tasked with investigating cases of unlawful conduct in the country's military courts and assessing the roles of some of their agents and officers. The commission produced a list of accused, but most cases were not prosecuted because the alleged perpetrators had died.

== Mandate ==
On 10 December 1956, the Polish government created the Mazur Commission to investigate allegations of unlawful conduct in the military courts (including the highest military court), the counter-espionage Military Information Directorate, and the Chief Military Prosecutor Office during the Stalinist period (1948–1954). The commission was also charged with examining the role of particular agents and officers of these institutions. It focused on employees' alleged "procedural, evidence, and factual" infractions.

The commission's scope was limited to central institutions and institutions based in the capital Warsaw; it did not investigate the activities of regional military courts. Consequently, thousands of cases of dubious civilians sentences by these courts were left uninvestigated.

The commission was named after Marian Mazur, the initial director of the commission, who, after being appointed Public Prosecutor General of Poland, was replaced on 18 March 1957 by Jan Wasilewski.

== Results ==
The commission's final report produced a list of accused military judges, prosecutors, and investigating officers, and their victims. However, many cases were dismissed or not indictable because the alleged perpetrators of the crimes had by then already died. Polish professor of criminology Błażej Kaucz notes that post-communist critics of the commission argued that it was a failure because abuses were not stopped but continued elsewhere, with more care taken to hide them from public view.
