= Franciszek Kamiński =

Polish general (1902–2000)

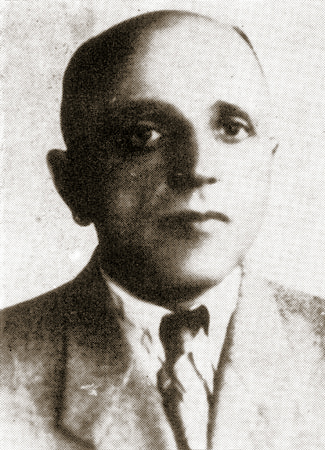
- Nicknames: Olsza, Kowal, Zenon Trawiński
- Born: Franciszek Wawrzyniec Kamiński; 20 September 1902; Mikułowice, Opatów County, Congress Poland, Russian Empire
- Died: 24 February 2000 (aged 97) Warsaw, Poland
- Rank: Major general
- Conflicts: Polish–Soviet War, World War II
- Education: University of Warsaw

Franciszek Wawrzyniec Kamiński, pseudonym: „Olsza”, „Kowal”, „Zenon Trawiński” (20 September 1902 – 24 February 2000) was a Polish politician and military leader, commander of the Peasant Battalions during World War II. After the war, he was a member of the State National Council and the Legislative Sejm. Imprisoned for political reasons during the Stalinist period (from 1950 to 1956).

== Biography ==
He came from a peasant family. He was active in scouting. In 1920, during the Polish–Soviet War, he volunteered for the Polish Army.

From 1926 to 1929, he studied at the Faculty of Mathematics and Philosophy of the University of Warsaw. He received military training, after which he was appointed a reserve officer. He was an activist of the Polish People's Party "Wyzwolenie" and People's Party. He participated in the organization of 1937 peasant strike in Poland. Maciej Rataj, fearing the delegation of the party by the Sanation authorities, entrusted him with securing the property of the People's Party.

After the German invasion of Poland, he started to create underground structures of the peasant movement. Initially, he was in favor of including peasants in the Union of Armed Struggle. However, the reluctant attitude of the leadership of this formation to the People's Party led to the decision to create a separate organization. Already at the beginning of 1940 he made such a proposal to the Central Leadership of the People's Movement.

In August 1940, the Peasant Guard was created (in the spring of 1941 it changed its name to Peasant Battalions). Franciszek Kamiński was appointed commander of this formation and held this function until the end of World War II.

In 1942, during the ethnic cleansing of Zamojszczyzna by Nazi Germany organized speeches by peasant guerrilla units against the occupation forces. In March 1943, he merged the Peasant Battalions with the Home Army. In 1944, he became a member of the Home Army Headquarters. He participated in the Warsaw Uprising. After his fall, together with other peasant movement activists, he found himself in Podkowa Leśna.

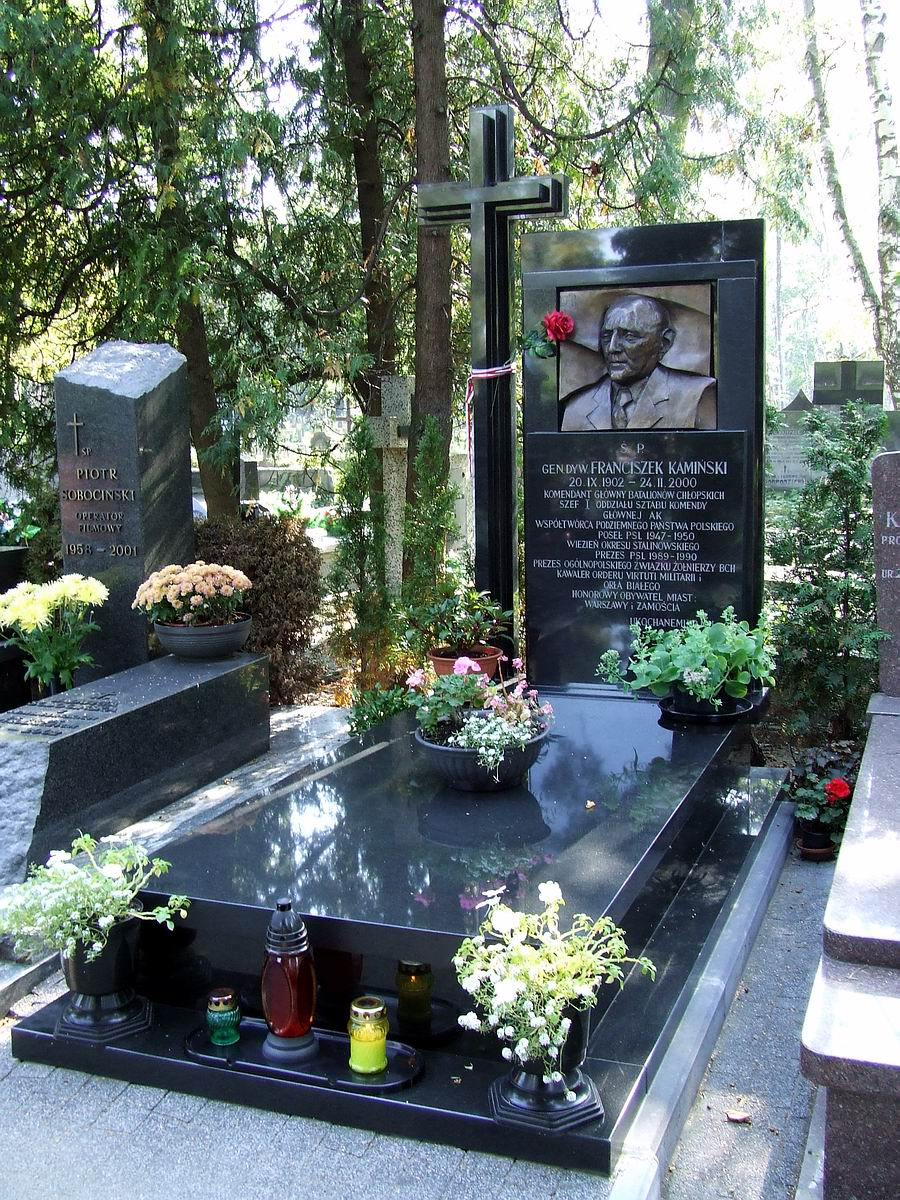
The grave of general Franciszek Kamiński at the Powązki Military Cemetery in Warsaw

In August 1945, he revealed himself to the communist Polish authorities as a lieutenant colonel. After the war, he became one of the closest associates of Stanisław Mikołajczyk, then deputy prime minister. He was active in the Polish People's Party. In December 1945, he became a member of the State National Council. In the 1947 Polish legislative election, he was elected a member of the Legislative Sejm.

In May 1949, he was expelled from the Polish People's Party because he did not want to make a self-criticism. On 21 July 1950, he was arrested by the Stalinist authorities. In December 1951, by a verdict of the Military Court, he was sentenced to 12 years in prison and forfeiture of all property. He was in prison in Warsaw.

He was released as a result of an amnesty in April 1956. In October the same year, the College of Judges of the Supreme Military Court in Warsaw overruled his judgment and discontinued the proceedings. After being released, he started working as an official. He retired in 1973. He no longer undertook active political activities.

From 1957 to 1959 he presided and managed the work of the Historical Commission of Peasant Battalions established at the United People's Party. In 1970 he initiated the independent celebrations of the 50th anniversary of the Battle of Warsaw.

In October 1980, the Polish Council of State promoted him to the rank of brigadier general. In 1982 he joined the Social Committee for the Construction of the Monument of Wincenty Witos in Warsaw. From 1988 he was a member of the Council for the Protection of Struggle and Martyrdom Sites.

On 5 May 1990, he was elected the honorary president of the reactivated Polish People's Party. In 1992 he became the president of the National Association of Peasant Battalion Soldiers. In 1993 President of Poland Lech Wałęsa promoted him to the rank of major general. In 1996 he received the Order of the White Eagle, the highest Polish award. He was buried at the Powązki Military Cemetery.

== Awards ==
- Order of the White Eagle (3 May 1996)
- Silver Cross of Virtuti Militari
- Commander's Cross of Order of Polonia Restituta
- Order of the Cross of Grunwald, 2nd Class (1972)
- Golden Cross of Merit with Swords (1944)
- Cross of Valour (1945)
- Partisan Cross
- Warsaw Uprising Cross (1 August 1981)
- Cross of Peasant Battalions

== Legacy ==
- In August 2003, a monument to general Franciszek Kamiński was unveiled in Lublin.
- In October 2007 the museum and hall of memory dedicated to him were opened.
- In 1993 he became Honorary citizenship of Warsaw
- Honorary citizenship of Zamość
