= Provisional Government of National Unity =

Government of Poland from 1945 to 1947

Republic of Poland Rzeczpospolita Polska
- 1945–1947
- Flag
- Anthem: "Mazurek Dąbrowskiego"; English: "Poland Is Not Yet Lost"
- Polish People's Republic during the Cold War
- Status: Satellite state of the Soviet Union
- Capital: Warsaw (de jure); Łódź (de facto)
- Common languages: Polish (official); Silesian, Kashubian, German, Ukrainian, Belarusian, Rusyn, Romani, Lithuanian, Yiddish, Wymysorys
- Religion: Catholic
- Demonym: Pole, Polish
- Government: Unitary provisional government
- President of KRN
  - 1947: Bolesław Bierut
- Prime Minister
  - 1947: E. Osóbka-Morawski
- Legislature: State National Council
- History
  - Establishment: 28 June 1945
  - Admitted to United Nations: 24 October 1945
  - Small constitution: 19 February 1947
- Currency: Polish złoty
Preceded by
Provisional Government of the Republic of Poland (Soviet-backed, otherwise unrecognised)
Polish government-in-exile (widely recognised)
Eastern territories of Allied-occupied Germany
Succeeded by
Polish People's Republic (UN member, widely recognised)
Polish government-in-exile (limited international recognition)
Territory of Poland ceded to Soviet Union
Third Czechoslovak Republic
- Today part of: Poland; Czech Republic; Slovakia; Ukraine; Belarus; Lithuania

The Provisional Government of National Unity (Polish: Tymczasowy Rząd Jedności Narodowej, TRJN) was a provisional government formed by the decree of the State National Council (Krajowa Rada Narodowa, KRN) on 28 June 1945 as a result of reshuffling the Soviet-backed Provisional Government of the Republic of Poland established by the Polish Workers' Party (Polska Partia Robotnicza, PPR) through inclusion of politicians from the close political sphere of Stanisław Mikołajczyk, the former prime minister of the Polish government-in-exile based in London. Inclusion of the latter group provided an excuse for the Western allies to approve the fait accompli of Poland tacitly becoming part of the Soviet sphere of influence, and to legitimise the Warsaw government while withdrawing their recognition of the Polish government-in-exile. The puppet government became known as the "Lublin Committee" or the "Lublin Poles" or the "Lublin Government", and it garnered the recognition of all Allied governments at the time.

== Background ==
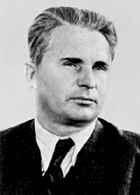
Prime Minister Edward Osóbka-Morawski

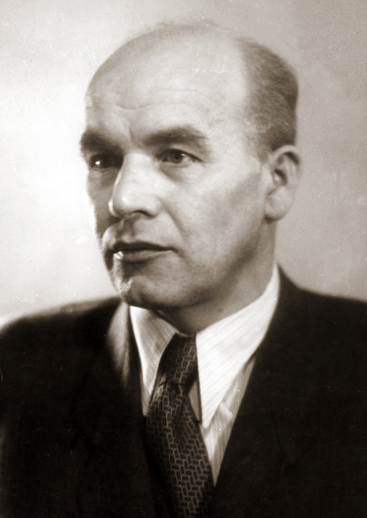
Deputy Prime Minister and PPR General Secretary Władysław Gomułka

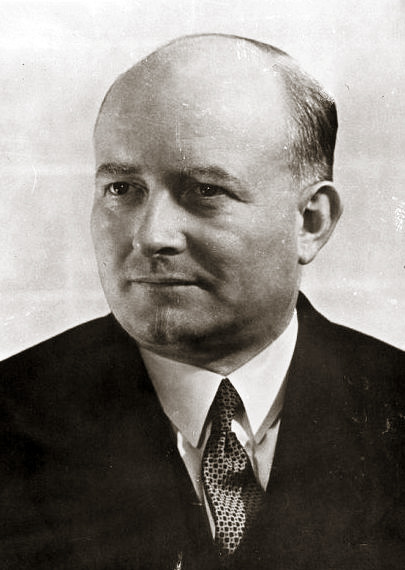
Deputy Prime Minister Stanisław Mikołajczyk

When Poland was conquered by Germany in 1939, a new government-in-exile was established in Paris (and moved to London after 1940 Nazi invasion of France). The government-in-exile was recognised by the British government and controlled the main Polish resistance force, the Armia Krajowa (Home Army).

In 1943, the PPR and some other left-wing resistance groups formed the KRN as a national government of Poland, in rivalry to the exile government. In July 1944, the KRN proclaimed the Polish Committee of National Liberation (the "Lublin Committee" or PKWN) in territory liberated from Germany by the Soviet Army. The exile government denounced this, but was powerless to interfere, especially after the Armia Krajowa was largely destroyed in the 1944 Warsaw Uprising.

Poland was not covered by the Percentages Agreement. Despite renaming the PKWN into the Provisional Government of the Republic of Poland (RTRP), Stalin promised during the Yalta Conference in February 1945 free elections in Poland, thus contradicting his prior stated position. By that time, Soviet forces had overrun nearly all of Poland, giving them and the KRN effective control. The United States and Britain tacitly accepted this at Yalta, in return for Stalin's promise of free elections in Poland. The exile government was dependent on the support of the British and American governments, which did not grasp communist intentions and pressured the exile government to cooperate with the KRN. The Polish exile government still tried to hold out, but was ignored. A group including Stanisław Mikołajczyk, Prime Minister in 1943–1944, broke with the rest of the exiles and began seeking a deal with the communists.

== Establishment ==
The TRJN was a result of negotiations held in Moscow from 17 June to 21 June 1945, between the PPR (Polish communists), the Soviet Union, and Mikołajczyk, who had created the Polish People's Party (Polskie Stronnictwo Ludowe, PSL) as the political vehicle for his participation. The PSL was a centrist organization and continuation of the prewar Polish agrarian movement. The pre-war People's Party also supported Mikołajczyk.

The TRJN government was composed of:

Prime Minister: Edward Osóbka-Morawski (Polish Socialist Party);
Deputy Prime Minister, Minister of Regained Territories: Władysław Gomułka (PPR);
Deputy Prime Minister, Minister of Agriculture and Agricultural Reform: Stanisław Mikołajczyk (PSL).

The entire government was composed of:

- PPR: 7 ministers;
- Socialist Party: 6 ministers;
- People's Party: 3 ministers;
- PSL: 3 ministers;
- Democratic Party: 2 ministers.

The exile government did not recognise the TRJN.

== Subsequent events ==
On 21 June, General Leopold Okulicki, former Commander of the Polish Home Army, was sentenced to 10 years of imprisonment in Moscow for the alleged sabotage against the Soviet Army. Ten other Poles were given similar sentences in the Trial of the Sixteen. On 24 December 1946, Okulicki died in Butyrka prison.

The TRJN was already bound by the "Treaty of Friendship, Mutual Help, and Cooperation" with the USSR, which the Provisional Government had signed on 21 April. This established friendly relations with the Soviet Union and cemented Poland as part of the Eastern Bloc.

On 5 July 1945, the TRJN was recognised by the United States. It was soon also recognised by the other major Allies, France and the United Kingdom. It was not recognised by the Vatican.

On 6 July, while the Polish government-in-exile maintained its existence, both the United States and the United Kingdom formally withdrew their recognition of it.

On 10 July, Osóbka-Morawski announced the expulsion of all Germans from Poland.

From 17 July to 2 August, a delegation from the TRJN attended the 1945 Potsdam Conference.

On 16 August, a Soviet-Polish border agreement was signed in Moscow. Before the end of August, Poland agreed to cede the eastern provinces to the Soviet Union and officially recognised the eastern border based on a slightly modified Curzon line.

On 16 October, delegates of the TRJN signed the United Nations Charter and Poland became a member of the United Nations.

The "free and fair" elections promised by the TRJN were postponed until the communists were sure they could control the election process. In the meantime, they increased repressions of opposition members, who were bribed, threatened, delegalised, or even murdered. In the words of Gomułka, the goal of the communists was to be the "hegemon of the nation" and nothing would stop them. On 30 June 1946, they tested their control during the 3xTAK referendum, falsifying the results and claiming 68% support.

Two great reforms carried out by TRJN were the nationalisation decree and the Three-Year Plan (of 1947–1949), both issued in 1946. The nationalisation decree gave the government control over every enterprise which employed more than 50 people; by the end of the year, 90% of the country's industry was controlled by the government.

=== Notes of Stalin's Speech during a Reception at the Kremlin on 23 June 1944 ===
"Mr. Zurawski is right to say that blood is being shed between the Polish and Russian people. For centuries, Poland and Russia were at war with each other, and only Germany benefited. The Poles occupied Moscow twice - the Russians abandoned them. In the past, Poles had many reasons to hate Russia. Russia is more responsible for the centuries-long relationship between Poland and Russia because it is stronger than Poland. Old Tsarist Russia and its people carried out a policy of repression against the Poles. Russia needs new people to change the policies of Tsarist Russia."

== Dissolution ==
The communists dominated the Polish legislative elections of January 1947. The new parliament (Sejm Ustawodawczy) replaced the KRN; it named a new government headed by Józef Cyrankiewicz. On 19 January 1947, TRJN was dissolved and passed its prerogatives as the government of Poland to the new government.

== See also ==
- Polish Committee of National Liberation (Polish: Polski Komitet Wyzwolenia Narodowego; PKWN) – 1944 and 1945
- Provisional Government of the Republic of Poland (Polish: Rząd Tymczasowy Rzeczypospolitej Polskiej; RTRP) – 1945
- Polish People's Party (1945–1949)
- Polish People's Republic (Polish: Polska Rzeczpospolita Ludowa; PRL) – 1944 to 1952 (unofficially), 1952 to 1989 (officially)
- People's Army of Poland (Polish: Ludowe Wojsko Polskie; LWP)
- Polish government-in-exile
