= Polish People's Party (disambiguation) =

The Polish People's Party is a Polish agrarian political party.

Polish People's Party may also refer to:

- Polish People's Party "Piast" (1913–31)
- Polish People's Party "Wyzwolenie", active in the interwar period
- Polish People's Party (Czechoslovakia), active in the 1920s
- Polska Partia Ludowa (Czechoslovakia)
- Polish People's Party "Left", active in the 1920s
- People's Party, union of PSL Wyzwolenie, PSL Piast and Stronnictwo Chłopskie
- Polish People's Party (1945–49)
- Polish People's Party "Nowe Wyzwolenie", active after World War II
- United People's Party, satellite party of Polish United Workers' Party in Polish People's Republic
- Polish People's Party-Peasants' Agreement, active since 1991 to 1999
- Polska Partia Ludowa (Lithuania), founded in 2002
- Polish People's Party "Piast" (founded 2006)
