= List of Polish Workers' Party politicians =

A list of notable Polish politicians and members of the defunct Polish Workers' Party (Polish: Polska Partia Robotnicza).

== B ==
- Jakub Berman
- Bolesław Bierut
- Jerzy Borejsza

== F ==
- Paweł Finder

== G ==
- Władysław Gomułka

== H ==
- Tadeusz Hołuj

== J ==
- Mieczysław Jagielski
- Piotr Jaroszewicz
- Wojciech Jaruzelski
- Stefan Jędrychowski
- Franciszek Jóźwiak

== K ==
- Stanisław Kania
- Leon Kasman
- Czesław Kiszczak
- Zenon Kliszko
- Władysław Kowalski
- Jan Krasicki
- Leon Kruczkowski

== L ==
- Józef Lewartowski

== M ==
- Władysław Machejek
- Stefan Michnik
- Kazimierz Mijal
- Hilary Minc
- Mieczysław Moczar
- Zygmunt Modzelewski
- Bolesław Mołojec

== N ==
- Zenon Nowak
- Marceli Nowotko

== O ==
- Edward Ochab

== P ==
- Julian Przyboś
- Janusz Przymanowski

== R ==
- Michał Rola-Żymierski
- Józef Różański

== S ==
- Leon Schiller
- Florian Siwicki
- Włodzimierz Sokorski
- Marian Spychalski
- Stefan Staszewski

== W ==
- Aleksander Wachniewski
- Wiktor Woroszylski

== Z ==
- Roman Zambrowski
- Aleksander Zawadzki
- Jerzy Ziętek

== Ś ==
- Karol Świerczewski
