= 1937 peasant strike in Poland =

Also known as the Great Peasant Uprising

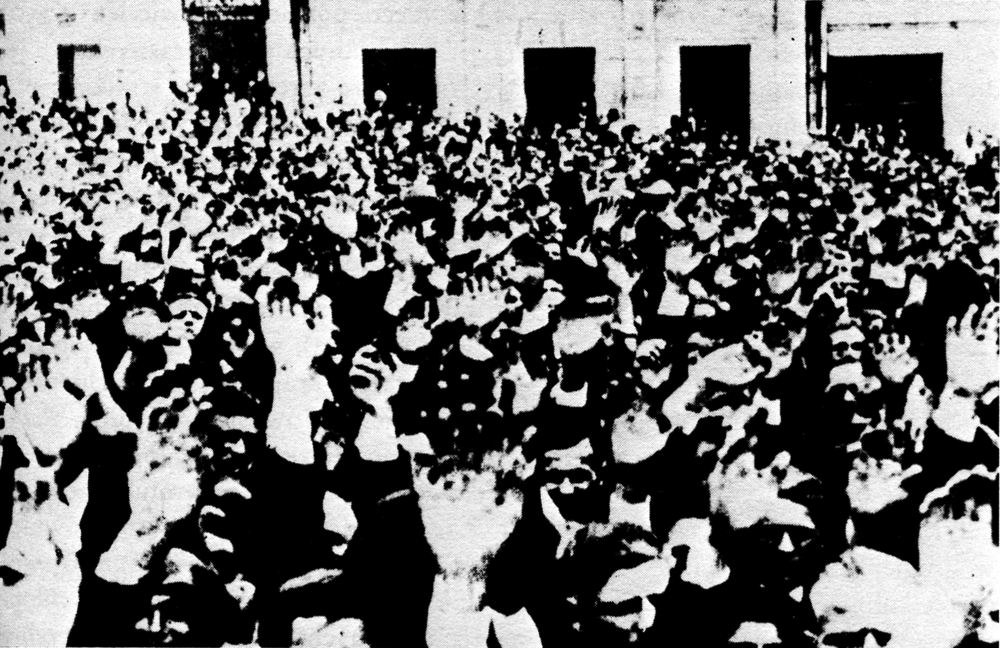
- Peasants voting to participate in the strike (Przeworsk, 1937)
- Date: August 16–25, 1937

Parties
Polish peasants, Ukrainians, Belarusians; People's Party; Communist Party of Poland	Second Polish Republic

Lead figures
Stanisław Mikołajczyk; Wincenty Witos	Felicjan Slawoj-Skladkowski

1937 Peasant Strike in Poland, also known in some Polish sources as the Great Peasant Uprising (Polish: Wielki Strajk Chłopski) was a mass strike and demonstration of peasants organized by the People's Party and aimed at the ruling sanacja government. It was the largest political protest in the Second Polish Republic, taking place in 12 voivodeships of the Second Polish Republic. It is estimated that several million peasants took part in the demonstrations, and the strike was supported not only by Polish peasants, but also by the Ukrainian and Belarusian farmers, who made a majority in the eastern part of the Second Polish Republic.

== Background ==
By mid-1930s, Poland, a country with a large agricultural sector, was significantly affected by the Great Depression, with peasants being one of the most affected groups. Polish peasantry, especially in overpopulated areas of Lesser Poland, was desperately poor. Prices of food products fell down, which resulted in smaller profits for the peasants. In some provinces, the countryside went backwards to the 19th century, with imminent prospect of hunger. Unemployment among youth in villages was widespread, which frustrated and radicalized the impoverished people. Furthermore, the increasingly authoritarian sanacja government was losing public support. Immediately after the May Coup, some leaders of peasant parties hoped that cooperation with the new government was possible. However, further events, such as the destruction of Centrolew, the arrest of Wincenty Witos, and the ill-fated 1930 election deeply disappointed all of them. In response to the actions of the government, in 1931 a new political party of the peasants, the agrarian People's Party (Stronnictwo Ludowe, SL) was created out of three smaller parties. SL leaders, who by mid-1930s became more radical, emphasized the numbers and physical strength of the Polish peasantry. They claimed that peasants were real hosts of the country.

In an attempt to wrest political power, the SL organized a series of large demonstrations and strikes, which were often met with government opposition. Over the years, violent incidents occurred leading to fatalities. Peasants' protests were frequent, and in all cases, they were brutally suppressed by the sanacja regime. One of the most notable events of this kind was a large wave of strikes that took place in 1932-33 in southern Poland, in the area of Lapanow, Lesko, and Ropczyce. Instead of negotiating, the government would send armed police or units of the Polish Army, which pacified villages and sometimes killed the demonstrators. It has been estimated that across the 1930s, around 100 peasants were killed by the security forces.

The idea of the strike did not meet with unanimous approval. The marginal Communist Party of Poland (Komunistyczna Partia Polski, KPP) threw its weight behind the strike, but the right-wing National Party (Stronnictwo Narodowe, SN) was opposed to it. Crucially, Polish Socialist Party (Polska Partia Socjalistyczna, PPS) declined to participate in it, so despite KPP support, the strike did not spread to the cities, as SL hoped. Nonetheless, some worker strikes did occur during that period. Even within SL, not all activists were convinced it was a good idea; it was supported by Wincenty Witos and Stanisław Mikołajczyk, but criticized by Maciej Rataj.

The decision to start the strike was the effect of new tactics, worked out during the Extraordinary Congress of the People's Party (SL), which took place on January 17, 1937, in Warsaw. On that day it was decided that if the government did not meet the demands of the SL, a general peasant strike would be called. Participants in the Congress signed an appeal that demanded democratization of the country, amnesty for politicians sentenced in the Brest trials, and changes in the Constitution. The strike was organized by Stanisław Mikołajczyk, and by Wincenty Witos, who had been forced to leave Poland and lived in Czechoslovakia. Using his couriers, Witos sent advice and instructions.

A prelude to the strike took place on April 18, 1937, when peasants organized a large demonstration in the fields of Racławice, the site of a 1792 battle in which Polish peasant soldiers played a decisive role. On that day, thousands of people gathered, unaware of the fact that Minister Felicjan Slawoj-Skladkowski had forbidden public demonstrations and meetings. The rally was attacked by the police, which killed three peasants.

== The Strike ==
August 15 was the Holiday of Peasant Deed (Święto Czynu Chłopskiego), a holiday introduced to honor the participation of Polish peasants in the Polish-Soviet War. On that day, numerous rallies took place, during which a 10-day nationwide peasant strike was announced. These rallies were carefully organized, as they were supposed to show the power of the peasant movement. One of the biggest events of this kind took place on the market square in Kolbuszowa. Those present marched with the green flags of Polish peasants. During speeches, people were urged to start open struggle until full victory, in the spirit of 1920. Peasants were told that the Miracle at the Vistula was not a miracle, but a victory of peasant soldiers. Chants such as "Down with the sanacja government" were heard, as were calls for the release of political prisoners. Participants in the strike pledged not to send food to towns and cities, and to block the roads. Timing was crucial, as in mid-August, old food supplies in the cities had been exhausted, and deliveries of new goods were expected to cover shortages. SL activists, who created the Peasant Order Guard (Chlopska Straz Porzadkowa) watched the roads, urging peasants not to weasel out of the strike. The biggest August 15 rallies took place in Jarosław, Grebow, Dębica, Przeworsk, Bochnia, and Ciezkowice.

The strike began on August 16, 1937 and lasted (as planned) until August 25. SL leaders kept the date of the beginning of the strike as top secret. In his memoirs, an SL activist from Bochnia wrote: "Everything was carefully prepared. Members of Kraków's district of the party came to our village, instructing us what to do and how to act in case of trouble. We were told to light bonfires on August 14, as a sign that a large meeting of peasants was approaching". Rallies were organized not only in villages and towns, but also in cities. In Kraków, on Sunday, August 15, thousands of peasants with banners and orchestras gathered in the Jablonowski Square. A peasant from Bienczyce, Jakub Pszczoła, gave a speech, in which he announced that the strike would begin on the next day. After his speech, leaflets were spread among those gathered, and peasants began singing their informal anthem "Gdy naród do boju" ("When The Nation Fights"). The leaflets informed about demands of the strikers, such as dissolution of the Parliament, the release of political prisoners, change of the Constitution, and just distribution of social goods.

Although SL leadership hoped that the action would cover the whole country except for border and ethnically mixed areas, in reality, it was successful only in the southern part of the Lesser Poland (Małopolska) region, with major events taking place in eastern counties of the Kraków Voivodeship, and western counties of the Lwów Voivodeship, particularly in the Jarosław County, where the SL structures were the strongest. Peasant demonstrators blockaded roads and stopped food deliveries to the cities, and at first, the government tolerated the action, regarding it as legal, and convinced that the SL would not be able to expand the protest. Also, as Felicjan Slawoj-Skladkowski stated later, SL leadership had assured that the strike would be of peaceful character. Therefore, Skladkowski had left for a two-week vacation in France, leaving Eugeniusz Kwiatkowski in charge. This indicated that the government, even though aware of the strike, did not plan to use force. One of the peasant activists from the area of Sandomierz wrote later: "In every village there was a strike committee, with deputies in case of arrests. There were self-reliance organizations, which collected food and money for those incarcerated. Also, families of arrested activists were offered help during the harvest time".

After a few days, however, this stance was changed and terror was introduced. The change was also spurred by the actions of the peasants themselves, who had become more radical. SL activists created groups of 4 - 10 mostly young men, who were armed with sticks, and watched all roads. They did not hesitate to use force against the strikebreaker, beating them, killing their horses, destroying produce, and overturning their wagons. In some cases, radical activists attacked houses of the strikebreakers. In the course of the time, the strike turned into an uprising, which was noticed by activists of the Polish Communist Party, who appeared in the area, with their propaganda (in their appeal to the nation, the communist stated "Let the cities and villages die! Long live the nationwide strike! They will not arrest millions"). First skirmishes took place in the area of Jarosław on August 17, where members of the Peasants' Order Guard fought the police. On the same day, in Grebow near Tarnobrzeg, first peasant was killed. In response, the peasants blocked the main road of southern Poland, route Kraków - Lwów (in the area of Brzesko), where transport of all goods was halted. Local police commandant wrote in his report: "On the roads and in their vicinity there are gangs of peasants armed with knives, sticks, perhaps guns. We are defenseless against them. Today, they have formed a march of around 500, which started from Wielka Wies. On the way, more people joined them. Economy in our area has been completely paralyzed. We are requesting help and awaiting orders". General Marian Kukiel wrote to Wladyslaw Sikorski: "The police are completely exhausted. There are losses. There are no police units in Kraków. If the communists were a significant force, they would be taking advantage of this situation".

Actions of the police were described as cruel and barbarian. Officers beat peasants, their wives and children with batons, rallies were dispersed, and during revisions in houses, furniture and goods were destroyed. The police, of whom 108 were wounded, never tried to negotiate, instead, they used not only batons, but also guns, firing at the crowds without warning. Approximately 5,000 peasants were detained, 617 arrested, and in some cases, violence on both sides lead to fatalities (44 peasant demonstrators were killed during the strike, 15 of them coming from the village of Majdan Sieniawski, in Przeworsk county). Among counties with most people arrested, there were:

- Jarosław County - 61 arrested,
- Brzozów County - 47 arrested,
- Rzeszów County - 16 arrested,
- Przemyśl County - 16 arrested.

About 700 farms were pacified, as the police used the doctrine of collective responsibility. The number of wounded is difficult to estimate, as in many situations, the peasants did not go to hospitals, fearing arrest. Nevertheless, despite the repressions, the peasants showed their strength, determination and organizational abilities. SL leaders deliberately chose not to organize the strike in the border areas of the country - Pomerania, Upper Silesia, Volhynia, and the areas of Tarnopol and Wilno, as deterioration of social situation in those strategic and vulnerable provinces, inhabited by ethnic minorities, was unwanted by them. Also, since SL structures in Mazovia, Podlasie, Greater Poland, and northern Lesser Poland (areas of Kielce, Lublin, and Radom) were not as strong as those in the south, the strike there was of a limited character and did not evolve into a mass protest.

== Outcome ==
Since the mutual violence of the peasants and the police, among whom there were units of freshly created riot police, was getting out of hand, on August 20 SL leadership decided to stop the strike. The police, which at first was shocked at the magnitude of the protest, took their revenge, pacifying villages and beating participants. This in return provoked hatred of the villagers. First processes of the arrested peasants began in December 1937 in the court in Przemyśl. Altogether, around 1000 people were sentenced to up to 5 years. Many of them stayed behind bars until September 1939, when prison guards left their posts behind, escaping the advancing German troops.

The strike failed to shift the official balance of power, as sanacja remained in control. However, it strengthened the Polish peasant movement, and was seen by the peasant activist as a successful demonstration of force. SL activists wanted to organize another strike in 1938, but due to deteriorating international situation, and growing threat of German aggression, it was called off. During World War II, those who took part in the 1937 strike, organized Polish Peasants' Battalions, and after the war, they opposed introduction of the Communist system.
