= Maria Sowina =

Polish politician

Maria Sowina (born 1900, death date unknown) was a Polish politician from the People's Party.

In 1928 she became a member of the Youths Rural Organisation. She joined the People's Party in 1931, and was the first woman elected to the central committee and parliament of the party.
