= 1946 Polish people's referendum =

Post-WWII political referendum in Poland

- 30 June 1946
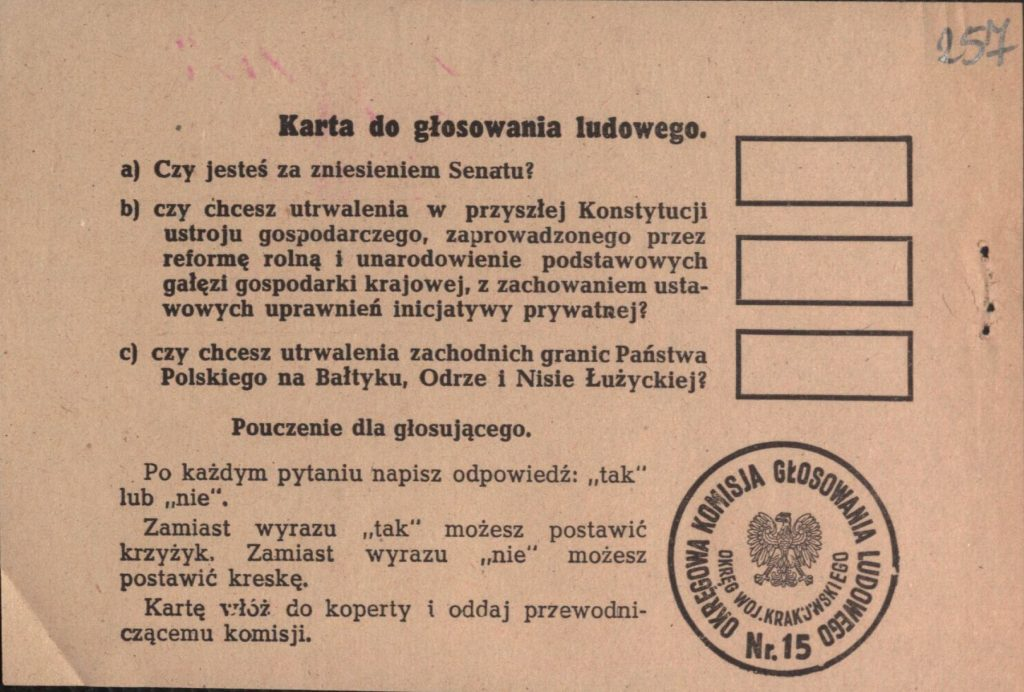
- Ballot paper for the referendum

1. Are you in favour of abolishing the Senate?
Yes	68.03%
No	31.97%

2. Do you want consolidation, in the future constitution of the economic system founded on agricultural reform and the nationalisation of basic national industries, including the preservation of the statutory rights of private enterprise?
Yes	77.15%
No	22.85%

3. Do you want consolidation of the western border of the Polish State on the Baltic, Oder river and Lusatian Neisse?
Yes	91.36%
No	8.64%

A three-question referendum was held in Poland on 30 June 1946. Known as the people's referendum (Polish: referendum ludowe) or three times yes referendum (Trzy razy tak, often abbreviated as 3×TAK) it was held as a result of a State National Council order of 27 April 1946. The referendum presented an opportunity for the forces vying for political control of Poland following World War II to test their popularity among the general population. However, the results were forged and the referendum failed to meet democratic standards.

During the referendum campaign, the communists repressed the opposition led by Stanisław Mikołajczyk. Communists censored Polish People's Party (PSL) communications, disrupted PSL meetings, and mass arrested PSL members.

== Questions ==
The referendum comprised three questions:

1. Are you in favour of abolishing the Senate?
2. Do you want consolidation, in the future constitution of the economic system founded on agricultural reform and the nationalisation of basic national industries, including the preservation of the statutory rights of private enterprise?
3. Do you want consolidation of the western border of the Polish State on the Baltic, Oder river and Lusatian Neisse?

The instructions on the ballot stated:

Instructions for the voter:

After each question, write the answer: "yes" or "no".

Instead of the word "yes", you may put a cross.

Instead of the word "no", you may draw a line.

Insert the ballot into the envelope and give it to the chair of the commission.

== Campaign ==
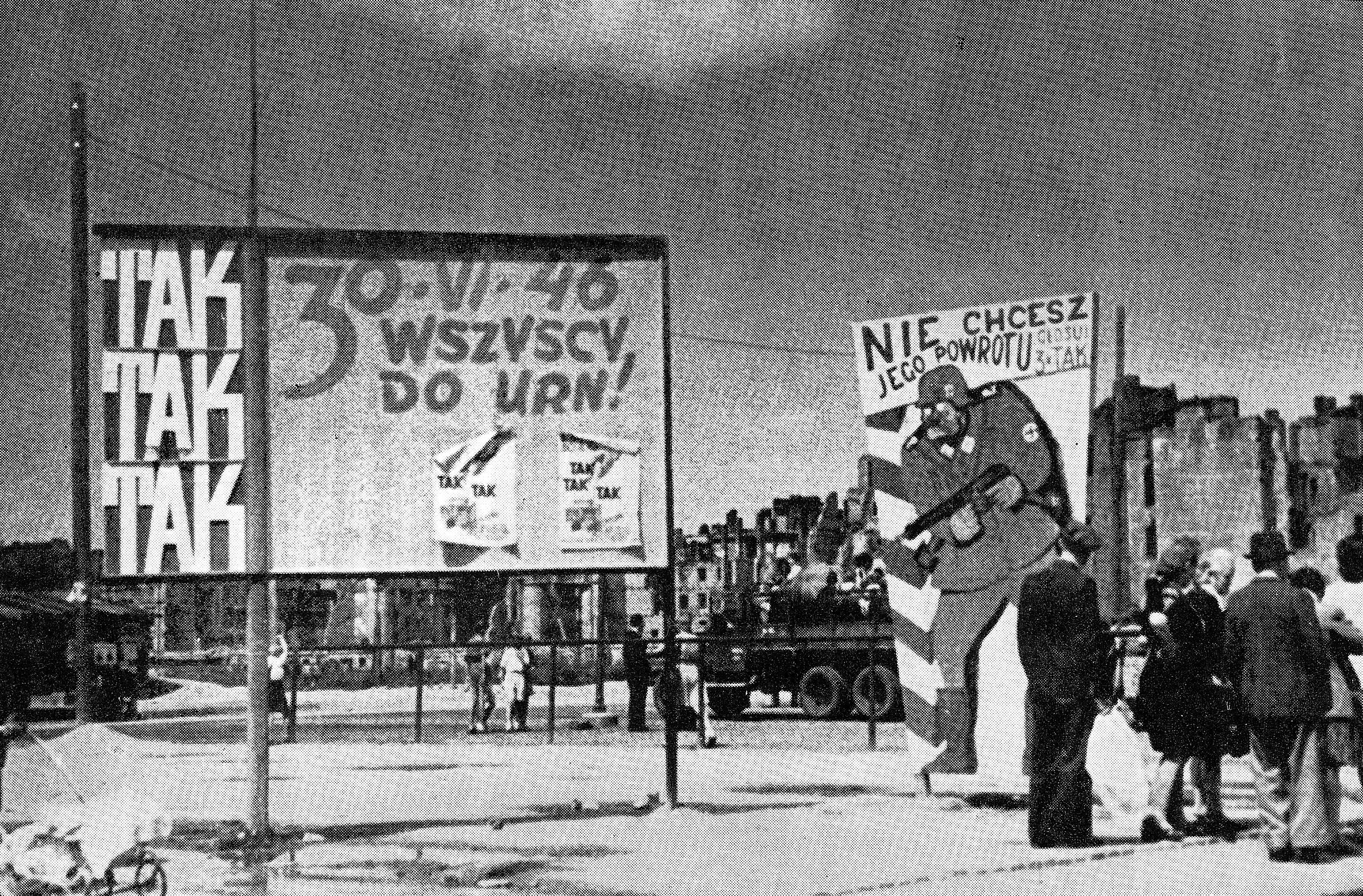
Agitation poster in Warsaw

Parties of the pro-communist Democratic Bloc, (the Polish Workers' Party (PPR), Socialist Party, Democratic Party, and People's Party) campaigned heavily in favor of "Three Times Yes", while non-communist parties advocated various other combinations; hence the referendum was seen as unofficially deciding whether the Polish citizenry supported or opposed communism. The Polish People's Party (PSL) and Labor Party advocated voting "no" on the first question despite the fact that it had been opposed to the Senate's existence since before the war. The majority of PSL political support was in rural areas, among people who supported agricultural reform, so the party found it impossible to advocate voting "no" on the second question. Nonetheless, the party's opposition to the first question was used by the communists to declare the more liberal PSL activists "traitors". Catholic groups supported "no" on the first question, "yes" on the third, and left the second to voters individual preferences. The Wolność i Niezawisłość party argued against the first two questions only, while the National Armed Forces advocated a "no" for all three questions, as a sign of protest against the annexation of the eastern territories of Poland (known as the Kresy) by the Soviet Union.

== Results ==
The official results, published on 12 July 1946, showed that from a population of 13,160,451 eligible voters, 90.1% or 11,857,986 had taken part in the referendum. Of these, 11,530,551 or 97.2% were counted as valid. On the first question, 68% of voters chose "yes". On the second question, 77.2% voted "yes". On the third question, 91.4% voted "yes".

However, the official results were far removed from the actual results since the vote had been seriously compromised by the communists and their supporters. The communists, who already de facto controlled much of the government and had the backing of the military (both the Polish Wojsko Ludowe and Soviet Red Army), used the police (Milicja Obywatelska) and the secret services (Urząd Bezpieczeństwa) to threaten, assault and even murder opposition activists, switch real ballots for false ones, stuff ballot boxes with false votes, consider blank ballots as "yes" votes, destroy votes not in favour of all or any of the three questions or simply falsify votes. Voting in the army was done on command and without secrecy. The falsification was overseen, just like the later 1947 Polish legislative election, by Soviet experts like Aron Palkin and Semyon Davydov, both high-ranking officers from the Soviet Ministry for State Security.

In Kraków, where the opposition managed to ensure a fair vote, the "no" results were: 84%, 59% and 30% for all three questions. PSL, which was able to obtain real records for approximately 48% of the voting districts, estimated that a "yes" for all three questions was chosen by 16.7% of respondents. Despite the protests of the opposition, led by Stanisław Mikołajczyk, and representatives of the United Kingdom and United States, the results were declared free and fair by the government.

Question	For		Against		Invalid/ blank	Total votes	Registered voters	Turnout	Outcome
Question	Votes	%	Votes	%	Invalid/ blank	Total votes	Registered voters	Turnout	Outcome
Abolition of the Senate	7,844,522	68.03	3,686,029	31.97	327,435	11,857,986	13,160,451	90.10	Approved
Economic system	8,896,105	77.15	2,634,446	22.85	327,435	11,857,986	13,160,451	90.10	Approved
Western border	10,534,697	91.36	995,854	8.64	327,435	11,857,986	13,160,451	90.10	Approved
Source: M.P. 1946 No. 61, item 115

== Aftermath ==
Following the referendum, the Allies called for democratic elections. However, the 1947 elections were "completely manipulated".

According to documents released forty-three years later, 29% of respondents had voted yes for all three questions. The official results indicated this figure was 68%. Materials published after the communists lost power in Poland in 1989 showed that only the third question received a majority of votes in favor. For the first question, "yes" was chosen by 26.9% voters. For the second question, 42% chose "yes". For the third question, 66.9% chose "yes".

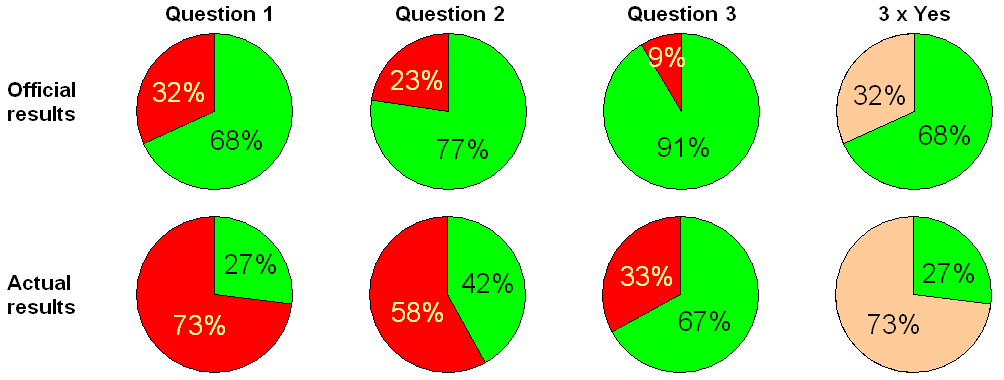
Difference between the manipulated official results and actual results for the 1946 Polish people's referendum
