= Polish People's Party "Nowe Wyzwolenie" =

Polish People's Party "Nowe Wyzwolenie" Polskie Stronnictwo Ludowe "Nowe Wyzwolenie"
- Founded: 9 June 1946
- Dissolved: November 1947
- Split from: People's Party
- Merged into: Polish People's Party
- Headquarters: Warsaw, Poland
- Ideology: Agrarianism; Agrarian socialism Secularism
- Political position: Centre-left

Polish People's Party Nowe Wyzwolenie also known as the Polish Peasant Party Nowe Wyzwolenie (meaning: New Liberation; Polish: Polskie Stronnictwo Ludowe "Nowe Wyzwolenie") was a political party founded in Warsaw on 9 June 1946 in Poland soon after the defeat of Germany in World War II. PSL "Nowe Wyzwolenie" formed a few months before the USSR took political control over the country, and was a Polish Worker's Party (PPR) inspired split from the Polish People's Party (PSL) opposed to the Deputy prime minister Stanisław Mikołajczyk.

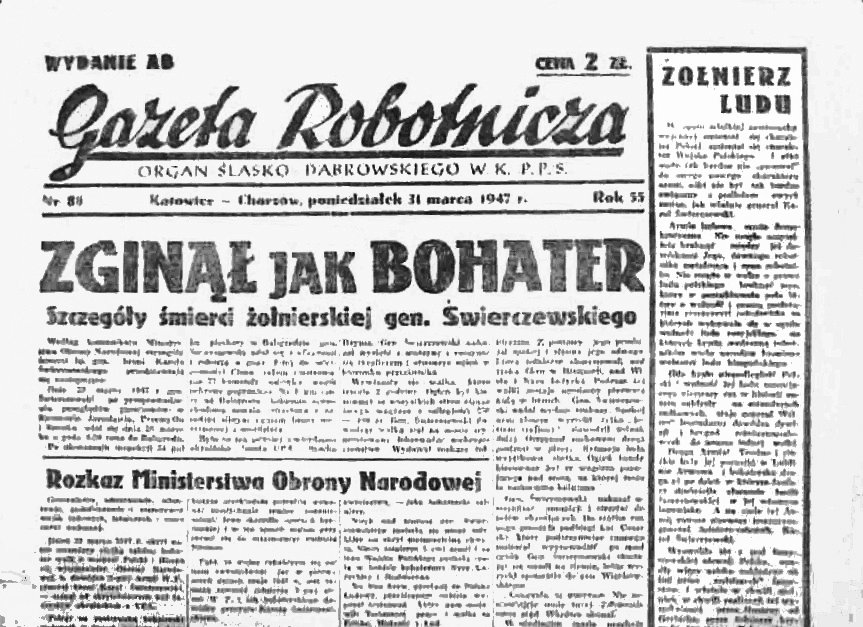
The Workers' Gazette, 1947, Katowice with orders from the Ministry of Defence

The party drew its name from the populist agrarian party active before World War II, called the Polish People's Party "Wyzwolenie" (meaning, Liberation) even though, it had little to do with its original program. PSL "Nowe Wyzwolenie" received 7 seats in the infamous 1947 Polish legislative election which was falsified with the help of Soviet MGB advisors, Stalinist Secret Police (Urząd Bezpieczeństwa, UB) and squads of heavily armed Volunteer Reserve Militia (ORMO) functionaries deployed across the country in order to ensure a communist victory by intimidation and violence.

The parliamentary candidates from the Stronnictwo Ludowe "Nowe Wyzwolenie" included Bronisław Drzewiecki, Bronisław Kloc, Władysław Kosydarski, Witold Oleszczak, Michał Rękas, Władysław Ryncarz, and Jan Witoszka. Following the elections, the party merged with the People's Party (Stronnictwo Ludowe) in Lublin. The two leaders were Tadeusz Rek and Bronisław Drzewiecki.
