= State National Council =

Communist-controlled political body in Poland from 1943 to 1947

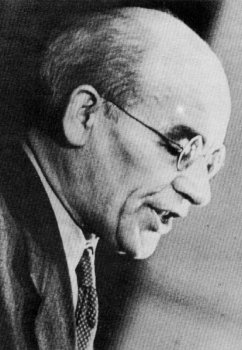
Władysław Gomułka led the Polish Workers' Party, which established the "State National Council"

Krajowa Rada Narodowa in Polish (translated as State National Council or Homeland National Council, abbreviated to KRN) was a parliament-like political body created during the later stages of World War II in German-occupied Warsaw, Poland. It was intended as a communist-controlled center of authority, challenging organs of the Polish Underground State. The existence of the KRN was later accepted by the Soviet Union and the council became to a large extent subjugated and controlled by the Soviets.

The KRN was established on the night of 31 December 1943 on the initiative of the Polish communist party, the Polish Workers' Party (PPR), then led by Władysław Gomułka. It was the implementation of the party's Central Committee decision of 7 November 1943. The council was declared to be the "actual political representation of the Polish nation, empowered to act on behalf of the nation and manage its affairs until the time of Poland's liberation from the occupation". From the beginning, the KRN viewed the prewar Sanation government and the contemporary Polish government in exile as illegitimate, based on the "elitist-totalitarian" April Constitution, "whose legality had never been recognized by the nation", and as representative of narrow reactionary interests. The new government formation would be based on the "worker-peasant alliance" and on the alliance with the Soviet Union. The Armia Ludowa was established as the KRN's armed force. The exile government and the Polish Underground State, especially the Armia Krajowa command, were worried by this development and by the progressing social radicalization in Poland by Soviet strings. They accelerated the formation of the already planned Council of National Unity (Rada Jedności Narodowej, RJN), their own parliament, created on 9 January 1944.

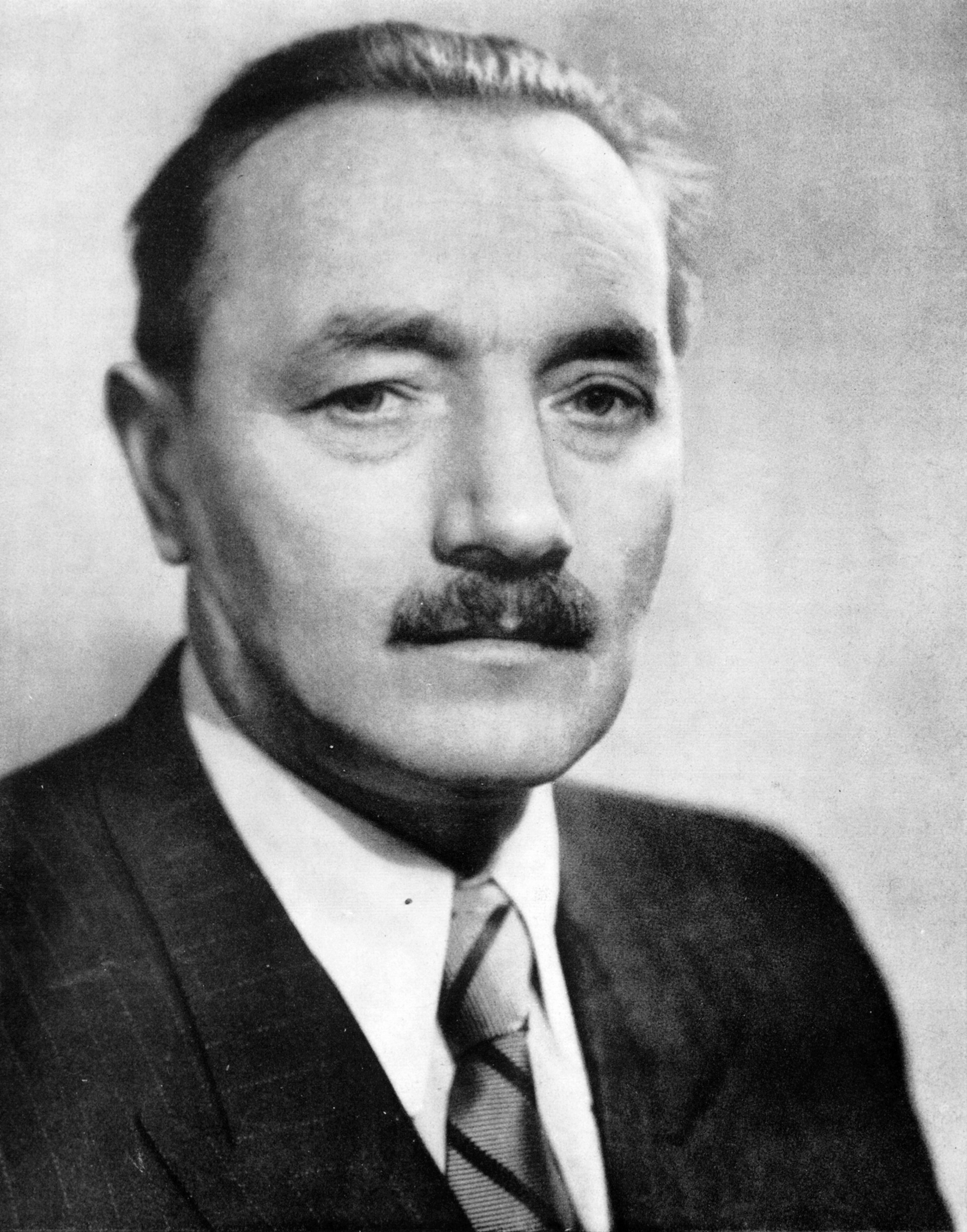
Bolesław Bierut, a Stalinist and Gomułka's rival, chaired the formal legislative body

The Soviet regime under Stalin, initially unaware of the establishment of the KRN because of the non-existent at that time communications, became critical of it until, according to the evolving international situation, the Soviets developed new ideas in respect to Poland and found the KRN to be a potentially convenient entity. A KRN delegation went to Moscow for talks with Stalin on 22 May 1944 and the body's existence was upheld.

The KRN was installed and dominated by pro-Soviet and pro-communist activists from various Polish far-left prewar parties. Attempts to broaden the KRN's base by absorbing other leftist and popular groups were unsuccessful. The left wing of the Polish Socialist Party (PPS) had also in mind a future People's Republic of Poland, but of a different variety than the communists and Soviets. The KRN included some members of the PPS, the Polish People's Party (PSL), the People's Party (SL), the Democratic Party (SD), the Labour Party (SP), non-aligned and Jewish politicians. Bolesław Bierut of the PPR became the KRN's chairman. Bierut was opposed to Gomułka's efforts to broaden the KRN's participation and a sharp conflict between the two ensued. Bierut believed in future communist rule based on the presence of the Soviet Red Army in Poland and did not want to dilute the PPR's identity and influence by the inclusion of too many other forces. The KRN's vice-chairmen were Wincenty Witos (PSL), Stanisław Grabski (nonaligned) and Stanisław Szwalbe (PPS).

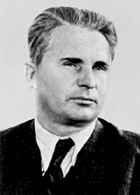
Edward Osóbka-Morawski, a socialist, was co-opted as the KRN's vice-chairman

On 22 July 1944, the KRN delegation and the Union of Polish Patriots (ZPP), having deliberated in Moscow, took it upon themselves to form a new governmental structure, the Polish Committee of National Liberation (Polski Komitet Wyzwolenia Narodowego, PKWN), which was officially established in the Lublin province. PKWN gave rise to communist-dominated governments, which later included some former members of the Polish-government-in-exile, led by Stanisław Mikołajczyk, and represented a half-hearted attempt by the communists to meet the Yalta Conference requirements of forming a coalition government and carrying out free elections. On 31 December of that year, the KRN transformed the PKWN into the Provisional Government of the Republic of Poland (Rząd Tymczasowy Republiki Polskiej, RTRP). Both early governments were headed by the socialist Edward Osóbka-Morawski.

Until the elections to parliament (Sejm), the KRN held both legislative and executive powers, and Bolesław Bierut was the head of state. In July 1945, the KRN had 273 members (97 from PPR, 77 from PPS, 56 from SL, 17 from SD, 26 non-aligned). In October 1946 it was expanded to 444 members (135 from PPR, 111 from PPS, 62 from SL, 57 from PSL, 37 from SD, 4 from SP, 3 Jewish representatives (1 each from the Bund, Communists and Zionists), 26 non-aligned).

The 1947 Polish legislative elections were rigged by the communists, who previously conducted the illegitimate Polish people's referendum of 1946. The unchallenged rule of the communists that followed, combined with extensive repressions and persecution, forced many opposition leaders to leave the country. The new Sejm, which replaced the KRN, was totally dominated by the communists and their allies until the collapse of communism in Poland in 1989.
