= Polish Workers' Party =

1942–1948 political party in Poland

Polish Workers' Party Polska Partia Robotnicza
- First leader: Marceli Nowotko
- Last leader: Bolesław Bierut
- Founded: 5 January 1942
- Dissolved: 16 December 1948
- Preceded by: KPP
- Merged into: PZPR
- Newspaper: Głos Ludu
- Youth wing: Union of Youth Struggle
- Military wing: People's Guard; People's Army
- Ideology: Communism; Marxism–Leninism; Stalinism
- Political position: Far-left
- National affiliation: Democratic Bloc (1947–1948)
- International affiliation: Comintern (1942–1943); Cominform (1947–1948)
- Colours: Red

Party flag

The Polish Workers' Party (Polish: Polska Partia Robotnicza, PPR) was a Marxist-Leninist and Stalinist political party in Poland from 1942 to 1948. It was founded as a reconstitution of the Communist Party of Poland (KPP) and forcibly absorbed the Polish Socialist Party (PPS) in 1948 to form the Polish United Workers' Party (PZPR). From the end of World War II the PPR led Poland, with the Soviet Union exercising moderate influence. During the PPR years, the centers of opposition activity were largely diminished, and a socialist system was established in the country.

Arriving from the Soviet Union, a group of Polish communists was parachuted into occupied Poland in December 1941. With Joseph Stalin's permission, in January 1942 they established the Polish Workers' Party, a new communist party. The PPR established a partisan military organization Gwardia Ludowa, later renamed Armia Ludowa. In November 1943, Władysław Gomułka became secretary (chief executive) of the Central Committee of the PPR. On 1 January 1944 the party created the State National Council (KRN), proclaimed to be a wartime parliament of Poland; the body was chaired by Bolesław Bierut. In June 1944 the Union of Polish Patriots, a rival to the PPR Polish-communist organization operating in the Soviet Union, recognized the KRN as "the true representation of the Polish nation". The PPR was initially a small party with marginal support; it grew because of its alliance with the victorious Soviet Union.

In July 1944 the Polish communists, working in close cooperation with Stalin and other Soviet leaders, established and declared in liberated Lublin a provisional executive quasi-government of Poland, which they called the Polish Committee of National Liberation (PKWN). In the PKWN Manifesto issued at that time, the PKWN claimed its authority in Poland and promised post-war reconstruction as well as land reform. The KRN and the PKWN were established when the Polish government-in-exile in London was the internationally recognized government of Poland. By the end of 1944, the PKWN was replaced by the Provisional Government of the Republic of Poland, recognized by the Soviet Union, with which it signed in April 1945 a 20-year friendship, alliance and cooperation treaty. As a result of the Yalta Conference Allied determinations, the Provisional Government was converted to a formally coalition Provisional Government of National Unity (TRJN) in June 1945. The Polish government-in-exile was excluded from participation and the PPR ended up controlling the new government, which was soon recognized by the United States, the United Kingdom, and other countries. The establishment of a permanent government was conditioned on national elections being held, as mandated by the Allies. In the meantime the PPR engaged in a massive program of rebuilding the country and its industry, in combating and containing the various forms and manifestations of opposition to its rule, but also in manipulating the election preparation process to ensure the party's lasting domination.

The 1946 Polish people's referendum and the following 1947 Polish legislative election were rigged and declared a decisive victory for the PPR's "Democratic Bloc". The only legal opposition, the Polish People's Party, was marginalized. Gomułka's victory, however, was short-lived. Pressured by the Cold War, Stalin had no more patience for the Polish leader's national brand of communism, and from August 1948 the PPR was led by Bierut. In December 1948, the PPR and the purged PPS were merged to form the PZPR. What was left of democratic and pluralistic practices and pretenses was abandoned and Poland entered its period of Stalinist rule.

== Communist Party of Poland and its demise ==
The Communist Party of Poland (KPP, until 1925 the Communist Workers' Party of Poland) was an organization of the far-left. The views adhered to and promulgated by its leaders (Maria Koszutska, Adolf Warski, Maksymilian Horwitz, Edward Próchniak) led to the party's difficult relationship with Joseph Stalin already in 1923–24. The Communist International (Comintern) condemned the KPP for its support for Józef Piłsudski's May Coup of 1926 (the party's "May error"). From 1933, the KPP was increasingly treated with suspicion by the Comintern. The party structures were seen as compromised due to infiltration by agents of the Polish military intelligence. Some of the party leaders, falsely accused of being such agents, were subsequently executed in the Soviet Union. In 1935 and 1936, the KPP undertook a formation of a unified worker and peasant front in Poland and was then subjected to further persecutions by the Comintern, which also arbitrarily accused the Polish communists of harboring rightist and Trotskyist elements in their ranks. The apogee of the Moscow-held prosecutions, aimed at eradicating the various "deviations" and ending usually in death sentences, took place in 1937–38, with the last executions carried out in 1940. The KPP members were persecuted and often imprisoned by the Polish Sanation regime, which turned out to likely save the lives of a number of future Polish communist leaders, including Bolesław Bierut, Władysław Gomułka, Edward Ochab, Stefan Jędrychowski and Aleksander Zawadzki. During the Great Purge, seventy members and candidate members of the party's Central Committee fled or were brought to the Soviet Union and were shot there, along with a large number of other activists (almost all prominent Polish communists were murdered or sent to labor camps). The Comintern, in reality directed by Stalin, had the party dissolved and liquidated in August 1938.

== The PPR's World War II foundations ==
On 28 June 1940, soon after the Katyn massacre, Stalin received Wanda Wasilewska, an unofficial leader of Polish communists, at the Moscow Kremlin. The event initiated a reorientation of Soviet policies in regard to Poles. As a result, a wide range of official political, military, social, cultural, educational and other Soviet-Polish projects and activities commenced in 1940 and continued during the years that followed.

The German attack on the Soviet Union in June 1941 changed the course of World War II and with it the nature of Polish-Soviet governmental relations. Pressured by the British government, the London-based Polish government-in-exile, led by Władysław Sikorski, signed an agreement with the Soviet Union, which included a Soviet recognition of the Polish government. A Polish army was formed in the Soviet Union, but was soon taken out of there and into the Middle East by Władysław Anders. The Katyn massacre perpetrated by the Soviets on Polish POWs was revealed and the Soviet Union "suspended" diplomatic relations with the Polish government. Prime Minister Sikorski was killed in an airplane crash in July 1943. These and other factors, including disagreements about future borders, caused the Polish-Soviet relations to deteriorate.

Meanwhile, Stalin, beginning in the summer of 1941, pursued other Polish options, utilizing Polish communists and other Poles willing to cooperate, many of whom were present at that time in the Soviet Union. Polish language radio broadcasts began in August 1941; they called upon the Poles in Poland to unconditionally engage in anti-German resistance. Some prewar Polish officers were transferred to occupied Poland to conduct pro-Soviet conspiratorial activities and the Polish communists worked in November on organizing the Poles in the Soviet Union. Among the communist groups that became active in Poland after Operation Barbarossa was the Union for Liberating Struggle (Związek Walki Wyzwoleńczej), whose leaders included Marian Spychalski.

A September 1941 attempt to transport activists from the Soviet Union to Poland was unsuccessful, but beginning in late December, a group of Polish communists which included Marceli Nowotko, Paweł Finder, Bolesław Mołojec and Małgorzata Fornalska, was parachuted into Poland. They had Stalin's permission to create a new Polish communist party. In Polish society the communists could count on marginal support only, so to avoid negative connotations it was decided not to include the word "communist" in the party's title. The party took the name "Polish Workers' Party." The PPR, intended in some sense as a continuation of the prewar KPP, was established in Warsaw on 5 January 1942, when some of the new arrivals met with local communist activists.

The new party, which presented itself as an anti-Nazi Polish patriotic front, distributed a manifesto printed in Moscow entitled To workers, peasants and intelligentsia! To all Polish patriots!, in which it called for an uncompromising struggle against the German occupier. A leftist, formally democratic program was proposed and the party, whose operations concentrated mostly in the General Government, grew to about six thousand members by the summer of 1942. From 1943, an affiliated youth organization existed; it was called the Union for the Struggle of the Youth (Związek Walki Młodych).

The PPR operated under the Central Committee led by Secretary Marceli Nowotko. Nowotko was killed on 28 November 1942. Mołojec took over as secretary (party chief), but he was suspected of arranging Nowotko's murder and subsequently condemned and executed by the ruling of the party court. In January 1943, Finder became secretary and the three-person Secretariat also included Władysław Gomułka and Franciszek Jóźwiak.

Gwardia Ludowa (the People's Guard) military organization originated together with the party it served. It was led by Mołojec and then Jóźwiak. Gwardia Ludowa attacked Germans in Warsaw and organized partisan units in the countryside, primarily to destroy the German communication facilities.

In February 1943 the PPR undertook talks with the Government Delegation for Poland, which represented in occupied Poland the Polish government-in-exile, and the central command of the underground Home Army, on possible cooperation. The negotiations made no progress because of the irreconcilable points of view of the two sides. After the Soviet Union broke diplomatic relations with the Polish government (25 April 1943), the contacts were terminated and the PPR's attitude toward the exile government-led Polish authority became hostile.

The war progressively radicalized Polish society and the communists tried to take advantage of the situation by forming a coalition with other leftist and agrarian forces. However, a common "democratic front", meant as a platform for the future power struggle, failed to materialize because the rival parties were generally unwilling to cooperate with the PPR.

== Polish communist institutions in the Soviet Union ==
Facilitated by Stalin, communist-controlled Polish civilian and military institutions were also formed in the Soviet Union. The leading roles in them were initially assumed by Wanda Wasilewska, a daughter of former Polish minister and Piłsudski's associate, herself a friend of Stalin, and the Polish officer Zygmunt Berling. From October 1940, Berling led a group of Polish officers working to establish a Polish division within the Soviet Red Army. The Union of Polish Patriots, proposed and organized from January 1943, had its founding congress in June 1943 and was led by Wasilewska. Berling, Alfred Lampe, Stefan Jędrychowski, Andrzej Witos and Bolesław Drobner were among the communists and individuals of other political orientations active in the organization, people willing to participate in a communist-dominated undertaking. After the Soviet authorities closed the branches of the Polish government's delegation in Soviet controlled territories, the union, assisted by a Soviet agency, established a social welfare department to look after the Poles scattered throughout its range of operations. The Polish 1st Tadeusz Kościuszko Infantry Division, commanded by Berling, was formed beginning in May 1943. The division fought at the Battle of Lenino in October 1943. The Polish National Committee, intended to develop into a communist government, was organized under Wasilewska from December 1943, but its formation was abandoned when Moscow found out about the existence of the State National Council in Warsaw. The Polish civilian and military activities in the Soviet Union were managed from January 1944 by the Central Bureau Communists of Poland. Its important members were Chairman Aleksander Zawadzki, Wasilewska, Karol Świerczewski, Jakub Berman, Stanisław Radkiewicz, Roman Zambrowski, Hilary Minc and Marian Spychalski. Some of them would later form the core of the Stalinist and strictly pro-Soviet (internationalist in outlook) faction of Poland's ruling communists, who worked closely with Bolesław Bierut and were opposed to the national PPR current led by Gomułka. On the military side, the First Polish Corps was formed from the Kościuszko Division and expanded into the First Polish Army in March 1944, still under command of General Berling. The army was incorporated into the 1st Belorussian Front.

== Gomułka's leadership, State National Council, Polish Committee of National Liberation ==
In November 1943 Finder and Fornalska were arrested by the Gestapo, which also took the PPR's radio equipment. Communication between Warsaw and Moscow was no longer possible. Władysław Gomułka became secretary of the Central Committee of the PPR on 23 November 1943 and Bierut became a member of the Secretariat.

The PPR published the "What are we fighting for" (O co walczymy) program declaration. Democratic ideas and future elections were proclaimed there, while the government-in-exile and the Underground State were denied the right to represent the Polish nation. Territorial changes after the war were indicated and nationalization of industry was promised together with land reform.

At that time the Central Committee decided to create the State National Council (Krajowa Rada Narodowa, KRN), a quasi-parliament rival to the government-in-exile and the Underground State institutions. The council was established on 1 January 1944 and was chaired by Bierut. Members of splinter socialist and peasant groups were co-opted to participate. The communist partisan military formation was now named Armia Ludowa (AL); it was placed under command of General Michał Rola-Żymierski.

After communications with Moscow were restored, a KRN delegation left for Moscow. Upon arriving there, they were officially greeted by Soviet officials and in June the Union of Polish Patriots had to recognize the KRN as the "true representation of the Polish nation". After the second KRN delegation arrived in Moscow, the Polish communists, in close cooperation with Stalin and other Soviet leaders, began working on a temporary executive government to administer the Polish lands (west of the Bug River) liberated by the Soviet and Polish communist armies. On 22 July 1944 the new organ, named the Polish Committee of National Liberation (PKWN), was officially established in the Lublin province. The PKWN Manifesto was issued, in which the committee claimed its authority in liberated Poland and announced fundamental and wide-ranging reconstruction and systemic changes, most prominently a land reform, to be implemented in the country. The socialist Edward Osóbka-Morawski was the PKWN's head and General Żymierski led the defense department, which diminished the role of General Berling. Most of the remaining PPR and KRN leaders left Warsaw and entered the Soviet-controlled territory. Zenon Kliszko and few others stayed in the capital to coordinate communist activities in the still occupied part of Poland.

== Government-in-exile after Sikorski's death ==
After the death of Prime Minister Sikorski, the important figures in the exile government in London were President Władysław Raczkiewicz, the newly nominated Prime Minister Stanisław Mikołajczyk and Commander-in-chief Kazimierz Sosnkowski. During the Tehran Conference (November–December 1943) Stalin, Franklin D. Roosevelt and Winston Churchill determined the geographic location of the future Polish state (between the Oder River and the Curzon Line) without consulting or even notifying the Polish leaders. Czechoslovakia, previously Poland's partner for a planned confederation, signed in December 1943 a friendship treaty with the Soviet Union. As a result of the developing Soviet wartime advantage, the Polish government was gradually abandoned by its allies.

Early in January 1944, the Soviet forces crossed the 1939 border of Poland. The British pressured the Polish government to accept the Soviet conditions for a resumption of Polish-Soviet diplomatic relations and practical cooperation (a recognition of the Curzon Line border and removal of anti-Soviet politicians from the Polish government), but the Polish side balked. Mikołajczyk advocated compromising with the Soviets for the sake of preserving the country's independence, while Sosnkowski, counting on the outbreak of war between the Allies, rejected making any concessions. In February Churchill publicly announced his government's support for a Curzon Line Polish-Soviet border anyway.

In June 1944, Mikołajczyk officially traveled to the United States, where President Roosevelt suggested that he visits the Soviet Union to conduct political discussions. Roosevelt also asked Stalin to invite the Polish prime minister for talks on a resumption of bilateral relations. On 30 July Mikołajczyk arrived in Moscow accompanied by Foreign Minister Tadeusz Romer and Stanisław Grabski, chairman of the National Council. The PKWN had already been established and Stalin proposed negotiations between the two Polish representations aimed at their unification. The talks with Bierut, Osóbka-Morawski and Wasilewska did take place, but Mikołajczyk found the communist ideas and demands unacceptable, even though he was offered the job of prime minister in a combined government. The PKWN leaders were willing to grant the pro-Western Poles only four out of the eighteen discussed ministerial seats. Mikołajczyk reported to the government delegate in Poland that the Soviets would consider establishing diplomatic relations if the Poles first agreed between themselves, that "the Soviet government has not yet finally sided with the (Polish) communists", but "Polish communists are determined to exploit the situation for turning Poland into a communist state". Thus the prime minister, himself unable to convince his government of the necessity of offering significant concessions to victorious communists, believed that Polish communist leaders were effectively blocking his deal with Stalin. After Mikołajczyk's return to London, the government-in-exile came up with its own version of compromise proposals which included the PPR's participation in the government, but they were rejected by the PKWN.

== Defeat of Operation Tempest and the Warsaw Uprising ==
In 1944, the lack of Polish-Soviet diplomatic relations and the resultant inability to conduct negotiations forced the Polish leadership to undertake political and military actions in an attempt to create a fait accompli situation in Poland that the Soviets would be compelled to accept. According to the planned Operation Tempest, the retreating German forces would be attacked by the Home Army, temporary Polish civilian administration would be installed in the liberated areas and its members, representing the government-in-exile, would greet the incoming Soviets as the rightful hosts. Consequently, in the spring and summer of 1944, the Polish underground waged numerous military operations in the areas where the Soviet advance was taking place. The actions resulted in military and political defeats, because the Soviets disarmed, arrested and deported the Home Army fighters, while the Western Allies cultivated good relations with the Soviet Union and were not interested in investigating the Polish claims of mistreatment or lending the Poles practical support. Fighting and winning a battle for Warsaw seemed the only opportunity left for the mainstream Polish independence movement.

The establishment of the PKWN provided an additional motivation for starting the Warsaw Uprising on 1 August 1944. The Soviets did not join the battle and stopped their offensive. The insurgents were being overpowered by the Germans and the belated rescue attempt in September by the 1st Infantry Division of Berling's First Polish Army ended in a bloody defeat. The Home Army capitulated on 2 October, Warsaw was subsequently largely demolished per Adolf Hitler's orders, and the Polish government-in-exile was no longer capable of staging major armed demonstrations in Poland. General Sosnkowski, having criticized the lack of effective aid to the Warsaw Uprising participants from the Allies, was removed from his top command position in September 1944.

== Mikołajczyk's resignation, Provisional Government ==
In October, Churchill and Anthony Eden went to Moscow, as did Mikołajczyk, Grabski and Romer. They negotiated again with Bierut, Osóbka-Morawski and Rola-Żymierski. Mikołajczyk resisted the British and Soviet pressure to accept the communist territorial and other demands. In November in London, the Polish government rejected the Curzon Line border again. President Roosevelt disappointed the Poles by designating the Polish, British and Soviet governments as the proper forum for border discussions, but Prime Minister Mikołajczyk, unable to convince his colleagues of the need for further compromises, resigned on 24 November 1944. The Polish government, now led by Tomasz Arciszewski, was no longer seriously considered by the Allies.

On 31 December 1944, the State National Council converted the PKWN to the Provisional Government of the Republic of Poland, with Osóbka-Morawski as the prime minister. The Soviet Union recognized the new institution and the Western Allies did not object. The KRN and the Provisional Government gradually strengthened their position, as the Soviet NKVD facilitated the process by performing large scale arrests of opponents of communist rule.

The Provisional Government signed a 20-year friendship, alliance and cooperation treaty with the Soviet Union on 21 April 1945.

== Communist-led war effort ==
The leftist, Soviet-allied Polish armed forces, placed under the authority of the PKWN and then the Provisional Government, were rapidly expanded, ultimately to about 400,000 people in two armies. In the summer of 1944, the First Polish Army established bridgeheads on the Vistula'a left bank south of Warsaw and in August its 1st Armoured Brigade fought the Germans at the Battle of Studzianki.

Many diversionary military actions and other combat operations were undertaken by Armia Ludowa and the Soviet partisans in September and October 1944, especially, but not only, in the Kielce province. At the end of October, led by the AL commander Mieczysław Moczar, most units broke through the front lines to the Soviet-Polish side.

The Soviet offensive was resumed on 12 January 1945. On 17 January the First Polish Army led by General Stanisław Popławski entered the destroyed Warsaw. It fought on the 1st Belorussian Front and during the following month participated in overcoming strongly fortified German defenses at the Pomeranian Wall, losing 6,500 soldiers; in March it took Kolberg. The 1st Armoured Brigade fought within the 2nd Belorussian Front and contributed to the liberation of Gdańsk and Gdynia. The First Army forced its way across the Oder River on 16–17 April and reached the Elbe near Spandau on 3 May. Its 1st Tadeusz Kościuszko Infantry Division and other Polish formations participated in the final Battle of Berlin. The Second Polish Army, led by General Karol Świerczewski, operated with the 1st Ukrainian Front. It crossed the Lusatian Neisse on 16 April and heading for Dresden suffered heavy losses at the Battle of Bautzen, due to poor command. However, a German rescue force heading for Berlin was stopped. Helping to defeat Nazi Germany in Poland, the two Polish armies suffered losses equal to the Polish military losses encountered during the September Campaign of 1939—66,000 soldiers killed (according to Antoni Czubiński).

== Provisional Government of National Unity ==
The Polish social Left was critical with respect to the prewar Sanation-ruled Second Polish Republic and called for the establishment of a more just and democratic post-war Poland. A return to the March Constitution of 1921 was advocated. These postulates and the Soviet demand for Poland's eastern Kresy territories were accepted by the PPR and allied Polish Socialist Party (PPS) leaders, with considerable support from the agrarian movement politicians, who were also opposed to the April Constitution (1935) regime. Leftist sentiments, increasingly prevalent in Poland in 1944 and 1945, mixed with the widespread unease and fear regarding Poland's expected domination by the Soviet Union.

Further determinations regarding the future of Poland were made at the Yalta Conference in February 1945. The United States and Britain accepted the Soviet position in respect to postwar borders (the extent of Poland's western expansion at the expense of Germany was not specified), but differed with the Soviets on the issue of participation of the London-based government-in-exile in the formation of Poland's new compromise government. The Allied leaders ultimately authorized converting the existing in Poland, communist-dominated Provisional Government to Provisional Government of National Unity (TRJN), with greater participation of democratic and pro-Western forces, but no formal role for the government-in-exile. The TRJN was charged with conducting free elections soon, based on which a permanent Polish government would be established. As for the practical implementation, a commission representing the three great powers negotiated the issue of the TRJN in Moscow and the talks had been stalled for a long time, until joined by former Prime Minister Mikołajczyk of the government-in-exile. In June Mikołajczyk agreed to a temporary deal, which turned out to permanently favor the communist side.

The exact shape of the TRJN was determined during talks in Moscow on 16–21 June 1945. The KRN and the Provisional Government were represented there by seven politicians, including Bierut and Gomułka, three representatives, including Mikołajczyk, came from the emigrant circles and there were five non-communists from Poland. Mikołajczyk unsuccessfully tried to limit the dominant role of the communists and became only a deputy prime minister. Mikołajczyk's People's Party was granted the right to nominate ⅓ of the KRN members; Wincenty Witos and Stanisław Grabski were the new vice-chairmen of that body. On 28 June 1945, Chairman Bierut of the KRN created the TRJN, and on 5 July the US and the United Kingdom withdrew their recognition of the government-in-exile.

The TRJN was led by the socialist Prime Minister Osóbka-Morawski of the previous Provisional Government. Gomułka and Mikołajczyk were included as deputy prime ministers. The formally coalition government had seven PPR members, six from the peasant People's Party and Polish Socialist Party each, and two from the centrist Democratic Alliance (SD). The government was controlled by the PPR and other politicians reconciled to the reality of Soviet domination. Mikołajczyk's party however, aware of its popularity, counted on winning the planned parliamentary elections and was the only participant that actually thought of the TRJN as being temporary.

== Formation of a new sociopolitical system, PPR's role and program ==
Operating within the Soviet-controlled international environment, regardless of the results of the upcoming mandated elections, the Polish communists had no intention of giving up political power and made no secret of it. Nonetheless, many of them believed that the reforms they undertook under the evolving new system would remain popular and would enable them to win future elections.

The PPR invoked the tradition of social struggle in the Second Polish Republic and the party gained support of many politicians of leftist orientation from the peasant and socialist movements, who shared that point of view. The PPR promised radical land ownership and agrarian reforms as well as nationalization of the industry, banking and trade. The communists used nationalistic rhetoric of the prewar National Democracy movement in regard to the post-German "Recovered Territories".

A "Democratic Bloc" of parties was organized around the PPR; it included pro-communist factions of the socialist, agrarian and centrist movements. Mikołajczyk's Polish People's Party was legalized and functioned independently as the only formal opposition; other political formations were banned and their supporters persecuted.

The PPR itself comprised different factions, reflecting different experiences of its members. Some of the PPR leaders referred to the Communist International tradition and proclaimed internationalist ideas. They believed in strict hegemony of the Soviet Union, which they saw as both necessary and desirable. PPR chief Władysław Gomułka led the faction that also believed in the (politically necessary) Polish-Soviet alliance, but wanted to form it on more pragmatic bases. They stressed the Polish national interest and wished to pursue a more limited cooperation, as conditioned by that interest. All PPR factions were actually strongly dependent on and therefore practically dominated by Stalin's regime.

In a broader historical perspective, the cooperation of Polish communists, other leftists and some non-leftist politicians with Stalin prevented a territorial reduction of the Polish state of great magnitude. In geopolitical reality, such reduction would be irreversible.

== Incorporation of post-German territories, postwar reconstruction and state socialist reforms ==
Poland's eastern borders had not become a major international issue, as the Western powers accepted the Soviet position in this regard. Decisions concerning the Polish–German border were made at the Potsdam Conference, where Stalin lobbied for Poland's maximal extension in the west, arranged for the Polish government delegation to present their point of view and in the end thwarted the long-standing British policy (aimed at keeping some of the lands in question for the future German state). In Poland, the PPR led the massive "Recovered Territories" propaganda campaign, the Allied-authorized expulsion of ethnic Germans and the repopulation of the region by Poles "repatriated" from the lost Kresy eastern areas. The exact eastern boundary was determined in the Polish–Soviet treaty signed on 16 August 1945, which finalized the contested issue of Lviv (the city stayed on the Soviet Ukrainian side of the border). The resettlement of Ukrainians who lived on the Polish side followed.

The settlement and development of post-German lands was considered a high priority and the Ministry of the Recovered Territories, established in November 1945, was led by Gomułka himself. Being convinced of the crucial importance of the acquired areas for Poland, he energetically pursued their economic development and integration with the rest of the country. After the war, Polish officials had to engage in complicated bargaining with the Soviet authorities, who considered industrial installations in former Germany their war loot and wanted to take as much of it as possible to the Soviet Union.

The land reform decree was issued by the PKWN on 6 September 1944. Over one million peasant families benefited from the parcellation of larger estates and post-German property (6 million hectares of land). The act and its implementation concluded the various land reform attempts and partial realizations that went back to the partitioned Poland and Second Polish Republic periods. Thousands of State Agricultural Farms were also established (1.5 million hectares). They were intended as model farming enterprises, demonstrating, in addition to their role in food production, the progressive ways of agriculture. The reforms, whose consequences fundamentally altered the antiquated social and economic structure of Polish society, were sharply criticized by advocates of the inviolability of property rights. Existence as a social class of ziemiaństwo (large scale land owners) was undercut, while the free market economic system was for the most part still functioning in the country.

Reforms of more moderate nature were undertaken in regard to private industry. Various, sometimes chaotic developments took place in 1944–45, including the taking over of thousands of enterprises by workers' councils. A charged national debate that followed resulted in the KRN statute of 3 January 1946. It was decided that the state would take over enterprises that employed over 50 people on a given shift, but the owners who were Polish or foreign (not German) would be paid compensation. Based on that statute, 5,870 enterprises were nationalized by 1948, while 15,700 were left in private hands.

Central planning got started with the establishment of the Central Planning Office in November 1945, directed by socialist Czesław Bobrowski. The Economic Committee of the Council of Ministers was led by Hilary Minc. The economic reconstruction of Poland was undertaken, combined with prospective planning for the next 12 years. 230,000 residential apartments were built in the cities and 300,000 in the country in 1945–47, which resulted in more evenly spread population, living under considerably improved conditions.

Compulsory general education was brought back and higher education was tuition free. A shortage of teachers had to be addressed first and many were needed, given the massive program of elimination of illiteracy and part-time evening schooling for the employed. The United Nations Relief and Rehabilitation Administration (UNRRA) helped with food, clothes and equipment for the Polish people (the assistance amounted to 22% of the country's national income in 1946). Inflation went up to 38% in 1947, but was brought down to 4% in 1949. In late 1946 Poland's economy approached the 1938 prewar level, which allowed gradual discontinuation of the previously imposed rationing of mass consumption products.

Legislation concerning the Three-Year Plan (1947–49) for economic development was passed by the KRN in 1946 and again in 1947 by the new "Legislative Sejm" (parliament) that replaced the KRN after the 1947 Polish legislative election. In 1947, the Sejm proclaimed the right to work. Unemployment was eliminated and real wages increased by 58% during the plan years, but still lagged behind their 1938 level. The public sector produced 50% of the national income in 1947, which went up to 64% in 1949. The private sector was being reduced, while the network of cooperative enterprises experienced significant growth in the area of trade.

== Political struggle and persecution of opposition ==
Politicians in Poland connected in the past to the Sanation and National Democracy formations did not recognize the new realities and waged a determined campaign against the communist authorities, boycotting decisions of the government, especially the ones having to do with the establishment of administrative and military structures. This led to conflicts and intensified repressions. Polish internal security organs were created and resolved, in cooperation with their Soviet counterparts, to disable the opposition using persecution and terror. The political confrontations were accompanied by armed activity of anti-government conspiracy groups.

The Polish Catholic Church, led by Cardinal August Hlond until his death in 1948, took an anti-regime stand. It coped with difficulties related to the lack of Polish church organization in the Recovered Territories. In the fall of 1945, with permission from the Vatican, the Church embarked on the establishment of provisional administrative structures in the territories taken from Germany. Authorization for permanent Polish church administration there was not forthcoming and the instability in this area added to the existing German-Polish antagonisms.

In April 1946, a new volunteer citizen militia ORMO was formed to help the police (Milicja Obywatelska), political police (UBP), the Internal Security Corps, the Polish army, the Soviet political police (NKVD), and the Soviet army to eliminate armed opposition to the government. The NKVD killed, arrested, harassed, and used propaganda to suppress and discredit opponents of the regime. Already during the 1944–48 period, many were imprisoned or taken to the Soviet Union, some executed under court rulings. The whole security system was directed by Soviet politician Lavrentiy Beria.

On May 23, 1946, the Central Committee of the Polish Workers' Party passed a resolution to establish the Department of Party History at the Central Committee. Its goal was pro-communist propaganda and slandering independence movements. The resolution provided for the creation of 4 positions for political and scientific workers. The same resolution appointed Regina Kaplan-Kobrynska as the first head of the department.

Government authorities offered two amnesties for fighters from the opposition militia groups, which originated from remnants of the disbanded Home Army and other organizations. Tens of thousands of oppositionists took advantage of the amnesties declared in 1945 and 1947. Some were subjected to further prosecution and imprisonment, but the amnesties effectively terminated the anti-communist armed resistance movement.

== Elections of 1947 and elimination of legal opposition ==
The replacement of postwar cooperation among the great powers with the Cold War derailed the planned peace conference—the issue of Poland's western border was not going to be amicably resolved. In the West only France clearly upheld its support for Poland in the border dispute. "Revisionist" circles had a prominent voice in what was becoming West Germany and the PPR, for existential reasons, felt compelled to strengthen its policy of reliance on the Soviet Union. The TRJN was now in no position to maneuver any degree of independence for itself.

The PPR delayed nationwide parliamentary elections because it believed that the ongoing implementation of reforms would move the public opinion in its favor. The party strengthened its position by first holding a referendum in June 1946, intended as a plebiscite for or against the new system. For the election, the PPR-dominated Democratic Bloc prepared a unified list of candidates; the Polish Socialist Party agreed to join the bloc, but the Polish People's Party, led by Mikołajczyk, refused. The bloc was also opposed by other groups, some of which were not legally registered, while other were semi- or fully conspiratorial and hostile to the bloc.

The referendum asked three questions: about abolishing the Senate (parliament's upper chamber), future constitutional moderate socialist reforms, and the permanency of Poland's western and northern borders. The ruling regime needed to show an overwhelming support for its program before the elections. Accordingly, the referendum was conducted under considerable pressure (such as heavy military and police presence) and the results were falsified to give the Democratic Bloc a strong majority it wanted.

The PPR and its allies in the bloc were large parties, each with membership in hundreds of thousands, supported in addition by the several million-strong trade union structure. They had public security forces at their disposal. The also large and popular People's Party invoked Poland's Western connections and its tradition of struggles for independence. It was supported by the Catholic clergy. The campaign was harsh and the PPR was often subjected to antisemitic Żydokomuna accusations. Given the Soviet pressure, the bloc could not just have won elections by receiving a majority of the votes; it had to produce a result impressive enough for propaganda purposes.

The communists feared losing the elections to Mikołajczyk's party and that this outcome would cause a complete Soviet occupation of Poland. During the election campaign, the PPR targeted the People's Party, the Democratic Bloc's main (but not only) election rival, arresting its candidates, harassing them, and denying them public exposure. About one hundred opposition party activists were murdered; many PPR members were also killed.

In the 1947 Polish legislative election the bloc claimed to have won 80% of the votes, but the election was widely seen as fraudulent. Factors such as the scale of the fraud or who actually received the largest number of votes are not known. The campaign and election results eliminated the People's Party from the political scene, which left Poland with no legally functioning opposition. Mikołajczyk, harassed and threatened, fled the country in October 1947.

== Removal of Gomułka, Stalinism, Polish United Workers' Party ==
In accordance with the announced election results, the PPS, which competed within the Democratic Bloc, received two more legislative mandates than the PPR. The Presidency of Poland was reestablished by the Sejm and Bolesław Bierut, previously chairman of the KRN, was given that job. Józef Cyrankiewicz, a socialist, became the new prime minister and Gomułka was kept as deputy prime minister. The intermediate Small Constitution of 1947 was passed by the Sejm. The newly created Council of State had emergency powers and was led by the president. Despite the elections conducted under communist control and amnesty for armed and political opponents declared by the Sejm, the situation in Poland underwent further polarization.

Because of the deepening division in international politics and the emergence of two mutually hostile blocs, Stalin demanded stricter loyalty in the Soviet sphere; purges of circles and individuals considered ideologically corrupt or otherwise unreliable were pursued. Gomułka's criticism of Soviet policies was now seen as inappropriately nationalistic. Gomułka's "Polish road to socialism", adapting to conditions specific to Poland, was no longer tolerated as Stalin tightened his control over the PPR. Gomułka and his group were removed from positions of responsibility and in August 1948 the Central Committee installed Bierut as general secretary of the PPR. Bierut would strictly follow the Soviet lead and remold Polish society on the Stalinist model.

The PPR pressured the remaining left-wing faction of the Polish Socialist Party (PPS) to merge the two parties. The merger occurred in December 1948 and the Polish United Workers' Party (Polska Zjednoczona Partia Robotnicza, PZPR) was formed. The merger was conducted almost entirely on PPR terms; the PPS had by then been "purified" with the expulsion of hundreds of its members.

The Polish People's Party managed to survive for another year, albeit under growing harassment. In 1949, its remains merged with a pro-communist splinter party to form the United People's Party (Zjednoczone Stronnictwo Ludowe, ZSL).

Under PPR rule, the Republic of Poland was a declared "people's democracy" and was not officially considered a socialist entity. Private property and free market functionality were tolerated and the role of the state was not overly exposed. All this had changed with the establishment of the PZPR: the Six-Year Plan of heavy industrial development was imposed and the building of state socialist system and society commenced in earnest.

== Election results ==
=== Sejm ===
Year	Popular vote	% of vote	Seats
1947	9,003,682	80.07 (#1)	114 / 444
1947	As part of the Democratic Bloc coalition, which won 394 seats in total.		

== See also ==
- List of Polish Workers' Party politicians
