= Medal for Warsaw 1939–1945 =

Polish award

Medal for Warsaw 1939–1945 Medal za Warszawę 1939–1945
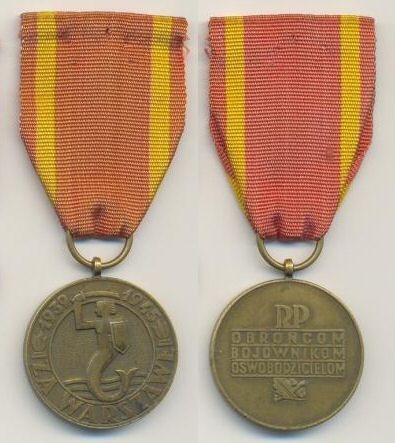
- Type: Commemorative Medal
- Awarded for: Participation in the Defense of Warsaw in September 1939, Warsaw Uprising of 1944 and in the liberation of the city in January 1945
- Presented by: Poland
- Eligibility: Polish or foreign civilian and military personnel
- Status: No longer awarded
- Established: November 21, 1945
- First award: 1946
- Final award: May 8, 1999

Highlights
- Total: 135,837
- Ribbon bar of the Medal for Warsaw 1939–1945

The Medal for Warsaw 1939–1945 (Polish: Medal za Warszawę 1939–1945) was a Polish commemorative medal awarded by the Polish People's Republic to commemorate active participation in defending Warsaw in 1939, 1944 Warsaw Uprising, and in liberation of Warsaw from Nazi Germany in January 1945.

== History ==
The Medal for Warsaw 1939–1945 was established by a decree of the Council of Ministers of November 21, 1945:

"In order to commemorate the heroic history of Warsaw in the war with the Nazi invaders, the history of a soldier who defended the Capital in September 1939, fought relentlessly during the occupation and died sacrificially in the tragic uprising, as well as to commemorate the victorious liberation of Warsaw by the Polish People's Army in alliance with the Red Army and to reward the participants of these fights for the Capital."

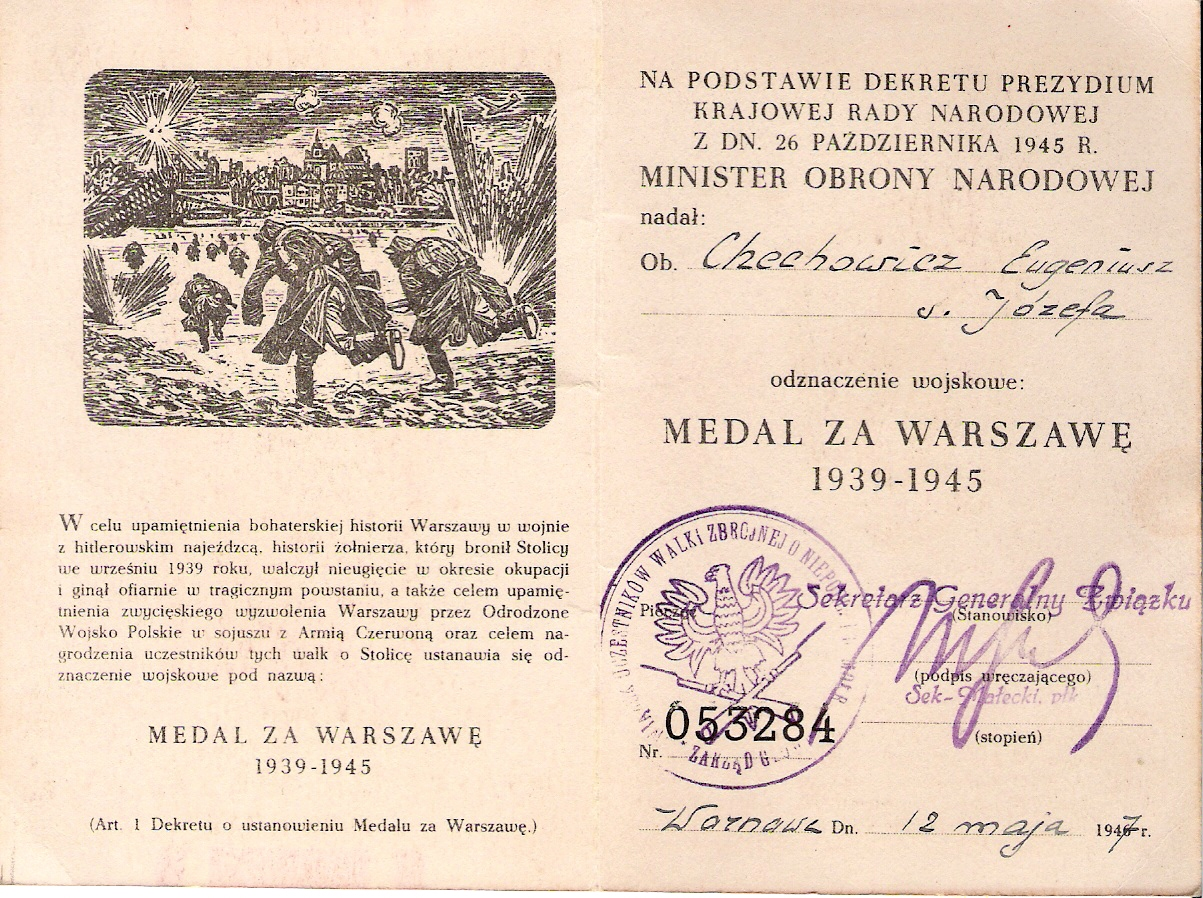
Card confirming the award of the Medal for Warsaw 1939–1945

One of the first people to be awarded the medal was the first President of Poland Bolesław Bierut and Władysław Gomułka, and some high-ranking members of the Polish military such as Michał Rola-Żymierski and Stanislav Poplavsky. For political reasons, most members of the Home Army were not awarded this medal. Pursuant to the decree, the Ministry of National Defense appointed a commission which oversaw the right to be awarded the medal. In 1946, the ministry handed over the right to award the medal to the commanders of military districts, commanders of the 1st Tadeusz Kościuszko Infantry Division, 2nd Warsaw Infantry Division, 3rd Pomeranian Infantry Division, 4th Pomeranian Infantry Division and 6th Pomeranian Infantry Division. The right to award the medal was also given to the commander of the 1st Warsaw Cavalry Division and the General Board of the Society of Fighters for Freedom and Democracy.

The medal was later included in the Polish system of decorations by the Law of February 17, 1960 on Orders and Decorations. From 1958, the right to award the medal was granted to the State National Council, after 1989 to the President of the Polish People's Republic, and from January 1, 1990 to the President of the Republic of Poland.

Until 1989, a total of 131,242 awards were awarded, and in the years 1993–1999 was awarded to another 4,476 people. A total of 135,837 people were awarded this medal. By the Act of October 16, 1992, the awarding of the medal was deemed completed on May 8, 1999.

== Appearance ==
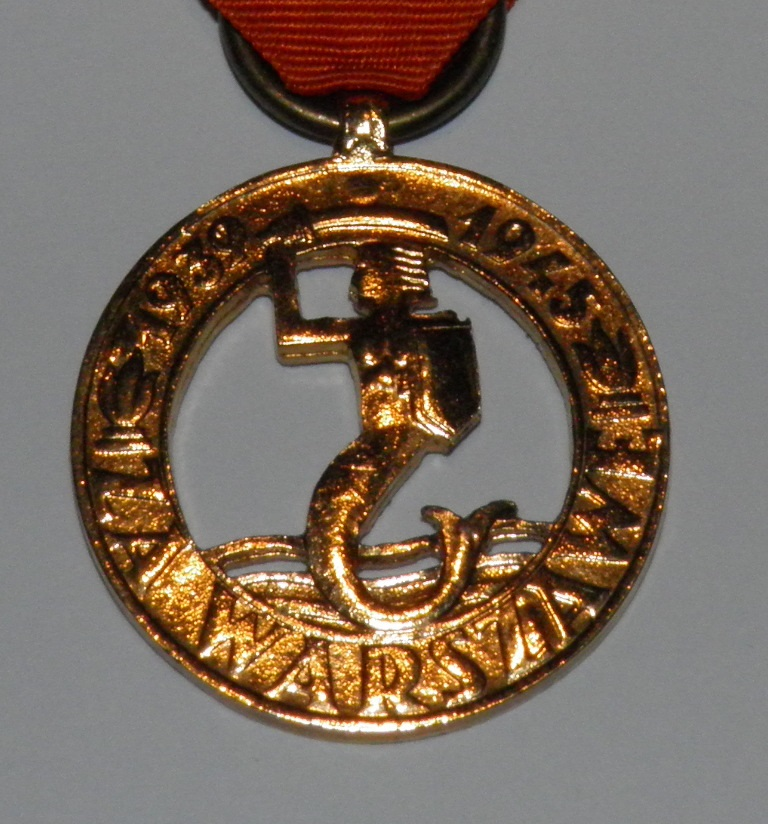
First version of the medal

The Medal for Warsaw 1939–1945 was designed by Polish artists Stanisław Łoza and Stanisław Gepner.

The bronze medal is round with a diameter of 33 mm. On the front there is an image of a Siren with a shield in the left hand and a sword in the right hand. These represent the coat of arms of Warsaw. On the top there is the inscription "1939" and "1945", which are start and end years of World War II. On the bottom consists of Polish inscription "ZA WARSZAWE" ('For Warsaw'). On the obverse can consists of the Polish words "RP-OBRONCOM-BOJOWNIKOM-OSWOBODZICIELOM" ('RP', 'To the defenders', 'Warriors', 'Liberators'), together with oak leaves and three acorns. All inscriptions and images on the medal are convex.

The ribbon is red with two longitudinal bands along the sides that represent the colours of Warsaw.

== See also ==
- Medal "For the Liberation of Warsaw"
