= Marceli Nowotko =

Polish communist activist

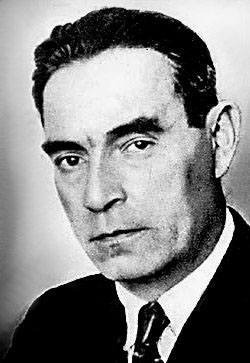
- Born: Marceli Nowotka; 8 July 1893; Warsaw, Congress Poland
- Died: 28 November 1942 (aged 49); Warsaw, General Government
- Cause of death: Executed
- Body discovered: Near Warsaw West
- Resting place: Powązki cemetery
- Occupation: Locksmith
- Era: 20th century
- Title: Secretary of the PPR
- Term: January–July 1942
- Successor: Bolesław Mołojec
- Political party: PPR
- Other political affiliations: SDKPiL; KPP; KPZU
- Movement: Communism
- Criminal charges: Engaging in communist activities
- Criminal penalty: Imprisoned in Pawiak and Mokotów (1929–1933), and Rawicz prison (1936–1939)
- Criminal status: Escaped
- Parents: Mateusz (father); Franciszka née Stecka (mother)
- Armed struggle
- Nicknames: Marian; Stary
- Allegiance: Third International
- Branch: TKRP; People's Guard
- Service years: 1919–1921; 1942
- Wars: Polish–Soviet War; World War II
- Awards: Order of the Cross of Grunwald

Marceli Nowotko (real surname: Nowotka) (Polish pronunciation: [marˈt͡sɛli nɔˈvɔtkɔ]; pseudonyms: Marian, Stary; 8 July 1893, Warsaw – 28 November 1942, Warsaw) was a Polish communist activist and first secretary of the Polish Workers Party (PPR).

== Life and career ==
Nowotko was born into a large family of farm workers. He was a self-educated locksmith. He was a member of the Social Democracy of the Kingdom of Poland and Lithuania from 1916 and the Communist Party of Poland from 1918. He organised a soviet communist agency in Ciechanów in 1918 and was a member of the soviet intelligence in Łapy during the Polish-Soviet War of 1920.

He was a middle-ranking Communist Party of Poland (KPP) functionary between the wars, serving as a local party organiser and on the agriculture section of the central committee. From 1923, he was a member of the central committee of the Communist Party of Western Ukraine.

He fled from Rawicz prison to Soviet-occupied eastern Poland in September 1939 and once politically rehabilitated (he had for a time been regarded by the NKVD as a "provocateur" in the KPP leadership), he served in the Soviet local administration in the Białystok area of the Byelorussian Soviet Socialist Republic as head of the soviet in Łapy.

Following the German invasion of the USSR in 1941, he was assigned to the "Initiative Group" parachuted into Poland in December 1941 to establish the Polish Workers Party (PPR). He headed the leadership troika with Bolesław Mołojec and Paweł Finder. The efforts to re-group the Polish communist movement achieved little and by autumn 1942 the organisation was under severe pressure from the Gestapo.

== Death of Nowotko ==
Nowotko was killed on 28 November 1942 in mysterious circumstances, a cause célèbre in Polish communist history that has never been fully explained. His body was found in a street near Warsaw West Station with bullet wounds. The last person to be seen with Nowotko was Mołojec, who claimed that they had been attacked by unknown assailants and that he (Mołojec) had fled the scene. Mołojec took control of the party leadership and communications with Moscow. Finder, Małgorzata Fornalska, Władysław Gomułka and Franciszek Jóźwiak, the other party leaders, regarded this as a usurpation and suspected that Mołojec had been responsible for Nowotko's murder. A planned attempt to kill Mołojec at a central committee meeting in mid-December had to be abandoned, after which Fornalska took charge of the arrangements for his assassination. It appears that Mołojec was executed by Jan Krasicki, probably in the Old Town of Warsaw at the end of December 1942. The new leadership of the PPR under Finder informed Moscow that Mołojec had ordered the killing of Nowotko, which was carried out by his brother, Zbigniew Mołojec.

The available evidence appears to support the claim that Mołojec was responsible for Nowotko's murder, but his motivation is unknown. Various explanations have been suggested: a power struggle in the PPR leadership resulting from Mołojec's personal ambitions or differences over strategy; mutual rivalries arising from factional struggles and the purge of the KPP in the late 1930s; and conflicting or misunderstood signals from the various Soviet agencies handling the PPR. Another theory is that execution was carried out by Home Army soldiers from Kedyw because of Nowotko's supposed collaboration with the Gestapo.

== See also ==
- History of Poland (1939–1945)
- History of Poland (1945–1989)
