= Edward Osóbka-Morawski =

Polish activist and politician (1909–1997)

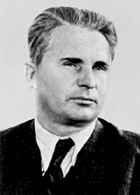
- Osóbka-Morawski in 1941

Prime Minister of Poland
- In office 31 December 1944 – 5 February 1947
- President: Bolesław Bierut
- Deputy: Stanisław Janusz; Władysław Gomułka; Stanisław Mikołajczyk
- Preceded by: Felicjan Sławoj Składkowski (As Prime Minister of the Second Polish Republic); Tomasz Arciszewski (As Prime Minister in exile)
- Succeeded by: Józef Cyrankiewicz

Personal details
- Born: 5 October 1909 Bliżyn, Congress Poland, Russian Empire
- Died: 9 January 1997 (aged 87) Warsaw, Poland
- Party: Polish Socialist Party (before 1948); Polish United Workers' Party (1948–1949, 1956–1990)

Edward Bolesław Osóbka-Morawski ['edvart ɔˈsupka mɔˈrafskʲi] (5 October 1909 – 9 January 1997) was a Polish activist and politician in the Polish Socialist Party (PPS) before World War II, and after the Soviet takeover of Poland, Chairman of the Communist-dominated interim government, the Polish Committee of National Liberation (Polski Komitet Wyzwolenia Narodowego) formed in Lublin with Stalin's approval.

In October 1944, Osóbka-Morawski was given the role of Minister of Foreign Affairs and Agriculture. Several months later, in June 1945, he was appointed Prime Minister of the Provisional Government of National Unity (Tymczasowy Rząd Jedności Narodowej), in office until February 1947. Osóbka-Morawski believed the PPS should join with the other non-communist party in Poland, the Polish Peasant Party, to form a united front against the Communist Polish Workers' Party. However, another prominent socialist, Józef Cyrankiewicz argued that the PPS should support the communists while opposing the creation of a one-party state. The Communists, with Soviet support, played on this division and forced Osóbka-Morawski to resign in favour of Cyrankiewicz.

Osóbka-Morawski would make his peace with the Communists, and gradually became a Stalinist. Nonetheless, in 1949 he was dismissed from his new post as the Minister of Public Administration, for "deviationist" tendencies. He was readmitted to the Communist Party, now called the Polish United Workers' Party, during the Polish October revolution of 1956. He then worked as a party official throughout most of his life in the People's Republic of Poland prior to the Revolutions of 1989, and in 1990 failed in his attempt to recreate the old Polish Socialist Party. He died in Warsaw in 1997.

== Awards and decorations ==
- Grand Cross of Order of Polonia Restituta (19 July 1946)
- Order of the Cross of Grunwald, 3rd Class (30 April 1944)
- Partisan Cross (12 June 1946)
- Medal for Warsaw 1939–1945
- Medal of Victory and Freedom 1945
- Grand Cross of Order of the White Lion (Czechoslovakia, 1947)
- Order of People's Liberation (Yugoslavia, 1946)

== See also ==
- Stalinism in Poland
- Socialist realism in Poland

== Notes and references ==
Political offices
Preceded by Tomasz Arciszewski (Prime Minister of the Polish Republic in Exile)	Prime Minister of Poland; 1944–1947	Succeeded by Józef Cyrankiewicz
