= 1947 Polish parliamentary election =

- 17 January 1947

All 444 seats in the Sejm
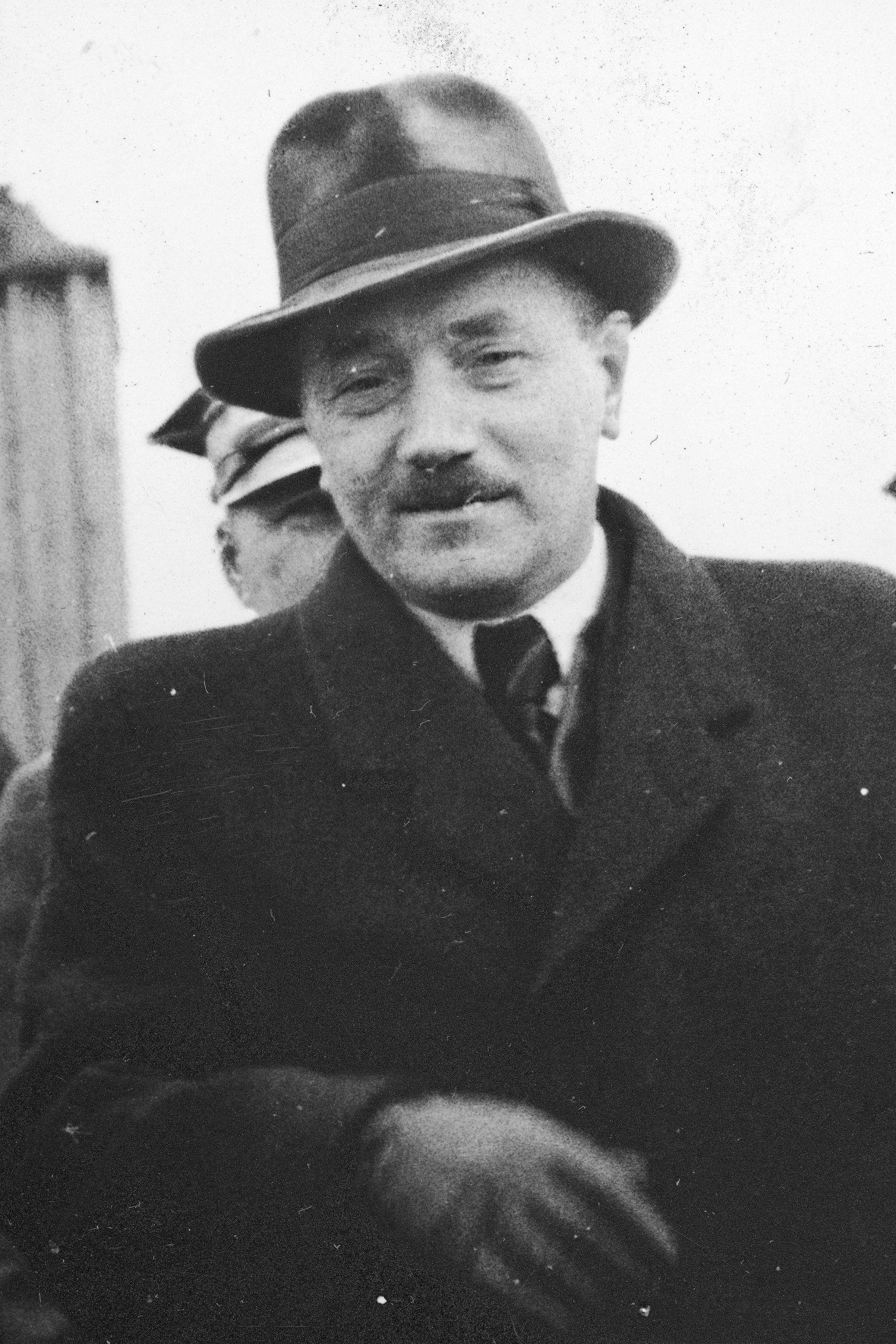

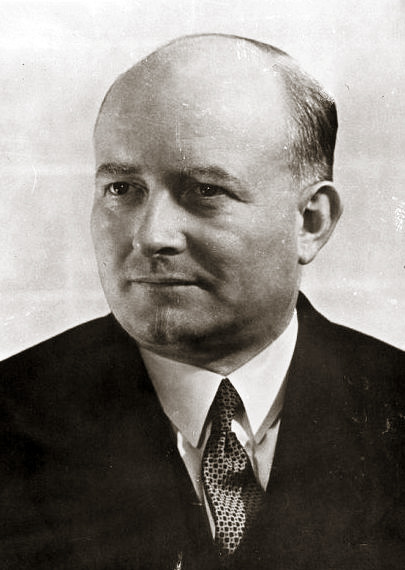

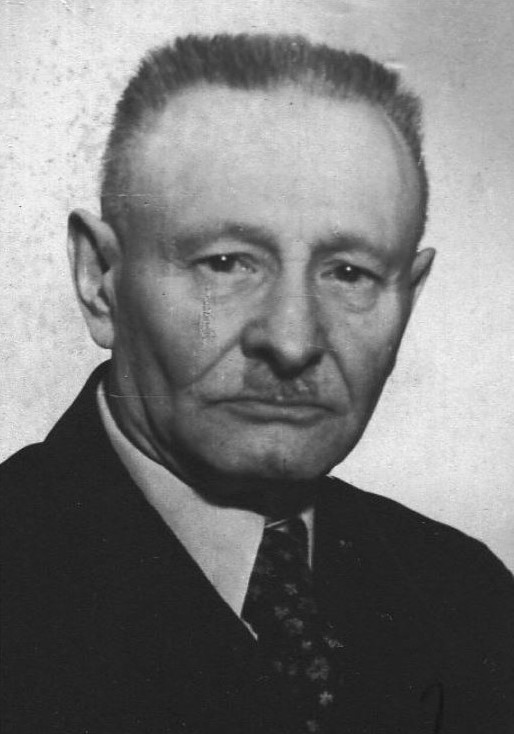
	Majority party	Minority party
Leader	Bolesław Bierut	Stanisław Mikołajczyk
Party	Democratic Bloc	PSL
Seats won	394	28
Popular vote	9,003,682	1,154,847
Percentage	80.07%	10.27%
	Third party	Fourth party
Leader	Tadeusz Michejda	Bronisław Drzewiecki
Party	SP	PSL "NW"
Seats won	12	7
Popular vote	530,979	397,754
Percentage	4.72%	3.54%
Premier before election
Edward Osóbka-Morawski
PPS
Premier
Józef Cyrankiewicz
PPS

Parliamentary elections were held in Poland on 19 January 1947, the first since World War II. According to the official results, the Democratic Bloc (Blok Demokratyczny), dominated by the Polish Workers' Party (PPR) and also including the Polish Socialist Party (PPS), People's Party (SL), Democratic Party (SD), and non-partisan candidates officially received 80% of the vote and 394 of the 444 seats in the Legislative Sejm. The largest opposition party, the Polish People's Party, was officially credited with 28 seats; however, the elections were characterized by violence; anti-Communist opposition candidates and activists were persecuted by the Volunteer Reserve Militia (ORMO).

The elections were heavily manipulated, and the opposition claimed that it would have won in a landslide had the election been conducted in a fair manner. The election gave the Soviets, as well as the Communist-dominated Polish satellite government, enough legitimacy to claim that Poland was "free and democratic", thus allowing Poland to sign the charter of the United Nations.

== Background ==
By 1946, Poland was mostly under the control of the Soviet Union and its proxies, the PPR. In 1946, the Communists already tested their strength by falsifying the "3xYES Referendum", and banning the vast majority of right-wing parties (under the pretext of their pro-Nazi stance). By 1947, the only remaining legal opposition was the Polish People's Party (PSL) of Stanisław Mikołajczyk.

The Yalta agreement called for "free and unfettered" elections in Poland. However, the Kremlin and the PPR had no intention of permitting an honest election. Soviet leader Joseph Stalin was well aware that if Poland held a free election, it would result in an anti-Soviet government. Conditioned in part by the Hungarian Communists' weak showing in 1945, the PPR proposed to present voters with a single list from all of the legal parties in the country. The PSL rejected this proposal almost out of hand. Eventually, only the PPS, SD and SL joined the Democratic Bloc. Every electoral district had Democratic Bloc's candidates on List 3.

The January 1947 elections held under the supervision of the PPR fell well short of being "free and unfettered". The PPR, under the leadership of general secretary Władysław Gomułka, embarked on a ruthless campaign to snuff out the PSL and all other potential opposition. Electoral laws introduced before the elections allowed the government – which since its establishment in 1944 by the Polish Committee of National Liberation had been dominated by the Communists – to remove 409,326 people from the electoral rolls, as "anti-government bandits" (i.e. the Home Army and other Polish resistance movements loyal to the Polish government in exile). Over 80,000 members of the Polish People's Party were arrested under various false charges in the month preceding the election, and around 100 of them were murdered by the Polish Secret Police (Urząd Bezpieczeństwa, UB). 98 opposition parliamentary candidates were also crossed from the registration lists under these accusations. In some regions the government disqualified the entire People's Party list under various technical and legal pretenses, most commonly in regions known to be People's Party strongholds.

The electoral fraud was organized and closely monitored by UB specialists, who worked closely with their Soviet counterparts like Aron Palkin and Semyon Davydov, both high-ranking officers from the Soviet MGB. Bolesław Bierut, head of the provisional Polish parliament (State National Council) and acting president, asked for Soviet assistance in the election. Over 40% of the members of the electoral commissions who were supposed to monitor the voting were recruited by the UB.

== Conduct ==
Opposition candidates and activists were persecuted until election day; only the PPR and its allies were allowed to campaign unhindered. The publicized results were falsified, with the official results known to selected government officials long before the actual elections took place and any votes were counted.

The real results were not known to anyone. In areas where the government had sufficient control, some of the ballot boxes were simply destroyed without being counted, or exchanged with boxes filled with prepared votes. Where possible, government officials simply filled in the numbers in the relevant documents as per instructions from Soviet and PPR officials without bothering to count the real votes.

A Time article covering the elections noted in its lead paragraph: "In a spirit of partisan exuberance tempered with terror, Poland approached its first nationwide popular election, ten days hence. By last week most of the combined opposition (Socialist and Polish Peasant Party) candidates had been jailed, and their supporters more or less completely cowed by the secret police, by striking their names from voting lists and by arrest. The Communist-dominated Government ventured to predict an 'overwhelming' victory." Historian Piotr Wrobel wrote that this election saw "the highest level of repression and terror" that was ever seen during the four decades of Communist rule in Poland.

== Results ==
Party or alliance		Votes	%	Seats
Democratic Bloc	Polish Socialist Party	9,003,682	80.07	116
Democratic Bloc	Polish Workers' Party	9,003,682	80.07	114
Democratic Bloc	People’s Party	9,003,682	80.07	109
Democratic Bloc	Alliance of Democrats	9,003,682	80.07	41
Democratic Bloc	Independents	9,003,682	80.07	14
Polish People's Party		1,154,847	10.27	28
Labour Faction		530,979	4.72	12
Polish People’s Party "New Liberation"		397,754	3.54	7
Independents		157,611	1.40	3
Total		11,244,873	100.00	444
Valid votes		11,244,873	99.15	
Invalid votes		96,610	0.85	
Total votes		11,341,483	100.00	
Registered voters/turnout		12,701,058	89.30	
Source: , Nohlen & Stöver

In his post-election report to Stalin, Pałkin estimated that the real results (i.e. votes cast) gave the Democratic Bloc about 50% of the vote. The opposition contended that it had the support of 63 percent of the voting population, and would have received about 80% of the votes, had the elections been free and fair. The only official electoral document known to exist showed the PSL taking 54 percent of the vote in Kielce Voivodeship to the Democratic Bloc's 44 percent.

== Aftermath ==
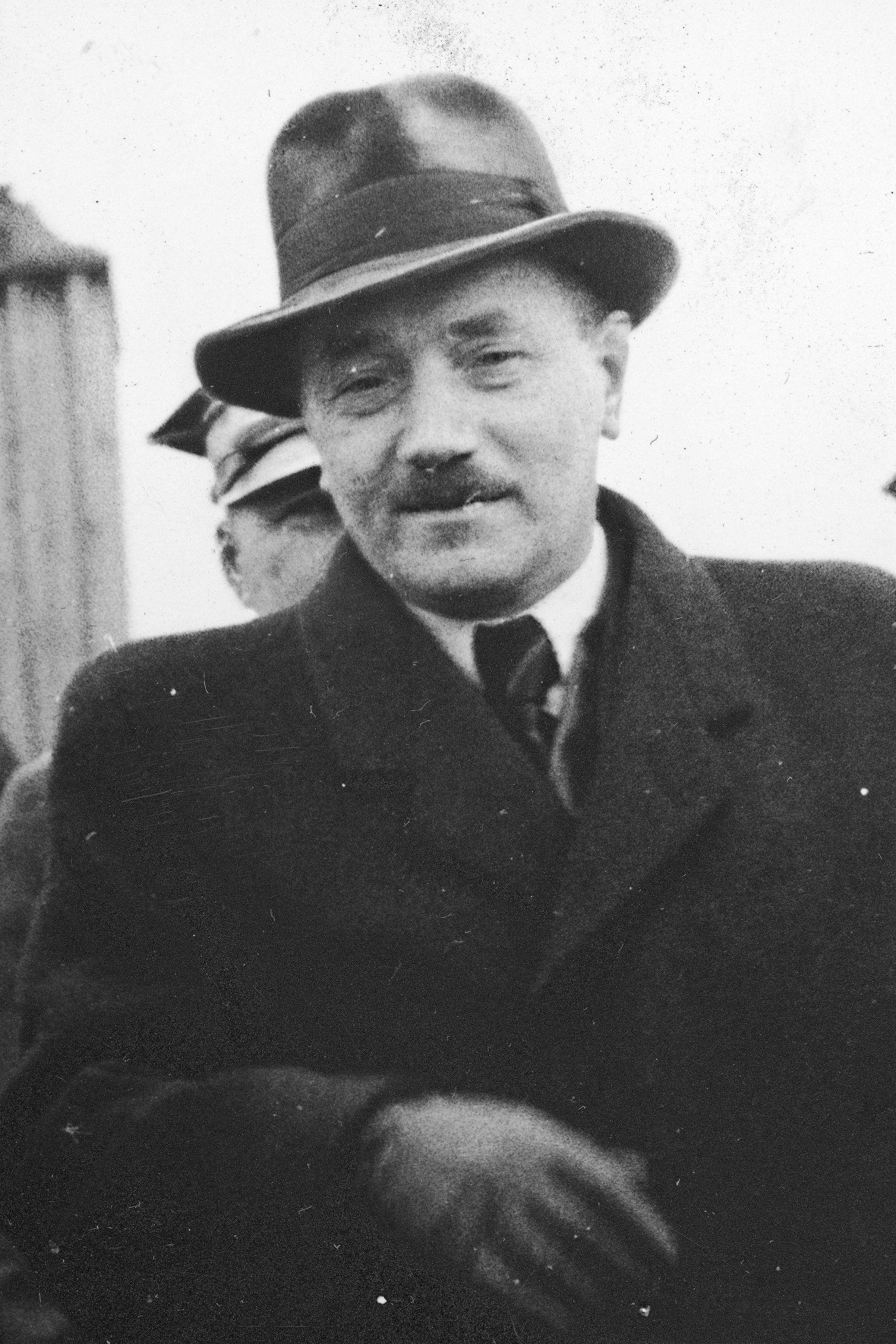
President Bierut, 1947

Many members of opposition parties, including Mikołajczyk who would have likely become the Prime Minister of Poland had the election been honest, saw no hope in further struggle; fearing for their lives, they left the country. Western governments issued only token protests, if any, which led many anti-Communist Poles to speak of postwar "Western betrayal". In the same year, the new Communist-dominated legislative Sejm adopted the Small Constitution of 1947, and Bierut, who was also a Soviet citizen, was elected president by the parliament. With the support of a majority in its own right and the departure of Mikołajczyk, the Communist-dominated government set about consolidating its now-total control over the country—a process completed in 1948, when the Communists forced what remained of the Polish Socialist Party to merge with them to form the Polish United Workers' Party.

Gomułka wanted to adapt the Soviet blueprint to Polish circumstances, and believed it was possible to be both a Communist and a Polish patriot at the same time. He was also wary of the Cominform and opposed forced collectivization of agriculture. His line was branded as "rightist-nationalist deviation", and he was pushed out as party leader in 1948 in favour of Bierut.

The PSL lingered on for a year and a half under increasing harassment. In 1949, the rump of the PSL merged with the pro-Communist People's Party to form the United People's Party. Along with the other legal minor party in Poland, the Democratic Party, it was part of the Communist-led coalition; however, this grouping increasingly took on a character similar to other "coalitions" in the Communist world. The ZSL and SD were reduced to being mostly subservient satellites of the Communists, and were required to accept the Communists' "leading role" as a condition of their continued existence. As a result, this would be the last election in which true opposition parties would be even nominally allowed to take part until the partly free election of 1989.

== See also ==
- History of Poland#Post-war struggle for power
