= Polish People's Party (1945–1949) =

Polish People's Party Polskie Stronnictwo Ludowe
- Leader: Wincenty Witos (1945), Stanisław Mikołajczyk (1946–47), Józef Niećko (1947–49)
- Founded: 1945; 81 years ago
- Dissolved: 1949; 77 years ago
- Preceded by: People's Party
- Succeeded by: United People's Party
- Headquarters: Warsaw, Poland
- Youth wing: Rural Youth Alliance of the Republic of Poland "Wici"
- Ideology: Christian democracy Agrarianism
- Political position: Centre
- International affiliation: Green International

The Polish People's Party (Polish Peasant Party, Polskie Stronnictwo Ludowe – PSL) existed in post-World War II Poland from 1945 to 1949. In a period of increasing solidification of communist power in Poland but with the political system retaining some formal adherence to multiparty democracy principles, the PSL was a broadly left-wing non-communist party that was not allied with the communists. The PSL was defeated by the communist-based bloc in the rigged legislative elections of 1947.

== Polish People's Party in post-World War II politics ==
A provisional government, declared as the Polish Committee of National Liberation was established by Polish communists and allied politicians in July 1944 in Lublin, when Poland was being liberated from the Nazi German occupation by the Soviet and Polish armies. The communists were pressured by the United States and Britain, as discussed by their leaders with Joseph Stalin at the Yalta Conference, to admit into the Polish government participants of the democratic opposition, including members of the London-based Polish government-in-exile.

Former prime minister of that government, Stanisław Mikołajczyk, returned to Poland in June 1945 and became deputy prime minister and minister of agriculture in the so-called Provisional Government of National Unity, dominated by the communists and their allied faction of the Polish Socialist Party. Mikołajczyk revived the prewar agrarian People's Party, led by Wincenty Witos, as his power base. Under Mikołajczyk, the party became the Polish People's Party.

The party's goal was to prevent the communists from monopolizing power in Poland, establish a parliamentary system with market economy and to win free elections, which were promised by the Yalta agreements. The hopes of the PSL were based on the party's ability to function legally, run its own network of offices, hold public meetings and publish in its own press. However, such accomplishments were threatened by the often intense harassment and repression, including newspaper censorship, forcible breaking up of party's meetings, and members' arrests, assaults and police intimidation. The armed right-wing underground declared war on all who "collaborated" with the communists, including Mikołajczyk and his party. Tens of PSL-connected people were killed. The communist attacks and provocations were sometimes presented as actions of the underground; the opposite charge, of PSL cooperation with the armed subversion was also made and led in some instances to banning of PSL activities.

In actuality, the PSL press condemned the nationalistic and other armed underground, calling them reactionaries, fascists or bandits and considering the murders and other violent actions committed by them to be criminal acts. The violence and the trials of the underground members were often covered in detail by the PSL newspapers. Mikołajczyk, who issued his own condemnations, feared that a civil war could lead to the Polish state being liquidated.

In February 1946, the PSL congress passed the party's general program. It confirmed a neighborly alliance with the Soviet Union and the ongoing reconstruction of the socioeconomic system. The document stated "Neither land will return to the great land owners, nor industry to the industrialists or banks to the bankers". Mikołajczyk approved the fundamental aspects of the communist-led reform and hoped for the system's democratic evolution, but kept his distance from the communist politics of power.

The government in exile, no longer internationally recognized, but holding onto its claim of exclusive legitimacy, renounced Mikołajczyk, its former chief, and declared him a traitor.

However, the most important and numerous anti-communist underground organization Freedom and Independence (WiN), which originated from the wartime Home Army, practically supported the PSL and its election effort. Freedom and Independence helped with distribution of printed election materials where obstructed by communist officials and appealed for voting for the PSL.

The parliamentary elections took place in January 1947 and were falsified in a number of ways, to defeat the People's Party and ensure the victory of the communists Polish Workers' Party and its allied partners in the so-called Democratic Bloc, which included a rival breakaway peasant party. The PSL for the time being remained legal, but was subjected to still increased suppression. Communist accusations of the PSL's cooperation with the armed underground intensified and culminated in the show "Kraków trial" of the late summer 1947. Two PSL leaders were tried together with several activists of the WiN underground formation, but unlike the WiN people, they were spared the death sentences.

In early October 1947, the PSL's executive committee declared that state authorities were preventing PSL's further functioning as a party. Mikołajczyk himself fled to the West on 20 October with American help, to avoid imprisonment and possible execution. The PSL lingered on for another year and a half before its remains were cajoled into merging with the communist-controlled peasant party to form the United People's Party (only a few of Mikołajczyk's people remained within the new structure), a formal participant of the communist-led ruling coalition.

== Historical context, People's Party's role ==
For the Polish peasant or agrarian movement, the developments following World War II were a continuation of their struggle from the period preceding the war. The movement's leaders, including Mikołajczyk, were deeply opposed to the Polish prewar Sanation regime and saw the communist restrictions on freedom as no different from the Sanation persecution of the peasant movement. In contrast to the period's glorification in post-1989 Poland, after the war the peasant activists' recollections and sentiments were strongly unfavorable. They themselves announced a "People's Poland" program already before the war. Such factors made the post-war peasant leaders, more than the representatives of other segments of Polish society, inclined to consider compromise political solutions.

On the other hand, by the communists organized around the Polish Workers' Party, the Polish People's Party was seen as the greatest threat to the power they held from 1944. The state security apparatus (NKVD terror was also very active and Red Army garrisons were common in the country) concentrated its attacks and other hostile activities on the PSL and in particular on Mikołajczyk, considered the chief enemy from 1945 until the time of the 1947 elections and afterwards. In 1945 the communists pressured Mikołajczyk to join their election bloc, which he refused as an attempt to preempt the elections.

In post-1989 Poland, the efforts of the post-war armed underground have been apotheosized by the Institute of National Remembrance and other circles.^{[a]} But Polish society back in the 1940s supported mostly the difficult decision and political fight of Stanisław Mikołajczyk. He was received by cheering crowds when in 1945 he flew in from Moscow, where he had participated in the provisional government negotiations. Poland's population was 75% rural and the PSL knew it was capable of electoral victory. Their tactics were resented and considered treasonous by some émigré circles and some had doubts in Poland as well. Mikołajczyk's political compromises went as far as voting together with the communists, as a government member in 1946, for taking away the Polish citizenship from the upper rank military officers who failed to return to Poland from the West after the war.

Approving the whole political deal between the Polish communists and Mikołajczyk's PSL (participation in the coalition, but still communist-dominated provisional government), Joseph Stalin had in mind a mission for Mikołajczyk: his designated role was to give legitimacy to the communist rule. After Mikołaczyk's rejection of the scheme had become clear, Stalin instructed Poland's president Bolesław Bierut to "allow" the PSL only 7% of the vote in the upcoming national parliamentary election.

From the beginning, Mikołajczyk opposed military fight against the communists; he felt that the Yalta and Potsdam agreements gave free elections a fighting chance in Poland and his political instincts required him to follow that route to its conclusion. He would either win or discredit the communists, depriving them in the eyes of the Polish and world opinion of the legitimacy they sought.

Some in the PSL wanted confrontation with the communists and quietly supported the armed underground, for example Stefan Korboński. Others in the leadership, notably the prewar activists Czesław Wycech and Józef Niećko, felt that in order for the movement to survive, the situation required a more pragmatic approach. After Mikołajczyk's rejection of participation in the pro-communist bloc, they decided to ally their faction with the communist party. In that form the party (United People's Party) and the rural movement survived the decades of communist rule in Poland. Some activists purged from the PSL in the 1940s were able to return and play a constructive role following the Polish thaw of 1956. After 1989, in democratic Poland, the party reformed itself and was able to successfully enter competitive elections, as the Polish People's Party again.

Despite Mikołajczyk's political moderation and being the leader of the main compromise faction of his movement, for the communist party chief Władysław Gomułka, whose hatred he attracted, the peasant leader was a personification of a return to Poland's prewar reality. Harassed by Gomułka, Mikołajczyk had to leave Poland, but even then he remained continuously observed by the communist intelligence.^{[b]}

In the eyes of the US Ambassador Arthur Bliss Lane and Western leaders in general, the Polish events, characterized by Mikołajczyk after his flight from Poland as rape, meant the denial of illusions of Soviet political trustworthiness. By forcing the communists to subject themselves to this test, Mikołajczyk, a tragic hero, fulfilled his secondary mission. His primary one was to win democratic elections in Poland.

== Election results ==
=== Sejm ===
Year	Popular vote	% of vote	Seats
1947	1,154,847	10.27 (#2)	28 / 444

== See also ==
- People's Party (Poland)
- Polish People's Party "Piast"
- Polish People's Party "Wyzwolenie"
- Stronnictwo Chłopskie
- United People's Party (Poland)
- Polish People's Party

== Notes ==
a. Soldiers of the post-war anti-communist underground functioned within several different organizations, often hostile toward one another. Even taken in their totality, they amounted to a relatively small undertaking of about 20,000 men. They are now, including the most extreme right wing faction, officially celebrated by the Polish legislature and government.

b. Władysław Gomułka would soon himself be persecuted by Bolesław Bierut, a communist rival.
