= Stanisław Mikołajczyk =

Polish politician (1901–1966)

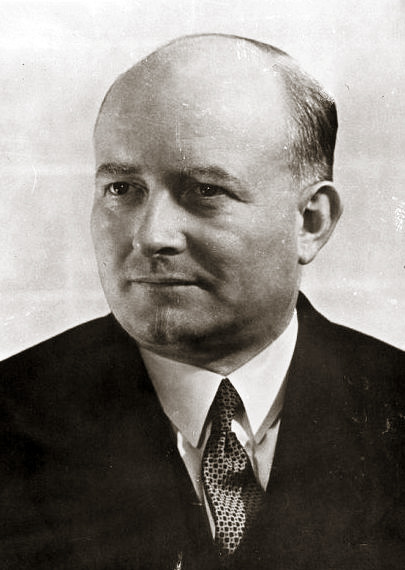
- Mikołajczyk in 1946

Prime Minister of Poland
- In exile 14 July 1943 – 24 November 1944
- President: Władysław Raczkiewicz
- Deputy: Jan Kwapiński; Jan Stanisław Jankowski
- Preceded by: Władysław Sikorski
- Succeeded by: Tomasz Arciszewski (Polish government-in-exile); Edward Osóbka-Morawski (in country)

Deputy Prime Minister of Poland
- In office 28 June 1945 – 6 February 1947
- President: Bolesław Bierut
- Prime Minister: Edward Osóbka-Morawski
- Preceded by: Stanisław Janusz
- Succeeded by: Antoni Korzycki; Aleksander Zawadzki; Hilary Minc; Hilary Chełchowski; Stefan Jędrychowski; Tadeusz Gede

Minister of Agriculture and Agricultural Reforms
- In office 28 June 1945 – 6 February 1947
- President: Bolesław Bierut
- Prime Minister: Edward Osóbka-Morawski
- Preceded by: Edward Bertold
- Succeeded by: Jan Dąb-Kocioł

Leader of the Polish People's Party
- In office 31 October 1945 – 27 October 1947
- Preceded by: Wincenty Witos
- Succeeded by: Józef Niećko

Personal details
- Born: 18 July 1901 Dorsten, German Empire
- Died: 13 December 1966 (aged 65) Washington, D.C., United States
- Party: People's Party; Polish People's Party

Stanisław Mikołajczyk (Polish: [staˈɲiswav mikɔˈwajt͡ʂɨk]; 18 July 1901 – 13 December 1966) was a Polish politician and agrarian statesman. Born in Westphalia to a family from Poznań, he rose through the ranks of the Polish People's Party "Piast" and was elected to the Sejm in 1929.

During World War II, he served as a Prime Minister of the Polish government-in-exile from 1943 to 1944, succeeding Władysław Sikorski. He worked to resist Soviet plans to annex Poland's eastern territories and impose Communist rule, though his efforts were ultimately unsuccessful against Allied diplomatic pressure.

After the war, Mikołajczyk returned to Poland and led the Polish People's Party (PSL), which grew into the largest party in the country. Despite widespread popular support, the Communists prevented a free election; the fraudulent 1947 Polish legislative election reduced the PSL to 28 parliamentary seats. Mikołajczyk resigned in protest, fled Poland in October 1947, and emigrated to the United States, where he died in 1966. His remains were returned to Poland for burial in June 2000.

== Biography ==
=== Background and early life ===
Mikołajczyk's family came from Poznań in western Poland, which in the 19th century was part of the German Empire and known as the Province of Posen. He was born in Westphalia in western Germany, where his parents had gone to look for work in the wealthy mining regions, as many Poles—known as Ruhr Poles—did in the 19th century. He returned to Poznań as a boy of ten.

As a teenager, he worked in a sugar beet refinery and was active in Polish patriotic organisations. He was 18 when Poland recovered its independence, and in 1920 he joined the Polish Army and took part in the Polish–Soviet War. He was discharged after being wounded near Warsaw and returned to inherit his father's farm near Poznań.

=== Early political career ===
In the 1920s, Mikołajczyk became active in the Polish People's Party "Piast" (PSL), and after holding a number of offices in the government of Poznań province, he was elected to the Sejm (the Polish Parliament) in 1929. In 1935, he became vice-chairman of the executive committee of the PSL, and in 1937 he became party President. He opposed the authoritarian regime established in Poland after the death of Józef Piłsudski in 1935.

=== World War II ===
When Nazi Germany invaded Poland in September 1939, Mikołajczyk was a private in the Polish army, and served in the defence of Warsaw. After the fall of Warsaw he escaped to Hungary, where he was interned. He soon escaped and made his way to Paris via Yugoslavia and Italy. By the end of November, Mikołajczyk had reached France where he was immediately asked to join the Polish government-in-exile as Deputy Chairman of the Polish National Council. In 1941, he was appointed Minister of the Interior and became Deputy Prime Minister under Władysław Sikorski. In April 1943, the Germans announced the discovery of the graves of almost 22,000 Polish officers who had been murdered by the Soviets at Katyn. The Soviet government said that the Germans had fabricated the discovery. The Allied governments, for diplomatic reasons, formally accepted this, but Mikołajczyk's government refused to do so, and Stalin then severed relations with the government in exile.

=== Prime Minister in exile ===
When Sikorski was killed in a plane crash in July 1943, Mikołajczyk was appointed as his successor. "We do not wish to see only a formal democracy in Poland," he said in his broadcast to Poland on taking office, "but a social democracy which will put into practice not only political, religious and personal freedom but also social and economic freedom, the Four Freedoms of which Franklin Delano Roosevelt spoke so finely. In any case, there is and will be no place in Poland for any kind of totalitarian government in any shape or form."

However, Mikołajczyk faced daunting challenges. It was obvious by this time that the Soviet armed forces, not those of the western Allies, would seize Poland from German occupation, and the Poles feared that Stalin intended both imposing Communism on Poland and annexing Poland's eastern territories.

During 1944 the Allied leaders, particularly Winston Churchill, tried to bring about a resumption of talks between Mikołajczyk and Stalin, but these efforts broke down over several issues. One was the Katyn massacre. Another was Poland's postwar borders. Stalin insisted that the eastern territories should remain in Soviet hands. Mikołajczyk also opposed Stalin's plan to set up a Communist government in postwar Poland.

As a result, Stalin agreed that there would be a coalition government in the Soviet-seized territories of Poland. A Socialist, Edward Osóbka-Morawski, became Prime Minister of the new Provisional Government of National Unity, and the Communist leader Władysław Gomułka became one of two Deputy Prime Ministers. Mikołajczyk resigned as Prime Minister of the government in exile to return to Poland and become the other Deputy Prime Minister and Minister for Agriculture. Many of the Polish exiles opposed this action, believing that this government was a façade for the establishment of Communist rule in Poland. The government in exile maintained its existence, although it no longer had diplomatic recognition as the legal government of Poland.

=== Return to Poland ===
Following his return, Mikołajczyk immediately set about reviving the PSL, which soon became by far the largest party in Poland. Some have argued he was further aided by the radical land reform pushed through in accordance with the programme of the Polish Workers' Party (PPR), because it "created a new class of small farmers who became a firm political base for the PSL." Poland had been a largely rural society in any case, and Mikołajczyk's platform was not a conservative smallholder programme. The Communists knew they would never win a free or fair election in Poland, and so they set about preventing one, despite the nominal pledges given by Stalin at the Yalta Conference.

In June 1946, the 3xTAK referendum was held on a number of issues. The PSL decided to oppose the proposal calling for the abolition of the Senate as a test of strength against the Communists: two-thirds of voters supported Mikołajczyk, but the Communist-controlled Interior Ministry issued faked results showing the opposite result.

Between then and the January 1947 general elections, the PSL was subjected to ruthless persecution, and hundreds of its candidates were prevented from campaigning. From 1946 to 1948, military courts sentenced 32,477 people, most of them members of democratic parties, for 'crimes against the state'. Only then were the elections held. In order to be sure that the elections would produce the 'correct' results, the Polish security apparatus recruited 47% of the members of electoral committees as agents.

The elections produced a parliament with 394 seats for the Communist-controlled "Democratic Bloc" and 28 for the PSL, a result which everyone knew could only be obtained through massive electoral fraud. Indeed, the opposition claimed that it would have won as much as 80 percent of the vote had the election been conducted in a fair manner.

=== Later life ===
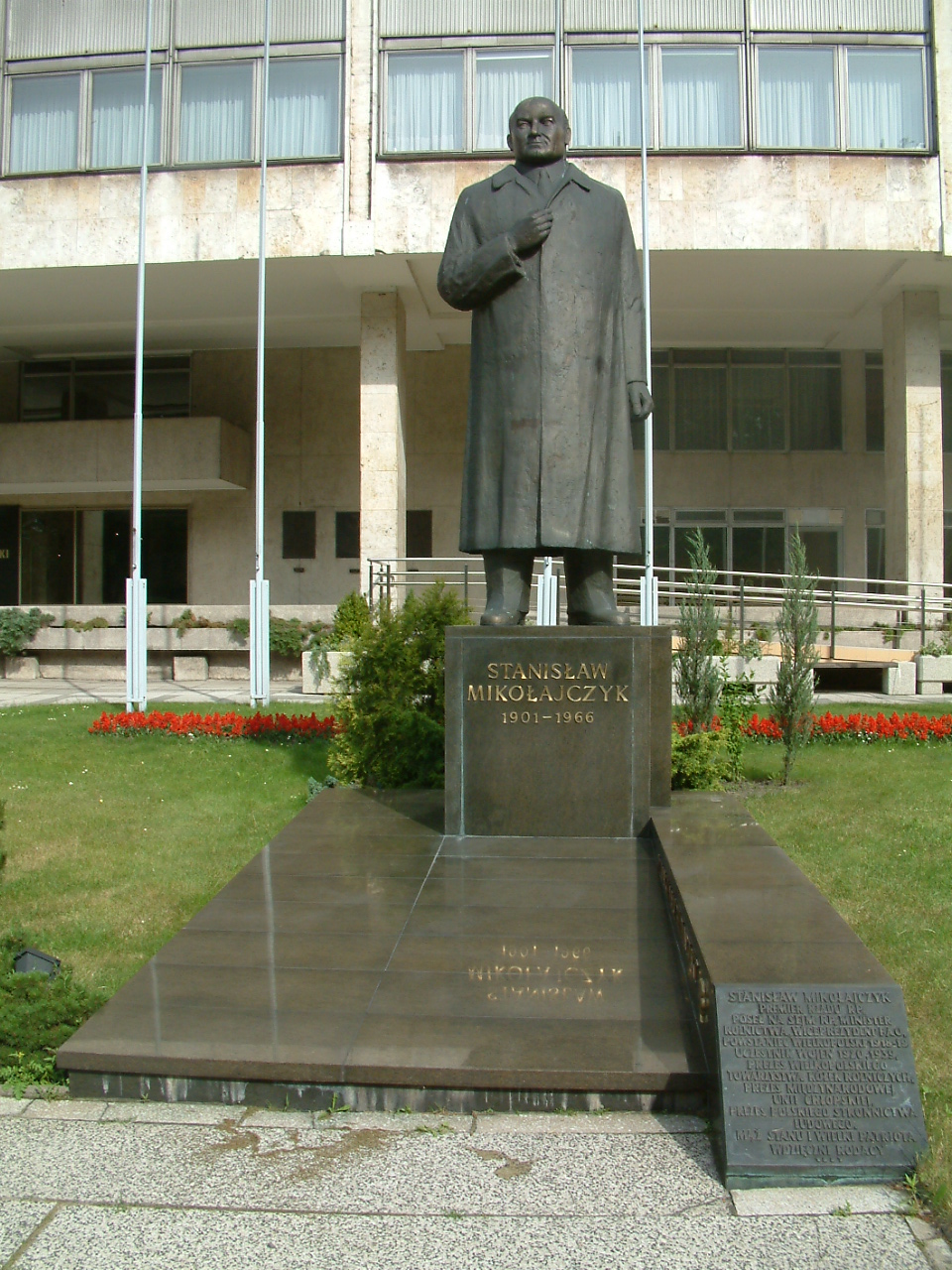
A monument to Stanisław Mikołajczyk in Poznań

Mikołajczyk, who would likely have become Prime Minister had the election been honest, immediately resigned from the government in protest. Facing arrest, he left the country in October. Winston Churchill, upon seeing him in London, remarked: "I am surprised you made it out alive." In London, the Polish government in exile regarded him as a traitor for having co-operated with the Communists. He emigrated to the United States, where he died in 1966.

In June 2000, his remains were returned for burial in Poland. His papers are in the Hoover Institution on War, Revolution and Peace at Stanford University.

A film, The Right to Vote (O Prawo Głosu, 2008, directed by Janusz Petelski), tells the story of Mikołajczyk's (played by Adam Ferency) struggle.

== Bibliography ==
- Stanisław Mikołajczyk: The Rape of Poland: The Pattern of Soviet Aggression. Sampson Low, Martson & Co., LTD., London 1948. Whittlesey House, McGraw-Hill Book Company, New York, 1948 .

== See also ==
- Western betrayal
- Polish People's Party (1945–1949)

Political offices
Preceded by Władysław Sikorski	Prime Minister of the Polish Republic in Exile; 1943–1944	Succeeded by Tomasz Arciszewski
