= People's Party (Poland) =

People's Party Stronnictwo Ludowe
- Founded: 1931
- Dissolved: 1945
- Merger of: PSL "Piast"; PSLW; SCh
- Succeeded by: Polish People's Party; Polish People's Party "Nowe Wyzwolenie"
- Headquarters: Warsaw
- Ideology: Populism; Agrarianism
- Political position: Centre
- International affiliation: International Agrarian Bureau

Party flag

The People's Party (Stronnictwo Ludowe, SL) was a Polish political party, active from 1931 in the Second Polish Republic. An agrarian populist party, its power base was mostly farmers and rural population.

In 1931, it was created from the merger of three other, smaller, peasant-based parties: centre-right Polish People's Party "Piast" (PSL "Piast"), centre-left Polish People's Party "Wyzwolenie" (PSLW) and left wing Peasant Party.

During the Second World War, it was known as 'Stronnictwo Ludowe Roch' and its military arm, Peasant Battalions, was part of the Polish resistance movement in World War II.

After the end of the war, the People's Party under the leadership of Wincenty Witos decided to support Stanisław Mikołajczyk. However at the same time Polish communists named one of their proxy parties Stronnictwo Ludowe, and the old People's Party, now loyal to Mikołajczyk, changed its name into Polish People's Party (PSL).

After Mikołajczyk's defeat in the rigged 1947 Polish legislative election, the remains of the Polish People's Party were merged (in 1949) into the communist-allied United People's Party (ZSL).
