= Property restitution in Poland =

After World War II and coming to power of the communist government in Poland, large scale nationalization occurred. Following the fall of communism in Poland in 1989, some of the formerly nationalized property have been subject to reprivatisation and restored to previous owners, their heirs or other claimants.

The issue of restitution has become contentious in Israel-Poland relations. It has also been criticized in Poland for significant fraud and corruption.

== Background ==
During World War II, Nazi Germany and the Soviet Union occupied Poland. They both, in their respective area of occupation, confiscated significant amounts of property. After the Polish Communist government came to power in 1944, it also adopted a policy of large scale nationalization of property in what constituted Poland after the War. The property that had previously been confiscated by Nazi Germany was now classified as "former German" or "abandoned" property.

A restitution law "On Abandoned Real Estates" of May 6, 1945 allowed property owners who had been dispossessed, or their relatives and heirs, whether residing in Poland or outside the country, to reclaim privately owned property under a simplified inheritance procedure. The law remained in effect until the end of 1948. An expedited court process with minimal costs was put in place to handle claims. Applications had to be examined within 21 days, and many claims were processed the day they were filed. The Communist government enacted legislation on "abandoned property", placing severe limitations on inheritance not present in pre-war inheritance law which allowed inheritance by second-degree relatives, limiting restitution to the original owners or direct heirs. The unprecedented rate of extermination of Polish Jews in conjunction with the fact that only Jewish property was officially confiscated by the Nazis suggests "abandoned property" was equivalent to "Jewish property". Communist officials did not conceal this, the formulators of the law argued that it was necessary to prevent wealth concentration in the hands of "unproductive and parasite factors". The initial 1945 decrees were superseded by a 1946 law, with a claims deadline of 31 December 1947 (later extended to 31 December 1948) after which property devolved to the Polish state. Even if Jews regained de jure control, when it was occupied by Poles additional lengthy proceedings were required. The majority of Jewish claimants could not afford the restitution process due to the filing costs, legal fees, and inheritance tax, although all claimants could apply to have these fees waived, or could receive support from state organizations established for that purpose.

Vast quantities of Jewish property were unclaimed due to some Jews being murdered when they sought restitution of family property and due to Jews fleeing postwar Poland. The murders, variously estimated, intimidated Jews from filing claims. Unclaimed Jewish property devolved to the Polish state on 31 December 1948, but many Jews who had fled to the Soviet Union were only repatriated after this date. Polish legislation in 1947 severely restricted intestate succession, limiting inheritance by distant family members. Jews who returned to Poland from the Soviet Union and settled in the territories Poland acquired from Germany were entitled to material compensation on equal footing with ethnic Poles who were displaced from Eastern Poland.

After the fall of Communism in 1989, the issue of restitution of property that had been confiscated during the War and nationalised after the War resurfaced, with a number of parties, both domestic (such as the Roman Catholic Church in Poland) and international (such as the Jewish diaspora), claiming that they were unfairly treated in the past and insisting that the issue be revisited.

== Communal claims ==
In 1989, the Polish government passed laws setting out the restitution procedure for religious organizations. The Commission for the Catholic Church, the first such commission, began operations in 1989, and was active until 2011. It received 3,063 requests, out of which over 2,000 were reviewed positively, resulting in restitution of the property to the claimants. Property commissions for other denominations were created over the next few years. The one for the Evangelical Church was established in 1994, and the ones for the Polish Orthodox Church, and the Jewish Qahal in Poland (represented later by the Union of Jewish Religious Communities in Poland) were created in 1997.

According to attorney Stephen Denburg, the Jewish communities were not treated fairly. Four years later, the World Jewish Restitution Organization (WJRO) signed an agreement with the Polish government which gave that organization the right to negotiate for repatriation of Jewish property. In 1997 Polish parliament passed a law on restitution of Jewish communal property, but not on property owned by private individuals.

== Private claims ==
Poland entered into twelve Indemnity Treaties between 1948 and 1971, under which Poland paid a specific lump sum to the other states, and Poland and its citizens and legal persons were released from further liability for damages, with compensation obligations being transferred to the other states. No indemnity treaty has been entered into with Israel.

One of those treaties was with the United States, signed on 16 July 1960, that allowed all compensation claims of US citizens to be directed to and dealt with by the US government. Under the treaty, Poland paid to US authorities $40 million (in 1960 values) over 20 years, in full settlement of the claims of US nationals for claims covered by the agreement. In total, 10,169 claims were lodged in the US, with over 5,022 awards made. The awards amounted to $100,737,681.63 principal, and $51,051,825.01 interest.

== Controversies ==
Property restitution continues to be contentious. The Communist regime in Poland entered into some settlements with international parties, but little compensation has been given to the Polish citizens who remained in Poland. Restoration of property to the Roman Catholic Church, argued to be the biggest beneficiary, has been criticized as unduly favoring that institution. Efforts to restore Jewish property in Eastern Europe, including Poland (where estimates of the value of seized Jewish private property range up to at least $2–3 billion according to some estimates.), often caused a resurgence of antisemitism. A number of restitution cases has been plagued by corruption and fraud (see reprivatisation fraud in Warsaw), as well as controversial treatment of low-income tenants, many of whom were suddenly evicted once properties changed hands. In 2011 a Polish tenant right activist, Jolanta Brzeska, died in suspicious circumstances, sparking another controversy.

In 2015, the U.S. State Department Special Envoy on Holocaust Issues described the legal situation in Poland, regarding the restitution of private property, as "especially cumbersome, challenging, time consuming and expensive for claimants outside of Poland." As of 2018, Poland was the last of the European Union and Eastern European post-communist states not to enact a comprehensive restitution bill.

In 2021, Poland enacted a law setting a 30-year time limit on appealing administrative decisions made by special administrative bodies, effectively meaning that owners of property seized in the communist era can no longer receive compensation. The law sparked a diplomatic incident with Israel. Israel's Foreign Minister Yair Lapid described it as “immoral and a disgrace.” Polish Prime Minister Mateusz Morawiecki said “I can only say that as long as I am the prime minister, Poland will not pay for German crimes: Neither zloty, nor euro, nor dollar.” After Poland's President Andrzej Duda signed the law on 14 August, Israel recalled its envoy from Poland and told the Polish ambassador not to return. US Secretary of State Antony Blinken had also spoken out against the law, and urged Poland “to develop a clear, efficient and effective legal procedure to resolve confiscated property claims and provide some measure of justice for victims. In the absence of such a procedure, this legislation will harm all Polish citizens whose property was unjustly taken, including that of Polish Jews who were victims of the Holocaust.”

== See also ==
- Bug River property
- History of Jews in Poland § Jewish property
- Justice for Uncompensated Survivors Today (JUST) Act of 2017
- Reparations Agreement between Israel and the Federal Republic of Germany
- Reprivatization in Poland
- Reprivatisation fraud in Warsaw
