= Nationalization in Poland =

After the end of World War II, the Communist government in Poland instituted large scale nationalizations in Poland starting in 1944.

Various forms of nationalization in Poland had been suggested by socialist parties and politicians during the era of the Second Polish Republic (1918–1939). Following the communist takeover of Poland in the aftermath of World War II, the new communist government issued a number of decrees nationalizing significant parts of Polish property in the years 1944–1956.

== Interwar Poland ==
Following the restoration of Polish independence in 1918, a number of primarily socialist parties and politicians (e.g. the Polish People's Party "Wyzwolenie", Provisional People's Government of the Republic of Poland of Ignacy Daszyński) issued promises of nationalization. As the politics and government of Poland stabilized, nationalization policy lost its support, and the March Constitution of 1921 contained property-protecting provisions that made nationalization difficult.

== Communist-era nationalization ==
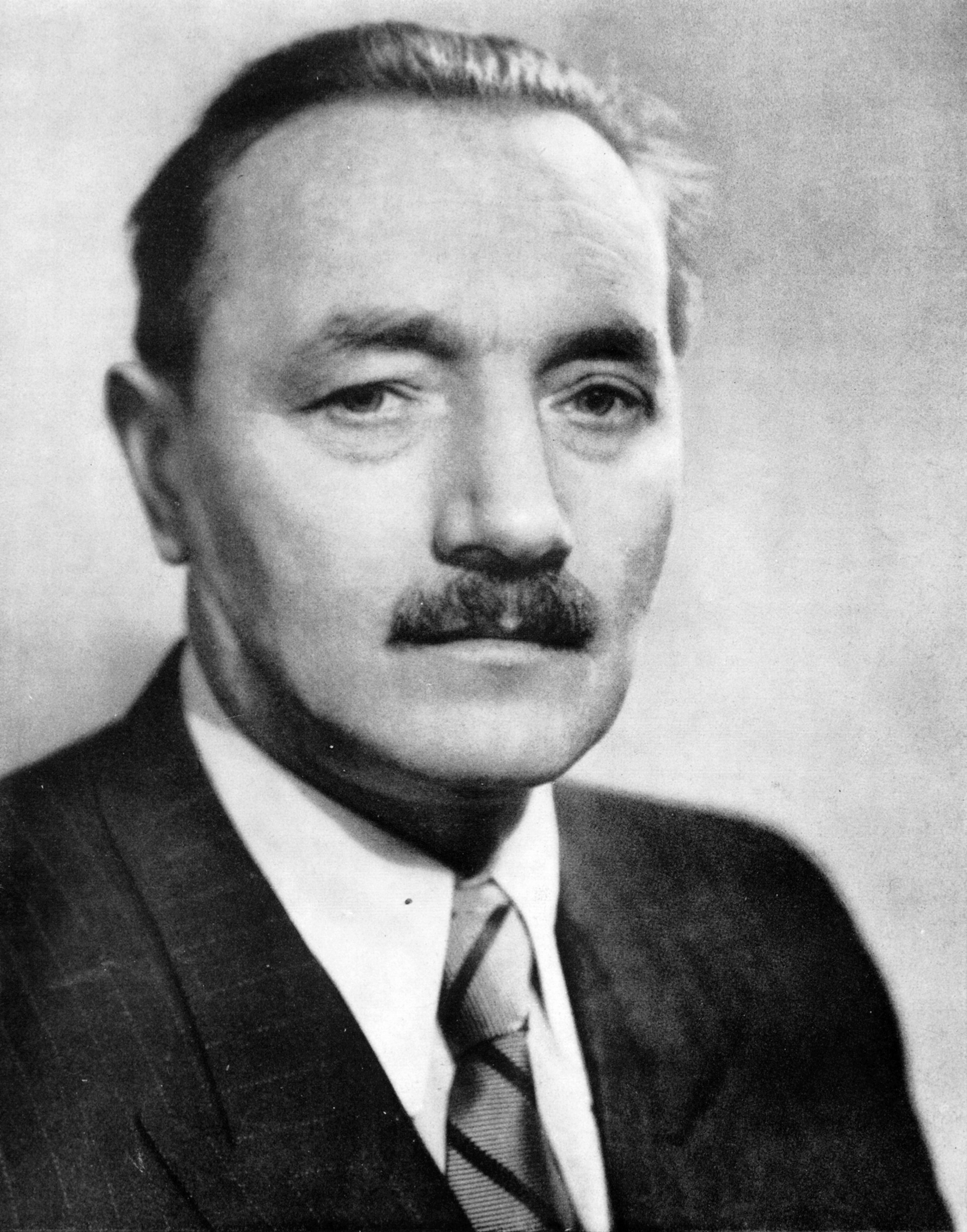
Communist politician Bolesław Bierut was the head of the Polish government in the late 1940s and early 1950s, a period which saw the implementation of most of the nationalization programs.

The idea of nationalization returned during World War II, as most of the Polish underground parties of the Polish Underground State declared support for nationalization of the occupants' (mainly German) property as well as that of variously defined 'traitors and collaborators'. As the Soviet armies advanced westward and entered former Polish territories, the provisional Polish communist government (Polish Committee of National Liberation) similarly promised confiscation of property stolen by the Germans, and its redistribution.

Among the earliest nationalization laws passed by the Polish communist government was the Land Reform Decree of 6 September 1944, which nationalized all privately owned land of over 50 agricultural or otherwise over 100 hectares. Another law passed on 14 December 1944 nationalized forests. All medium and large industries falling into the communist sphere of influence were immediately placed into a "temporary" state ownership, first without legal backing, but made legal by several decrees of 1945. A 1945 decree known as the Bierut Decree nationalized most of the properties in the Polish capital of Warsaw. A related, wider-ranging laws (incorrectly named by German nationalists as the Bierut Decrees) on all abandoned property stated that such property would become a property of the state or other social institutions after 10 years. A wide-ranging nationalization Law on the Nationalization of Industry (Ustawa o nacjonalizacji przemysłu) was passed by the State National Council on 3 January 1946. It transferred to the state without compensation all formerly German property, as well as property of collaborators. It further declared that the state was taking over all companies in 17 branches of industry, and in all others, all medium and large companies. Compensation was provided to foreign owners only. Approximately 35,000 companies were nationalized by 1 October 1948. Certain other companies that were not under the scope of the 1946 law were nationalized in subsequent years (e.g. approximately 1,500 private pharmacies were nationalized in 1951), with the final batch nationalized by the Law of 25 February 1956.

Unlike in most other Eastern Bloc countries, only about a third of Polish agriculture became nationalized (generally in the form of large state farms, the PGRs), and the rest remained in the private sector.

== Nationalization/Repolonisation (2015–current) ==
Since 2015, under the Law and Justice (PiS) government, Poland has seen a growing wave of economic nationalism,

- with state-owned PZU in 2015 agreeing to buy a 25.3-percent stake in Alior Bank;
- PZU, together with the Polish Development Fund, buying a 32.8% stake in Bank Pekao by UniCredit in 2017;
- state-owned PKN Orlen merging with its fellow state-run utility Energa in 2020; and further plans to take over smaller rival Lotos.

The minister also suggested Poland should have greater control over the economy.

- On August 1, 2022, state-owned PKN Orlen finalised the merger with state-owned Lotos.

PKN Orlen has announced its intention to take over state-owned PGNiG, and on 10 May 2021, it submitted a takeover application to the Office of Competition and Consumer Protection. In October 2022, Shareholders of PGNiG approved the company's takeover by PKN Orlen, this came after PKN Orlen Shareholders done the same.

In late 2022, Jarosław Kaczyński said that the Polish Pis government might buy PKP Energetyka and Żabka convenience store from CVC Capital Partners. In January 2023, CVC signed a preliminary agreement for the sale of PKP Energetyka to state owned power company PGE.

On April 3, 2023 PGE Polish Energy Group acquired from the CVC Fund 100% of shares in PKPE Holding sp. z o.o. thus closing the purchase transaction of PKP Energetyka S.A.

== Reprivatisation (1989–current) ==
Further reading: Reprivatisation in Poland

Following the fall of communism in Poland in 1989, some of the formerly nationalized property has been subject to reprivatisation and restored to previous owners, their heirs or other claimants. However, as of late 2018, Poland still had no single, unified law regarding reprivatisation, and the process has been slow and based on a patchwork of several smaller, limited laws. In some cases this process have been proven to be highly contentious and controversial, opening the doors to fraud and corruption which exploited the loopholes in the imperfect laws regarding reprivatisation. Many of the controversies were focused on Warsaw, where the whole land was nationalised with the purpose of planned reconstruction of the city nearly completely destroyed during World War II. Reprivatisation of public spaces (schools, city parks, etc.) with subsequent repurposing and neglect created chaos and had led to considerable fraud. In 2017 the Polish government established a dedicated Commission for Issues of Warsaw Real Estate Reprivatisation; as of July 2018 the commission has reversed over a dozen of the decisions, but some of its rulings have led to further controversies and several trials.

== See also ==
- Battle for trade
- Three-Year Plan
