= Property restitution in Latvia =

After World War II and Soviet re-occupation of Latvia in 1944, large scale nationalization occurred in Latvia. Following the fall of communism in Latvia in 1989 and restoration of its independence, some of the formerly nationalized property have been subject to reprivatization and restored to previous owners, their heirs or other claimants.

Around 20 laws regarding property restitution were adopted in Latvia.

Latvia endorsed the 2009 Terezin Declaration on righting the Holocaust-era injustices..

== Building properties ==
According to the law "On the Denationalisation of Building Properties in the Republic of Latvia" (1994, with amendments), the following regulations were repealed:

- the Latvian SSR Supreme Soviet Presidium Decree of 28 October 1940, "On Nationalisation of Large Buildings", and all its legal derivatives
- the Latvian SSR Supreme Soviet Presidium Decree of 14 March 1941, "On the Inclusion of Country, Large-Scale, and Kulak Farms in the State Fund", the Latvian SSR Council of People's Commissars Decision No. 359 of 14 March 1941, "On the Approval of the List of Country, Large-Scale, and Kulak Farms to be Included in the State Fund", and all legal derivatives
- all Latvian SSR Supreme Soviet Presidium decrees which were base of nationalization of building properties owned by individual persons

The affected building properties shall be returned to their previous owners or their heirs, except for the ones which have been purchased by natural persons in good faith.
