= Reprivatisation fraud in Warsaw =

Polish political scandal

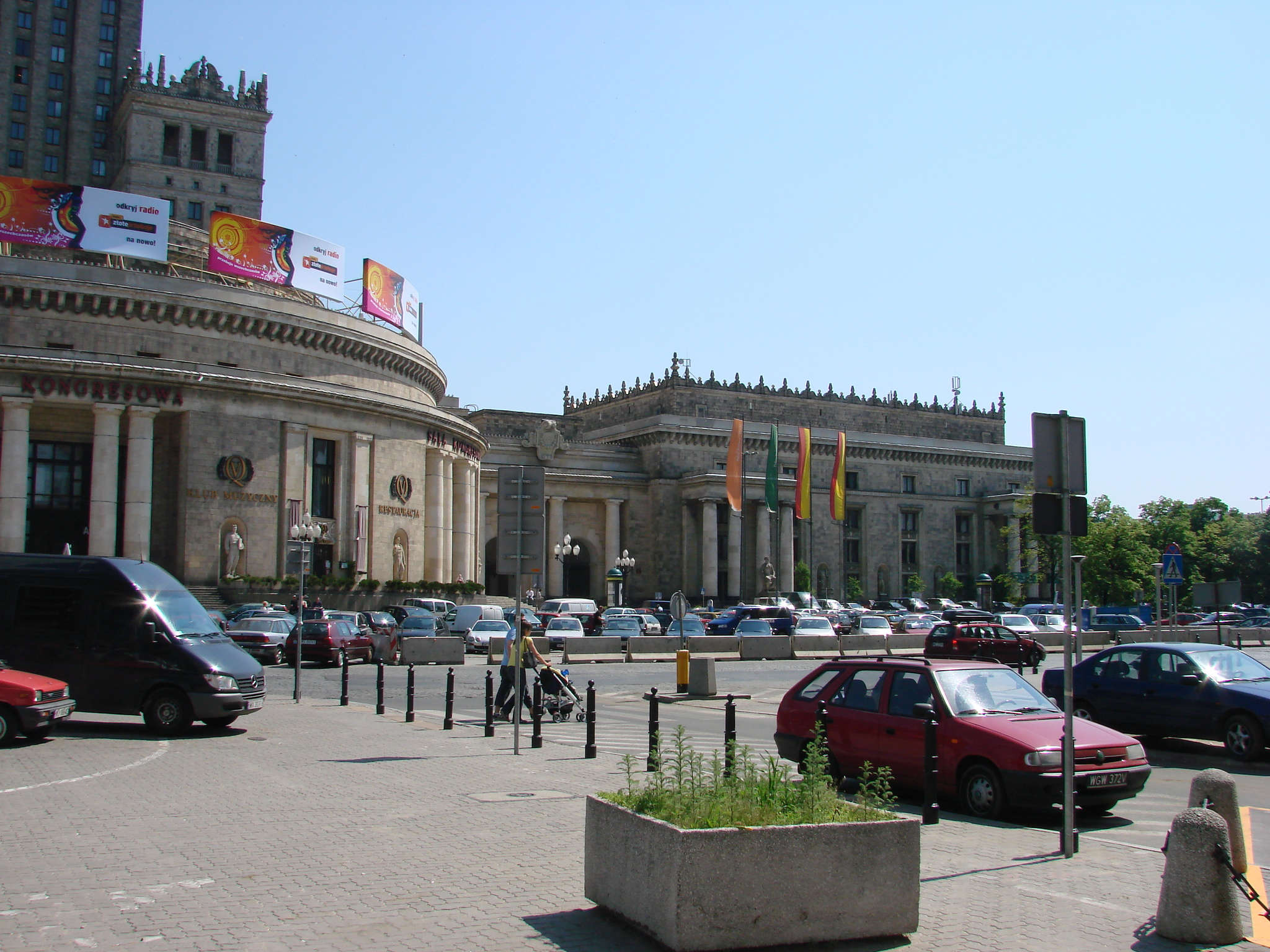
A lot by Chmielna Street (far upper right) that had stirred the reprivatisation scandal

The reprivatisation fraud in Warsaw happened on a massive scale during the reprivatisation in Warsaw, which was performed after the fall of the Communist Poland to reverse the post-World War II nationalisation of the land in the city.

A particularly notable affair regarding a lot on Chmielna Street in the downtown of Warsaw was uncovered after a series of investigative reports published by Gazeta Wyborcza in 2016. (This had earned the journalists the Grand Press 2016 award, the highest award for journalism in Poland and several other awards.)

In 2017 the Polish government established a dedicated Commission for Issues of Warsaw Real Estate Reprivatisation; as of July 2018 the Commission has reversed over a dozen of the decisions, but some of its rulings have led to further controversies and several trials.

== See also ==
- Miasto Jest Nasze
- Property restitution in Poland
