= Bierut Decree =

1945 nationalization of land in Warsaw

Bierut Decree or Warsaw Land Decree is a common name of the Decree on Ownership and Usufruct of Land in the Area of the Capital of Warsaw also translated as the Decree on Ownership and Use of Land in Warsaw (Polish: Dekret o własności i użytkowaniu gruntów na obszarze m. st. Warszawy) issued in Poland on 26 October 1945 by the State National Council. The Decree, named after the council's leader, Bolesław Bierut, nationalized most of the land properties in Warsaw.

== Background ==
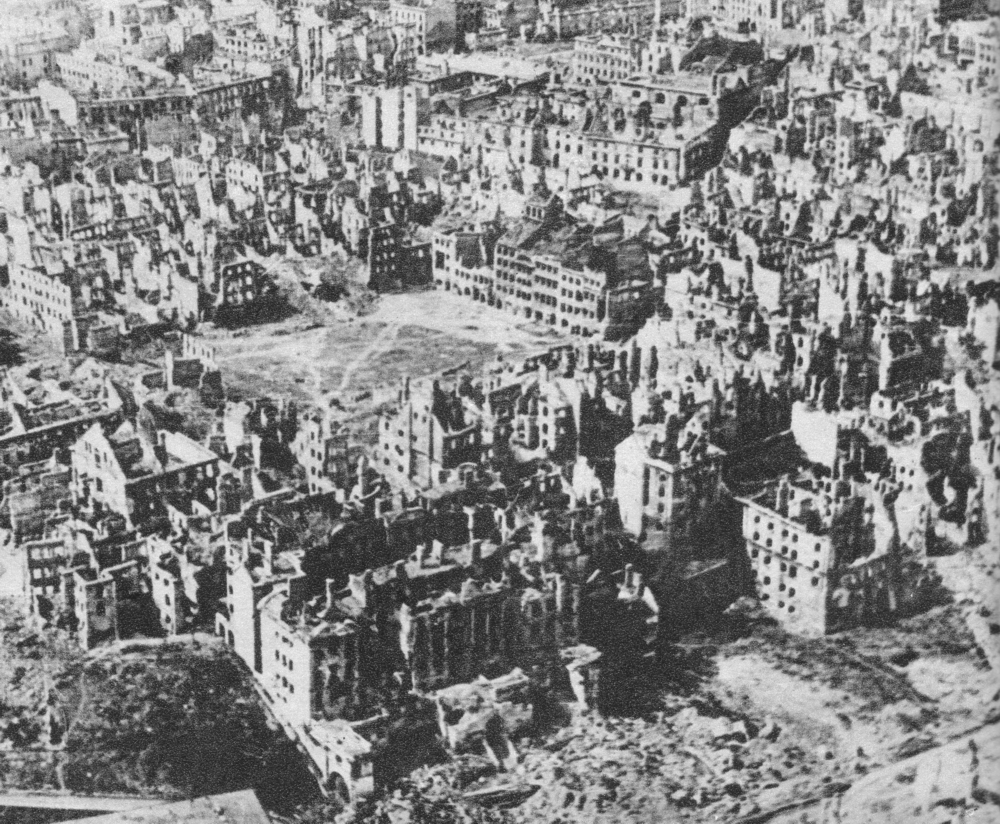
Warsaw, the capital of Poland, destroyed by German Nazis, January 1945.

During World War II, approximately 85% of Warsaw, Poland was destroyed.

== The decree ==
The Polish communist government (State National Council) of Bolesław Bierut passed a decree on 26 October 1945 on nationalization of all land. Its Article 1 says:

In order to ensure the rational way of the reconstruction of the capital and further its development in accordance with the needs of the People, in particular with the goal of quickly acquiring the grounds and their proper usage, all grounds within the territory of the capital city of Warsaw come into the possession of the gmina of the capital city of Warsaw on the day when this decree comes into force.

The decree did not nationalize the buildings (real estate) themselves. The decree allowed for those expropriated to claim compensation within six months of the decree's passage, but only a small percentage of the roughly 17,000 claims were accepted.

The nationalized property was first transferred to the city of Warsaw. In 1950 this property was taken over by the Polish State Treasury, and in 1990 it was returned to the city of Warsaw's administration.

While the Polish communist government was engaged in a wide-scale program of nationalization, the nationalization of Warsaw's properties has been described as a less of an ideological-driven and more of a practical solution, given the scope of the city's destruction. Deputy Director of the Historical Museum of Warsaw Jarosław Trybuś presents the following arguments in favor of the decree:

- It would have been a functional and aesthetical catastrophe if each of tens of thousands of property owners started reconstruction to their own tastes and purposes.
- The owners would have neither the interest nor the money to restore the historical buildings, e.g., within the Warsaw Old Town.

Trybuś also remarks that apart from the fact of forceful nationalisation, which some critics describe as lawless, most of the criticism of the decree regards not the decree per se, but rather the fact that it was implemented by Communist totalitarian regime.

== Reprivatization ==
Following the fall of communism in Poland in 1989, thousands of claims for restitution of nationalized property were made in Warsaw alone by former owners or their surviving heirs. As of 2018, 4,000 reprivatisation decisions have been taken, affecting about 450 properties consisting of over 4,500 occupied dwellings and over 17,000 tenants. Many claims are still outstanding as of 2018, due to opposition from tenant anti-reprivatisation activists and interference from fraudulent or exploitative, sometimes illegal, business ventures. As claimants frame their demands as fixing old injustices, tenant and anti-reprivatisation activists note that the public spaces are damaged, new landlords evict elderly tenants using underhanded methods, and city development becomes nearly impossible. A tenant activist, Jolanta Brzeska, was murdered in 2011, raising concerns of organized crime involvement in this area. A number of contentious privatization cases in Warsaw has grabbed the attention of Polish and even international press over the years.

== See also ==
- Battle for trade
- Nationalization in Poland
