= Bierut Decrees =

German term

Bierut Decrees German: Bierut-Dekrete is a term used in German historiography referring to a series of decrees, laws and regulations enacted by the Provisional Government of National Unity between 1945 and 1946 concerning the flight and expulsion of ethnic Germans from Poland and the property issues arising from them.

The "Bierut Decrees" are named after Bolesław Bierut, installed by the occupying Soviet forces as the leader of communist government of Poland between 1944 and his death in Moscow in 1956. Bierut functioned as head of the Provisional National Council, a Soviet influenced quasi-parliament (Krajowa Rada Narodowa), from 1944 to 1947.

The term presents a conscious echo of the Beneš decrees which have been seen by critics as providing a blue print for the ethnic cleansing of German and Hungarian minorities from Czechoslovakia between 1945 and 1948.

== Background ==
Following defeat of Nazi Germany in May 1945, political leaders from the allied powers met at Potsdam between July 17 and August 2 in order to progress agreement on the post-war settlement. Russian plans for Germany and Poland involved reducing Germany and annexation of the eastern part of the prewar Poland into the outlying republics of the Soviet Union. The Soviet acquisitions roughly corresponded to the partition along the Curzon line. On the western side of Poland the border was to be moved westward at the expense of Germany, to a new frontier following the Rivers Oder and Neisse. By the time of the Potsdam conference, Poland and eastern Germany were already occupied by Russian troops. A puppet government, loyal to Moscow, was well advanced with the systematic consolidation of control over Poland as defined according to the new de facto frontiers. The westward relocation of Poland became part of the agreed approach of the Potsdam conference.

In the west of Poland, this left large numbers of German speaking people who found that their homes were now in Poland. In reality the population of military age German males was already badly depleted by losses on the Russian front, and knowledge of the approach of the Red Army from the east, together with the breakdown in relations between ethnic Germans and other communities as the war drew to its end, had already led many Germans in the east of the country to flee towards the west during 1944 and 1945, so that much property was already abandoned by them and in many cases expropriated on a local basis, giving aspects of the "Bierut Decrees" basically a retrospective character.

== The law on abandoned and deserted property ==
Most of the territory transferred to Poland from the prewar Germany in 1945 came from areas that had been part of the historic state of Prussia and subsequently of Germany, some of them since the partitions of the Polish-Lithuanian Commonwealth. This was the case with most of Pomerania, Silesia and the eastern part of Brandenburg, including major cities in postwar Poland such as Szczecin/Stettin and Wrocław/Breslau. Danzig/Gdańsk was annexed by the Kingdom of Prussia in the second partition of Poland of 1793, and was a free city for about 20 years before World War II. New laws were enacted by the Provisional Government of National Unity regarding German speaking people who were living within Poland’s new frontiers.

=== Decrees of Provisional Government of National Unity ===
Following the shifting of borders between the two countries, on 6 May 1945 the new Polish general law on abandoned and deserted property was signed, affecting the Germans in several paragraphs. The law specified two categories of assets distinct from each other. The property, which before the invasion of Poland was owned by the Germans as well as by the defectors from Poland living in Germany (the Volksdeutsche), was classified as abandoned. Meanwhile, the assets requisitioned and/or acquired by the Germans after the invasion were classified as deserted when the new laws came into effect. The law was signed by Bolesław Bierut, Edward Osóbka-Morawski, Hilary Minc and four other ministers. The subsequent decree of 8 March 1946 on formerly German property went a step further and nationalized all German assets, with the exception of property taken over by the Soviet Union already. By the same token, all laws enacted by the German occupation administration were declared legally void and invalid. The law was signed by Bolesław Bierut, Edward Osóbka-Morawski, and twenty ministers. As a result of the new law, the German nationals who found themselves residing in Poland without active citizenship became transients; therefore, there was no need for additional law to exclude them from Poland.

=== Exclusion of hostile elements from the Polish state ===
The decree and law of 1945 along with the further decree of 13 September 1946 on the exclusion of hostile elements from the Polish state concerned the ethnic German minority who had lived in Poland as defined by the frontiers agreed between 1923 and 1939. In these cases the expulsion of the German portion of the population and the expropriation of their property with impunity was effected legally.

== Principal enactments ==
28 February 1945 decree concerning the exclusion of elements hostile to the Polish state

Art. 6 (1) Citizens of the Polish state who after 31 August 1939 were forced by the occupiers to become Germans in the area of Poland or of the formerly free city of Danzig .... or were included in a privileged category by the occupiers may make an application for rehabilitation....

Art.7 (1) Those who can demonstrate that they were forced against their will to be included [in the Germans' privileged category] and who can demonstrate by their conduct their Polishness can be recognized as rehabilitated...

Art. 18 (1) In areas of the Polish republic forcibly incorporated into the German Empire or in the area of the formerly free city of Danzig, assets found are subject to seizure and confiscation from:

a) Those belonging to the German state (German citizens),
b) People of German Nationality regardless of whether or not they hold a German passport,
c) Polish citizens whom the authorities under the German occupation placed in .... privileged categories,
d) Polish citizens who ... [under the occupation] declared themselves, whether or not truthfully, to be of German nationality or descent, and thereby enjoyed special rights and privileges...

6 May 1945 amendment concerning the exclusion of elements hostile to the Polish state

Art. 21 (1) [identical with Art. 18 (1) of the Decree of 28 February 1945 (above)]

6 May 1945 law concerning abandoned assets

Art. 1 § 1: Abandoned assets for the purposes of this law are any assets, whether movable or immovable, that following the war which began on 1 September 1939 no longer are to be found in the possession of their owners..

Art. 2 § 1: Any movable or immovable asset the constitutes the property or possession of the German state...or the asset of a German national or of persons who switched sides in favour of the enemy, is an abandoned asset for the purposes of this law.

Art. 14 § 1: At the application of the departmental minister, the office provisional state administration shall transfer to the minister in question management control of a specified business undertaking.

Art. 38: The state or the person identified in Art. 14 [above] or the appropriately empowered institution shall received property rights over the assets transferred after five years following the end of the calendar year in which the war ends ...

3 January 1946 nationalisation law, concerning the acquisition into state ownership of the principal branches of the national economy

Art. 2 (1): Property is transferred into the ownership of the state without compensation in respect of businesses involved in industry, trade, mining, transport and trade:

a) from the German state and the formerly free city of Danzig,
b) from nationals of the German state or of the formerly free city of Danzig ..., and
c) from businesses controlled, through nationals of the German state or of the formerly free city of Danzig, by the German authorities ...

8 March 1946 decree concerning abandoned and formerly German assets

Art. 2.1: By force of law, ownership of assets transfers into the ownership of the state:

a) from the German state and the formerly free city of Danzig,
b) from nationals of the German state or of the formerly free city of Danzig, with the exception of persons of Polish nationality or of other post-German nationality,
c) from German or Danzig legal persons, except where legal personality is created publicly under [Polish national] the law, and
d) from businesses controlled, through nationals of the German state or of the formerly free city of Danzig, by the German authorities ...

Art. 2.4: Assets, according to public law, of German and Danzig legal persons, pass by force of law into the ownership of the corresponding Polish legal persons.

Art. 3.2: All asset transfers under the provisions 2.1 and 2.4 (above), and of abandoned assets to the state shall be null and void where their execution would block the operation of a regional Insolvency Office ...

24 March 1946 regulation for identification of formerly German-owned movable assets

In order to make possible the acquisition of property comprising formerly German owned movable assets, I instruct that these movable assets in the recovered regions [i.e. areas of Poland previously in Germany] be listed:

§1: The object of the listing concerns formerly German owned movable assets that are located:

a) in private living accommodation

b) in service accommodation permitted to treat by employees as private accommodation

c) in businesses involved in trade, commerce and craft-based activity, where operated as private businesses ...

In accommodation which is still jointly used by Germans and Poles, all movable assets shall be treated as owned by the Poles...

§ 10: A standard-form inventory schedule shall be used. Essentially all the movable assets to hand in the affected living places are to be included. In particular ....

1. All items of furniture without exception..., 2. Wall mounted and standing clocks, 3. ceiling and table lamps, 4. pianos and other musical instruments, 5. Carpets, rugs and tapestries, 6. Pictures and sculptures (excluding mass-produced items), 7. household machines of significant value (electric and gas fridges, ovens, sewing machines, vacuum cleaners...), 8. Typewriters and calculators

== See also ==
- Nationalization in Poland
