= Bolesław Bierut =

Polish politician (1892–1956)

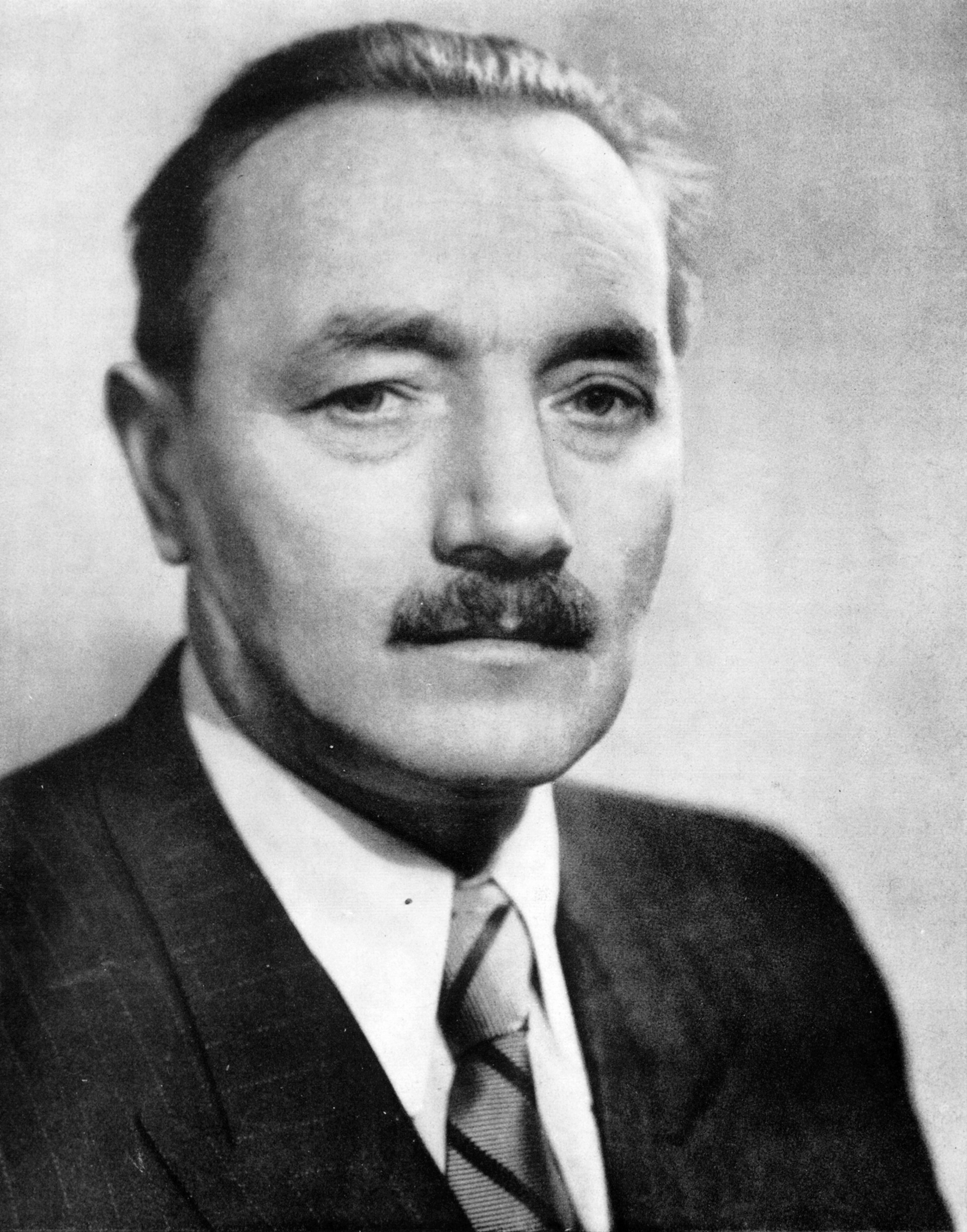
- Bierut in 1950

President of Poland
- In office 5 February 1947 – 20 November 1952 Serving with Władysław Raczkiewicz and August Zaleski (in-exile)
- Prime Minister: Józef Cyrankiewicz
- Preceded by: Władysław Kowalski (Acting)
- Succeeded by: Office abolished Aleksander Zawadzki as Chairman of the Council of State

General Secretary of the Polish United Workers' Party^{[a]}
- In office 22 December 1948 – 12 March 1956
- President: Himself (until 1952)
- Prime Minister: Józef Cyrankiewicz
- Chairman: Aleksander Zawadzki
- Preceded by: Władysław Gomułka as Secretary of the Polish Workers' Party
- Succeeded by: Edward Ochab as First Secretary
Additional positions
President of the State National Council
In office 31 December 1943 – 4 February 1947
Prime Minister	Edward Osóbka-Morawski
President in-exile	Władysław Raczkiewicz
Preceded by	Władysław Raczkiewicz as President-in-exile
Succeeded by	Franciszek Trąbalski (Acting President)
Prime Minister of Poland
In office 21 November 1952 – 18 March 1954
Chairman	Aleksander Zawadzki
First Secretary	Himself
Counterpats in-exile	Roman Odzierzyński; Jerzy Hryniewski
Deputy	Józef Cyrankiewicz; Władysław Dworakowski; Tadeusz Gede; Piotr Jaroszewicz; Stefan Jędrychowski; Hilary Minc; Zenon Nowak; Konstanty Rokossowski
Preceded by	Józef Cyrankiewicz
Succeeded by	Józef Cyrankiewicz

Personal details
- Born: 18 April 1892 Rury, Lublin, Congress Poland, Russian Empire
- Died: 12 March 1956 (aged 63) Moscow, Soviet Union
- Party: PZPR
- Other political affiliations: PPS–L (1910–1918); KPP (1918–1938); PPR (1942–1948)
- Spouse: Janina Górzyńska-Bierut (1890–1985)
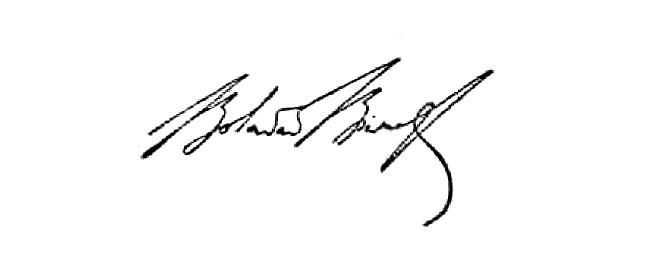
- Signature
- De facto leader of the PPR: ← Berman (1947); Ochab →
- a. Polish Workers' Party to 22 December 1948.

Bolesław Bierut (Polish: [bɔˈlɛswaf ˈbʲɛrut]; 18 April 1892 – 12 March 1956) was a Polish communist activist and politician who was the leader of communist-ruled Poland from 1948 until 1956. He was President of the State National Council from 1944 to 1947, President of Poland from 1947 to 1952, General Secretary of the Central Committee of the Polish United Workers' Party from 1948 to 1956, and Prime Minister of Poland from 1952 to 1954. Bierut is believed to have worked as an NKVD informant or agent prior to 1945, although his relationship with the Soviet agency has been a subject of debate among historians. As communist leader, he implemented aspects of the Stalinist system in Poland. Together with Władysław Gomułka, his main rival, Bierut is chiefly responsible for the historic changes that Poland underwent in the aftermath of World War II. Unlike any of his communist successors, Bierut led Poland until his death.

Born in Congress Poland on the outskirts of Lublin, Bierut was employed in various trades from the age of fourteen, but obtained further education through self-study. He joined the Polish Socialist Party in 1912. Later, he became a member of the Communist Party of Poland and spent some years in the Soviet Union. He was sentenced to a prison term in 1935 for conducting illegal labour activity in Poland by the anti-communist Sanation government and was later released in 1938. During World War II, Bierut was an activist of the newly founded Polish Workers' Party (PPR) and subsequently the chairman of the State National Council (KRN), established by the PPR. Trusted by Joseph Stalin, Bierut participated in the Potsdam Conference, where he successfully lobbied for the establishment of Poland's western border at the Oder–Neisse line.

After the 1947 Polish legislative election, marked by electoral fraud, Bierut was made the first post-war President of Poland. In 1952, the new Constitution of the Polish People's Republic (until then known as the Republic of Poland) abolished the position of president and a Marxist–Leninist government was officially imposed. During his tenure, Bierut rebuilt his country after the World War II, undertook major public works (including roads, monuments, and infrastructure), maintained Poland's foreign relations with other Eastern Bloc countries, and promoted education, the arts, free healthcare, Socialist Realism, the cooperative movement, as well as literacy and anti-clerical campaigns.

As Poland's de facto leader, he resided in the Belweder Palace and headed the Polish United Workers' Party from the party headquarters at New World Street in central Warsaw, known as Dom Partii. He was also the chief proponent for the reconstruction of Warsaw (rebuilding of the historic district) and the erection of the Palace of Culture and Science. Bierut died of a heart attack on 12 March 1956 in Moscow, after attending the 20th Congress of the Communist Party of the Soviet Union. His death was sudden, and many theories arose questioning the circumstances in which he died. His body was brought back to Poland and buried with honours in a monumental tomb at the Powązki Military Cemetery.

== Career ==
=== Youth and early career ===
Bierut was born in Rury, Congress Poland (then part of the Russian Empire), now a part of Lublin, to Wojciech and Marianna Salomea (Wolska) Bierut, peasants from the Tarnobrzeg area, the youngest of their six children. In 1900, he attended an elementary school in Lublin. In 1905, he was removed from the school for instigating anti-Russian protests. From the age of fourteen, he was employed in various trades, but obtained further education through self-study. Influenced by the leftist intellectual Jan Hempel, who in 1910 arrived in Lublin, before World War I, Bierut joined the Polish Socialist Party – Left (PPS – Lewica).

From 1915, Bierut was active in the cooperative movement. In 1916, he became trade manager of the Lublin Food Cooperative, and from 1918 was its top leader, declaring the cooperative's "class-socialist" character. During World War I, he stayed at times at Hempel's apartment in Warsaw and took trade and cooperative courses at the Warsaw School of Economics. In Warsaw, he established contacts with Maria Koszutska and in December 1918 some form of association with the newly created Communist Workers' Party of Poland (KPRP), from which, according to his later testimony, he withdrew in fall 1919. Bierut kept assuming ever higher offices in the cooperative movement. In 1919, he and Hempel went to Prague, where they represented the Polish cooperatives at the congress of their Czechoslovak counterparts. Bierut's increasingly radical views, however, eventually hindered his cooperative career and caused his departure from the leadership of the movement, beginning in 1921. From 1921, he officially functioned as a member of the KPRP.

In July 1921, Bierut married Janina Górzyńska, a preschool teacher who had helped him a great deal when his illegal activities forced him to hide from the police. They were married by a priest at the Lublin Cathedral, even though the priest, according to Janina, excused them from the confession requirement. In February 1923, their daughter Krystyna was born, followed by their son Jan in January 1925.

=== Communist Party activism until 1939 ===
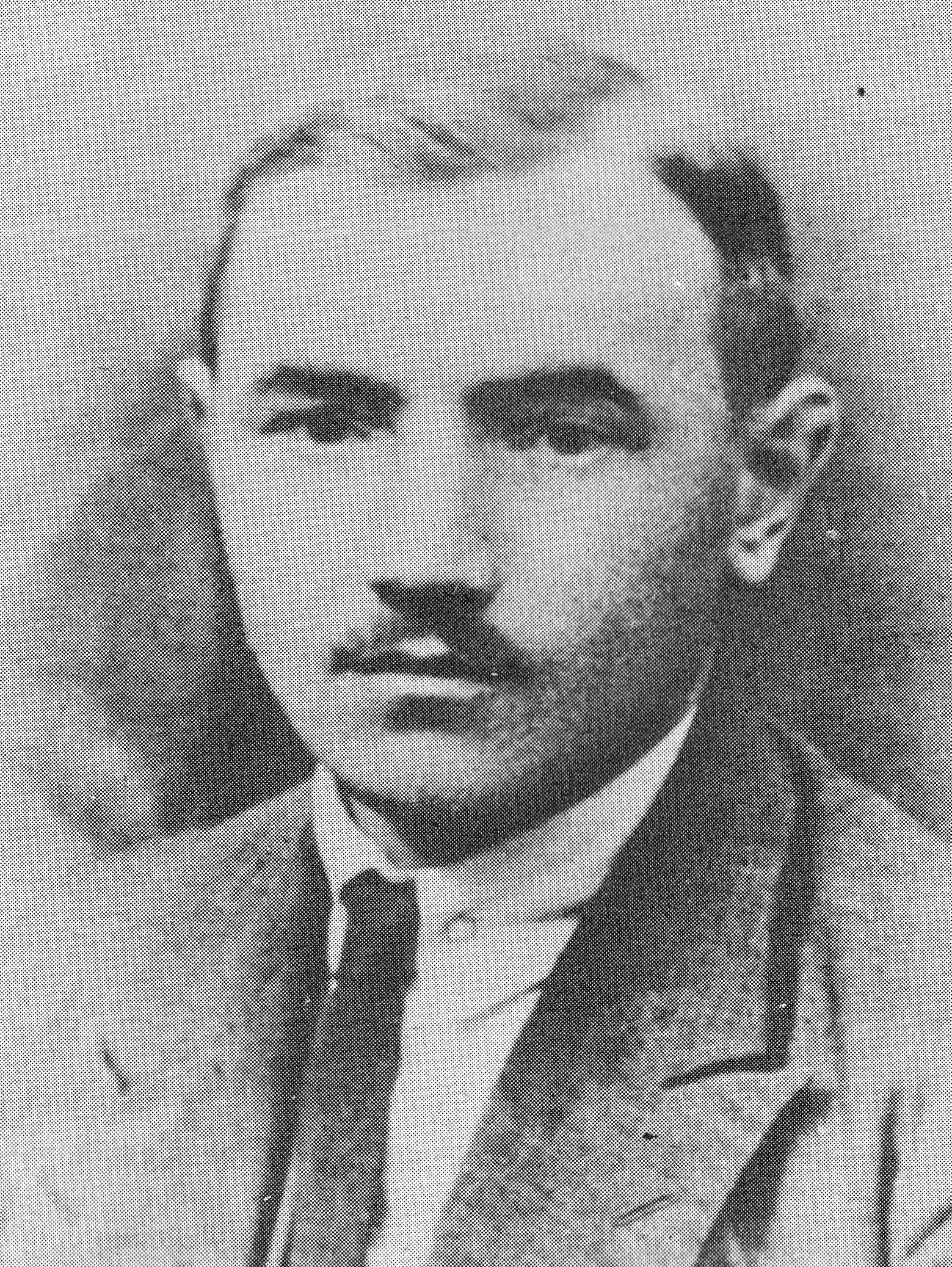
Bierut in around 1927

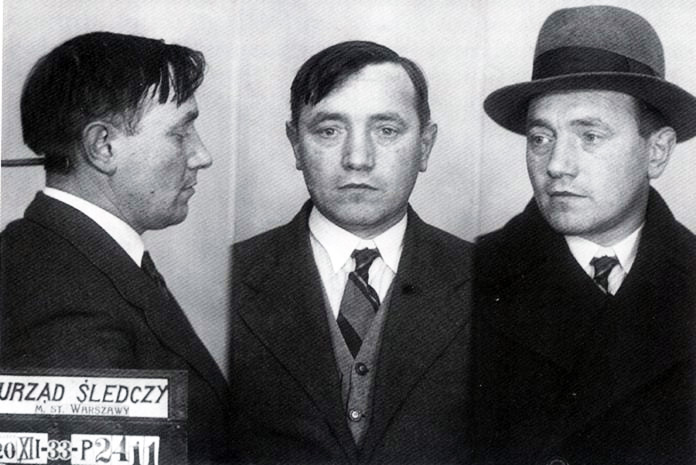
Bolesław Bierut in 1933, after his arrest by Polish Police

In 1922–1925, Bierut was a member of the Cooperative Department of the KPRP Central Committee. He worked as an accountant and was active in Warsaw at the Polish Association of Freethinkers. In August 1923, he was sent for party work in the Dąbrowa Basin, to manage the Workers' Food Cooperative. He lived in Sosnowiec, where he brought his wife and daughter and where he experienced the first of his many arrests. Detained repeatedly in various parts of the country, in October 1924, he moved to Warsaw. He had become a full-time conspiratorial party activist and, in 1925, was a member of the Temporary Secretariat of the Central Committee and then the head of the Cooperative Department there.

Already trusted by the Soviets and knowing the Russian language well, from October 1925 to June 1926, Bierut was in the Moscow area, sent there for training at the secret school of the Communist International.

Arrested in Warsaw in January 1927, he was released on 30 April, based on personal assurances issued on his behalf by Stanisław Szwalbe and Zygmunt Zaremba. During the Fourth Congress of the Communist Party of Poland (KPP, the new name of the KPRP), which took place from 22 May to 9 August 1927, Bierut became a member of the Temporary Secretariat of the Central Committee again. In November, the party sent him to the International Lenin School in Moscow. He received positive evaluations there, except for not being entirely free of ideological right-wing errors, characteristic, in the school's opinion, of the Polish communist party.

In 1930–1931, Bierut was sent by the Comintern to Austria, Czechoslovakia and Bulgaria. Many details of his activities are not reliably known, but from 1 October 1930, he was an instructor at the executive committee of the Comintern. He later claimed having lived in Moscow in 1927–32, except for a nine-month period in 1931, and having been enrolled at the Lenin School until 1930. Jerzy Eisler wrote: "[...] in light of the Soviet archival materials, in 1927–32 Bierut was a member of the Communist Party of the Soviet Union (Bolsheviks), with his party seniority counted from 1921, the moment he formally joined the Polish communist party." In Moscow he met Małgorzata Fornalska, a KPP activist. They became romantically involved and had a daughter, named Aleksandra, born in June 1932. Soon afterwards, Bierut left for Poland, leaving in Moscow for the time being also his legal family, whom he had brought there.

For several months, Bierut was the district secretary of the KPP organisation in Łódź. After the regional organisation was demolished by arrests in 1933, he became secretary of the Central Committee of the Polish section of the International Red Aid. On 18 December 1933, Bierut was arrested and in 1935 sentenced to seven years in prison. In 1936, while imprisoned, he was excluded in absentia from the KPP for "unworthy of a communist behaviour during the investigation and the court trial". The decision was invalidated and reversed by the Comintern on 7 September 1940 (even though the KPP by that time no longer existed). Bierut was found to have been a member of the moderate "majority" faction of the KPP, and the factional infighting in which he participated was determined not to amount to acting against the party.

He was released from prison on 20 December 1938, based on an earlier amnesty. He lived with his wife and children and worked in Warsaw cooperatives until the outbreak of war. The "Sanation" prison may have saved his life: while he was incarcerated, the KPP was disbanded by the Comintern and most of its leaders murdered in Stalin's purges.

=== In the Soviet Union ===
On 1 September 1939, Nazi Germany attacked Poland. On 6 September, the Polish military command issued a radio appeal for all able-bodied men to head east;

Bierut left Warsaw for Lublin, from where he proceeded to Kovel. Eastern Poland was soon occupied by the Red Army and Bierut was about to spend a part of World War II in the Soviet Union. From early October, he was employed by the Soviets in political capacities, including vice-chairmanship of a regional election commission before the Elections to the People's Assemblies of Western Ukraine and Western Belorussia. The two assemblies, once established, voted for the incorporation of the previously Polish territories into the respective Soviet republics.

Bierut spent the rest of 1939, 1940 and the first part of 1941 in the Soviet Union, in Kiev and Moscow, working, making efforts to sanitise his record as a communist and searching for Fornalska, whom he met in Moscow in July 1940 and again in May 1941 in Białystok, where she had moved with Aleksandra. The mother and daughter were evacuated to Yershov in the Soviet Union after the June 1941 outbreak of the Soviet-German war, but Bierut ended up in Minsk.^{[a]} From November 1941, he was employed there by the German occupation authorities as a manager in the trade and food distribution department of the city government. In the summer of 1943, Bierut arrived in Nazi-occupied Poland, likely dispatched there as a trusted Soviet operative. He came to join the leadership of the Polish Workers' Party (PPR), a new communist party founded in January 1942. He may have been recommended for the job by Fornalska; parachuted into the General Government in the spring of 1942, she was in charge of the PPR's radio communications with Moscow. Bierut became a member of the party Secretariat on 23 November 1943.

While there are many accounts and stories relating to Bierut during the 1939–1943 period, not much is known with certainty about his activities and the accounts are often speculative or amount to hearsay.

=== In occupied Poland from 1943 ===
Upon his arrival in Warsaw, Bierut became a member of the Central Committee of the PPR, which comprised several individuals. The Secretariat had three members: General Secretary Paweł Finder, Franciszek Jóźwiak and Władysław Gomułka, whom Bierut did not know, but who quickly became his principal rival. Bierut lost his first confrontation over the management of Trybuna Wolności ("The Tribune of Freedom"), the party's press organ.

In a major blow to the re-emergent Polish communist party, Finder and Fornalska were arrested by the Gestapo on 14 November 1943. They were executed in July 1944. They were the only people with the knowledge of radio codes needed to communicate with Moscow and such communications were indeed interrupted for several months. On 23 November 1943, the PPR chose Gomułka as its general secretary.

On 31 December 1943, Bierut assumed an important office: chairmanship of the State National Council (Krajowa Rada Narodowa, KRN), a communist-led body established by Gomułka and the PPR. The KRN was declared to be a wartime parliament of Poland and some splinter socialist and agrarian activists were co-opted. Starting with the KRN post, with Gomułka and others, Bierut would play a leading role in the establishment of communist Poland.

In May 1944, the KRN delegation flew into Moscow. They were officially received at the Kremlin by Joseph Stalin; supremacy of the KRN was recognised by the Union of Polish Patriots, which operated in the Soviet Union under communist leadership.

In June 1944, Bierut wrote a letter, meant for the Soviet leadership and addressed to Georgi Dimitrov in Moscow. He accused his Polish communist rival Gomułka of dictatorial tendencies and numerous offences contrary to Marxist–Leninist orthodoxy; if taken seriously, the accusations could have cost Gomułka his life, but they were not, and Gomułka did not find out about the letter until 1948, when it was used against him in Poland.

In July 1944, the Polish Committee of National Liberation (PKWN) was established in liberated Lublin province. Just before the outbreak of the Warsaw Uprising, on 31 July 1944, Bierut came to Świder. The next day, he crossed the front line and arrived in Lublin, the seat of the PKWN.

=== In Soviet-dominated Poland ===
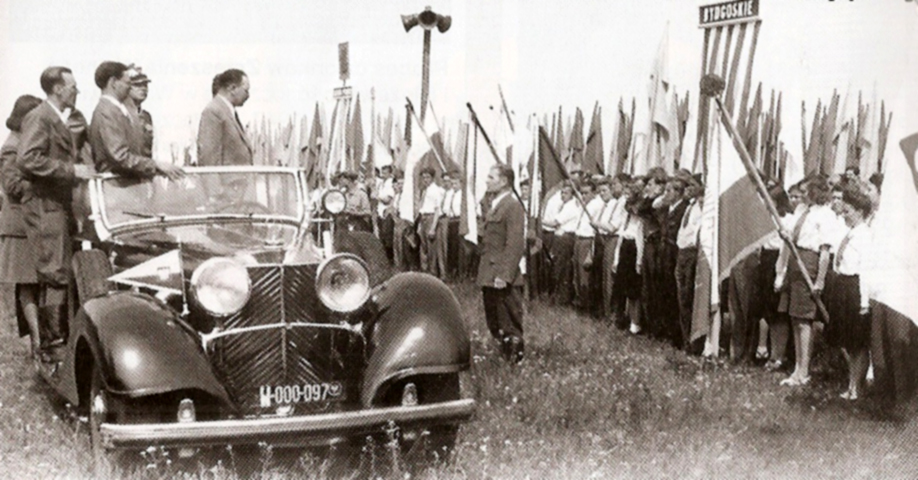
Bolesław Bierut inspecting members of the Union of Polish Youth, 1946

Continuing as the KRN president, from August 1944, Bierut was secretly a member of the newly created Politburo of the PPR; he was officially presented to the public as a nonpartisan politician.

After the outbreak of the Warsaw Uprising, Bierut arrived in Moscow. On 6–7 August 1944, together with Wanda Wasilewska and Michał Rola-Żymierski, he conducted negotiations with Prime Minister Stanisław Mikołajczyk of the Polish government-in-exile. Mikołajczyk refused their offer of the job of prime minister in a coalition government, which otherwise would be dominated by the communists. Bierut's daughter, Krystyna, participated in the uprising as a soldier of Armia Ludowa and was gravely wounded.

A KRN and PKWN delegation, led by Bierut, was summoned to Moscow, where it stayed from 28 September to 3 October. Stalin, assisted by Wasilewska, had two meetings with the leaders from Poland, during which he lectured them on a number of issues, but was especially displeased by the lack of progress in implementing the land reform decree passed by the PKWN on 6 September. Stalin urged them to proceed forcefully with the agrarian revolution and to eliminate the great land owners class without further delay or undue legal concerns; Bierut felt that the remarks were addressed to him in particular.

On 12 October, the anniversary of the Battle of Lenino, the KRN for the first time deliberated in Lublin. The proceedings were interrupted to allow the deputies (including Bierut), together with officials of the PKWN and Nikolai Bulganin representing the Soviet Union, to participate in a field mass celebrated for the occasion and in the military parade that followed. Such participation in religious ceremonies by leading communist politicians continued for a while; it was one of the manifestations of the officially proclaimed, after the war, democratic and pluralistic policies, which included preservation of religious freedoms. Marshal Rola-Żymierski recalled kneeling together with Bierut before the altar at another field mass in May 1946, on the first anniversary of World War II victory. In conversations with Stanisław Łukasiewicz, his press secretary, Bierut expressed his support for moderate and liberal policies. His personal views were anti-clerical and he thought the reform proposals put forward by Mikołajczyk's Polish People's Party (PSL), the legally existing opposition, would be abandoned in the event of PSL victory.

A military department of the PPR Central Committee was created on 31 October 1944 and included Bierut and Gomułka, in addition to three generals. Its goal was to politicise the armed forces, currently fighting the war, and to establish a politically reliable officer corps. According to Eisler, Bierut and Gomułka are both responsible for the post-war persecution of many former Home Army soldiers and other groups and individuals. The terror policies, particularly brutal in the 1944–48 period, were directed against declared opponents of the regime, including the legally functioning PSL, and had not yet involved society as a whole.

In February 1945, the Yalta Conference took place in Crimea. At that time, Bierut, together with the PPR leadership and government departments, moved to the capital city of Warsaw. The city was in ruins and its rebuilding and expansion became a major concern and preoccupation for Bierut during the years that followed.

In June 1945, the Provisional Government of National Unity was established in Moscow. In July, Bierut and other Polish leaders participated in the Potsdam Conference, where, together with Stalin, they successfully lobbied for the establishment of Poland's western border at the Oder–Neisse line. The Polish administration in the formerly German lands was to continue until the final delimitation of the frontier in the (future) peace settlement. Poland's newly acquired "Recovered Territories" had thus reached their maximum attainable size.

=== Referendum and election, Bierut's presidency ===
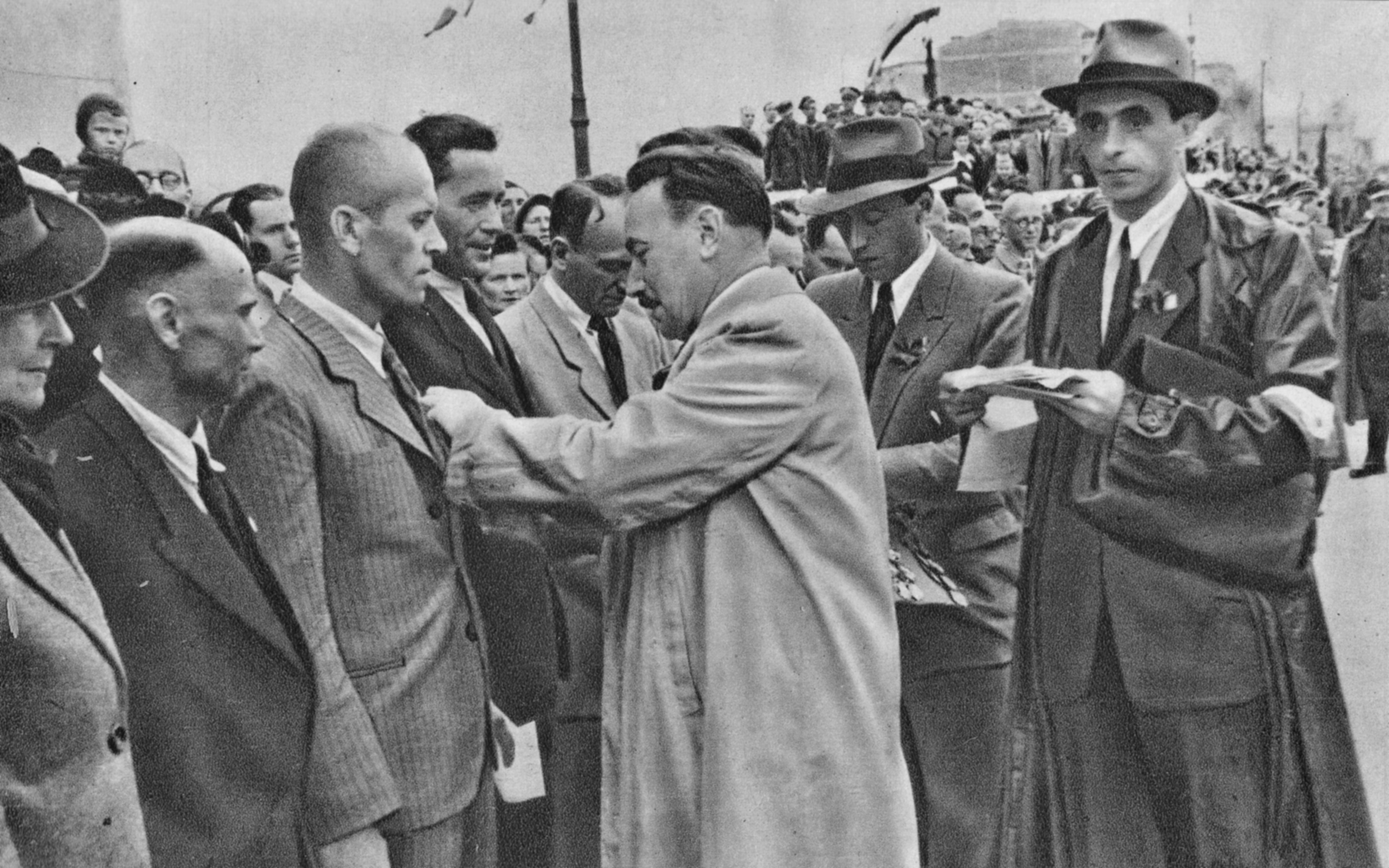
Bierut decorating the most productive workers on the rebuilt Poniatowski Bridge in Warsaw, 1946

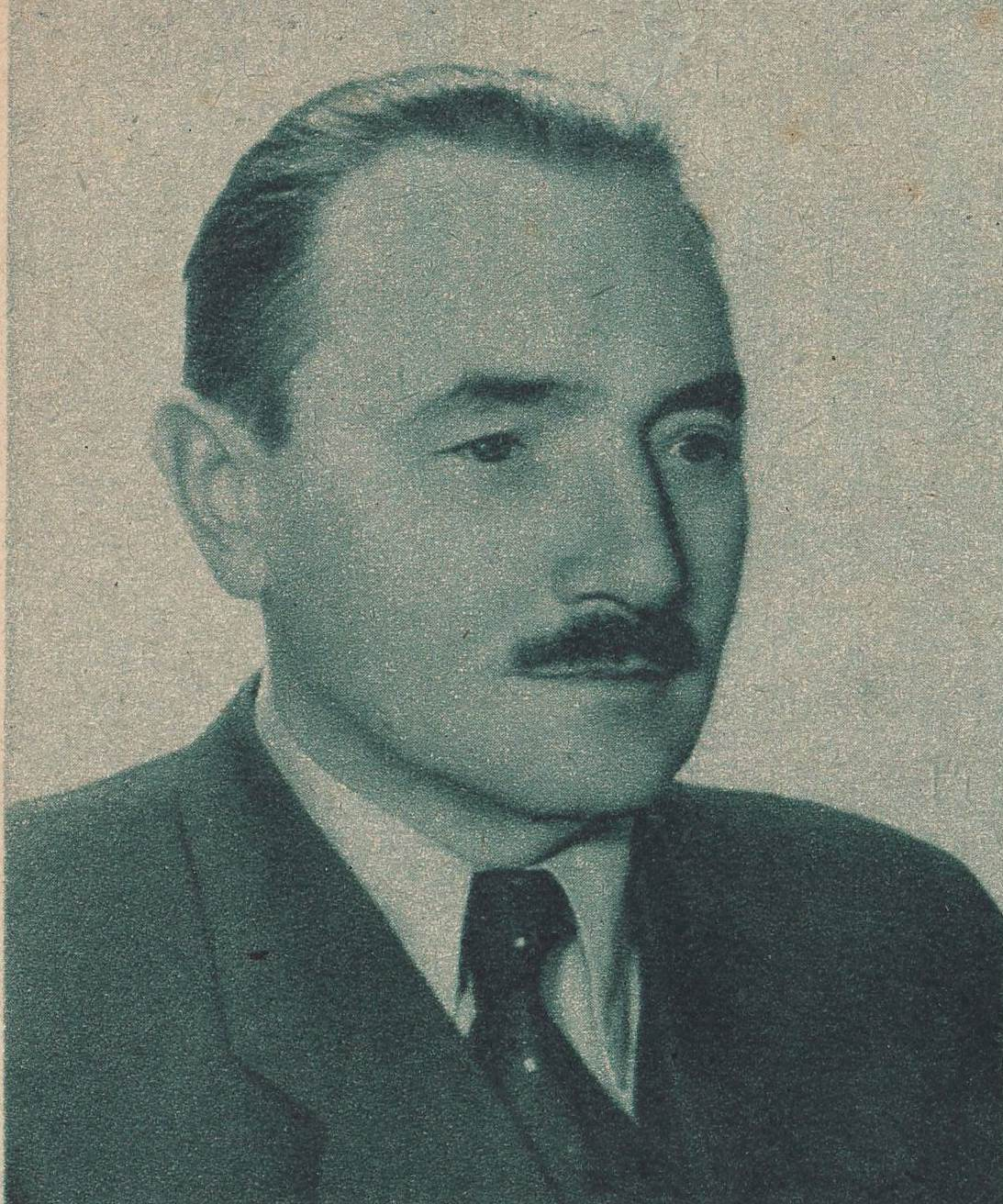
Bierut in 1948

On 30 June 1946, the Polish people's referendum took place. It was done in preparation for the Yalta-mandated national elections; affirmative answers to the three questions given were supposed to demonstrate public support for the issues promoted by the communists. The results were falsified.

On 22 September 1946, the KRN passed the electoral rules and in November set the date; the delayed legislative elections were held on 19 January 1947. The PPR-led coalition, running as the Democratic Bloc, was opposed by Mikołajczyk's PSL.

Mikołajczyk's Peasant Party, although it also had progressive overtones, had grown to be publicly associated with the traditional Polish right, which had engaged in antisemitic and anti-communist repressions before the war. The government dissolved the explicitly antisemitic right-wing parties still active after the war, but many of their supporters joined PSL since it was the only remaining legal opposition. The long-standing trope of the "Judeo-Bolshevik", or Żydokomuna, was used by the far-right in anti-communist propaganda to cast Polish communism as a plot to control Poland by Russian Jews.

The government also engaged in heavy interference with the election. Due to the electoral rules passed in September, 1 million people, or about 8% of the electorate, were disqualified on the grounds that they collaborated with the German Nazis during the occupation or with underground fascist organisations still active in the country. Additionally, the Peasant Party lists in 10 of the 52 districts were disqualified on the basis that they were composed of rightists. In places where Peasant Party observers were not allowed to oversee the election process, results were directly falsified. Lastly, peasant participation was limited by the fact that the elections were set in January, when most rural roads were covered in snow. The falsified results saw the Democratic Bloc receiving 80.1% of the vote, and Mikołajczyk only getting 10.3%. The PSL was practically eliminated as the legal opposition.

The newly elected Sejm convened on 4 February 1947 and on the following day, it elected Bierut President of the Republic of Poland. The installation ceremony was done in a traditional format and ended with the new president uttering the words "so help me God".

On 16 November 1947, during the opening ceremony of the Polish Radio broadcasting station in Wrocław, President Bierut made a speech entitled For the dissemination of culture. "The artistic and cultural creative process should reflect the great breakthrough that the nation is experiencing. It should, but so far it isn't", he said. Bierut called for greater centralisation and planning in culture and art, which, according to him, should form, educate and engross society. The speech was a harbinger of the upcoming norm of socialist realism in Poland.

Sometimes, Bierut on his own undertook special interventions with Stalin. He repeatedly and at different times asked Stalin and Lavrentiy Beria about the whereabouts of the missing Polish communists (former members of the disbanded KPP), many of whom were murdered in the Great Purge in the 1930s, but others may have survived. He also kept looking for the missing family of Fornalska. While Stalin and Beria discouraged and ridiculed Bierut's efforts, in some cases, his exertions brought positive results. Besides the communists, mostly surviving women, Bierut was able to bring back to Poland many other Poles, including former Home Army soldiers exiled in the Soviet Union.

Bierut was a gallant man, well-liked by women. His wife, Janina, did not live with him and was not known to many of his associates. She occasionally visited him in his offices and seemed intimidated by the surroundings and her husband's position. On the other hand, his son and two daughters had seen Bierut frequently; they spent holidays and vacations with him, and he appeared to genuinely enjoy their company. Bierut's actual female partner, after Fornalska's arrest, was Wanda Górska. She worked as his secretary and in other capacities, controlled access to him and visitors often thought of her as Bierut's wife.

=== Top leader of Stalinist Poland ===
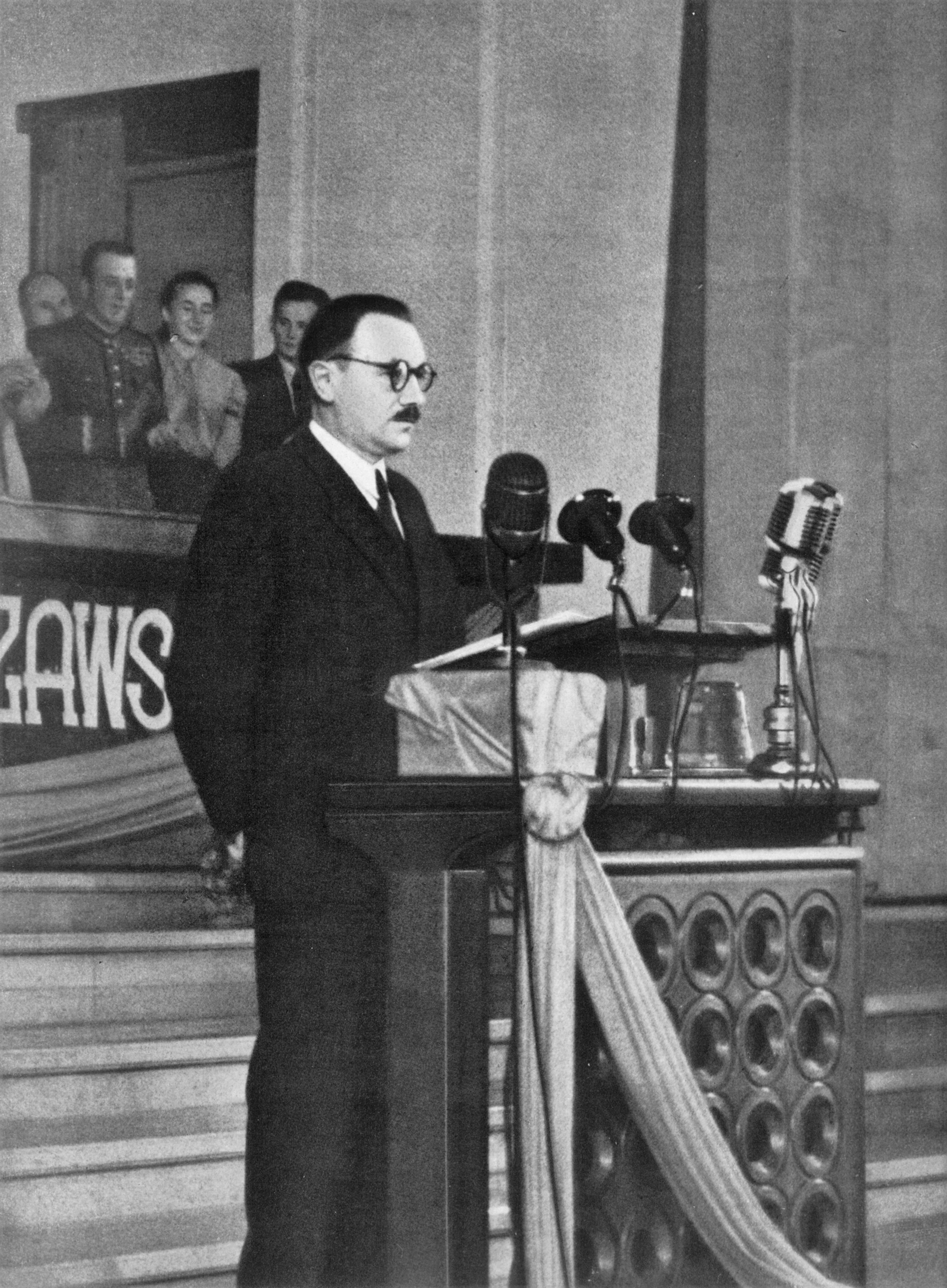
Bolesław Bierut, President of Poland and General Secretary of the PZPR, in 1949

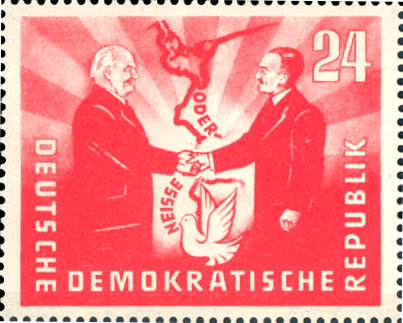
1951 East German stamp commemorative of the Treaty of Zgorzelec, which established the Oder–Neisse line as a "border of peace"; presidents Wilhelm Pieck (GDR) and Bolesław Bierut are featured shaking hands over the border.

Gomułka, general secretary of the PPR (and until that time the principal figure in post-war Polish communist establishment), was accused of a "right-wing nationalistic deviation" and removed from his position during a plenary meeting of the Central Committee in August 1948. The move was Stalin-orchestrated and Stalin's choice to fill the vacated job was President Bierut, who had thus become both the top party leader and top state official.

The historic PPS was practically taken over by the PPR at the Unification Congress, held in Warsaw in December 1948. The resulting "Marxist–Leninist" Polish United Workers' Party (PZPR) was nearly synonymous with the state and Bierut became its first general secretary. The Three-Year Plan of post-war rebuilding and economic consolidation ended in 1949 and was followed by the Six-Year Plan, which intensified the industrialisation process and brought extensive urbanisation of Poland.

In November 1949, Bierut asked the Soviet government to make available Marshal Konstantin Rokossovsky, a Polish-Soviet politician and famous World War II commander, for service in the government of Poland. Rokossovsky subsequently became a Marshal of Poland and Minister of National Defense.

In early August 1951, Bierut had his main rival, Gomułka, arrested. Gomułka, though imprisoned, refused to cooperate with his accusers and displayed a remarkable ability to defend himself, while Bierut's people bungled the prosecution. According to Edward Ochab, though, Stalin and Beria ordered the arrest and trial of Gomułka, while Bierut and Jakub Berman tried to protect him and caused delays in the proceedings. Informal political reforms, slow to take hold after Stalin's death, eventually materialised, and in December 1954, Gomułka was released.

During the lifetime of Stalin, Bierut was strictly subservient to the Soviet leader. Bierut routinely received instructions from Stalin over the telephone or was summoned to Moscow for consultations. Bierut still had far more power in Poland than any of his successors as First Secretary of the PZPR. He ruled jointly with his two closest associates, Berman and Hilary Minc. Security issues he also consulted with Stanisław Radkiewicz, head of the Ministry of Public Security.

=== Bierut's 60th birthday, constitution of the Polish People's Republic ===
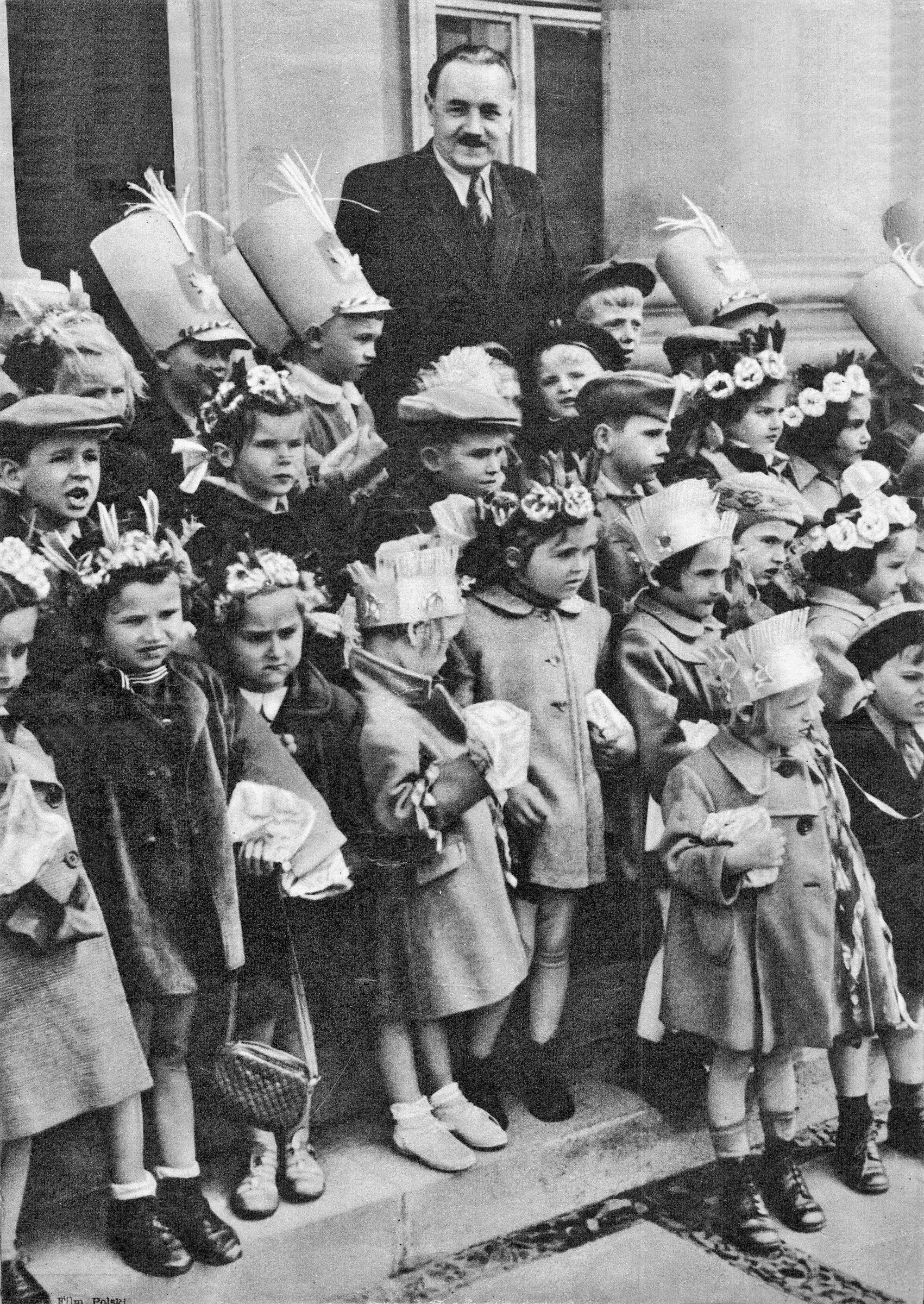
Bierut was often photographed with children, which was meant to contribute to his cult of personality

The apogee of Bierut's cult, promoted by the authorities over a number of years, was the celebration of his sixtieth birthday on 18 April 1952. It included various industrial and other production or accomplishment commitments undertaken by institutions and individuals. The University of Wrocław and some state enterprises were named in his honour. The History Department of the party's Central Committee prepared a special book about Bierut and his life, while Polish poets, including some notable ones, generated a book of poems dedicated to the leader. Many postage stamps dedicated to Bierut were issued.

As the PZPR leadership felt ready to sanction its rule in a fundamental legal document, a new constitution was being worked on. On 26 May 1951, the Sejm passed a statute concerning the preparation and passing of the constitution. The Constitutional Committee, led by Bierut, commenced its deliberations on 19 September. In the fall of 1951, a Russian translation of the draft constitution was examined by Stalin, who inserted dozens of corrections, subsequently implemented in the Polish text by Bierut. The officially proclaimed national public discussion resulted in hundreds of other proposed changes. After all the delays and the necessary extension of the term of the Sejm, the Constitution of the Polish People's Republic was officially proclaimed on 22 July 1952.

The Polish People's Republic (Polska Rzeczpospolita Ludowa) was the new name of the state. The Sejm was designated as the highest national authority; it represented "the working people of towns and villages". The office of the president was eliminated and replaced with the collegial Council of State, elected by the Sejm from its members. The first chairman of the new council was Aleksander Zawadzki. Bierut replaced Józef Cyrankiewicz as prime minister in November 1952. The constitution, amended many times, remained in force until a new Constitution of Poland came into effect in October 1997, in what was then the Republic of Poland.

=== Bierut's last years ===
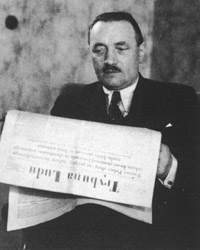
Bierut reading Trybuna Ludu ('The People's Tribune'), the official newspaper of the Polish United Workers' Party

In March 1953, Bierut led the Polish delegation for Stalin's funeral in Moscow.

The regime's relations with the Catholic Church kept deteriorating. The authorities imprisoned Bishop Czesław Kaczmarek and interned Poland's primate, Cardinal Stefan Wyszyński.

In the Soviet Union, changes were initiated by the new leader of the communist party, Nikita Khrushchev. The collective leadership concept, promoted first in the Soviet Union, made its way to other communist countries, including Poland. It meant, among other things, giving top party and state functions to different officials.

The Second Congress of the PZPR deliberated from 10 to 17 March 1954 in Warsaw. Bierut's party chief's title was changed from general secretary to first secretary. Because of the separation of functions requirement, Bierut remained only a party secretary and Józef Cyrankiewicz returned to the post of prime minister. The Six-Year Plan was modified and some of the heavy industrial investment resources were shifted toward the production of consumer articles.

When Khrushchev, a guest at the congress, inquired about the reasons for the continuing imprisonment of Gomułka, Bierut professed his own ignorance on that issue.

=== Death and funeral ===
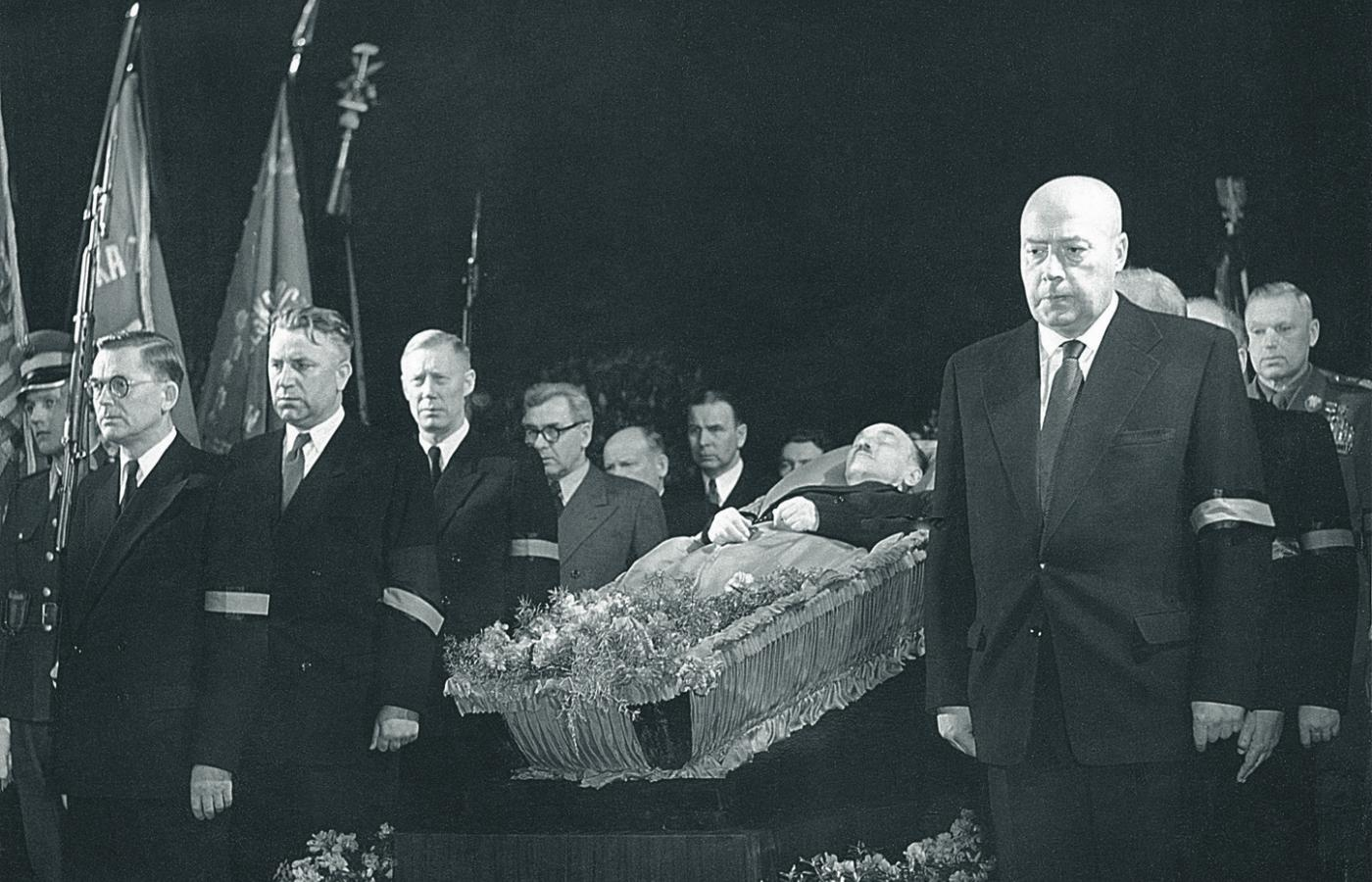
Bierut's funeral bier attended by Józef Cyrankiewicz, Edward Ochab and Aleksander Zawadzki

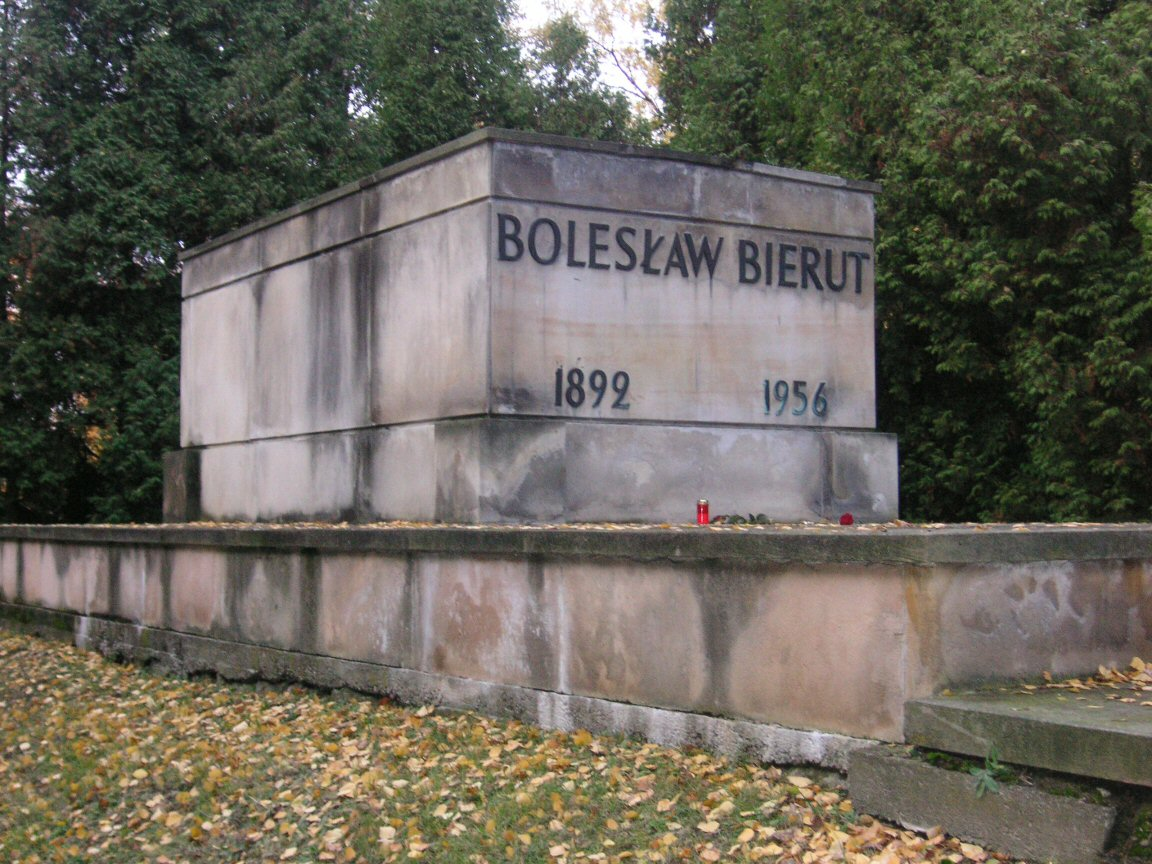
Bierut's tomb at Powązki Military Cemetery

The 20th Congress of the Communist Party of the Soviet Union deliberated on 14–25 February 1956. Afterwards, Bierut did not return to Poland with the rest of the Polish delegation, but remained in Moscow, hospitalised with bad influenza, which turned into pneumonia and heart complications.

On 3 March, during a conference of PZPR activists in Warsaw, Stefan Staszewski and others severely criticised the contemporary party leadership, including the absent Bierut.

Bierut died of a heart attack on 12 March 1956, having read the text of Nikita Khrushchev's "Secret Speech", in which Khrushchev criticised Stalin's cult of personality.

Bierut, however, would not die until sixteen days after that speech and four members of the delegation of Polish students who studied in Moscow, who met him on 25 February 1956, told Eisler that the first secretary showed signs of physical distress already at that time.

The deceased leader was given a splendid funeral in Warsaw. A period of national mourning was declared. Catholic bishops conceded to the demand that church bells ring all over the country on the day of the funeral.

In a radio address on 14 March, Helena Jaworska, chairperson of the board of the Union of Polish Youth, eulogised Bierut on behalf of the Polish youth. She recalled Bierut's war and post-war activities and declared that "the beloved friend of the youth has departed". She spoke of the "great son of the Polish nation" and "a beautiful, loved person".

The funeral, which took place on 16 March, was transmitted by the Polish Radio for many hours. Warsaw residents were given a day off from work to be able to participate. Large crowds of people gathered and joined the funeral procession, which began at the Palace of Culture and Science and proceeded toward the Powązki Military Cemetery, where the burial took place and where, for logistical reasons, only guests and delegations could enter.

== Remembrance in communist and post-communist Poland ==
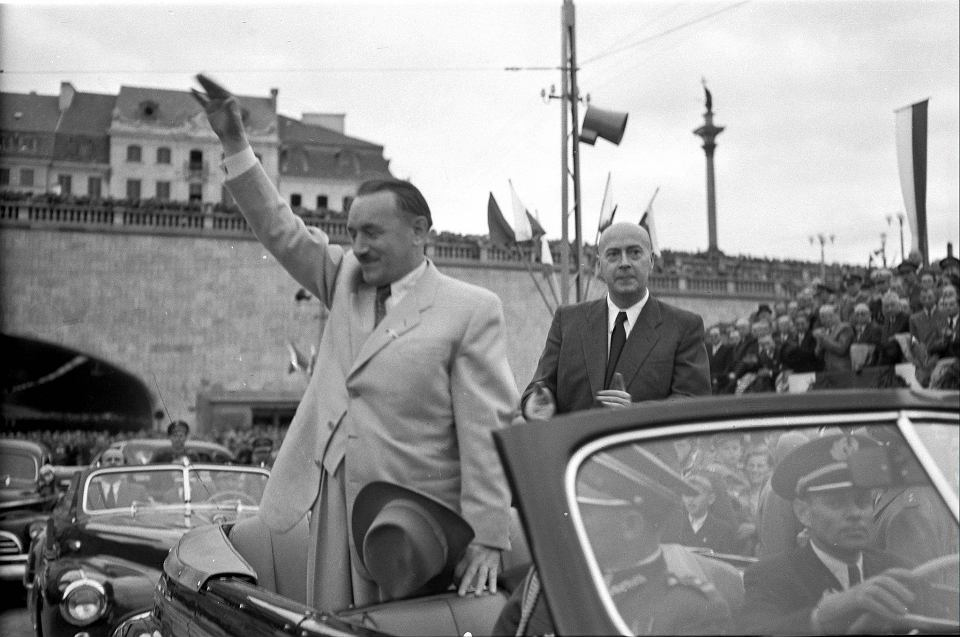
Bolesław Bierut and Józef Cyrankiewicz during the opening of the Warsaw W-Z Route, 2 July 1949

Khrushchev, who participated in Bierut's funeral, stayed in Warsaw for several days and attended the Sixth Plenum of the PZPR Central Committee. On 20 March, Edward Ochab was chosen there as the party's new first secretary. Prime Minister Cyrankiewicz delivered a detailed account of the history of Bierut's illness, going back to the early spring of 1950, when Bierut experienced his first myocardial infarction. The report was not made public.

According to historian Andrzej Garlicki, Bierut died just in time to make possible the political demise of Berman and Minc and the triumphal return of Gomułka. Had Bierut lived much longer, the de-Stalinization process in Poland could have been stalled.

Soon after Bierut's death, on 18 April 1956, a merchant ship newly built in Gdańsk Shipyard was named Bolesław Bierut.

During Gomułka's rule as first secretary (1956–70), the memory of Bierut was marginalised. After 1970, First Secretary Edward Gierek brought Bierut back into public consciousness. Some books about him were published and in July 1979, on the 35th anniversary of communist Poland, Bierut's monument was erected in Lublin. Bierut's legend was sustained and cultivated during the 1970s. Gierek and his team, according to Eisler, idealised Bierut and his period and introduced a soft version of Stalinism, lacking the terror component of the original.

During the brief but turbulent Solidarity period, the University of Wrocław attempted to reclaim its original name, but the Ministry of Higher Education declined to implement the faculty resolution in January 1982.

On 1 June 1987, a factory in Skierniewice was given Bierut's name, which was likely the last such outcome. In 1989, the University of Wrocław got its old name back, Bierut's monument in Lublin was taken down, and soon all mention of Bierut was removed from public space. However, memorials dedicated to countless many public and other figures and groups, judged compromised by their activities or connections with the communist regime, as well as other objects and names, including monuments of Soviet World War II soldiers or Polish Eastern Front soldiers, met the same fate.

Communist historian Zenobiusz Kozik wrote of the "important role of Bierut in the deep social, economic and civilizational processes of those years. Processes that caused the rapid economic development of the country and great cultural advancement of entire groups and social spheres, especially the great masses of young people. (Regardless of the negative results and side effects, especially destroying the value of existing structures and the unconditional breaking of continuity). The civilizational advancement of Poland influenced the judgements regarding Bierut's place in the history of Poland, especially for a certain generation".

Eisler countered this argument by writing of "the brutal and bloody persecution of soldiers of the independence-seeking underground, clandestine murders, fake political trials, and also the falsified referendum of 1946 and the elections of the following year, and finally the Sovietisation of Poland in practically all areas of public life".

Szwalbe related that Bierut tried to persuade him that "every social revolution has to result in victims, including innocent ones. [...] Bierut considered himself a student of Stalin. He found making statements and declarations with the intent of obfuscating reality to be purposeful and justified (like Stalin did), and also the liquidation of the so-called adversaries in the process of the so-called successive stages of the revolution [...]"

According to the historians Eleonora and Bronisław Syzdek, Bierut "brought to mind no associations with a figure of despot or dictator". "He knew how to listen and express himself competently, although formally he completed only five grades of elementary schooling and trade-cooperative courses. The knowledge he possessed, he acquired through self-education". "People from Bierut's immediate surroundings, whom he always treated with proper respect, while keeping the necessary distance in formal relations, to this day have retained a sympathetic view of him and try to defend the former president of People's Poland against negative judgements".

Leon Chajn spoke of Bierut: "Refined, tactful, composed. Not an eagle, but valued intelligence in others. A great patriot,^{[b]} enthusiast of Stalin's concepts but opponent of his methods." Stanisław Łukasiewicz wrote about Bierut: "Always read a lot and wrote a lot, especially in prison. The years spent in prison were for him the period of his university studies."

== Decorations and awards ==
- Order of the Builders of People's Poland
- Order of the Cross of Grunwald (1st class)
- Partisan Cross
- Medal of Victory and Freedom 1945
- Medal for Warsaw 1939–1945

== See also ==
- Bierut Decree
- Bierut Decrees

== Notes ==
a. After his arrival in Minsk, in September 1941, Bierut met Anastasia Kalesnikova, a woman fifteen years his junior and wife of the composer Isaac Luban, who had fled to Moscow, leaving his family in Minsk. Bierut obtained "Aryan" (non-Jewish) documents for the family and moved into their apartment. Reportedly, Bierut and Kalesnikova had a daughter. After the war, Kalesnikova lived in Minsk again and was discreetly supported financially by Bierut. In 1974, suffering from material hardship, she wrote to First Secretary Edward Gierek of the PZPR, introducing herself as a "friend, wife and helper of his great fellow countryman, the outstanding party activist Bolesław Bierut". She asked for Polish retirement pay for herself and her family and the Polish authorities granted her request.

b. In a sense, Bierut's patriotism was recognised by Primate Stefan Wyszyński: "People of Mr Bierut type honestly care for the future of Poland. At the present time, they see no other opportunity to serve Poland than through communizing of the country." In 1952 Polish legislative election, Wyszyński himself voted for Bierut.

Political offices
Preceded by Władysław Raczkiewicz (President of the Polish Republic in Exile)	Chairman of the State National Council; 31 December 1944 – 4 February 1947	Succeeded by Himself as President
Preceded by Ignacy Mościcki	President of Poland; 5 February 1947 – 21 November 1952	Succeeded by Aleksander Zawadzki (Chairman of the Council of State)
Preceded by Józef Cyrankiewicz	Prime Minister of Poland; 20 November 1952 – 18 March 1954	Succeeded by Józef Cyrankiewicz
Party political offices
Preceded by Władysław Gomułka (as general secretary of the Polish Workers' Party)	General Secretary of the Polish United Workers' Party; 22 December 1948 – 12 March 1956	Succeeded by Edward Ochab
