= Terezin Declaration =

2009 agreement on economically restituting Holocaust victims

The Terezin Declaration is a non-binding declaration issued by 47 countries (Note: 46 countries signed in 2009, and in addition Serbia attended the conference as an observer but later ratified the declaration) in June 2009, agreeing on measures to right economic wrongs that accompanied the Holocaust against the Jews and other victims of Nazi persecution in Europe. It is neither a treaty nor legally binding international agreement. The Holocaust Era Assets Conference took place in Terezín, Czech Republic, the site of the Theresienstadt Ghetto. A year later 43 of the signatories (excluding Belarus, Malta, Russia and Poland) endorsed a companion document, the 2010 Guidelines and Best Practices for the Restitution and Compensation of Immovable (Real) Property, which set best practices for immovable property. According to the guidelines restitution of the property itself (in rem) is preferred, however when that is not possible payment or substitute property that is "genuinely fair and adequate" is possible. The declaration has no legal power and does not define how countries involved should act to fulfill it.

During the Holocaust, plunder of Jewish property took place in an organized manner and on a comprehensive scale. Following the war, while some Jews received their property back, this tended to be the exception. People who held on to plundered property considered it their own and resented survivors who came back to claim their property. While many countries passed laws on restitution, in many case these were in effect in name only, and in Eastern Europe were often in effect only for a few years. The Terezin declaration was passed in 2009 as a result of what US ambassador Stuart E. Eizenstat termed "the unfinished business of World War II".

In addition to restitution to survivors and heirs, the Terezin Declaration states that in some states heirless property (which devolved to the state) could serve as a basis for addressing the material necessities of needy Holocaust (Shoah) survivors and to ensure ongoing education about the Holocaust, its causes and consequences.

The Justice for Uncompensated Survivors Today (JUST) Act of 2017 requires the United States Department of State to report to Congress on steps that the signatories of the Terezin Declaration have taken to compensate Holocaust survivors and their heirs for assets seized by Nazi Germany and post-war communist governments.
