= Justice for Uncompensated Survivors Today Act of 2017 =

US legislation

Justice for Uncompensated Survivors Today (JUST) Act of 2017
- Long title: An Act to require reporting on acts of certain foreign countries on Holocaust era assets and related issues.
- Enacted by: the 115th United States Congress
- Effective: 9 May 2018

Citations
- Public law: Pub. L. 115–171 (text) (PDF)

Legislative history
- Introduced in the Same day in House and Senate as H.R.1226 / S.447 by Joe Crowley (D–NY) and Tammy Baldwin (D–WI) on 27 February 2017; Committee consideration by House Committee on Foreign Affairs / United States Senate Committee on Foreign Relations; Passed the Senate on 12 December 2017 (Unanimous consent); Passed the House on 24 April 2018 (Voice vote); Signed into law by President Donald Trump on 9 May 2018

The Justice for Uncompensated Survivors Today (JUST) Act of 2017 (Pub. L. 115–171 (text) (PDF),S. 447 (and identical H.R. 1226)) is US legislation that requires the State Department to report to Congress on steps that 47 countries in Europe (the signatories of the 2009 non-binding Terezin Declaration) have taken to compensate Holocaust survivors and their heirs for assets seized by Nazi Germany and post-war communist governments.

The bill does not provide the US with any enforcement power, only requiring reporting to Congress.

== Background ==
The Terezin Declaration from 2009, to which 47 countries are signatories, states that protection of property rights is part of the rule of law and an essential feature of democratic societies. The declaration recognizes the importance of property restitution or compensation in regards to property confiscated during the Holocaust era between 1933 and 1945. According to Tammy Baldwin and Marco Rubio, the Senate sponsors of the bill, while several countries have endorsed the declaration they have not actually implemented the required restitution. In addition to restitution to survivors and heirs, the Terezin Declaration states that heirless property (which devolved to the state) should be used for the benefit of needy Holocaust survivors, commemoration, and Holocaust education.

== Provisions ==
The bill requires the State Department to report to congress on steps that 47 countries in Europe, signatories of the 2009 Terezin Declaration, have taken to compensate Holocaust survivors and their heirs for assets seized by Nazi Germany and post-war communist governments. Additional reporting requirements are specified on restitution to Holocaust survivors who are US citizens or their relatives.

=== Heirless property ===
In addition to the above, the bill contains provision calling for restitution of property even if the owners died without leaving any descendants - the so-called heirless property. It is an accepted customary international law that heirless property becomes property of the state.

The Terezin declaration states that "in some states heirless property could serve as a basis for addressing the material necessities of needy Holocaust (Shoah) survivors and to ensure ongoing education about the Holocaust (Shoah), its causes and consequences". The JUST act requires reporting on the adherence to Terezin, including so called heirless property.

== Responses to the law ==
While the bill does not single out any particular country, the Polish government sees itself as the target of the law. It particular, it is strongly opposed to compensation for heirless property, as this would imply, in their view, co-responsibility for the Holocaust.

Former Polish Prime Minister Leszek Miller stated in April 2018 that all property claims by individuals that are US citizens have been settled by the agreement signed between US and Poland on 16 July 1960.

Polish Foreign Minister Jacek Czaputowicz criticized basing restitution of property on ethnic criteria, which amounts to "[demanding] privileges for the Jews, for the Jewish community". Czaputowicz stated that Poles who had fought Nazi Germany and later emigrated, had their property seized by the Communist authorities, yet "nobody speaks on their behalf, only on the behalf of the Jews. That is not good because that divides our society." In reply, the World Jewish Restitution Organization stated that they did not find the act to be discriminatory, as it covers "both Holocaust victims and other victims of Nazi persecution." It further added that "[we have] long advocated for the passage of [Polish] legislation that would provide restitution to all property owners whose property was wrongfully taken—both Jewish and non-Jewish owners".

Diplomat Ryszard Schnepf categorically rejected the idea of paying any compensation for "heirless property" and different treatment of groups based on their ethnicity or religion. Adam Sandauer criticized the idea of claiming compensation from Poland and what he calls "selective treatment of claims based on ethnic criteria", wrote that a question arises if the claims should be paid for by German state who murdered original owners rather than Polish state who took over heirless property after the war if the owners perished, as per law. According to Sandauer a global solution based on compromise should be enacted that will treat all ethnic groups equally (Jews, Poles, Ukrainians, Armenians, or Serbs and Croats), not just one nation.

According to former Polish diplomat and publicist Witold Tomasz Jurasz, enacting the provision to restitute only former Jewish property (most likely to Jewish American organizations) while leaving non-Jewish property in hands of the state would in effect mean that Polish Jews would not be considered Poles, which could be considered antisemitic, and likewise giving preference to one ethnic group would be racially discriminating.
