= Reprivatization =

Process of restoring previously nationalized properties

Reprivatization refers to the process of restoring properties seized or otherwise nationalized from privately held owners by a government to privately held status. This may include returning seized property or compensating uncompensated former owners, or reprivatizing state held enterprises to new owners, especially banks, which were privately founded but came under state control due to economic crisis or other factors. The latter scenario is sometimes referred to as privatization, though scholars have specifically referred to the sale of nationalized Mexican and Korean banks to private shareholders as reprivatization. The terms reprivatization and privatization are sometimes used to describe similar processes. The term privatization is more often used to describe the transfer of property under long-term government control to private owners, while reprivatization implies the property being returned to privately held status came under government control on a circumstantial basis. Both terms have been used in connection with larger privatization schemes in the former Soviet Bloc, particularly the process of assigning new property rights.

Reprivatization to private owners has been sought by any number of parties whose property has been nationalized, including the traditional nobility in certain areas of Europe, Holocaust survivors, their descendants, and other survivors of persons who died in Nazi death camps and whose property was confiscated by the Nazis or by later Communist states and disposed of in various ways; and by corporations.

A significant barrier to reprivatization is created by larger political questions, which vary by country. In Eastern Europe, there is frequently a desire to avoid the inflammation of ethnic tensions and the ostensible reversal of Potsdam Conference policies; see Federation of Expellees.

Outstanding reprivatization issues can sometimes be a barrier to foreign investment, as investors are wary of investing in a property to which the title is disputed or faulty.

== Reasons for reprivatization ==
Reprivatization can be initiated due to a desire:

- to reduce the number of state property
- to increase the size of the private sector in the country's economy
- to strengthen competition in various industries
- to increase the efficiency of the use of property as a source of improving the well-being of individuals and as a consequence of the country as a whole
- to eliminate the state monopoly in certain areas

== Forms and types of reprivatization ==
There are two main forms of reprivatization:

- Restitution. In this case, the property is returned to the former private owner.
- Compensation. The value of the property is reimbursed through the provision of government securities or cash.

In their pure form, both these forms are rare. Most often they are used at the same time, compensating for part of the costs in the form of reimbursement of funds, the rest is provided in kind. In addition, reprivatization can also be accompanied by compensation for material damage (lost profits, downtime). Requirements for reimbursement can be put forward both by the former owner and by the state itself:

- The owner can claim compensation for the amount of income that he could receive if his property was not nationalized.
- The state can claim for reimbursement of expenses incurred, as a rule, it may be expenses for modernization, maintenance of the relevant condition,

== Reprivatization by country ==
=== Great Britain ===
Most often, when discussing reprivatization, it turns to the example of Margaret Thatcher. After becoming prime minister in 1979, she decided to handle the economic difficulties faced by the United Kingdom at the time by engaging in a campaign against the trade unions and changing the role of the state in the British economy. One of the ways to implement the plan was to choose reprivatization.

Large-scale reprivatization touched the oil, gas, electronic, aerospace and some other industries. Many enterprises that were in a difficult economic situation (including British Airways, British Petroleum), legally transferred to state ownership and received considerable financial support from it. And all this is only to be transferred to private hands through privatization ten years later.

=== Germany ===
The revival of entrepreneurship in the first period after World War II went on in the eastern lands in several forms. These were the creation of new firms, reprivatization, the organization of joint ventures with the participation of Western capital and former national enterprises. A kind of transitional measure is the decentralization of management within the former combines, as a result of which the former state enterprises begin to act as free producers in the market environment. Immediately after the unification of Germany, about 6,000 applications for the redemption of enterprises by their former owners were filed. With full redemption of the household enterprises had the opportunity to obtain a loan from the German Credit Bank under the collateral value of the land plot.

=== Spain ===
The history of privatization and nationalization in Spain is the story of the "nationalization of losses and the privatization of profits." In a crisis, the government bought up or otherwise nationalized loss-making enterprises, actually saving them from bankruptcy. Later, when for some reason they became profitable and successful companies, the government again sold them to private hands. At the same time, traditionally unprofitable industries, such as, for example, the coal industry, radio and television, railway and shipbuilding companies, remain in the hands of the state. Analysts state that the goals of privatization - to increase budget revenues as much as possible and to increase competition in different markets - are in general contradictory to each other, so it was possible to achieve either one or the other, but not both.

=== France ===
In France, as in many other European countries, a vast public sector of the economy was formed after World War II. However, subsequently, the country's leadership did not adhere to a unified policy regarding the management of state property and its fate as a whole. Here, in comparison with other developed countries, the most pronounced were the so-called waves of property transformation. The processes of nationalization and privatization consistently succeeded each other, depending on who was in power. The last large-scale nationalization took place in the early 80's. Large commercial banks and many industrial enterprises were nationalized. However, during the reign of President François Mitterrand, the French economy was already experiencing difficulties due to high state participation and a large number of state companies. In connection with this, in the presidency of Jacques Chirac in the late 1990s. processes of privatization of the state enterprises have begun.

=== Poland ===
Unlike the industrial sector, Poland's agricultural sector remained largely in private hands during the decades of communist rule. Most of the former state farms are now leased to farmer tenants. Lack of credit is hampering efforts to sell former state farmland. Currently, Poland's 2 million private farms occupy 90% of all farmland and account for roughly the same percentage of total agricultural production. These farms are small—8 hectares (20 acres) on average—and often fragmented. Farms with an area exceeding 15 hectares (37 acres) accounted for only 9% of the total number of farms but cover 45% of the total agricultural area. Over half of all farming households in Poland produce only for their own needs with little, if any, commercial sales.

=== Ukraine ===
Reforms in the more politically sensitive areas of structural reform and land privatisation are still lagging. The parliament has approved a foreign investment law allowing Westerners to purchase businesses and property, to repatriate revenue and profits, and to receive compensation in the event that property is nationalized by a future government. Outside institutions—particularly the IMF—have encouraged Ukraine to quicken the pace and scope of reforms and have threatened to withdraw financial support.

Reprivatization in both political and economic terms is noted by the authors of the monograph "Privatization and Reprivatization in Ukraine after the Orange Revolution" - proved to be an ineffective way of reviewing the results of privatization in Ukraine. Reprivatization, which was carried out through the courts, proved to be a long and exhausting process. "The process of reprivatization as a way to review the results of privatization was formed under the influence of the general revolutionary moods of the population and the character of the first government team led by Yulia Tymoshenko, accustomed to an irreconcilable opposition struggle".

Kryvorizhstal is Ukraine's largest integrated steel company. In 2004, the enterprise became an open joint-stock company "Kryvorozhskiy Mining and Metallurgical Combine". In the same year, the government of Ukraine allowed a consortium created by the structures of politicians and businessmen Rinat Akhmetov and Victor Pinchuk (son-in-law of President Leonid Kuchma) to privatize the largest steel plant for $803 million.

After the Tymoshenko government came to power in February 2005, the procedure of judicial return of the plant to state property was launched. On April 22, 2005, the Kyiv Economic Court declared illegal the sale of a 93.02% stake in Kryvorizhstal and decided to return them to the state.

On October 24, 2005, Kryvorizhstal was reprivatized. The world's largest metallurgical company Mittal Steel won the contest. It laid out a 93.02% stake in Kryvorozhstal OJSC 24.2 billion UAH ($4.8 billion).

=== Hungary ===
During the period immediately following the decline of communism in Eastern Europe, including Hungary, previously state-owned enterprises began the process of reprivatization of sectors that were nationalized during the communist era. The changes in ownership and property rights during this era have been referred to both as privatization and reprivatization, though in the Hungarian context former pre-communist property owners were given capital vouchers of little actual value as compensation. This meant that property may have been considered “reprivatized,” though the former owners incurred little actual benefit. The new democratic government set a public spending goal of 30% of GDP, and began to encourage the development of a domestic capital market to stimulate this change.

Early on, the government focused on the reprivatization of the food industry, which was an early success in the new government's effort. Foreign investors were encouraged to participate in creating new ownership for these firms. By 1993, 47% of Hungarian private-sector earnings were in the food industry. Certain sectors of the food industry, such as those which previously produced mainly for export to other former Soviet satellites, including the meat and dairy industries, had less liquidity and were slower to privatize. The impacts on Hungarians were mixed, with many Hungarians who worked for unprofitable state-owned enterprises becoming unemployed as a result of new private management. However, sectors that were able to successfully convert to profitable private enterprises saw more limited losses.

=== South Korea ===
After the 1997 Asian financial crisis, the recently elected South Korean opposition government of President Kim Dae-jung nationalized many financially defunct banks. While the previous government was entrenched in the chaebol patronage system between the state and large corporations, the new government owed its election to political and civil society organizations. This fact meant that decision making for the recently nationalized banks would be driven more by political concerns rather than purely economic factors.

The reprivatization of banks in South Korea has proceeded slowly, and as of 2010 the state had still not relinquished all of its shareholdings. In the South Korean context, literature has specifically referred to the privatization of circumstantially nationalized banks as reprivatization, though the previous chaebol owners were in fact prohibited from having the bulk of their ownership returned. The Korean Banking Act prevented chaebol-affiliated corporations outside of the finance sector from owning more than 4% of voting shares in commercial banks. However, this reform slowed reprivatization as there were no domestic Korean buyers outside of the chaebol that could afford to purchase shares in the banks.

=== Mexico ===
Beginning in 1983, the Mexican state began a process of reprivatizing previously state-held companies, with the largest target being state-held banks, which were nationalized the previous year in response to an extremely high default debt faced by the state. In the 1990s President Carlos Salinas began to accelerate this process as part of a larger privatization campaign to fund social programs. Both the privatization of state owned enterprises and the reprivatization of recently privatized banks were extremely lucrative to the state, though the latter carried political and economic consequences. In the case of Mexico, banks were reprivatized to the same wealthy banking class, and though there was no formal compensation of the previous owners, the new owners were largely the same members of the financial elite. The lack of banking regulations imposed during the reprivitization campaign in order to secure Salinas’ support among the banking elite eventually lead to the collapse of the State Bank Saving Protection Fund (Foboproa) later on in the decade.

== See also ==
- Land reform
- Nationalisation
- Restitution
- Property restitution in Latvia
