= Zagórze =

Zagórze may refer to the following places in Poland:

In Lesser Poland Voivodeship (south Poland):

- Zagórze, Chrzanów County
- Zagórze, Gorlice County
- Zagórze, Wadowice County
- Zagórze, Wieliczka County
- Zagórze, Limanowa County

In Łódź Voivodeship (central Poland):

- Zagórze, Gmina Gidle
- Zagórze, Gmina Wielgomłyny
- Zagórze, Rawa County
- Zagórze, Skierniewice County
- Zagórze, Wieruszów County

In Lublin Voivodeship (east Poland):

- Zagórze, Łęczna County
- Zagórze, Lublin County

In Lubusz Voivodeship (west Poland):

- Zagórze, Strzelce-Drezdenko County
- Zagórze, Świebodzin County
- Zagórze, Zielona Góra County

In Masovian Voivodeship (east-central Poland):

- Zagórze, Mińsk County
- Zagórze, Otwock County
- Zagórze, Przysucha County

In Pomeranian Voivodeship (north Poland):

- Zagórze (Rumia)

In Silesian Voivodeship (south Poland):

- Zagórze, Sosnowiec
- Zagórze, Częstochowa County
- Zagórze, Myszków County

In Subcarpathian Voivodeship (south-east Poland):

- Zagórze, Dębica County
- Zagórze, Przeworsk County

In Świętokrzyskie Voivodeship (south-central Poland):

- Zagórze, Gmina Bliżyn
- Zagórze, Gmina Łączna
- Zagórze, Jędrzejów County
- Zagórze, Pińczów County

In West Pomeranian Voivodeship (north-west Poland):

- Zagórze, Białogard County
- Zagórze, Kamień County

Also:

- Zagórze, Podlaskie Voivodeship (north-east Poland)
- Zagórze, a neighbourhood on Ostrów Tumski, Poznań

== See also ==
- Zagórz, a town in Sanok County, Subcarpathian Voivodeship
- Zagórz, West Pomeranian Voivodeship, a village
- Zagórze Śląskie, a village in the administrative district of Gmina Walim, within Wałbrzych County, Lower Silesian Voivodeship
