= Jamnik =

Jamnik or Jamník may refer to the following villages:

Poland

- Jamnik, Lesser Poland Voivodeship, southern Poland

Slovakia

- Jamník, Liptovský Mikuláš
- Jamník, Spišská Nová Ves

Slovenia

- Jamnik, Kranj, a settlement in the City Municipality of Kranj, northwestern Slovenia
- Jamnik, Vrhnika, a settlement in the Municipality of Vrhnika, west-central Slovenia
