= Hadle Szklarskie =

- Village
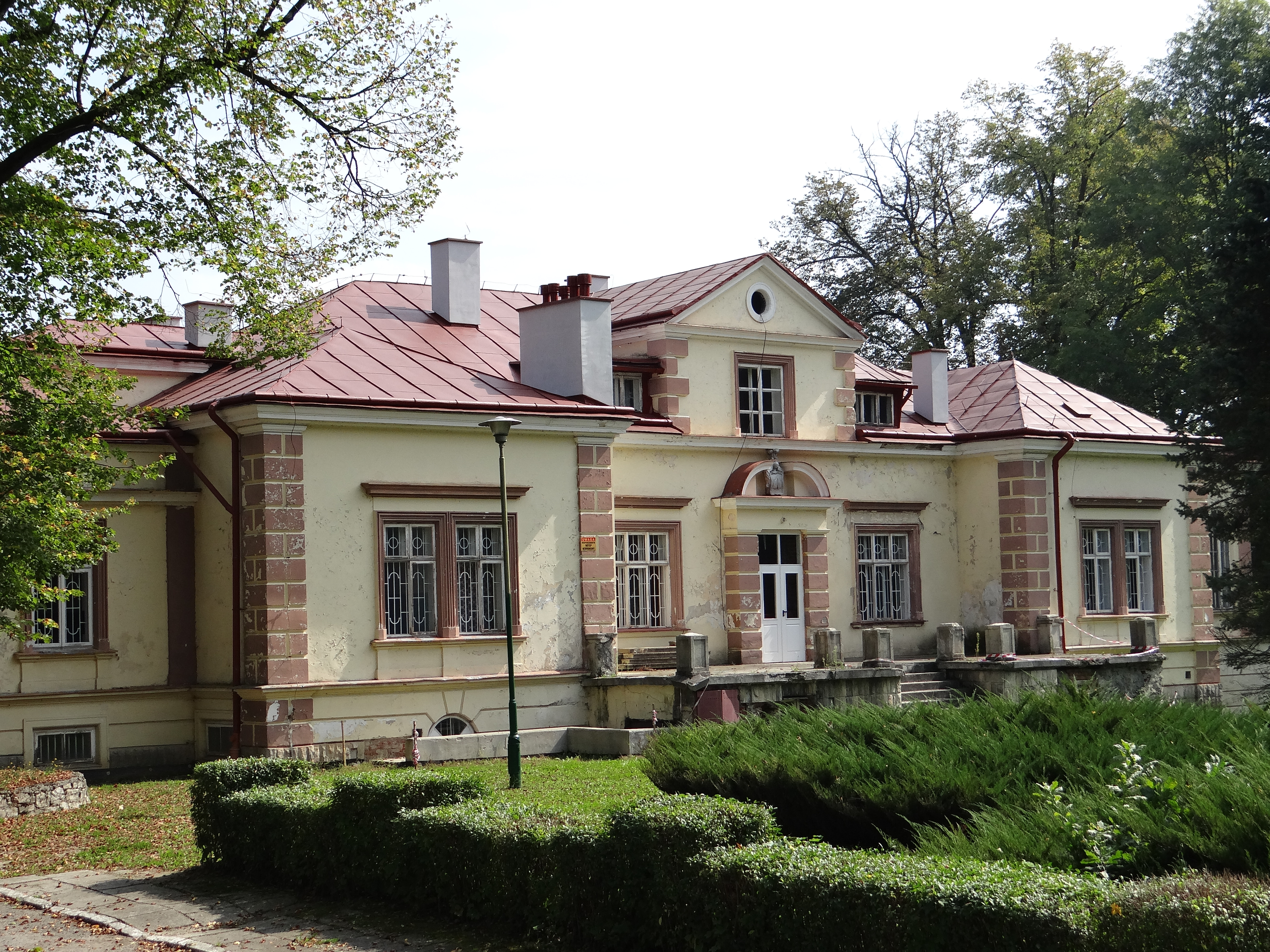
- Łastowiecki Palace in Hadle Szklarskie

- Location within Poland
- Coordinates: 49°55′N 22°18′E
- Country: Poland
- Voivodeship: Subcarpathian
- County: Przeworsk
- Gmina: Jawornik Polski
- Time zone: UTC+1 (CET)
  - Summer (DST): UTC+2 (CEST)
- Vehicle registration: RPZ

Hadle Szklarskie [ˈxadlɛ ˈʂklarskʲɛ] is a village in the administrative district of Gmina Jawornik Polski, within Przeworsk County, Subcarpathian Voivodeship, in south-eastern Poland.

The most notable sight of the village is the palace and park complex, founded by the Polish noble Łastowiecki family of Larysza coat of arms.

== History ==
Hadle Szklarskie was founded in 1377, as Poland's first village to be established in accordance to the Wallachian law. It was part of the Kingdom of Poland until the First Partition of Poland (1772), when it was annexed by Austria, and in 1918 it was restored to Poland, when the country regained independence.

During the German occupation of Poland and the Holocaust (World War II), several Poles helped Jews, who were hiding from the Germans in the nearby forest, by providing them food. In December 1942, the Germans murdered three Poles, the Dec brothers, in Hadle Szklarskie, for helping Jews. They were denounced by 18-year-old Jewish woman Małka Schönfeld whom they helped, after the Germans promised to spare her life in exchange for information about Poles who aided Jews. In 2010, President of Poland Lech Kaczyński, posthumously awarded the Dec brothers with the Commander's Cross of the Order of Polonia Restituta, one of Poland's highest state decorations.

== Gallery ==
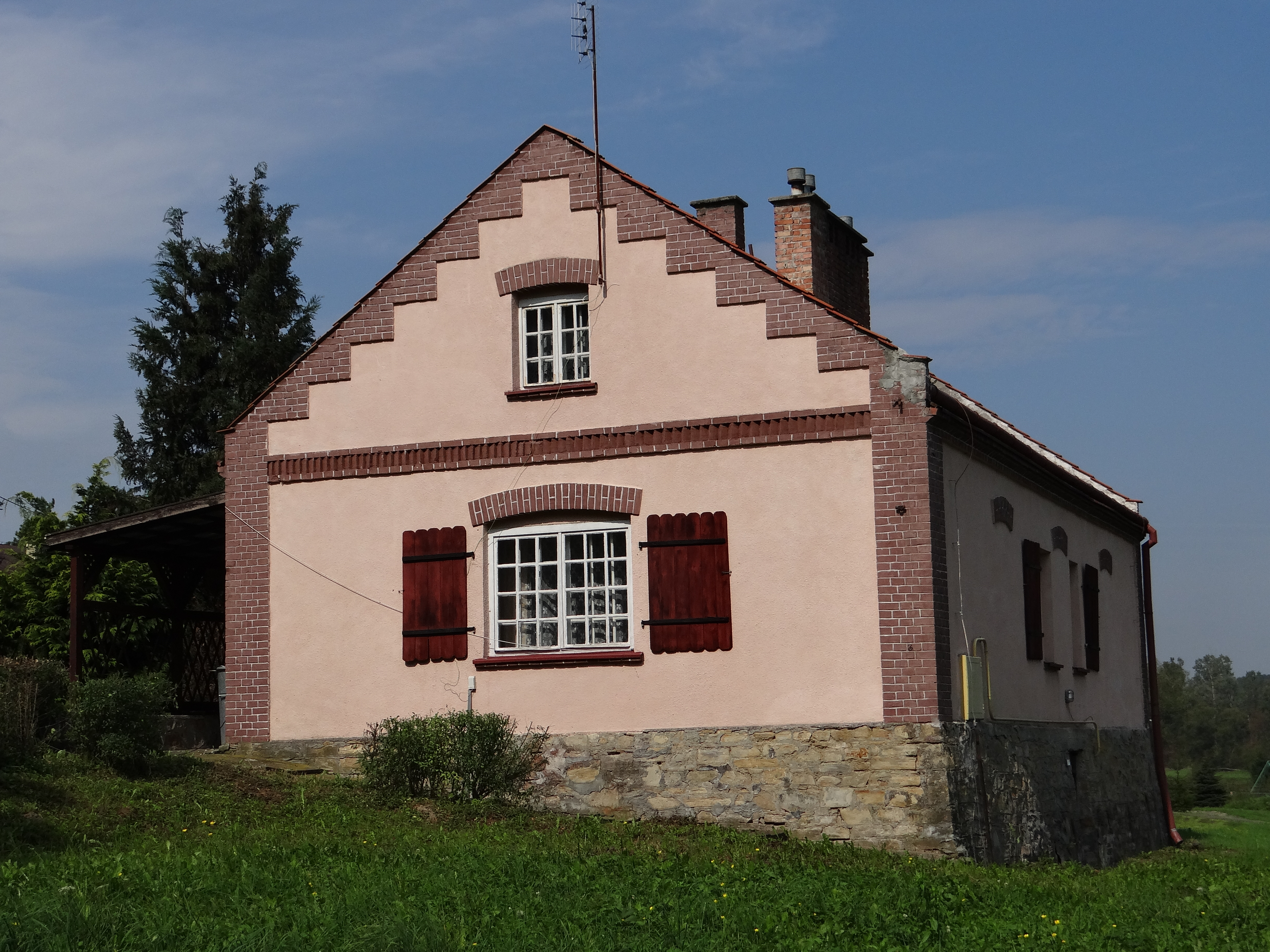
Old forge

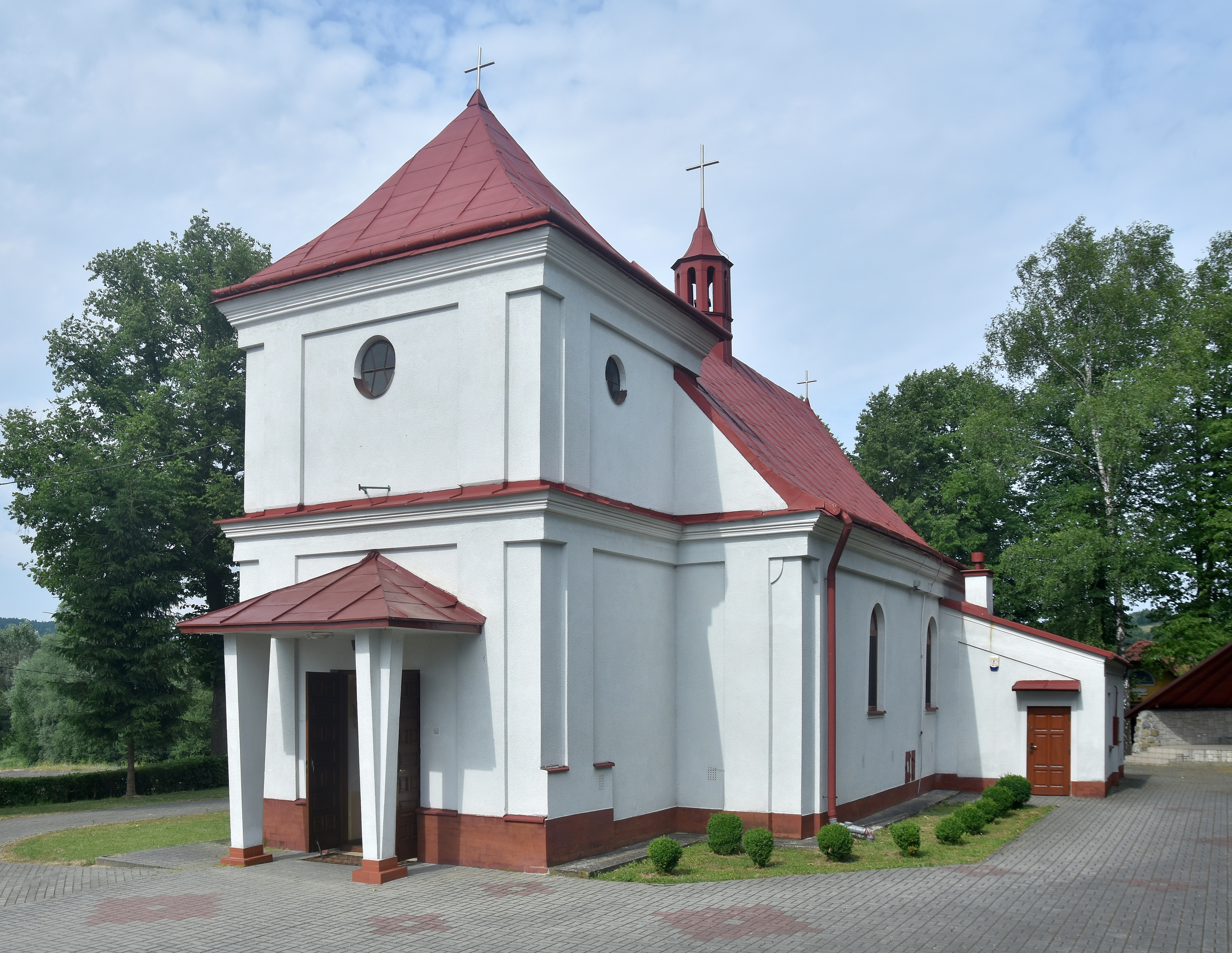
Church of the Immaculate Heart of Mary

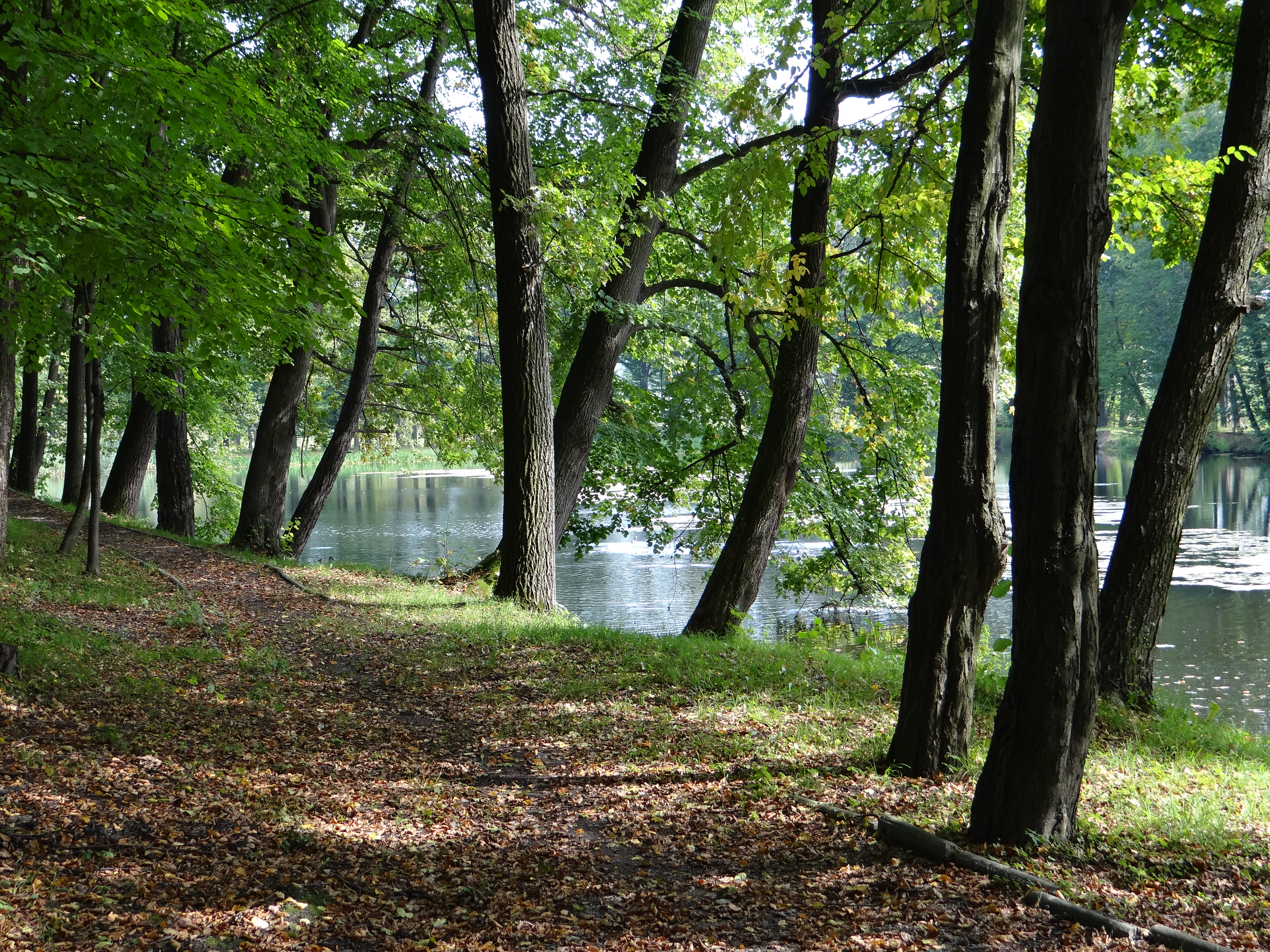
Łastowiecki Park

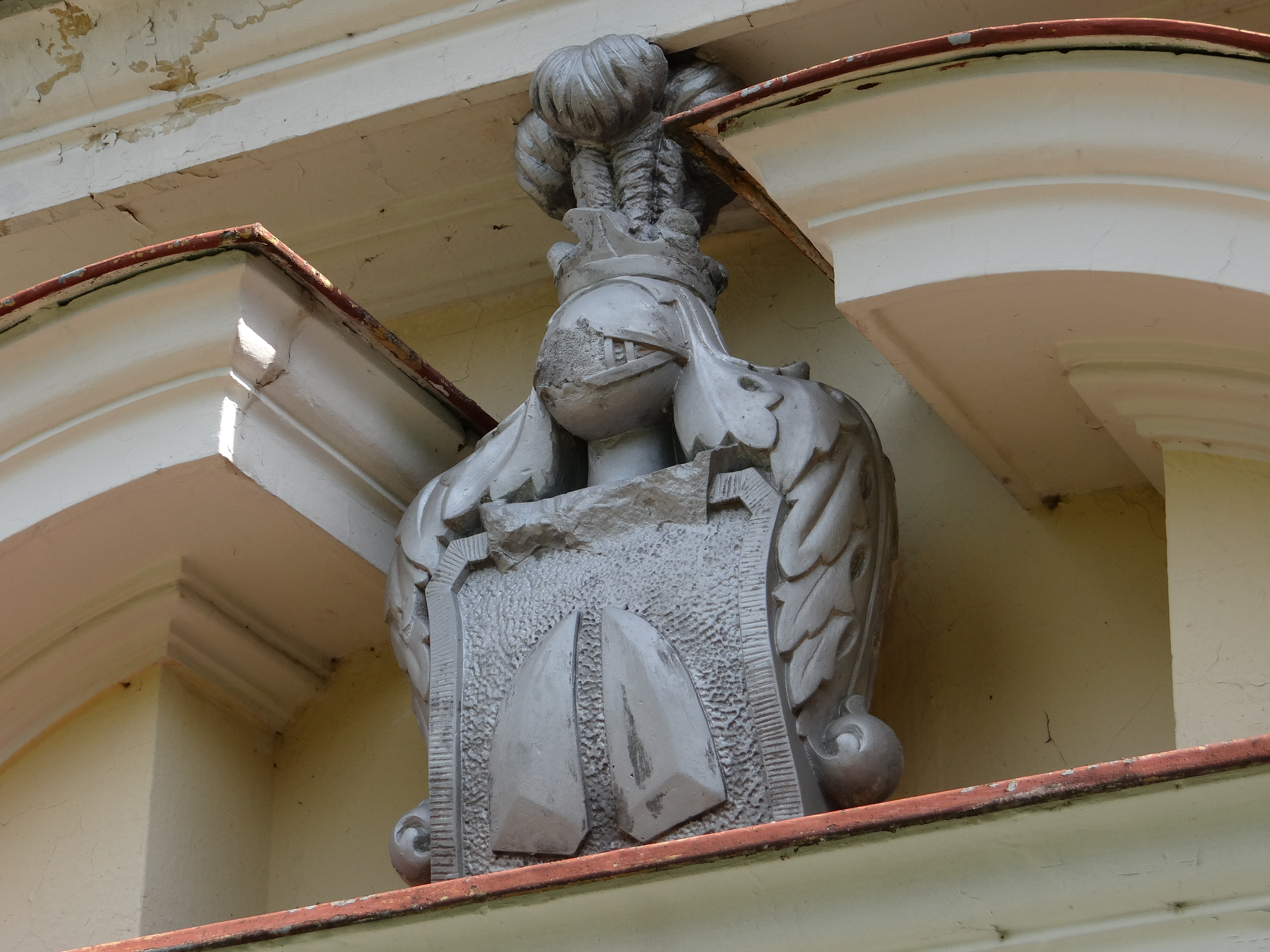
Larysza coat of arms on the facade of the Łastowiecki manor
