= Koziniec =

Koziniec may refer to the following places in Poland:

- Koziniec, Lower Silesian Voivodeship (south-west Poland)
- Koziniec, Podlaskie Voivodeship (north-east Poland)
- Koziniec, Lesser Poland Voivodeship (south Poland)
