= Slovak Armed Forces =

Combined military forces of the Slovak Republic

Armed Forces of the Slovak Republic
- Ozbrojené sily Slovenskej Republiky
- The official emblem of the Armed Forces of the Slovak Republic
- Motto: "Česť a sláva" (Honor and Glory)
- Founded: 1 January 1993
- Service branches: Slovak Ground Forces; Slovak Air Force; Slovak Special Operations Forces
- Headquarters: Ministry of defense, Bratislava, Slovakia
- Website: Official website

Leadership
- Commander-in-chief: Peter Pellegrini
- Minister of defense: Robert Kaliňák
- Chief of the General Staff: General Miroslav Lorinc

Personnel
- Military age: 18
- Conscription: Abolished in 2006
- Active personnel: 20,982
- Reserve personnel: ~ 3,000
- Deployed personnel: Bosnia and Herzegovina; Cyprus; Kosovo; Latvia

Expenditure
- Budget: €2,63 billion ($2.83 billion) (2024)
- Percent of GDP: 2.0% (2024)

Industry
- Domestic suppliers: Konštrukta – Defence; Tatra Defense Slovakia; ZTZ Špeciál; ZVS Holding; Grand Power; LOTN; Tanax trucks
- Foreign suppliers: United States; Czech Republic; Bulgaria; France; Germany; Poland; Israel; Finland; Sweden; Austria

Related articles
- History: Military history of Slovakia List of engagements: World War I (1917–1918); Western Front (1917–1918); Eastern front of World War I (1914-1917); Russian Civil War (1917-1921); Czechoslovak military history; Hungarian–Czechoslovak War (1918-1919); World War II (1940–1945); Western Front of World War II 1939-1945); Eastern Front of World War II 1939-1945); Cold War; Korean War (1950–1953); Air battle over Merklín (1953); Warsaw Pact invasion of Czechoslovakia (1968); Persian Gulf War (1990–1991); Global War on Terrorism (2001–present); Iraq War (2003–2010); War in Afghanistan (2001–2021) (2001-2021)
- Ranks: Military ranks of Slovakia

The Armed Forces of the Slovak Republic were divided from the Czechoslovak Army after dissolution of Czechoslovakia on 1 January 1993. Slovakia joined NATO on 29 March 2004. From 2006 the army transformed into a fully professional organization and compulsory military service was abolished. Slovak armed forces numbered 20,982 uniformed personnel and 4,500 civilians in 2025.

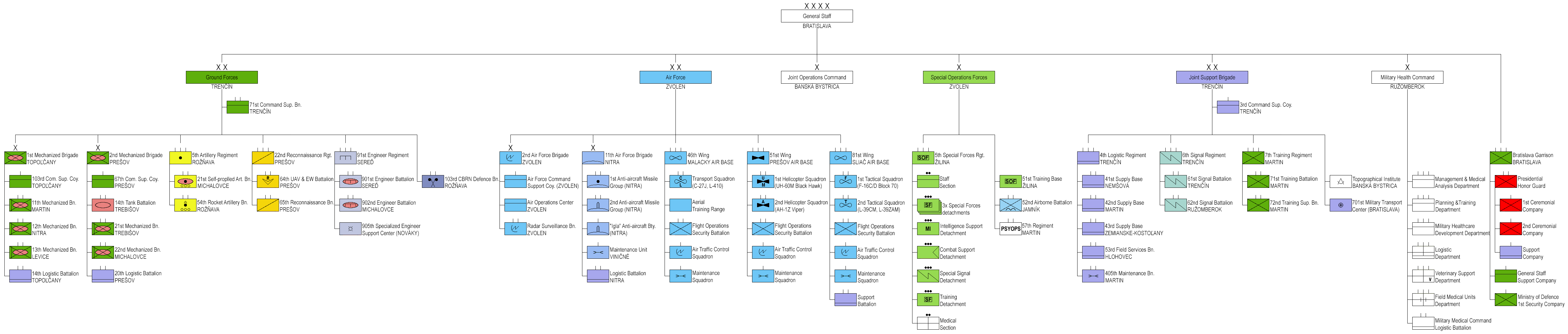
Slovak Armed Forces organization as of April 2026 (click to enlarge)

== Organization ==
Slovak Ground Forces locations 2018:
Brigade HQs Armored units Mechanized units Motorized units Artillery ISTAR
Engineer unit NBC-Defense Combat Service Support Brigade units Air bases

The Armed Forces consist of:

- General Staff
  - Military Intelligence
- Ground Forces
- Slovak Air Force
- Military police
- Special Operations Forces
- National Defense Force

=== Joint Operational Command ===
Joint Operational Command in Banská Bystrica (Commander: 2 Star General)

=== Ground Forces ===
- 1st Mechanized Brigade
- 2nd Mechanized Brigade
- 5th Artillery Regiment
- 91st Engineer Regiment
- 22nd Reconnaissance Regiment
- 71st Command Support Battalion
- 103rd Nuclear, Biological and Chemical Defence Battalion

=== Air Force ===
The Slovak Air Force, officially the Air Force of the Armed Forces of the Slovak Republic, has been defending Slovak airspace since independence in 1993. The Slovak Air Force currently comprises one wing of fighters, one wing of utility helicopters, one wing of transport aircraft, and one SAM brigade. It operates around 20 combat aircraft, as well as 10 helicopters from 3 air bases: Malacky Air Base, Sliač Air Base, Prešov Air Base. The Air Force is currently part of the NATO Integrated Air and Missiles Defense System – NATINADS.

=== Special Operations Forces ===
- 5th Special Forces Regiment
- 51st Training Base in Žilina
- 52nd Airborne Battalion in Jamník
- 57th Regiment in Martin (Psychological Operations and Civil–military co-operation)

=== 82nd Joint Support Brigade ===
- 3rd Command Support Company, in Trenčín
- 4th Logistic Regiment, in Trenčín
  - 41st Supply Base, in Nemšová
  - 42nd Supply Base, in Martin, Slovakia
  - 43rd Supply Base, in Zemianske Kostoľany
  - 53rd Field Services Battalion, in Hlohovec
  - 405th Maintenance Battalion, in Martin
- 6th Signal Regiment, in Trenčín
  - 61st Signal Battalion, in Trenčín
  - 62nd Signal Battalion, in Ružomberok
- 7th Training Regiment, in Martin
  - 71st Training Battalion
  - 72nd Training Support Battalion
- Topographic Institute, in Banská Bystrica
- 701st Military Transport Center, in Bratislava
- Training and Mobilization Replenishment Base, in Martin

=== Military Medical Command ===
Military Medical Command in Ružomberok

- HQ
- Department of Management and Medical Analysis
- Department of Planning and Training
- Department of Logistic
- Department of Military Healthcare Development
- Department of Veterinary Support
- Department of Field Medical Units
  - Field Mobil Medical Unit ROLE 2E
  - Field Mobil Medical Unit ROLE 2B
- Logistic Battalion of Military Medical Command
  - HQ
  - Material Support Company
  - Technical Support Company

== Personnel ==
Fundamental changes in the development of the armed forces occurred on 1 January 1998, when Act No. 370/1997 Coll. on Military Service abolished the term professional soldier, replacing it with the new term professional soldier. While this Act was in force, the Slovak Republic joined the NATO military alliance on 29 March 2004. A historically unique phenomenon occurred on 1 January 2006, when basic military service was abolished. On this day, the Armed Forces of the Slovak Republic became fully professionalized and began a new stage in their existence. Every soldier is obliged to take the Military Oath.

=== Education ===
Military education in Slovakia is centered around the Armed Forces Academy of General Milan Rastislav Štefánik (AOS) in Liptovský Mikuláš. It is the country's main institution for training future professional officers of the Slovak Armed Forces.

The academy offers bachelor's and master's degree programs in military and technical fields, focusing on leadership, defense strategy, engineering, and cybersecurity. It also provides specialized training for active-duty personnel and supports NATO-aligned education standards.

=== National Defense Force ===
The National Defense Force Slovak: Národné Obranné Sily in short NOS. They function de facto as a reserve force. NOS membership is open to Slovak citizens aged 18 to 65, including both men and women. Prospective members must be physically and mentally fit, law‑abiding, reliable, and permanent residents of Slovakia with citizenship. NOS organizes three categories of voluntary reserves:

1. Operational Reserves (Operačné zálohy) Serve both military defense and crisis management roles.
2. Readiness Reserves (Pohotovostné zálohy) Primarily focused on rapid crisis and emergency response.
3. Defense (Training) Reserves (Branné zálohy) For civilians without prior military experience—entails a one-time basic training

== Uniforms ==
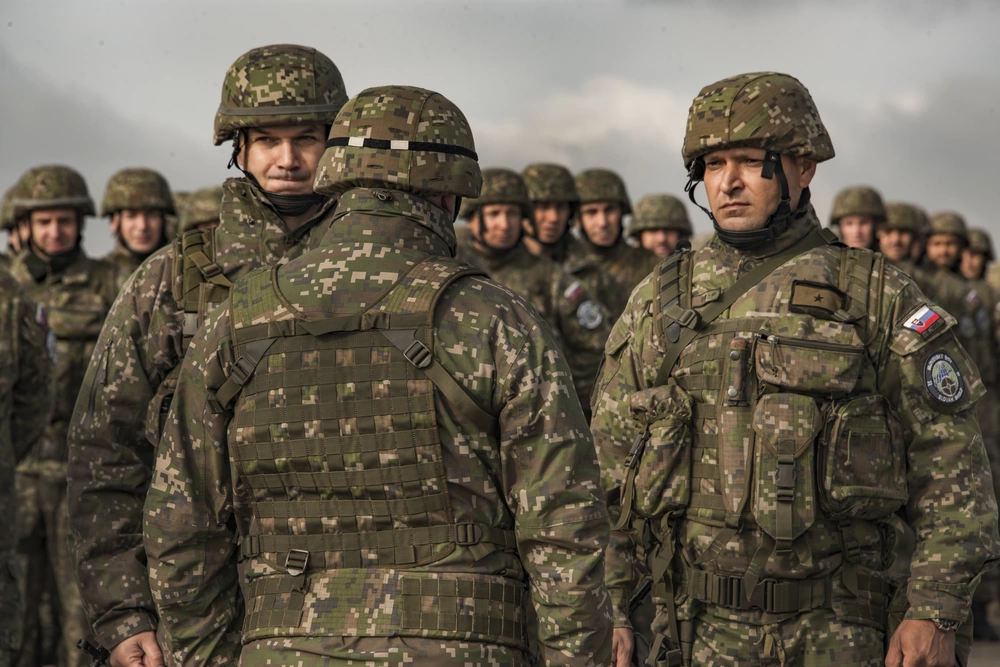
Soldiers in standard combat uniform vz.2007

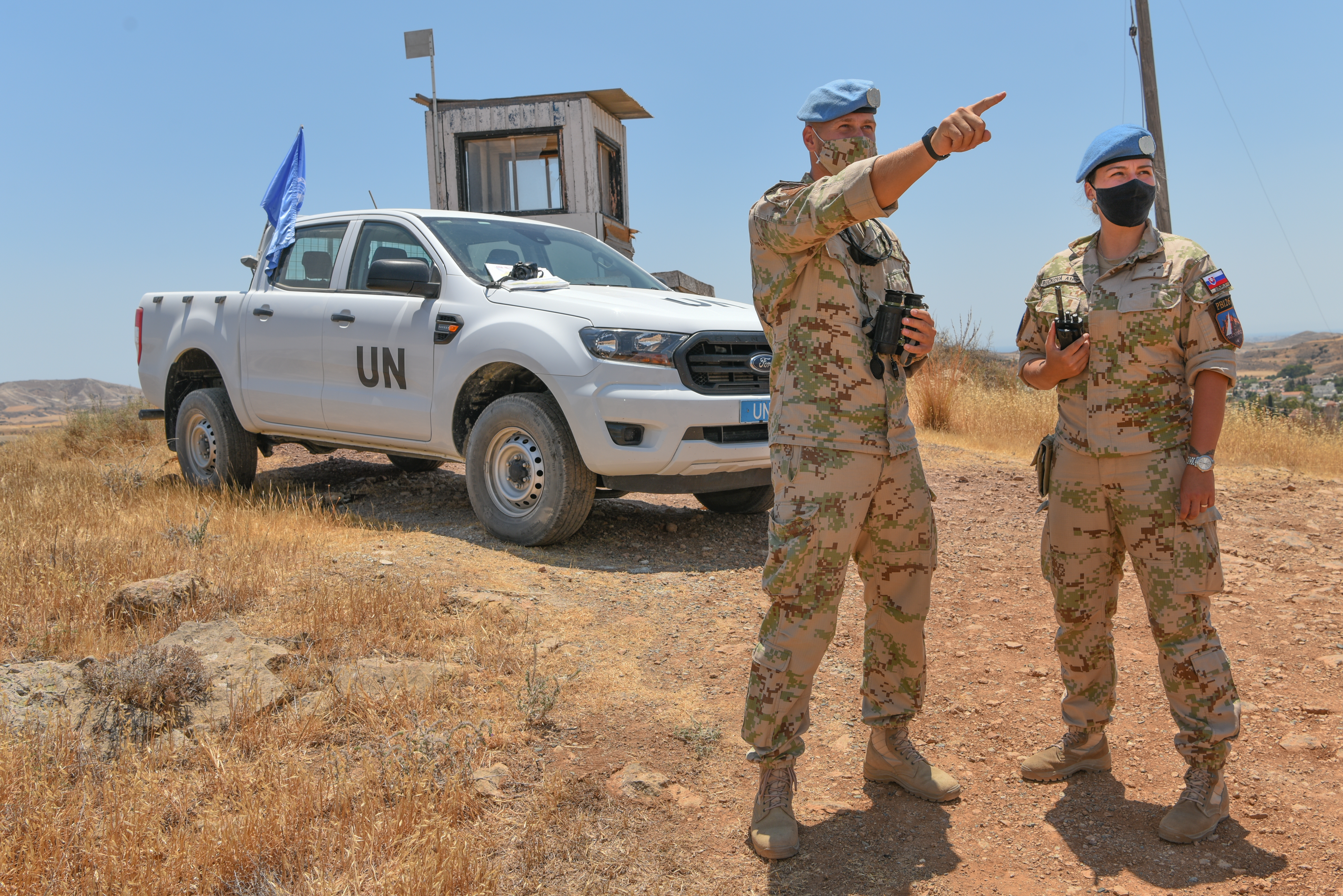
Soldiers in standard combat uniform
(desert variant)

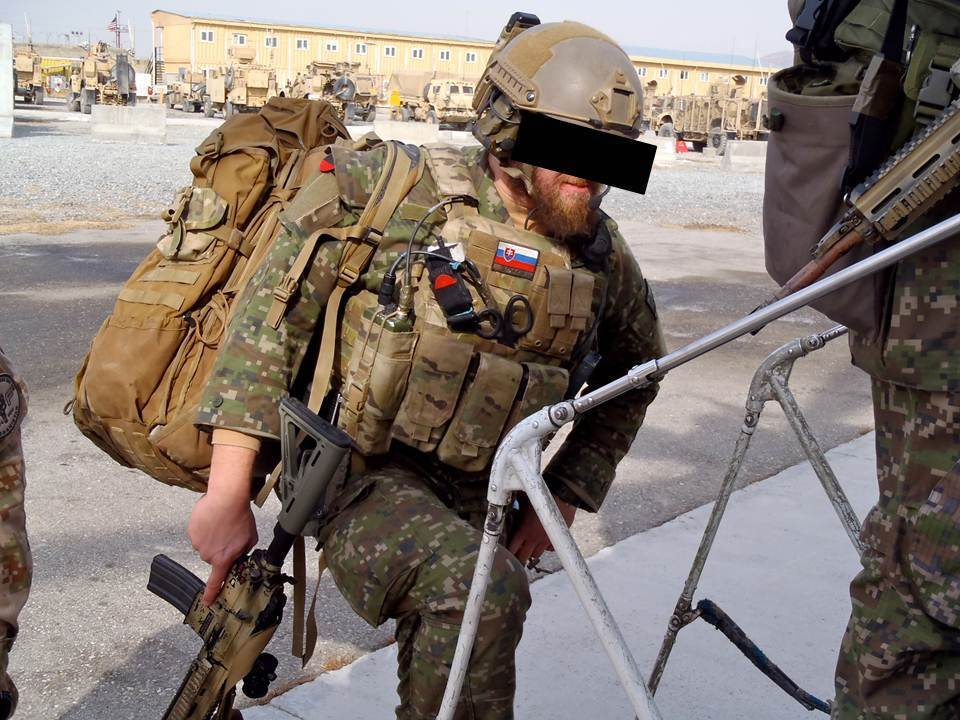
Uniform of Slovak special force regiment
(5th Special Operations Regiment)

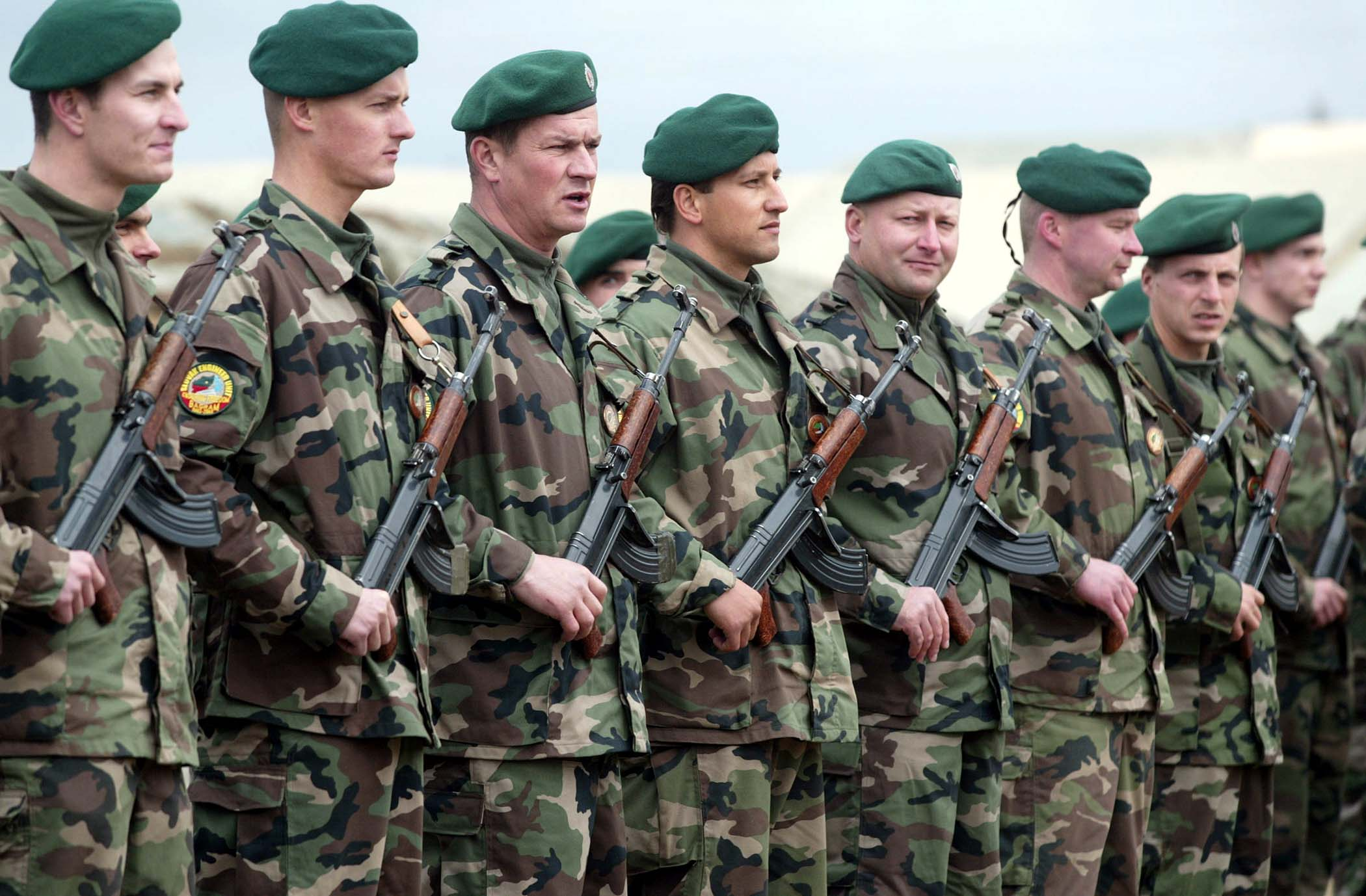
Used by soldiers in reserve, originally it was standard uniform of slovak soldiers from 1995 to 2007

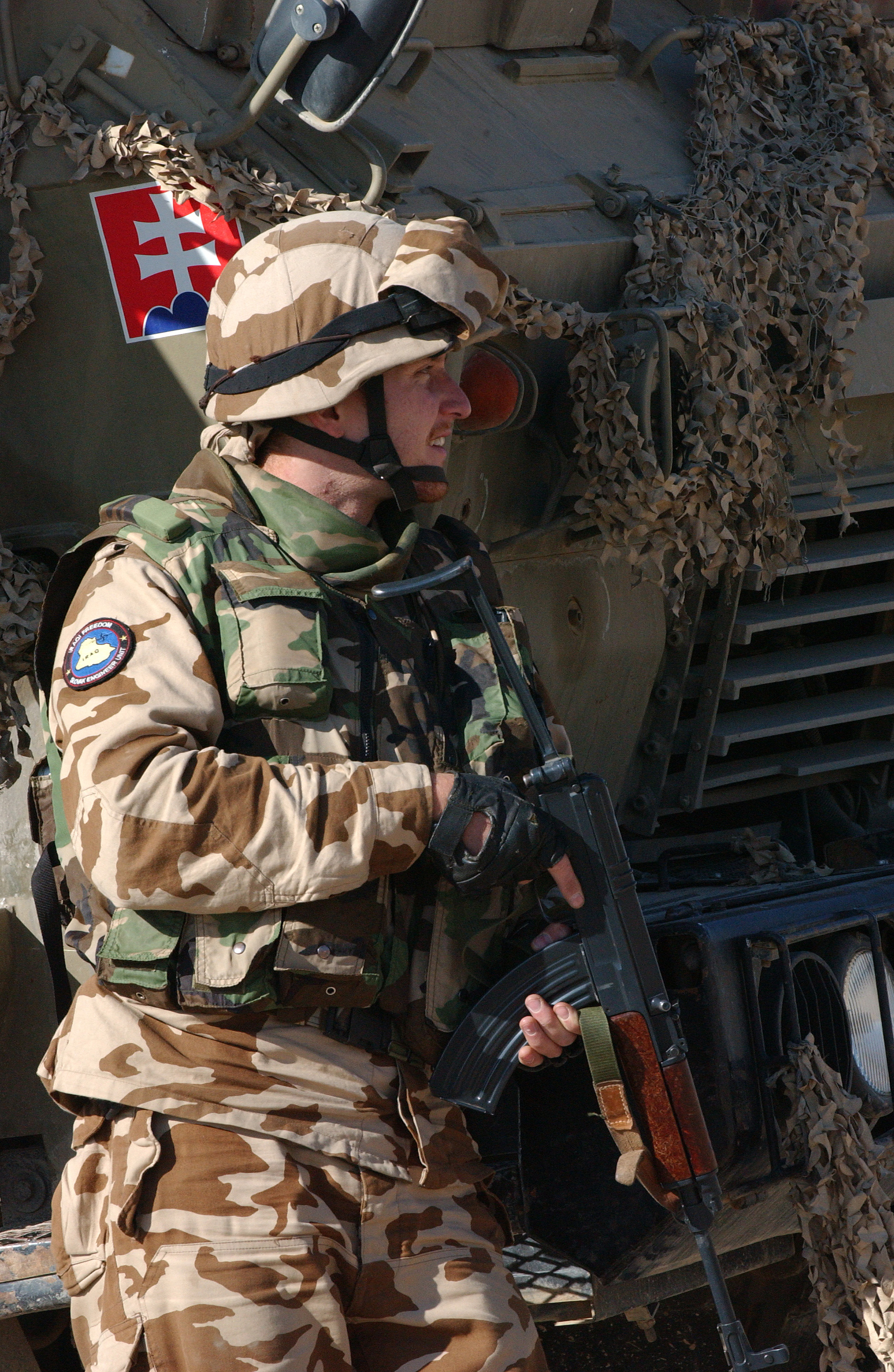
Used by soldiers in reserve, originally it was standard uniform of slovak soldiers from 1995 to 2007
(desert variant)

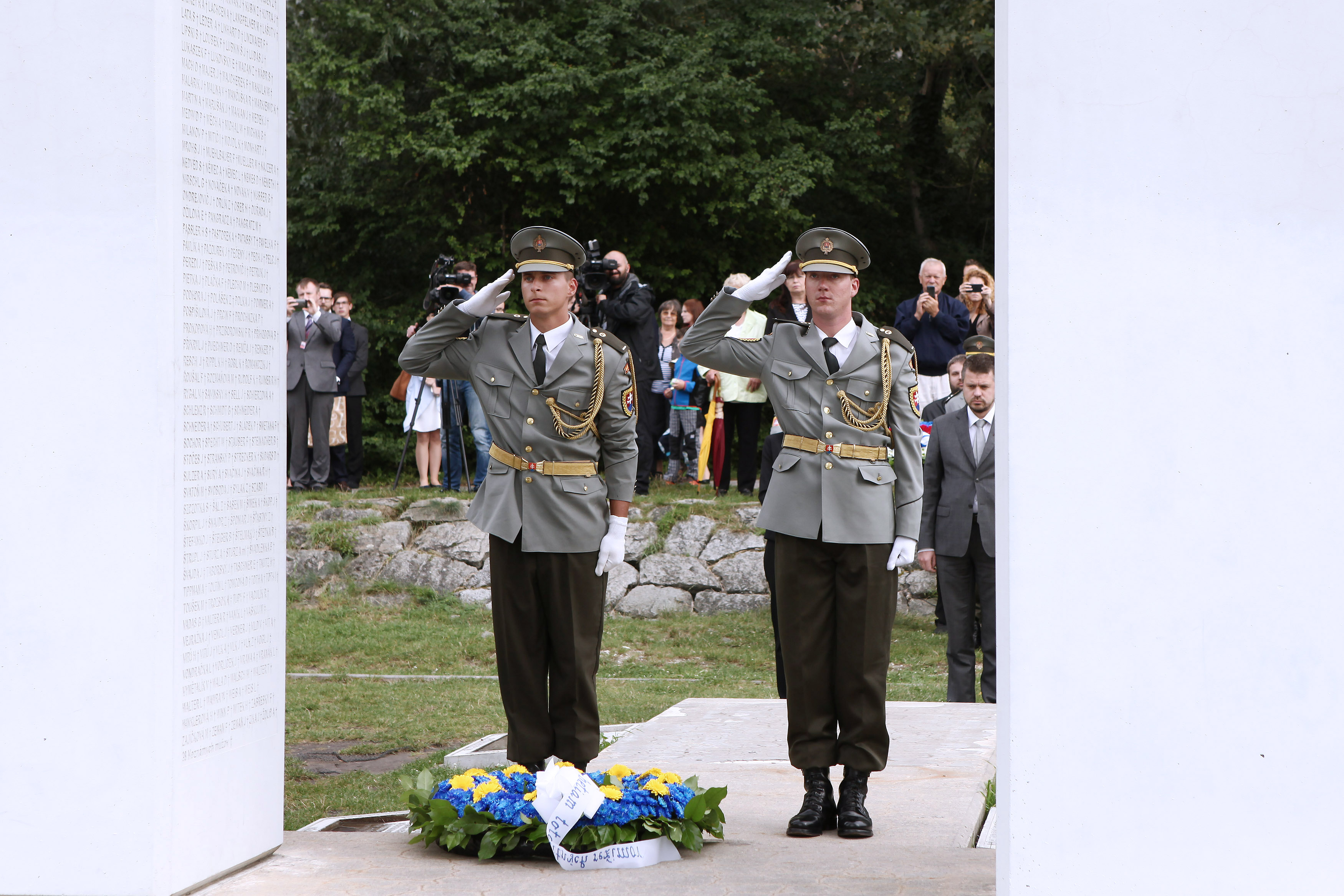
Uniform of the Honor Guard of the Slovak Armed Forces

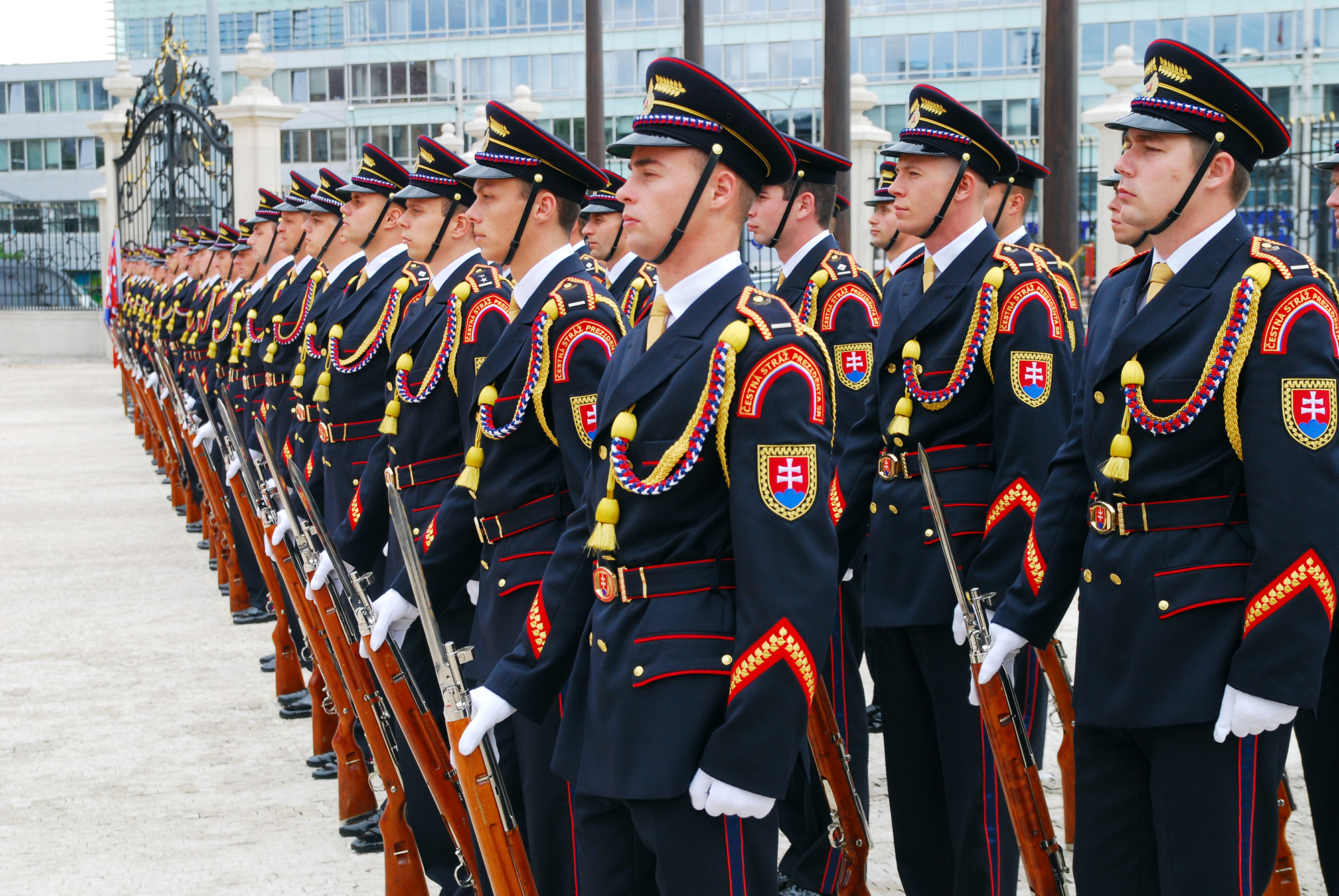
Uniform of the Honor Guard of the President of the Slovak Republic

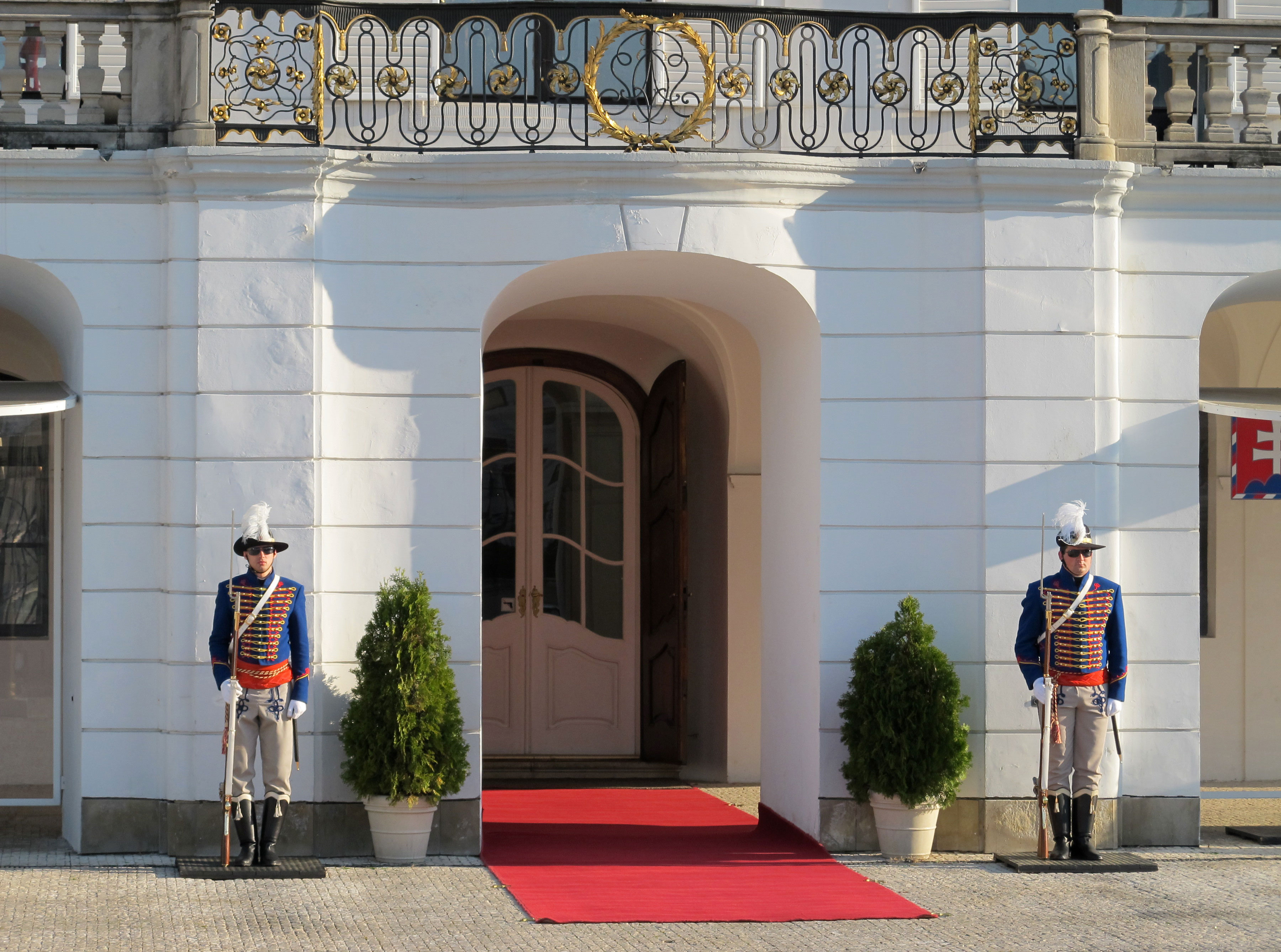
Honor Guard of the President of the Slovak Republic in the battalion's ceremonial uniform

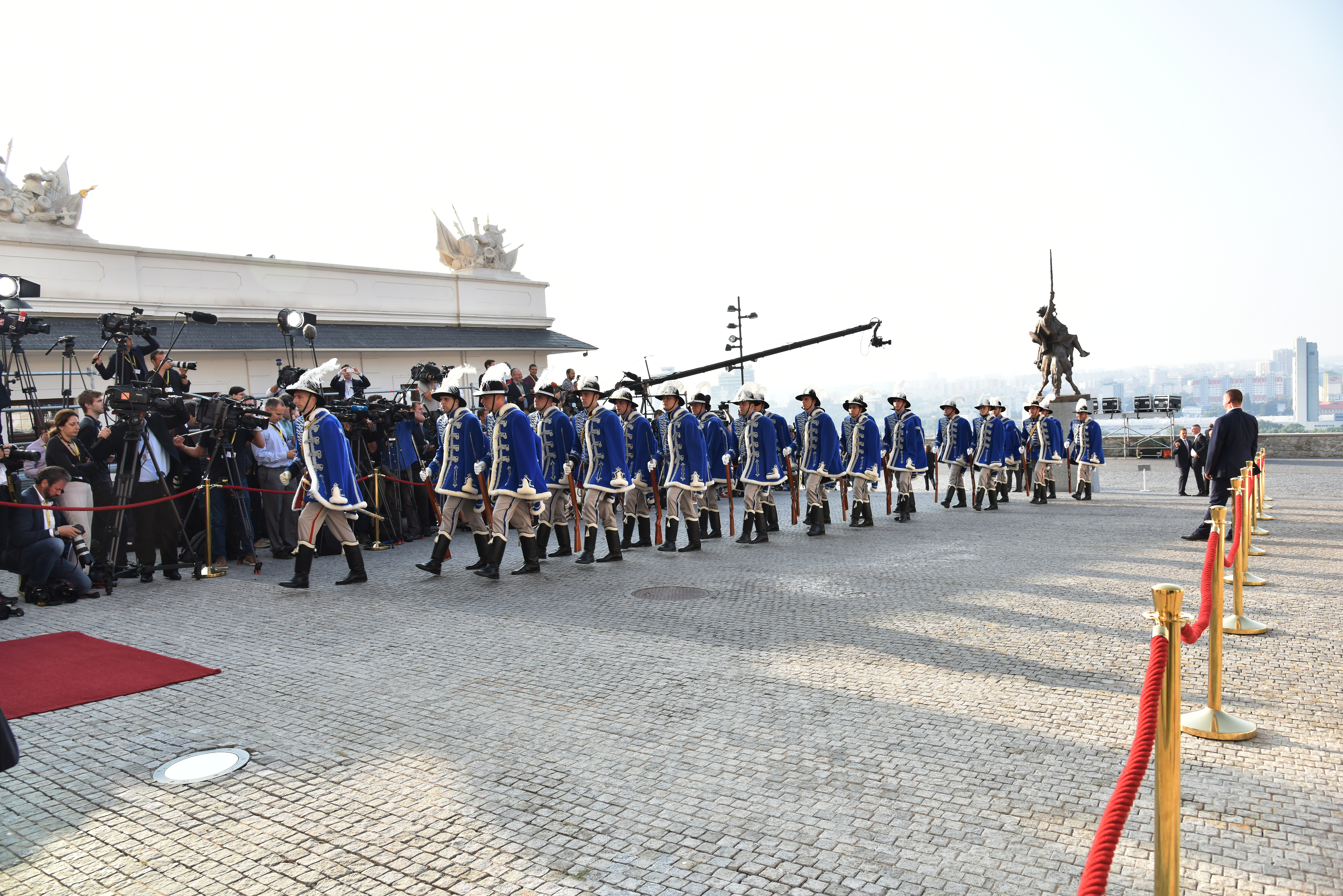
Honor Guard of the President of the Slovak Republic in the battalion's ceremonial uniform (based on Slovak Uprising uniforms)

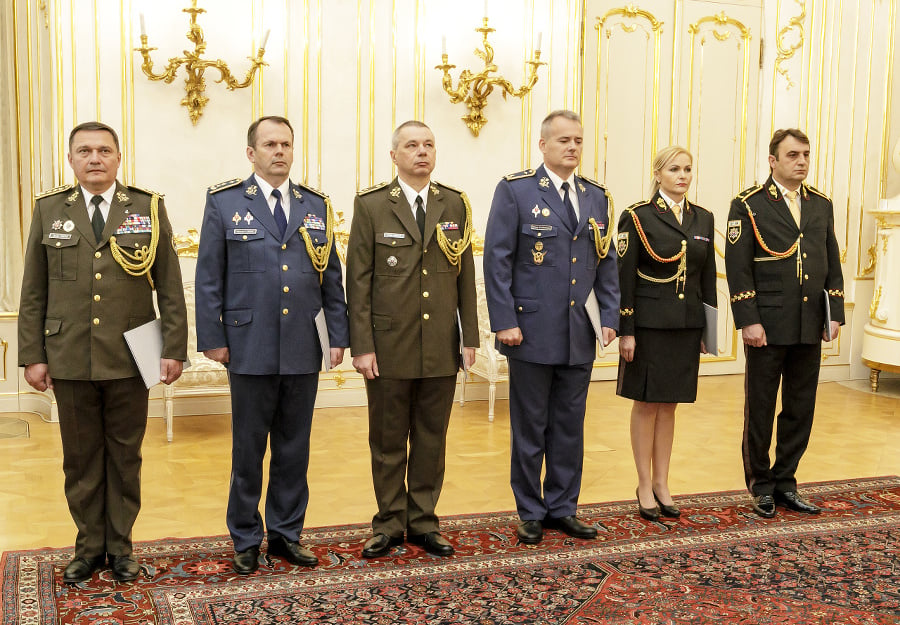
Service dress uniform

== Missions ==
As of 2025, Slovakia has 240 military personnel deployed in Cyprus for UNFICYP United Nations led peace support operations, 50 troops deployed in Bosnia and Herzegovina for EUFOR Althea and 135 troops deployed in Latvia for NATO Enhanced Forward Presence.

The country has been an active participant in US- and NATO-led military actions and involved in many United Nations peacekeeping military missions: UNPROFOR in the Yugoslavia (1992–1995), UNOMUR in Uganda and Rwanda (1993–1994), UNAMIR in Rwanda (1993–1996), UNTAES in Croatia (1996–1998), UNOMIL in Liberia (1993–1997), MONUA in Angola (1997–1999), SFOR in Bosnia and Herzegovina (1999–2003), OSCE mission in Moldova (1998–2002), OSCE mission in Albania (1999), KFOR in Kosovo (1999–2002), UNGCI in Iraq (2000–2003), UNMEE in Ethiopia and Eritrea (2000–2004), UNMISET in East Timor (2001), EUFOR Concordia in Macedonia (2003), UNAMSIL in Sierra Leone (1999–2005), EU supporting action to African Union in Darfur (2006), Operation Enduring Freedom in Afghanistan (2002–2005), Operation Iraqi Freedom in Iraq (2003–2007), UNDOF at the borders of Israel and Syria (1998–2008) .

Since the independence of Slovakia in 1993, there have been 60 uniformed personnel deaths in the line of service to the United Nations and NATO (as of 30 April 2018).

== Gallery ==
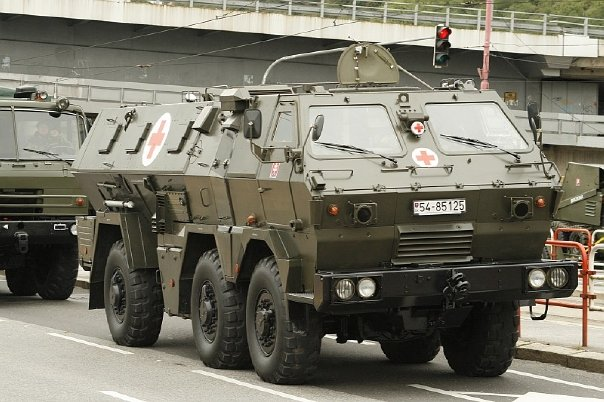
Armoured vehicle Tatrapan

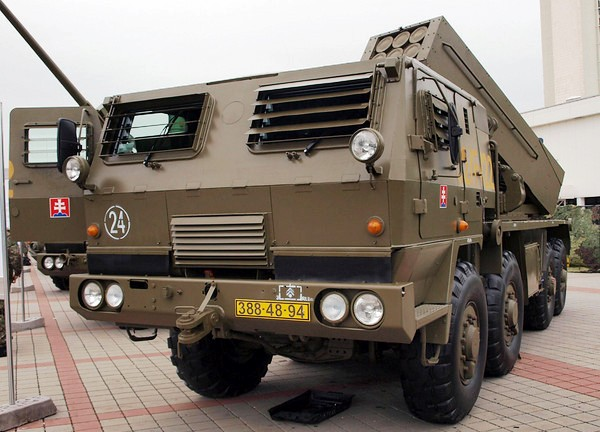
Multiple rocket launcher RM-70 MODULAR

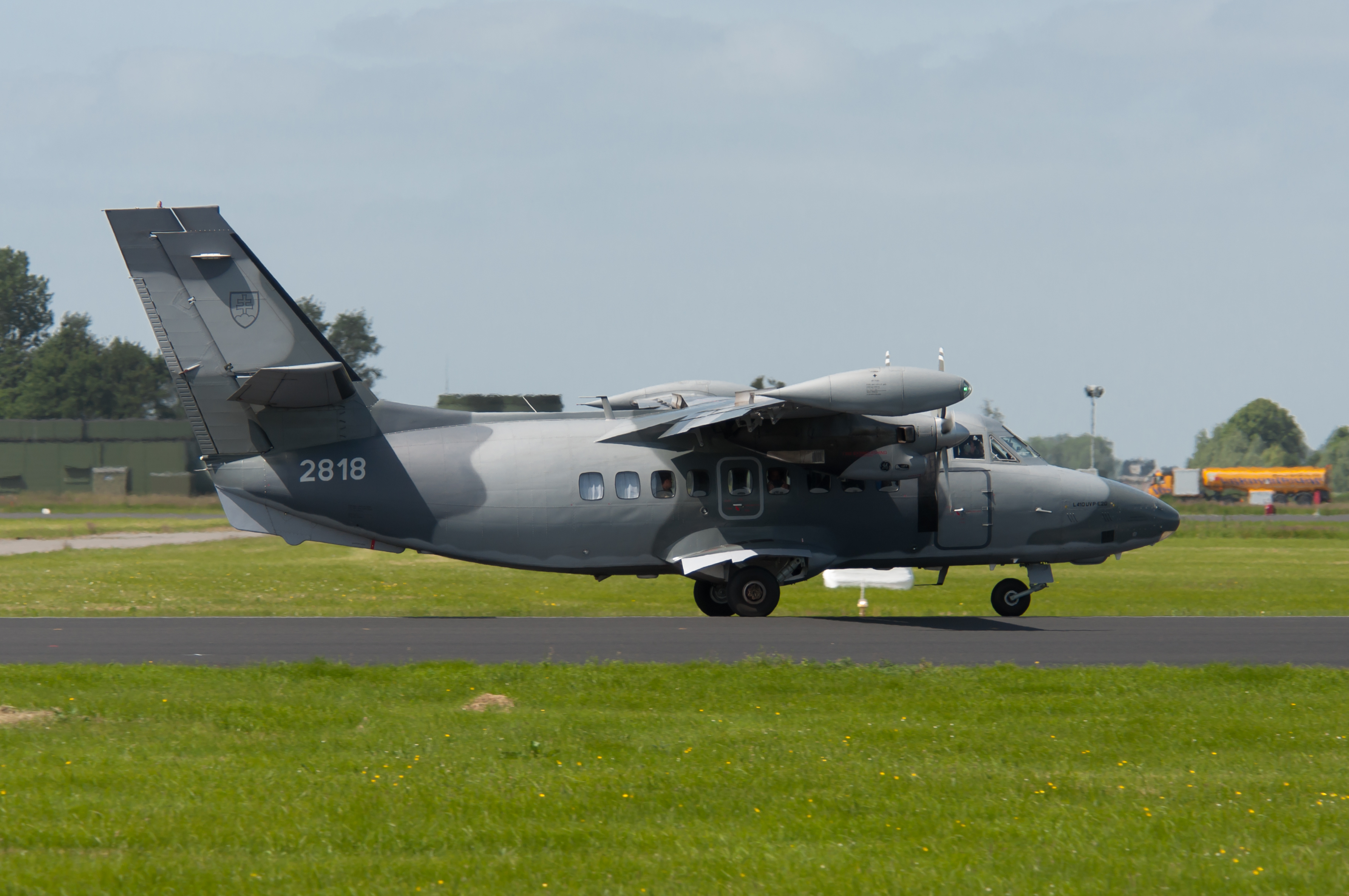
A Let L-410 Turbolet of the Slovak Air Force

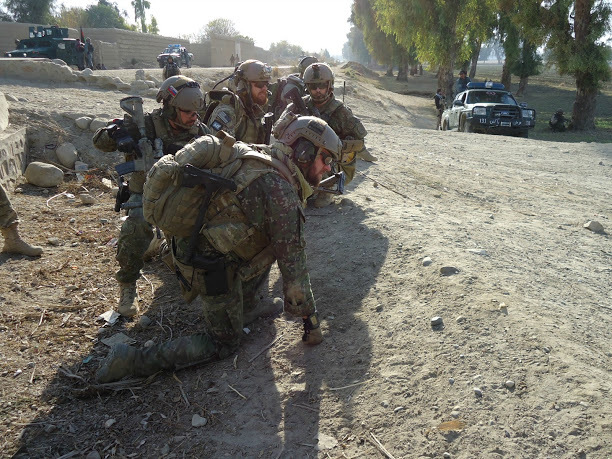
Slovak 5th Special Forces Regiment operating in eastern Afghanistan

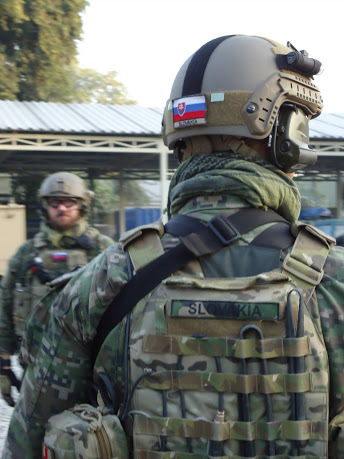
In eastern Afghanistan operation

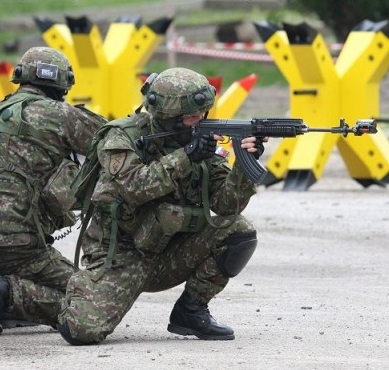
Soldiers of the 12th Mechanized Battalion

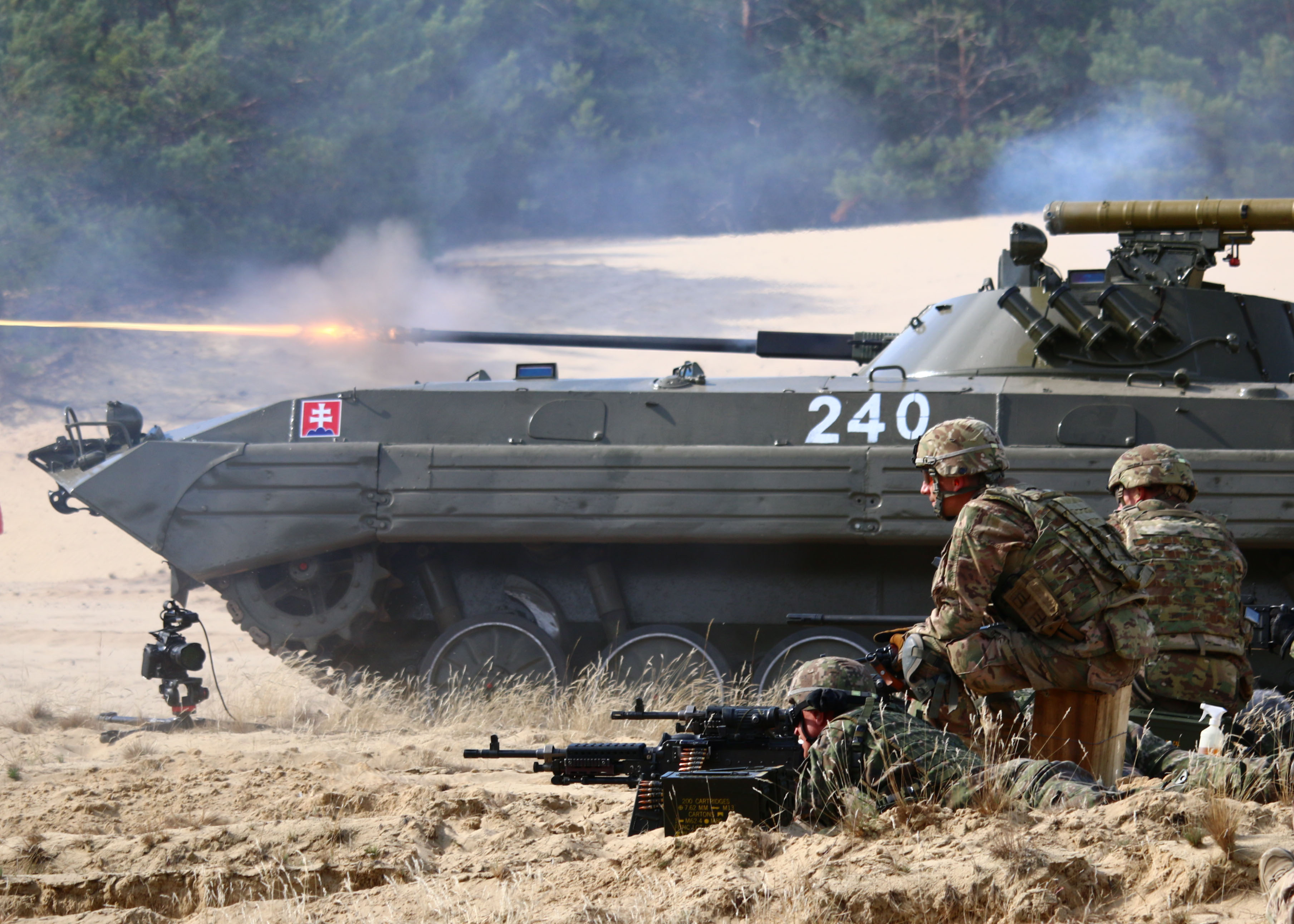
Slovak and U.S. Soldiers join forces during a live-fire exercise Sept. 16, 2015 near Bratislava in the Slovak Republic

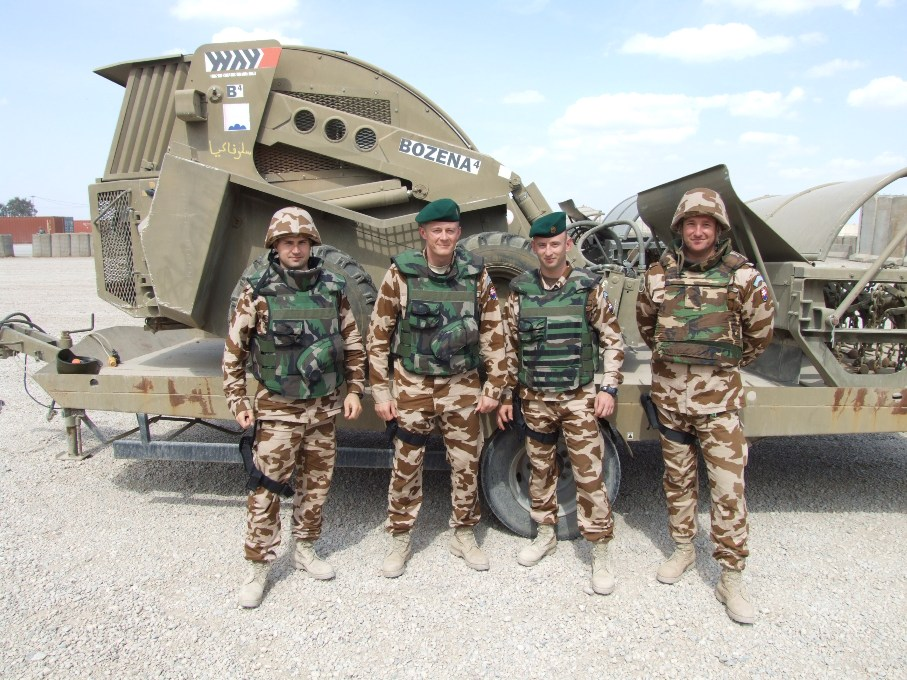
Slovak Bozena vehicle is designed for clearance of all conventional antipersonnel and antitank land mines and for IED removal assistance

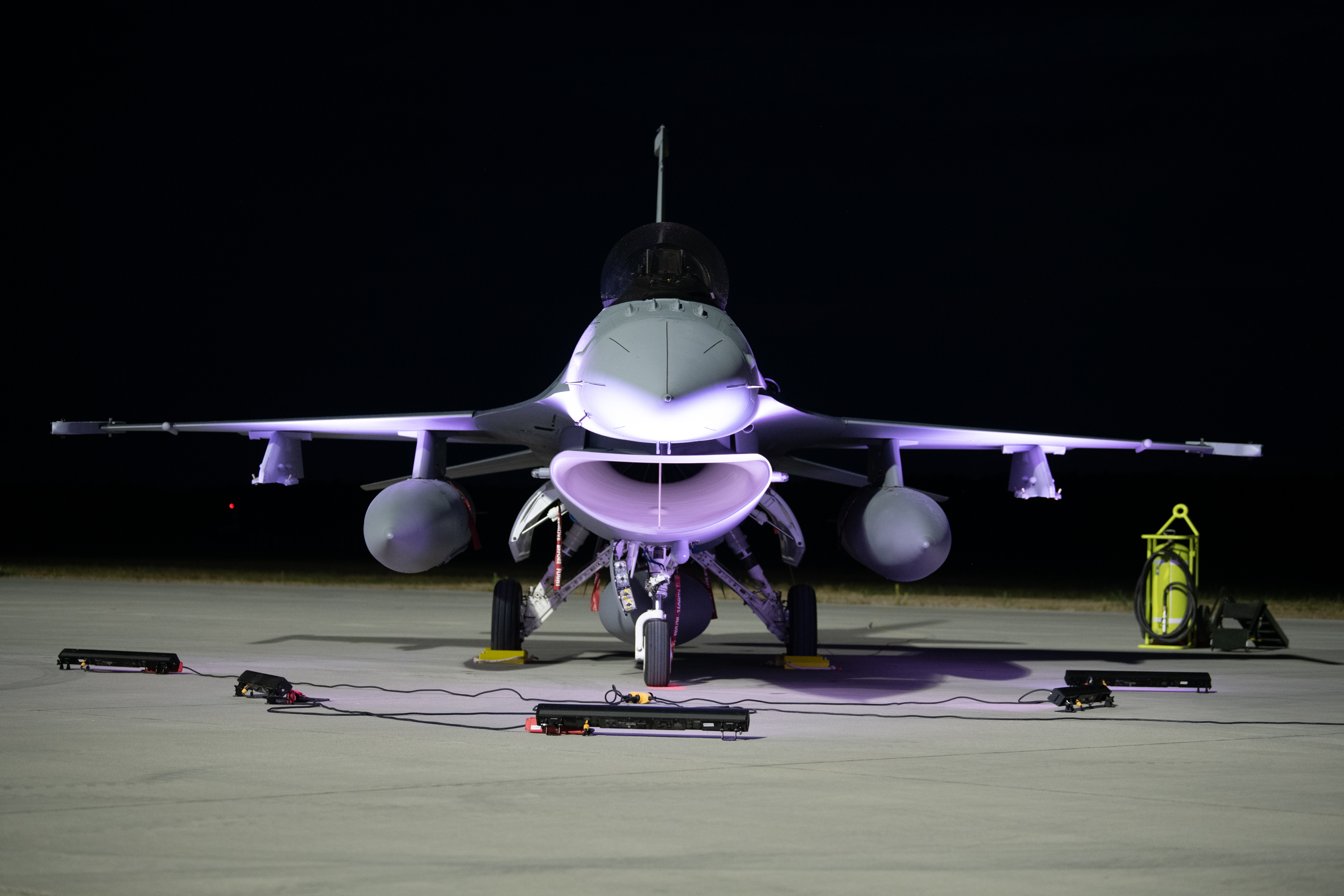
Slovak Air Force F-16 Block 70/72

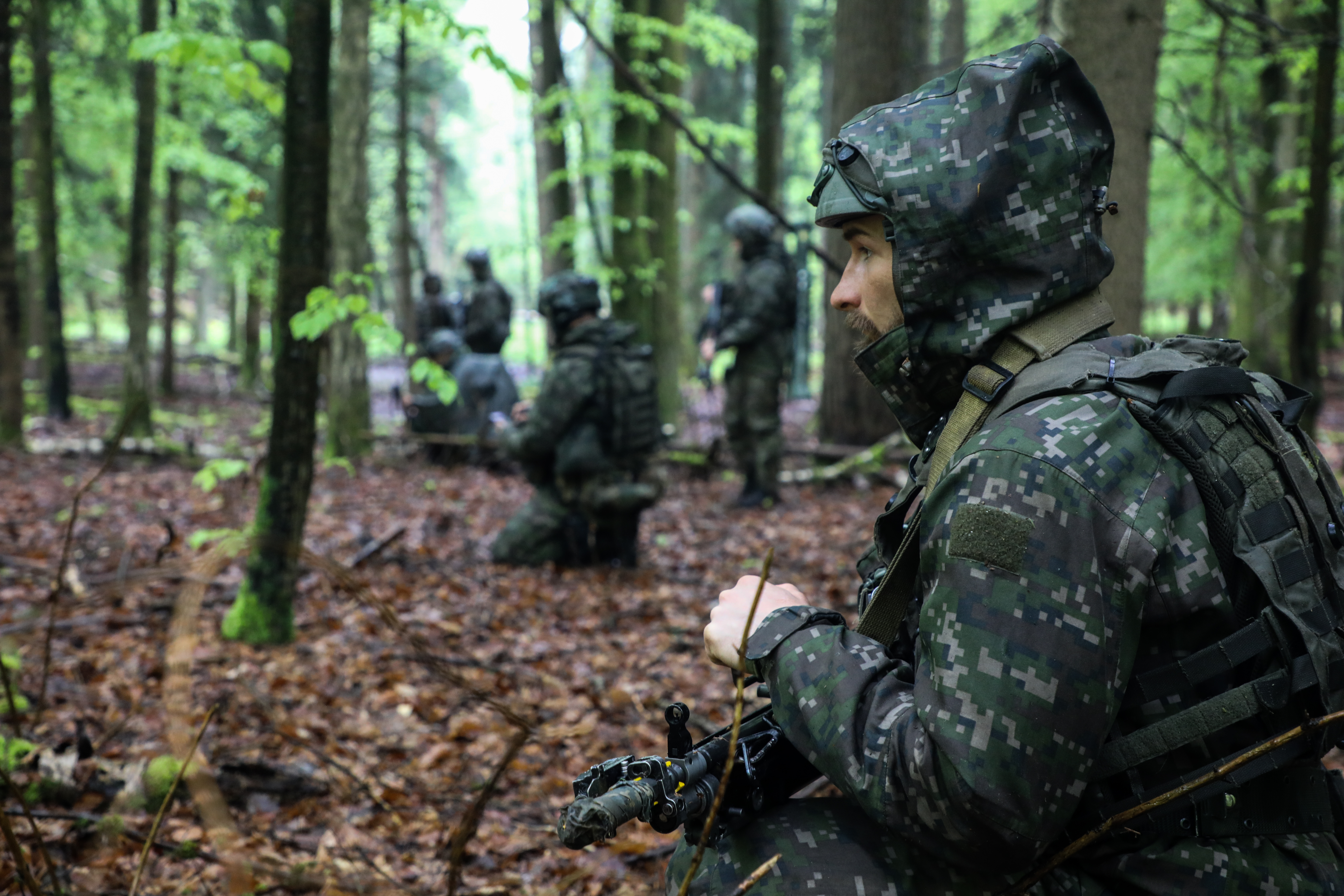
Slovak soldiers on training exercise in Germany

== See also ==
- Slovak National Uprising
- Slovak Ministry of Defence
- NATO Enhanced Forward Presence
