= Slovak Special Operations Forces =

Part of the Slovak Armed Forces

The Special Operations Forces (Slovak: Sily pre špeciálne operácie) are part of the Slovak Armed Forces at the level of the Ground and Air Forces. The Special Operations Forces Command (VeSŠO) was established on June 1, 2019. It is based in Trenčín. Colonel Jaroslav Krám is the commander since 2022.

The main purpose of the Forces is "military assistance, special reconnaissance and direct action", via psychological operations and civil-military co-operation.

== Subordinate units ==
As of 2024, the following units are assigned to the Slovak Special Operations Forces:

- 5th Special Operations Regiment, in Žilina
- 51st Training Base, in Žilina
- 52nd Airborne Battalion, in Jamník
- 57th Separate Regiment, in Martin (CIMIC and PSYOPS)

== Command ==
The first commander was Colonel Bc. Ing. Branislav Benka, previously the head of the Department of Special Purpose Forces at the Ministry of Defence. Since 2022, the commander has been Colonel Jaroslav Krám, who was previously the Deputy Commander of the Forces.

The first commanding non-commissioned officer was Staff Sergeant-Major Martin Boháčik, who had been the commanding non-commissioned officer of the 5th Special Purpose Regiment for more than 11 years until then. He was replaced by Imrich Fekete in 2023.
