= Manasterz, Przeworsk County =

Manasterz
- Village
- Location within Poland
- Coordinates: 49°57′N 22°22′E
- Country: Poland
- Voivodeship: Subcarpathian
- County: Przeworsk
- Gmina: Jawornik Polski

Manasterz [maˈnastɛʂ] is a village in the administrative district of Gmina Jawornik Polski, within Przeworsk County, Subcarpathian Voivodeship, in south-eastern Poland.
