= Hucisko Jawornickie =

- Village
- Location within Poland
- Coordinates: 49°54′N 22°21′E
- Country: Poland
- Voivodeship: Subcarpathian
- County: Przeworsk
- Gmina: Jawornik Polski

Hucisko Jawornickie [xuˈt͡ɕiskɔ javɔrˈɲit͡skʲɛ] is a village in the administrative district of Gmina Jawornik Polski, within Przeworsk County, Subcarpathian Voivodeship, in south-eastern Poland.

== Gallery ==
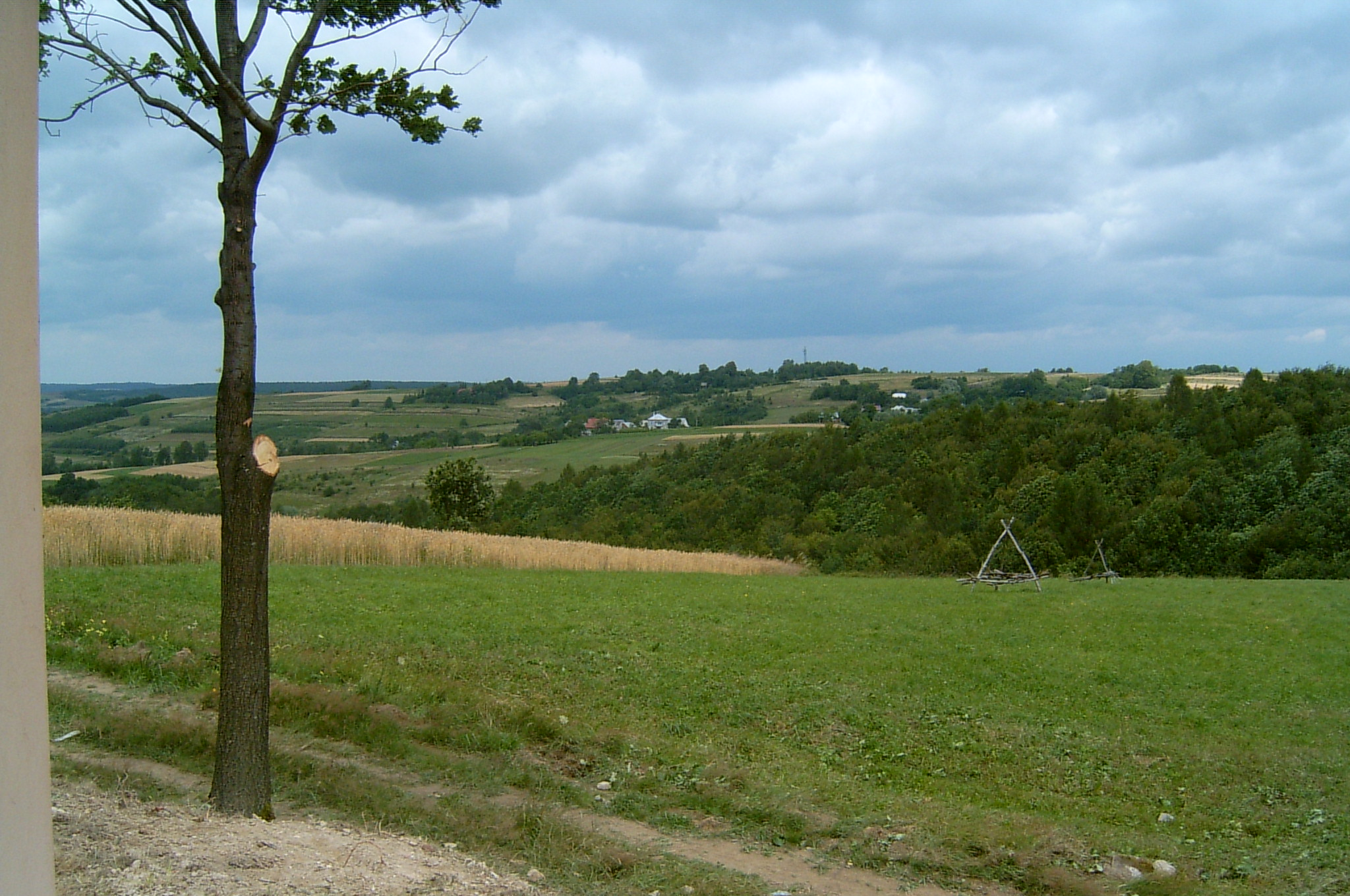

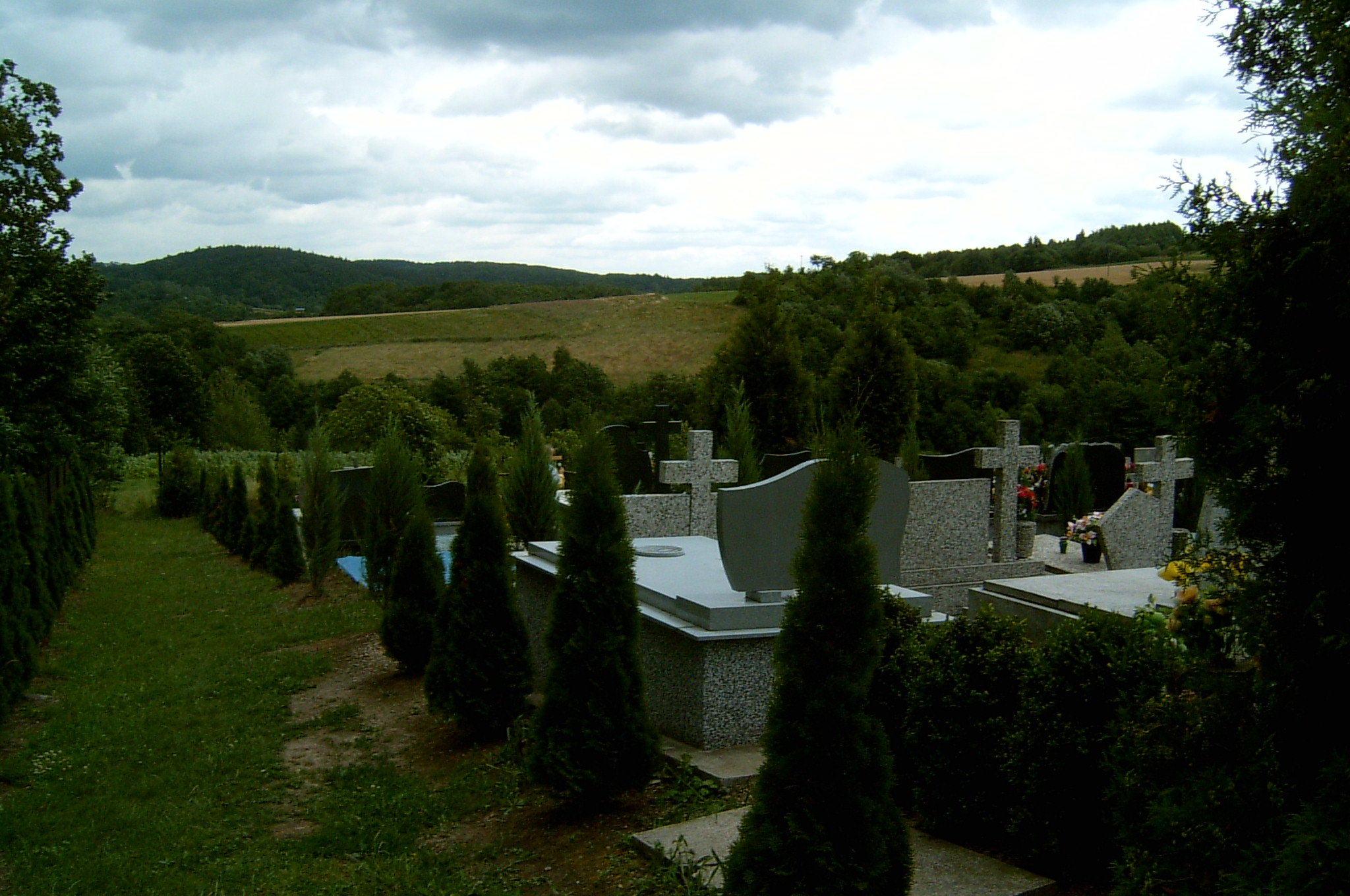

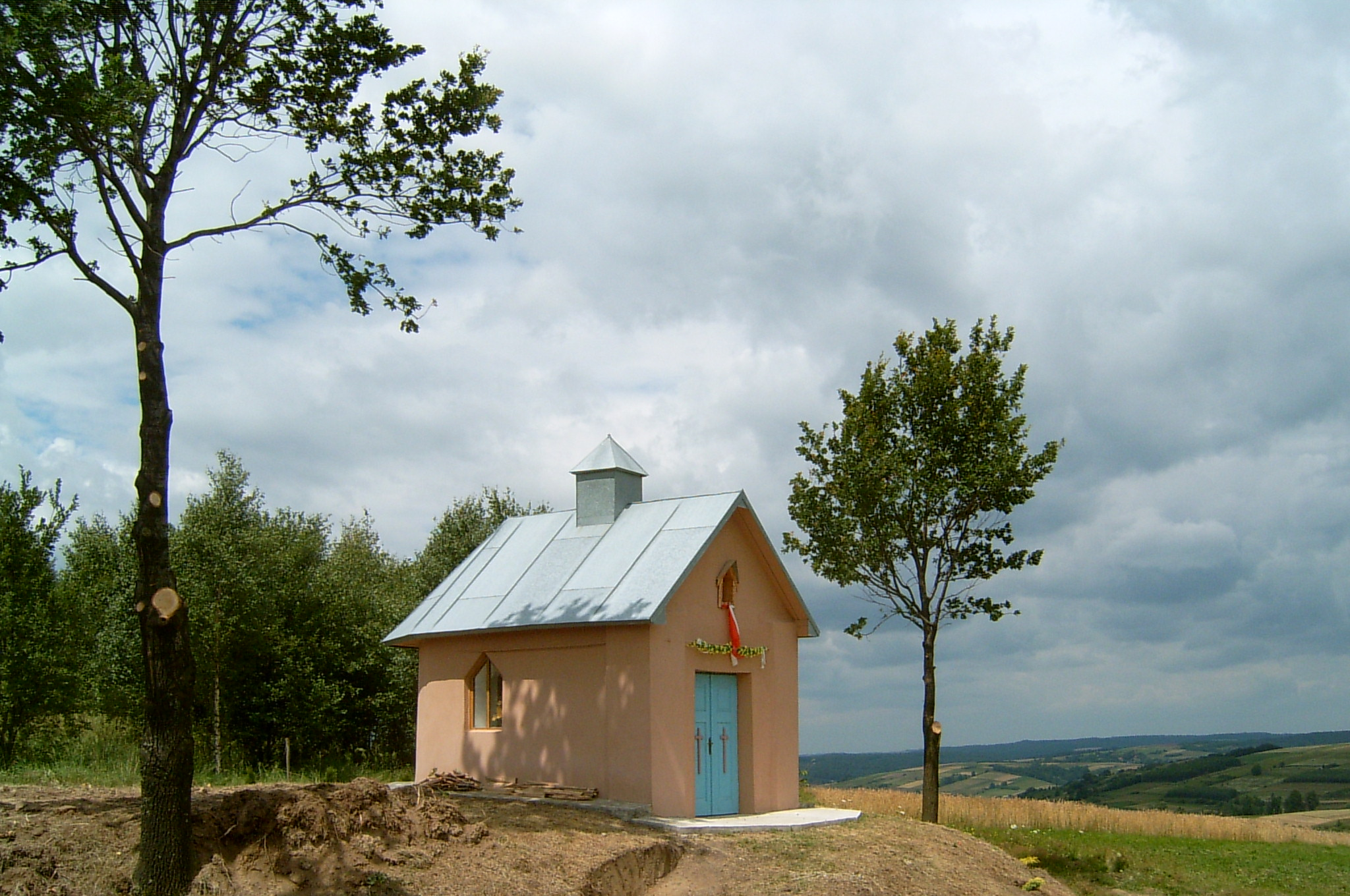
