= 5th Special Operations Regiment (Slovakia) =

Slovak Armed Forces special operations unit

- 5. pluk špeciálneho určenia
- 5th Special Operations Regiment
- Active: Insignia
- Country: Slovakia
- Role: Special forces
- Size: ~450

Commanders
- Current commander: Major general Jaroslav Krám

The 5th Special Operations Regiment, (Slovak: 5. pluk špeciálneho určenia) is based in Žilina, and serves as the Slovak Armed Forces primary counter-terrorism and special operations unit. The unit is the main component of the newly created Special Operations Forces (SK SOCOM).

It has a strength of over 450 personnel, organized into a command and staff section, medical section, and seven detachments: three special purpose detachments, one special signal detachment, one intelligence support detachment, one combat support detachment and a training detachment. Each special purpose detachment has four ten-man teams composed of two officers, two medics, a radio operator, two snipers, an engineer, an operator, and a technician. These teams will then be specialized in special reconnaissance, Direct Action, communications, medicine, or demolitions/heavy weapons. The combat support detachment has a section of 9 snipers, a combat diver section, and an anti-tank section equipped with anti-tank missiles.

The 5. PŠU regularly trains with western special operations units, including the US Army's 10th Special Forces Group and the French 1er RPIMa. Since the unit's creation in 1994, 5. Pluk špeciálneho určenia has increasingly adopted western special forces techniques and equipment, and has, in recent years, been a participant in the EUFOR Althea, and since 2011 within ISAF War in Afghanistan (2001–2021).

== Weapons ==
- Glock 17
- M4 carbine
- Heckler & Koch MP5
- Heckler & Koch UMP
- Heckler & Koch HK416
- Heckler & Koch HK417
- FN Minimi
- Barrett M82
- M2 Browning
- M320 Grenade Launcher Module

== Vehicles ==
- Iveco LMV 10
- HMMWV 3+
- Polaris MRZR
