= Widaczów =

- Village
- Location within Poland
- Coordinates: 49°55′N 22°19′E
- Country: Poland
- Voivodeship: Subcarpathian
- County: Przeworsk
- Gmina: Jawornik Polski
- Population: 330

Widaczów [vʲiˈdat͡ʂuf] is a village in the administrative district of Gmina Jawornik Polski, within Przeworsk County, Subcarpathian Voivodeship, in south-eastern Poland.
