= Jawornik-Przedmieście =

- Village
- Location within Poland
- Coordinates: 49°53′07″N 22°16′36″E
- Country: Poland
- Voivodeship: Podkarpackie
- County: Przeworsk
- Gmina: Jawornik Polski

Jawornik-Przedmieście [jaˈvɔrɲik pʂɛdˈmʲɛɕt͡ɕɛ] is a village in the administrative district of Gmina Jawornik Polski, within Przeworsk County, Podkarpackie Voivodeship, in south-eastern Poland.
