= Jaszczurowa, Lesser Poland Voivodeship =

Jaszczurowa
- Village
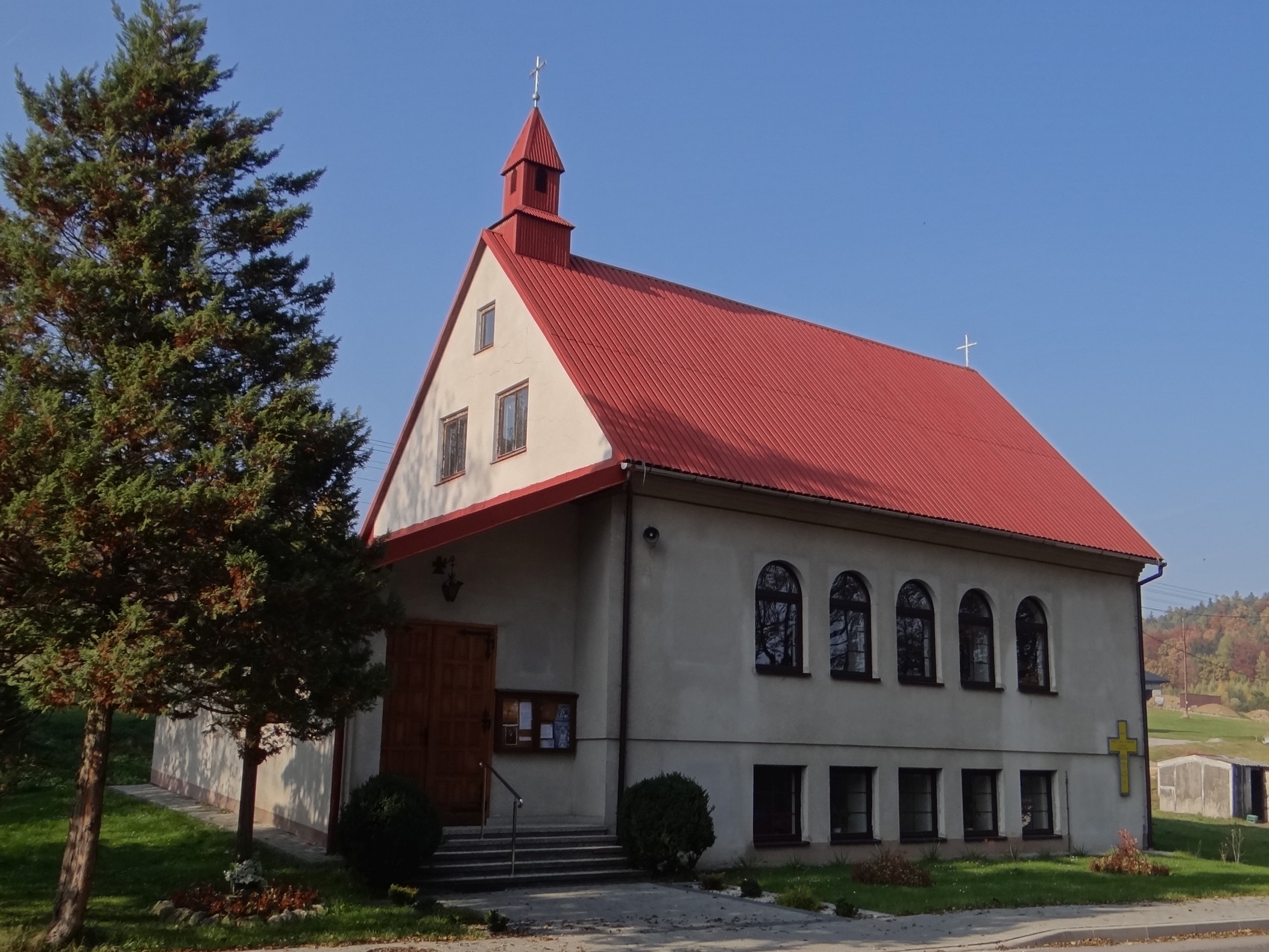
- Church in Jaszczurowa

- Location within Poland
- Coordinates: 49°49′N 19°33′E
- Country: Poland
- Voivodeship: Lesser Poland
- County: Wadowice
- Gmina: Mucharz
- Population: 1,000

Jaszczurowa [jaʂt͡ʂuˈrɔva] is a village in the administrative district of Gmina Mucharz, within Wadowice County, Lesser Poland Voivodeship, in southern Poland.

The place was established probably after 1333 and was first mentioned in 1389 as a private village in the Duchy of Auschwitz.
