= Skawce =

- Village
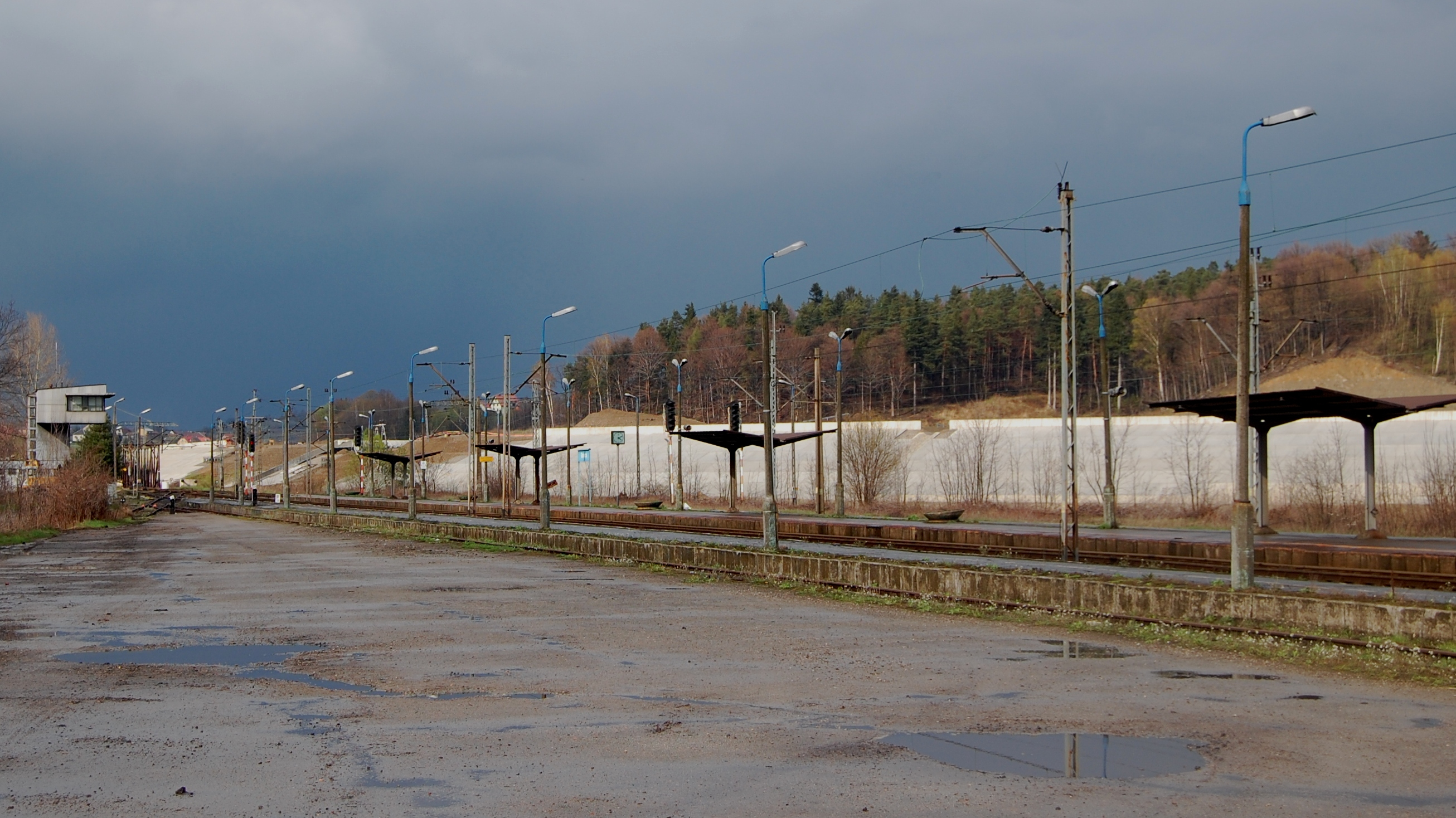
- Defunct train station

- Location within Poland
- Coordinates: 49°48′N 19°35′E
- Country: Poland
- Voivodeship: Lesser Poland
- County: Wadowice
- Gmina: Mucharz

Skawce [ˈskaft͡sɛ] is a village in the administrative district of Gmina Mucharz, within Wadowice County, Lesser Poland Voivodeship, in southern Poland.
