= Hadle Kańczuckie =

- Village
- Location within Poland
- Coordinates: 49°55′16″N 22°17′14″E
- Country: Poland
- Voivodeship: Subcarpathian
- County: Przeworsk
- Gmina: Jawornik Polski

Hadle Kańczuckie [ˈxadlɛ kaɲˈt͡ʂut͡skʲɛ] is a village in the administrative district of Gmina Jawornik Polski, within Przeworsk County, Subcarpathian Voivodeship, in south-eastern Poland.
