= Jawornik Polski =

- Town
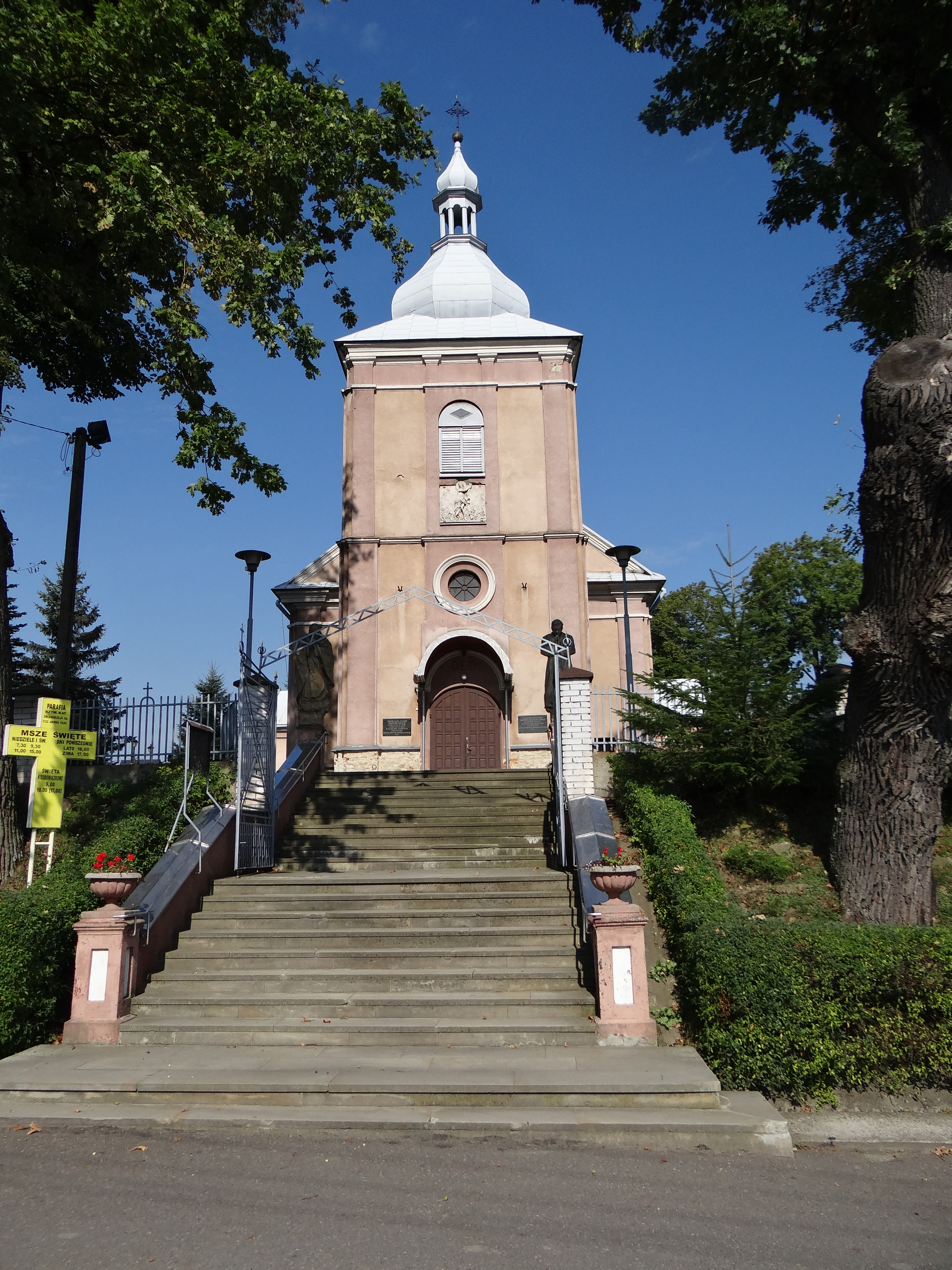
- Saint Andrew church in Jawornik Polski

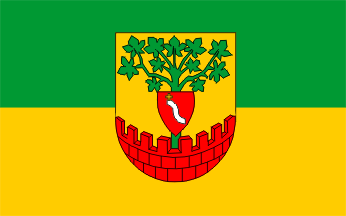
- Flag Coat of arms

- Location within Poland
- Coordinates: 49°53′22″N 22°16′19″E
- Country: Poland
- Voivodeship: Subcarpathian
- County: Przeworsk
- Gmina: Jawornik Polski
- First mentioned: 1448
- Time zone: UTC+1 (CET)
  - Summer (DST): UTC+2 (CEST)
- Vehicle registration: RPZ

Jawornik Polski [jaˈvɔrɲik ˈpɔlskʲi] is a town in Przeworsk County, Subcarpathian Voivodeship, in south-eastern Poland. It is the seat of the gmina (administrative district) called Gmina Jawornik Polski.
