= Gmina Jawornik Polski =

Gmina Jawornik Polski Jawornik Polski Commune
- Gmina
- Coat of arms
- Interactive map of Gmina Jawornik Polski
- Coordinates (Jawornik Polski): 49°53′22″N 22°16′19″E
- Country: Poland
- Voivodeship: Subcarpathian
- County: Przeworsk
- Seat: Jawornik Polski

Area
  - Total: 62.92 km^{2} (24.29 sq mi)

Population (2011)
  - Total: 4,648
  - Density: 73.87/km^{2} (191.3/sq mi)
- Website: http://www.jawornikpolski.itl.pl

Gmina Jawornik Polski is a rural gmina (administrative district) in Przeworsk County, Subcarpathian Voivodeship, in south-eastern Poland. Its seat is the village of Jawornik Polski, which lies approximately 26 kilometres (16 mi) south-west of Przeworsk and 25 km (16 mi) south-east of the regional capital Rzeszów.

The gmina covers an area of 62.92 square kilometres (24.3 sq mi), and as of 2006 its total population is 4,803 (4,648 in 2011).

== Villages ==
Gmina Jawornik Polski contains the villages and settlements of Hadle Kańczuckie, Hadle Szklarskie, Hucisko Jawornickie, Jawornik Polski, Jawornik Przedmieście, Manasterz, Widaczów and Zagórze.

== Neighbouring gminas ==
Gmina Jawornik Polski is bordered by the gminas of Dubiecko, Dynów, Hyżne, Kańczuga and Markowa.
