= Świnna Poręba =

- Village
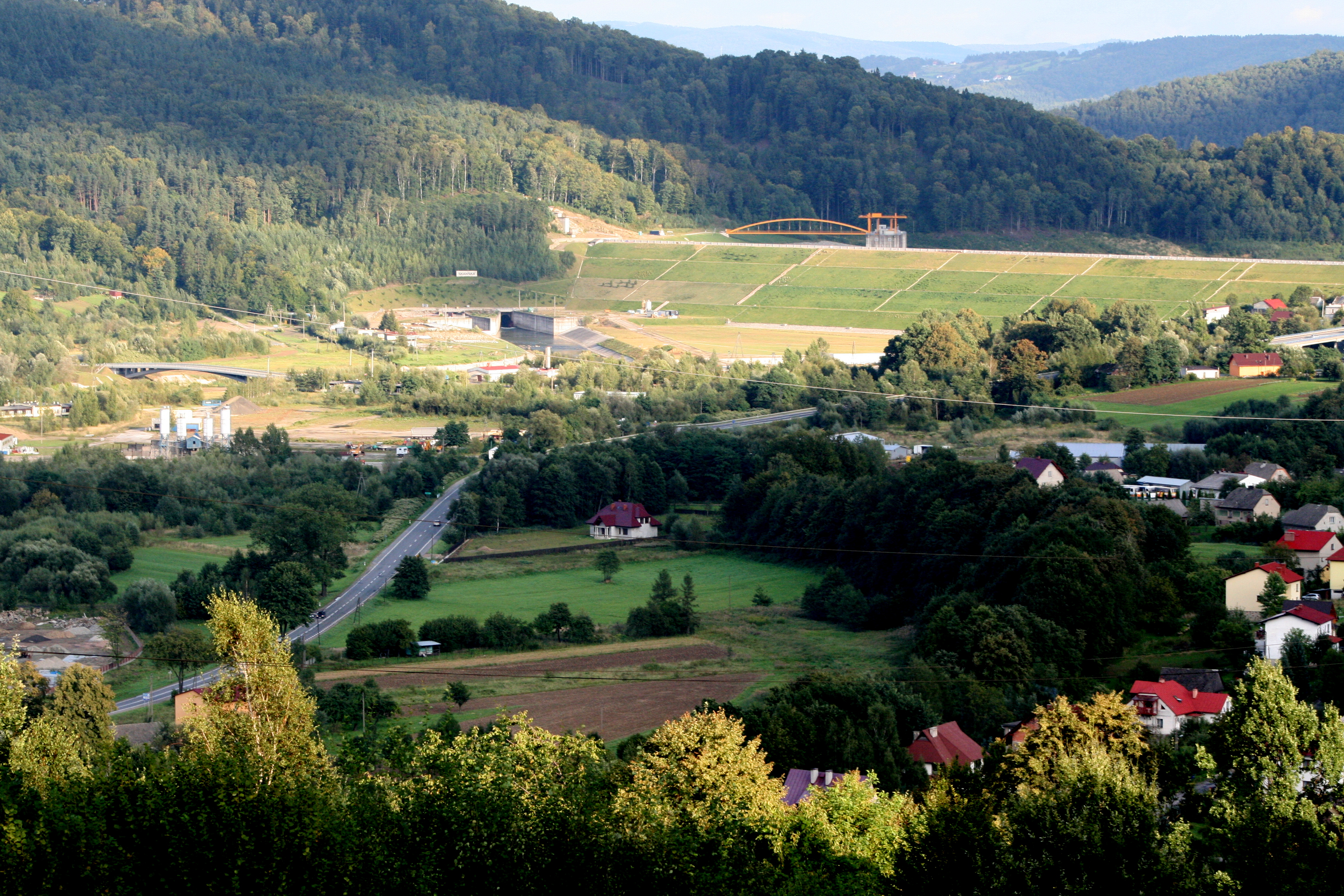

- Location within Poland
- Coordinates: 49°50′0″N 19°31′19″E
- Country: Poland
- Voivodeship: Lesser Poland
- County: Wadowice
- Gmina: Mucharz

Świnna Poręba [ˈɕfinna pɔˈrɛmba] is a village in the administrative district of Gmina Mucharz, within Wadowice County, Lesser Poland Voivodeship, in southern Poland.
