= Gmina Mucharz =

Gmina Mucharz Mucharz Commune
- Gmina
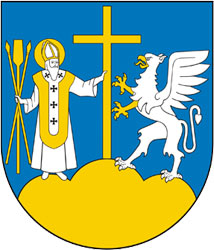
- Coat of arms
- Interactive map of Gmina Mucharz
- Coordinates (Mucharz): 49°49′N 19°33′E
- Country: Poland
- Voivodeship: Lesser Poland
- County: Wadowice
- Seat: Mucharz

Area
  - Total: 37.32 km^{2} (14.41 sq mi)

Population (2006)
  - Total: 3,878
  - Density: 103.9/km^{2} (269.1/sq mi)
- Website: http://www.mucharz.pl

Gmina Mucharz is a rural gmina (administrative district) in Wadowice County, Lesser Poland Voivodeship, in southern Poland. Its seat is the village of Mucharz, which lies approximately 9 kilometres (6 mi) south-east of Wadowice and 39 km (24 mi) south-west of the regional capital Kraków.

The gmina covers an area of 37.32 square kilometres (14.4 sq mi), and as of 2006 its total population is 3,878.

== Villages ==
Gmina Mucharz contains the villages and settlements of Jamnik, Jaszczurowa, Koziniec, Mucharz, Skawce, Świnna Poręba and Zagórze.

== Neighbouring gminas ==
Gmina Mucharz is bordered by the gminas of Stryszów, Wadowice and Zembrzyce.
