= Mucharz =

- Village
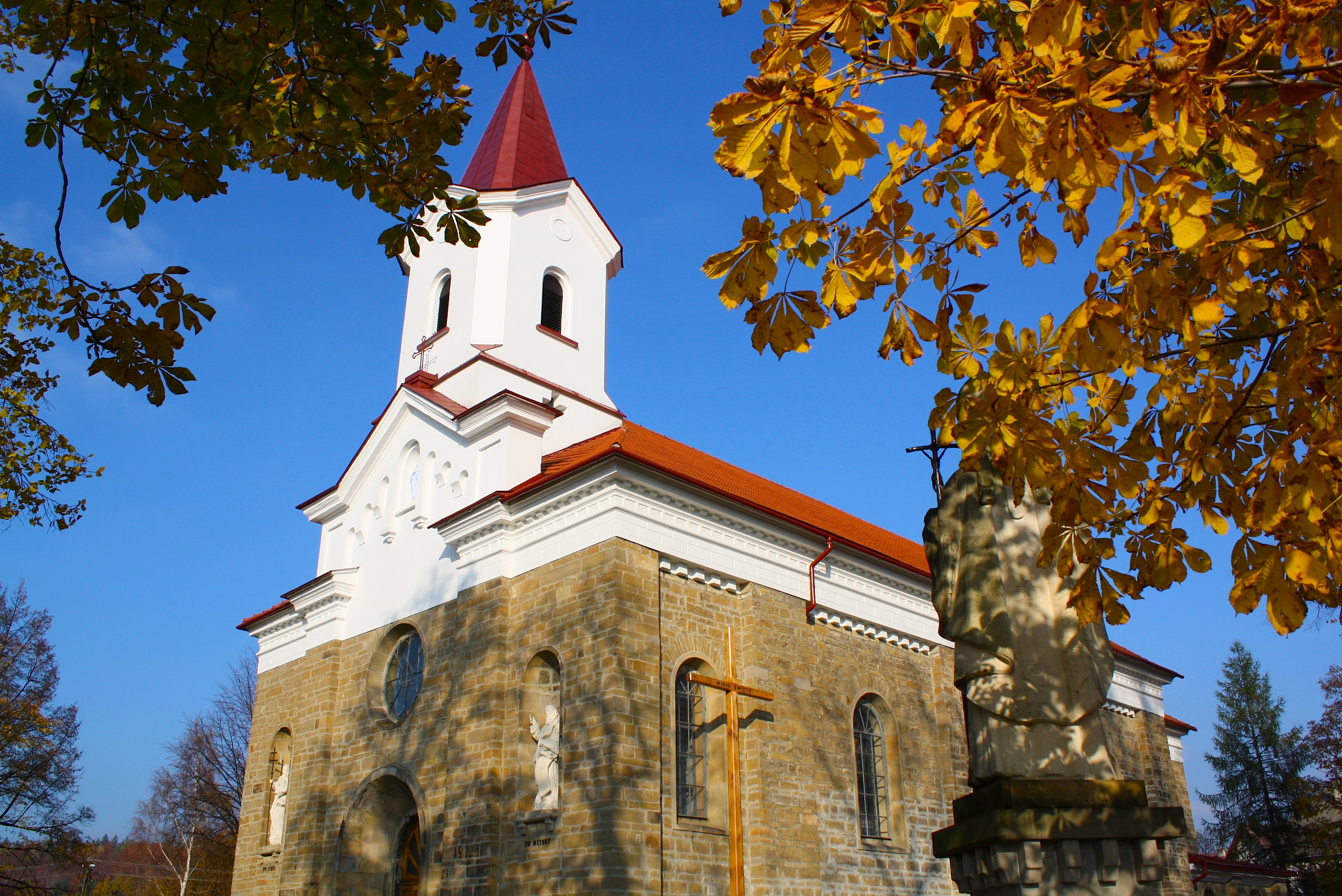
- Saint Adalbert Church

- Location within Poland
- Coordinates: 49°49′N 19°33′E
- Country: Poland
- Voivodeship: Lesser Poland
- County: Wadowice
- Gmina: Mucharz
- Population: 830
- Website: http://www.mucharz.pl

Mucharz [ˈmuxaʂ] is a village in Wadowice County, Lesser Poland Voivodeship, in southern Poland. It is the seat of the gmina (administrative district) called Gmina Mucharz.
