= Zagórze, Przeworsk County =

Zagórze
- Village
- Location within Poland
- Coordinates: 49°57′N 22°22′E
- Country: Poland
- Voivodeship: Subcarpathian
- County: Przeworsk
- Gmina: Jawornik Polski
- Time zone: UTC+1 (CET)
  - Summer (DST): UTC+2 (CEST)
- Vehicle registration: RPZ
- Website: http://zagorze-przeworskie.yoyo.pl/

Zagórze [zaˈɡuʐɛ] is a village in the administrative district of Gmina Jawornik Polski, within Przeworsk County, Subcarpathian Voivodeship, in south-eastern Poland.

Four Polish citizens were murdered by Nazi Germany in the village during World War II.
