= Zagórze (Rumia) =

District in Rumia, Pomeranian Voivodeship, Poland

- District of Rumia
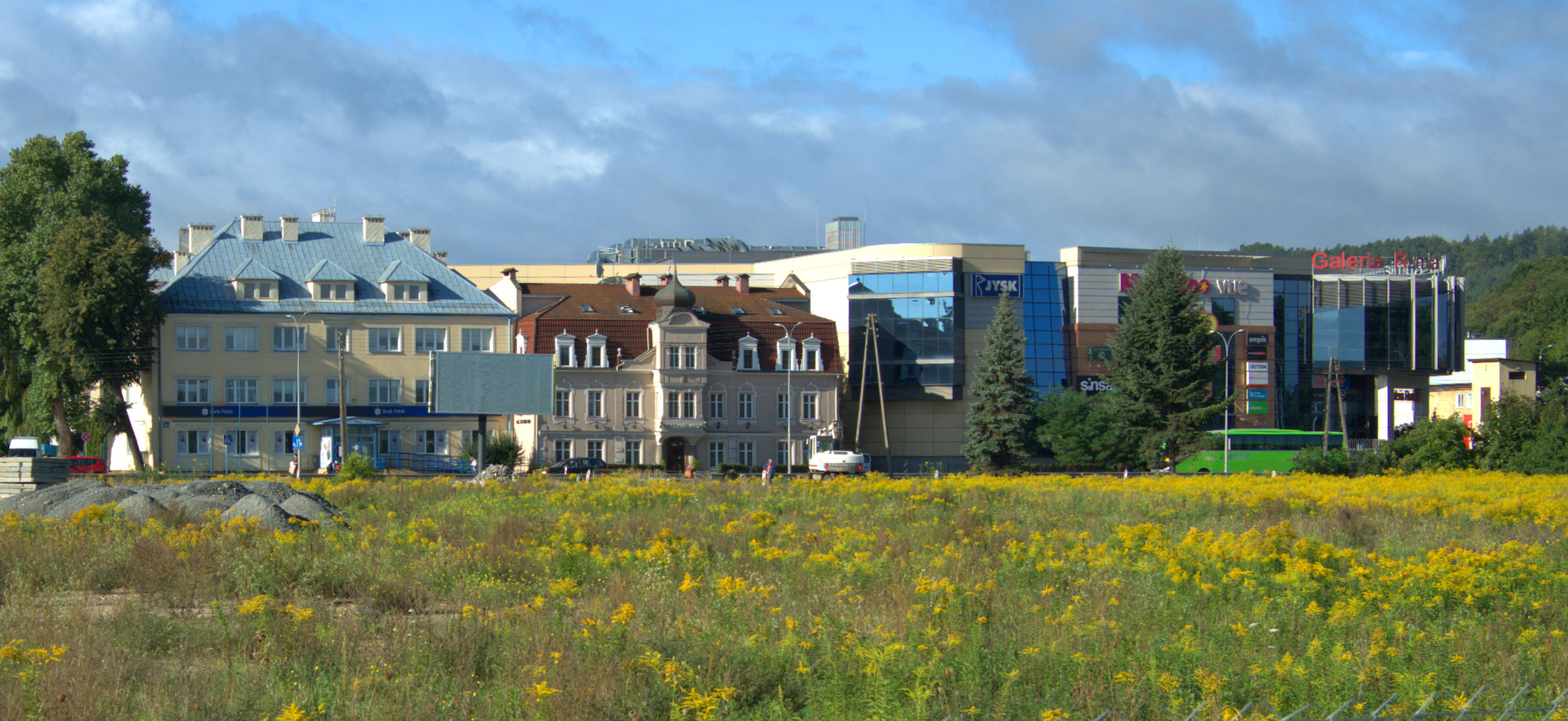
- Sobieskiego Street in Zagórze
- Interactive map of Zagórze
- Coordinates: 54°34′14″N 18°22′40″E
- Country: Poland
- Voivodeship: Pomeranian
- County: Wejherowo County
- Town: Rumia
- Time zone: UTC+1 (CET)
  - Summer (DST): UTC+2 (CEST)

Zagórze is the southernmost district of the town of Rumia, Poland, located in the valley of Zagórska Struga.
