= Jamnik, Lesser Poland Voivodeship =

Jamnik
- Village
- Location within Poland
- Coordinates: 49°49′10″N 19°31′9″E
- Country: Poland
- Voivodeship: Lesser Poland
- County: Wadowice
- Gmina: Mucharz

Jamnik [ˈjamnik] is a village in the administrative district of Gmina Mucharz, within Wadowice County, Lesser Poland Voivodeship, in southern Poland.
