= Koziniec, Lesser Poland Voivodeship =

Koziniec
- Village
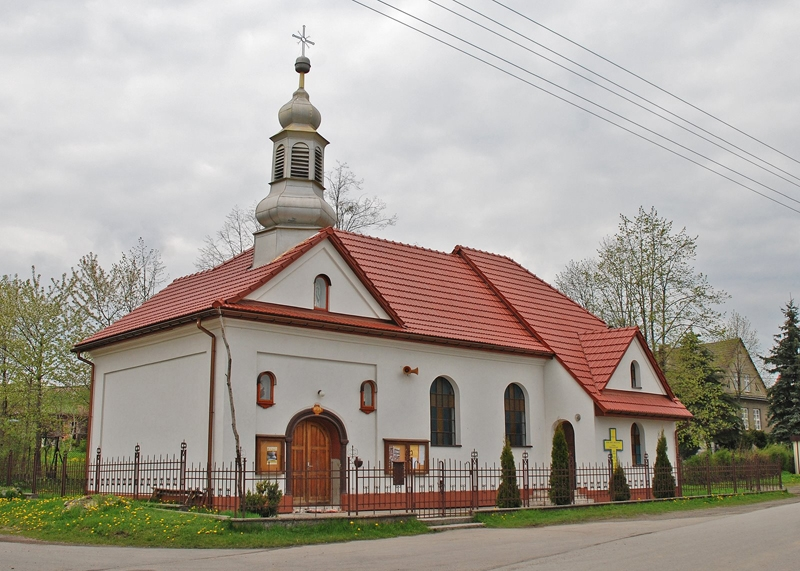
- Catholic chapel

- Location within Poland
- Coordinates: 49°50′N 19°30′E
- Country: Poland
- Voivodeship: Lesser Poland
- County: Wadowice
- Gmina: Mucharz

Koziniec [kɔˈʑiɲɛt͡s] is a village in the administrative district of Gmina Mucharz, within Wadowice County, Lesser Poland Voivodeship, in southern Poland.
