= Zagórze, Wadowice County =

Zagórze
- Village
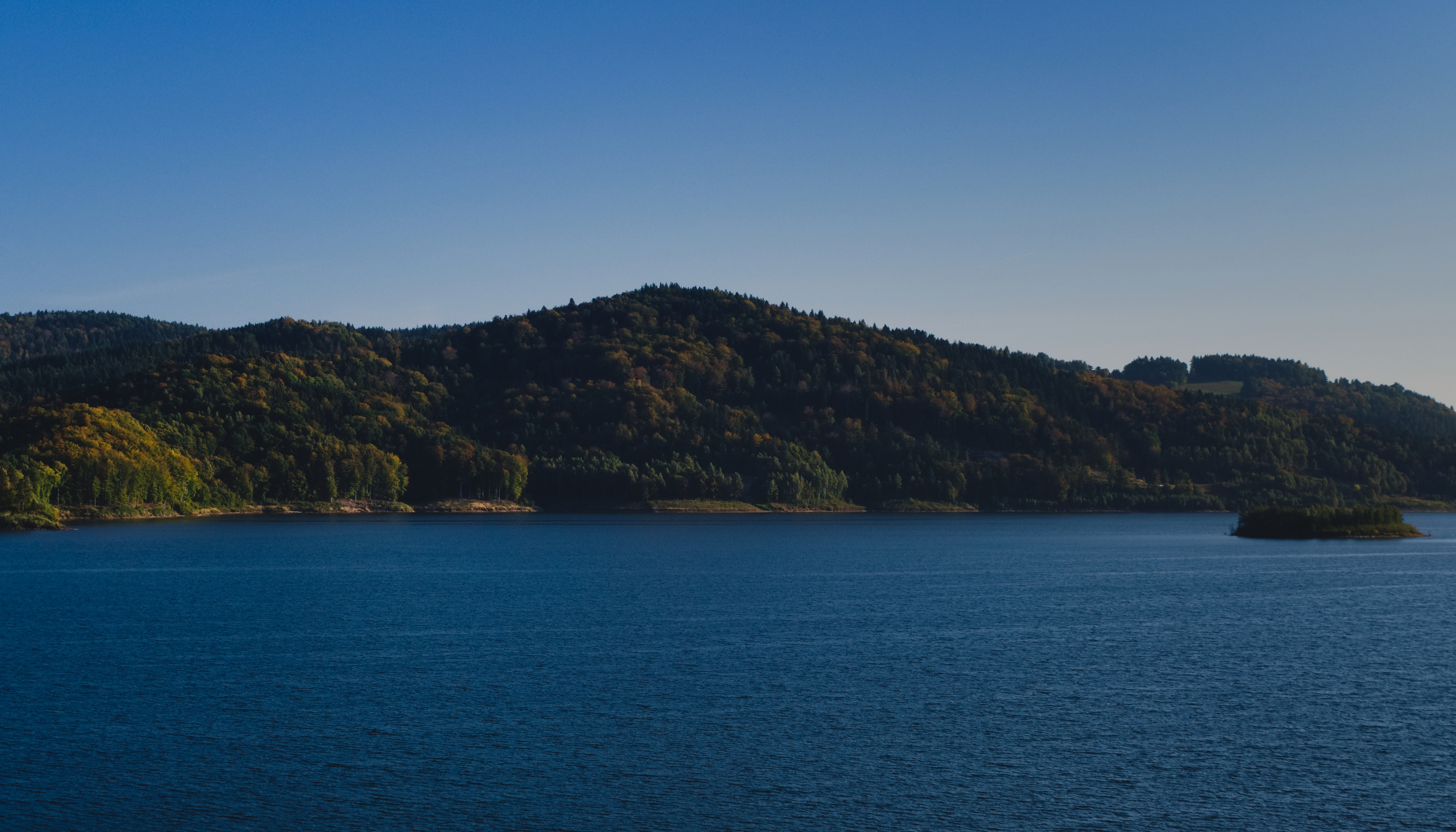
- Lake

- Location within Poland
- Coordinates: 49°50′N 19°34′E
- Country: Poland
- Voivodeship: Lesser Poland
- County: Wadowice
- Gmina: Mucharz

Zagórze [zaˈɡuʐɛ] is a village in the administrative district of Gmina Mucharz, within Wadowice County, Lesser Poland Voivodeship, in southern Poland.
