= Larysza coat of arms =

Polish coat of arms

Larysza
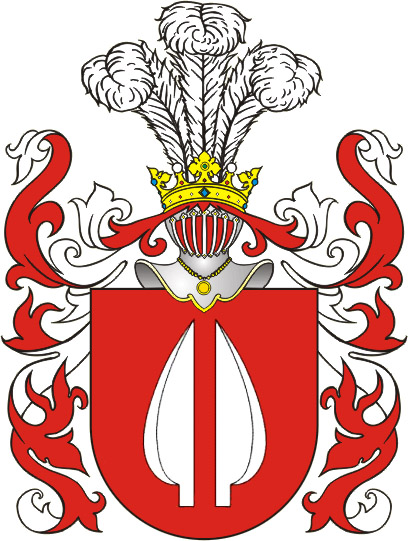
- Battle cry: Borys, Larysza
- Alternative name: Larissa
- Earliest mention: 1446
- Towns: none
- Families: 23 names altogether: *Sokalski (surname), Chocholaty, Chochołaty, Domański, Dumański, Karwin, Larisch, Lariss, Larson, Lebla, Łastowiecki, Madaleński, Madaliński, Mendalski, Męczalski, Niedzielski, Palimączyński, Perzanowski, Pyrzanowski, Reczyński,, Wnuczek, Zdanowski, Zdunowski

Larysza is a Polish coat of arms. It was used by several szlachta families in the times of the Polish–Lithuanian Commonwealth.

== History ==
There are supposed to be two plowshares standing side by side, with the points upward and the sharp ends of the blade facing each other, on a red shield. On the helmet there are three white ostrich feathers. Thus, it was described by several early modern heraldists:

- Joachim Bielski, in his Kronika Polska (1597), described it on page 184.
- Bartosz Paprocki, in his Gniazdo cnoty (1578), described it on page 402.
- Bartosz Paprocki, in his Herby Rycerztwa Polskiego (1584), described it on page 263.
- Szymon Okolski, in his Orbis Polonus (1641–1643), described it in Volume 2 on page 39.
- Szymon Okolski, in his Klejnoty, described it on page 36.

None of these authors found anything certain about when and why this coat of arms was conferred. Parisius in his manuscript infers that it got the name from Larissa, a city in Thessaly, before the birth of Christ. At that time the Sarmatians called the Mesians invaded Italy from the town of Larissa in Thessaly and captured many people as the spoils of war. Soon they were settled in Sarmatia, which had been little used previously because no one there knew how to farm the land, which turned out to be fertile. This seems to be somewhat corroborated by Ovid, book 3, Tristium Elegia 10, where he says of Sarmatia's lack of fertility at that time, "Aspiceres nudos, sineftonde, sine arbore campos, etc." [One sees fields bare of foliage or trees"]. This was the main reason for its fertility, and thus the plowshares appear in the coat of arms.

He also reports that the coat of arms was conferred at a time when the Sarmatians, irritated by the Romans' frequent raids, attacked Italy and captured several cities, leveling them, then plowing the land and sowing it with salt. The discoverers of this method received as an award a coat of arms with plowshares. At least, that is the conjecture Parisius made regarding the origin of this coat of arms.

Paprocki cites two opinions regarding the origin of these arms. First, when Piast had been elevated to the throne, he honored his mothers' relatives with this shield; Tylkowski In dedicat. attests to this, but Okolski thinks otherwise. Secondly, when Jaromir, the true prince of Bohemia, was fleeing from his brother Wratyslaw, he came to Boleslaw the Brave, King of Poland. Wratyslaw, not content with having driven his brother from Bohemia, took his army and pursued his brother into Poland. As Boleslaw was leading ail expedition against Wratyslaw, along the way he encountered a man who was carrying two plowshares to the blacksmith to be repaired. The King started talking to this man and learned that the man knew all the trails in the forest and promised to guide the King through it. The man proved to be instrumental in the King's victory, for he crept into the Bohemian camp before dawn. Finding the enemy asleep, he took away all their horses, after which Boleslaw attacked and easily conquered the horseless and still sleepy Bohemians. The King therefore allowed Laryssa, as the progenitor of this clan was supposedly named, to bear on his shield the plowshares he had been carrying.

Paprocki cites count Jankal Laryssa in his charters of 1264, as well as count Choschanus Larysza, cupbearer of Kalisz, in the same year. Paprocki also cites an anonymous source, reporting that under them, Jews received great privileges from this Duke.

== Notable bearers ==
Notable bearers of this coat of arms include:

- Antoni Madaliński, a general in Kościuszko Uprising (1794)
- Piotr Mediolański, crown treasurer and knight of Grand Duke of Lithuania Wladislaw II.

== See also ==
- Polish heraldry
- Heraldry
- Coat of arms
