= Jamník, Liptovský Mikuláš District =

Village and municipality in Slovakia

Jamník
- Municipality
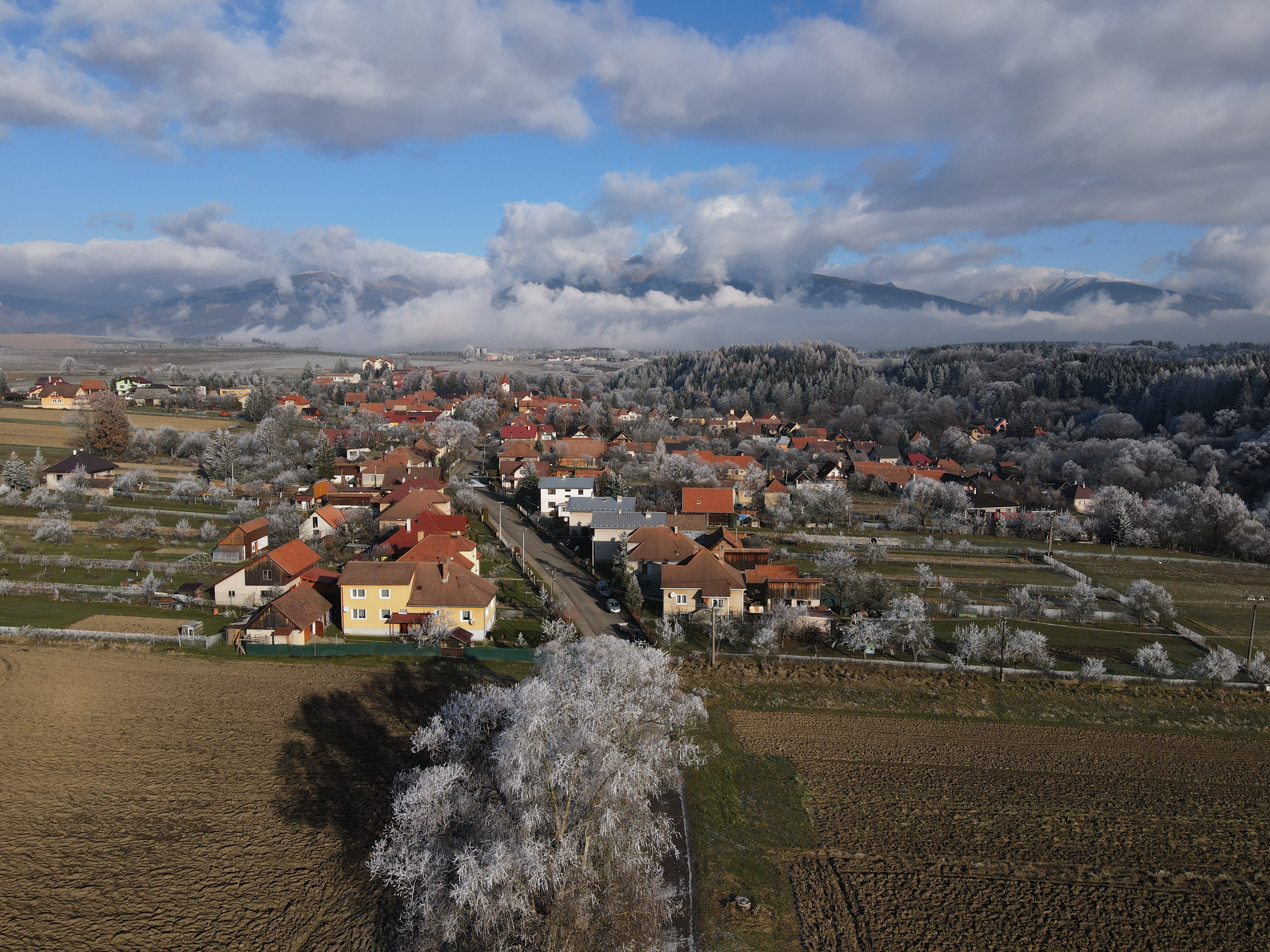

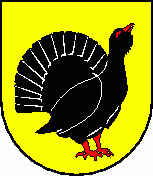
- Flag Coat of arms

- Location of Jamník in the Žilina Region Location of Jamník in Slovakia
- Coordinates: 49°04′20″N 19°42′36″E
- Country: Slovakia
- Region: Žilina Region
- District: Liptovský Mikuláš District
- First mentioned: 1346

Area
  - Total: 45.61 km^{2} (17.61 sq mi)
- Elevation: 684 m (2,244 ft)

Population (2025)
  - Total: 449
- Time zone: UTC+1 (CET)
  - Summer (DST): UTC+2 (CEST)
- Postal code: 330 1
- Area code: +421 44
- Vehicle registration plate (until 2022): LM
- Website: www.jamnik.sk

Jamník (Hungarian: Jamnik) is a village and municipality in Liptovský Mikuláš District in the Žilina Region of northern Slovakia.

== Etymology ==
Archaic Slovak jamník - a navvy. In this case probably meaning "a miner".

== History ==
In historical records the village was first mentioned in 1346 (Yemnik). Before the establishment of independent Czechoslovakia in 1918, it was part of Liptó County within the Kingdom of Hungary. From 1939 to 1945, it was part of the Slovak Republic.

== Geography ==
The municipality lies at an altitude of 684 metres (2,244 ft) and covers an area of 45.61 km^{2} (17.61 sq mi) (2025).

== Population ==
Population statistic (10 years)
Year	1995	2005	2015	2025
Count	376	443	450	449
Difference		+17.81%	+1.58%	−0.22%

Population statistic
Year	2024	2025
Count	462	449
Difference		−2.81%

It has a population of 449 people (31 December 2025).

=== Ethnicity ===
Census 2021 (1+ %)
Ethnicity	Number	Fraction
Slovak	450	94.33%
Not found out	20	4.19%
Czech	7	1.46%
Romani	5	1.04%
Total	477	

In year 2021 was 477 people by ethnicity 450 as Slovak, 20 as Not found out, 7 as Czech, 5 as Romani, 2 as Polish, 2 as Other, 1 as Rusyn, 1 as Austrian and 1 as French.

Note on population: The difference values of population numbers in the table "Population statistic" and in the sections "Ethnicity" & "Religion" is caused by the use of various statistical methods.

=== Religion ===
Census 2021 (1+ %)
Religion	Number	Fraction
Evangelical Church	210	44.03%
None	134	28.09%
Roman Catholic Church	95	19.92%
Not found out	19	3.98%
Greek Catholic Church	6	1.26%
Other	5	1.05%
Total	477	

In year 2021 was 477 people by religion 210 from Evangelical Church, 134 from None, 95 from Roman Catholic Church, 19 from Not found out, 6 from Greek Catholic Church, 5 from Other, 2 from Islam, 2 from Buddhism, 2 from Ad hoc movements, 1 from Christian Congregations in Slovakia and 1 from Church of the Brethren.

== Genealogical resources ==
The records for genealogical research are available at the state archive "Statny Archiv in Bytca, Slovakia"

- Roman Catholic church records (births/marriages/deaths): 1698-1951 (parish B)
- Lutheran church records (births/marriages/deaths): 1784-1926 (parish B)

== See also ==
- List of municipalities and towns in Slovakia
