= Bydgoszcz Timber Port =

Historical timber port in Bydgoszcz, Poland

Coordinates: 53°06′59″N 18°07′14″E

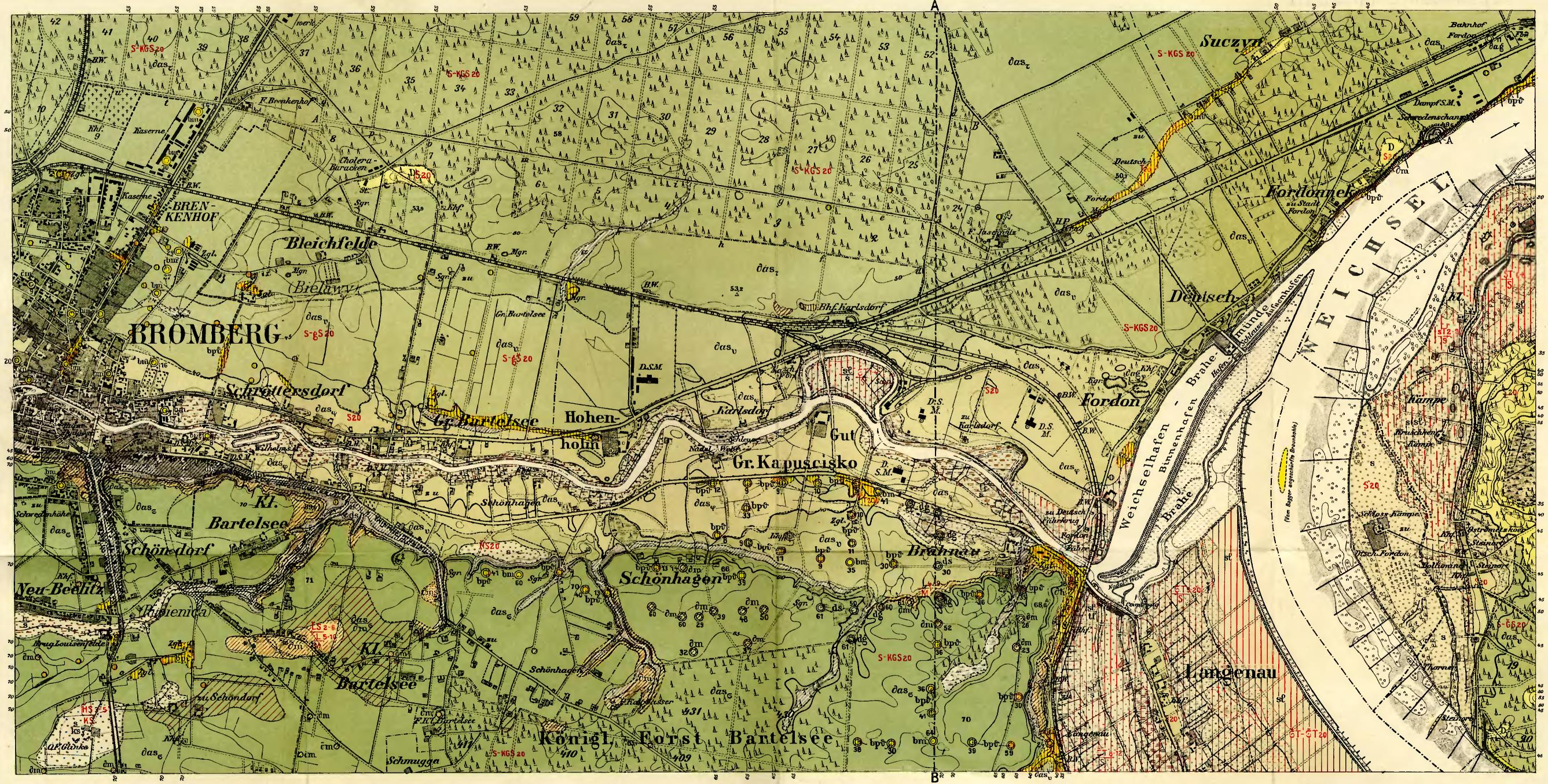
Map from 1902 showing the first Timber Port after the canalization of the Brda in 1879

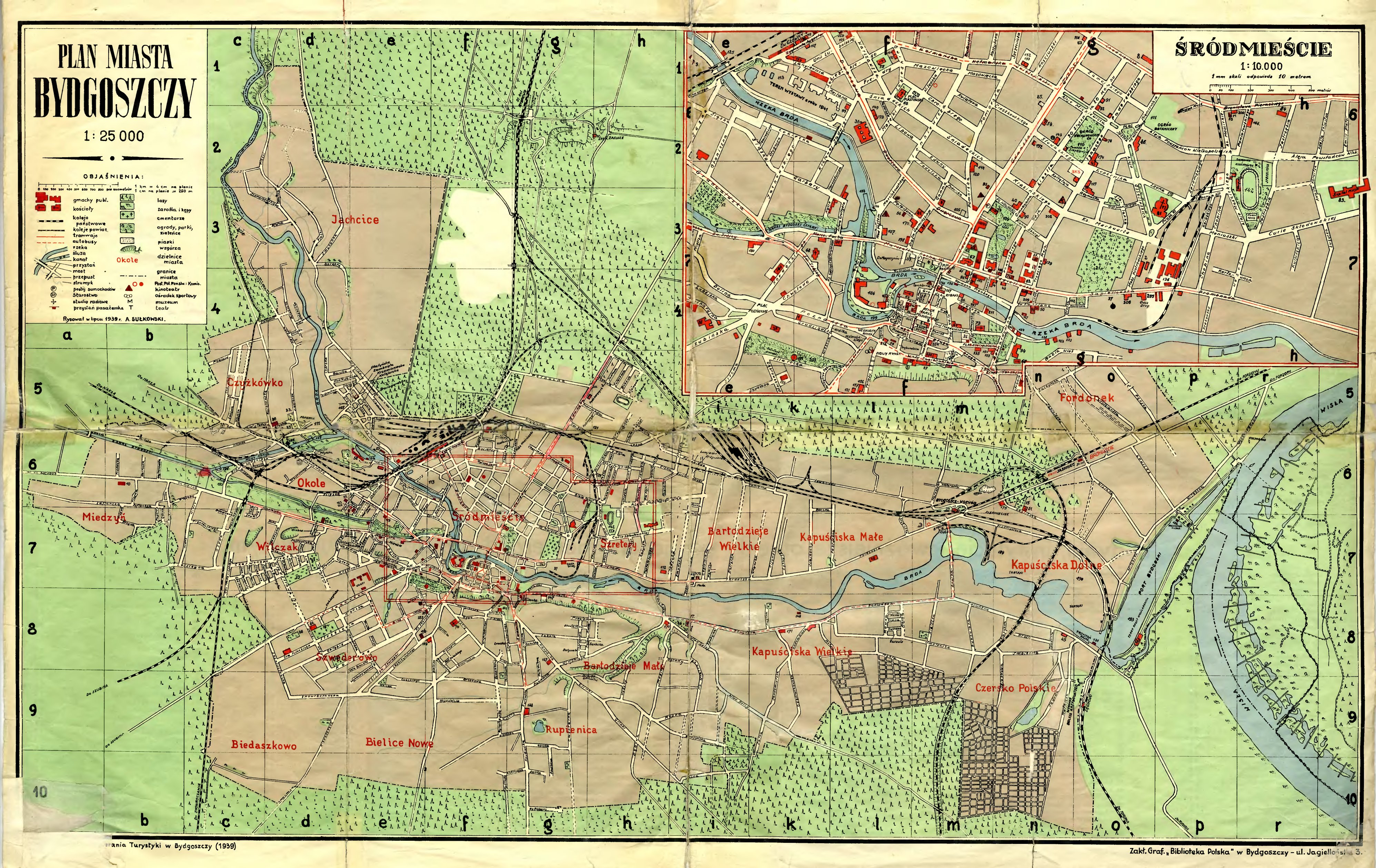
Map of Bydgoszcz from 1939 with the expanded Timber Port

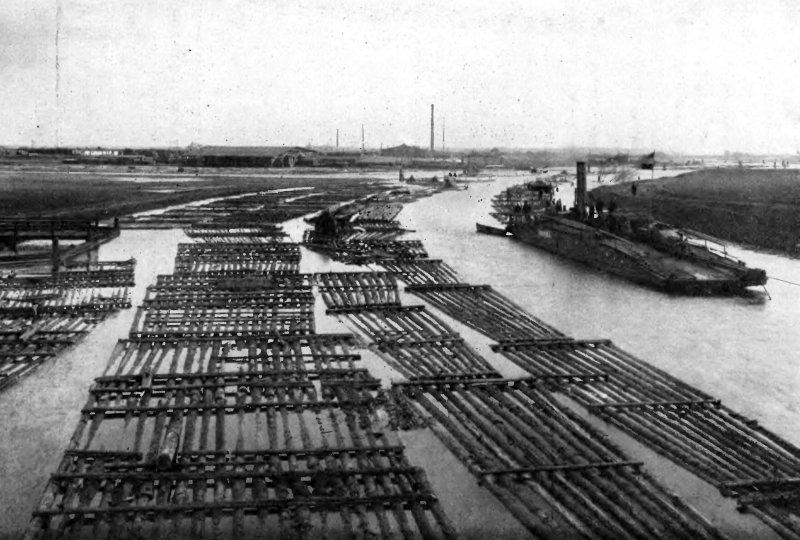
Timber rafting and towing conducted by the Bydgoszcz Towing Company – early 20th century

The Bydgoszcz Timber Port is a water basin on the Brda river in Bydgoszcz, Poland, used for storing timber during its rafting westward via the Vistula-Oder Waterway and for processing in local timber industry facilities. Constructed in 1879 and expanded in 1906, the port's significance declined after 1920 due to reduced timber transport to Germany. Subsequently, the basin at Brdyujście was repurposed as the Bydgoszcz Regatta Course, while the term "Timber Port" remains in historical contexts.

== History from 1879 to 1920 ==
The establishment of the Bydgoszcz Timber Port was driven by the increasing timber rafting through the Bydgoszcz Canal to Germany from the mid-19th century. Between 1818 and 1822, an average of 800 timber rafts passed through the Holy Trinity Lock II annually, but between 1868 and 1872, this number surged to 30,600, a 38-fold increase.

=== Average annual timber rafting through the Bydgoszcz Canal, 1873–1912 ===
No.	Years	Number of rafts [thousands]	Timber weight [thousand tonnes]
1.	1873–1877	39.7	403
2.	1878–1882	38.9	395
3.	1883–1887	37.6	383
4.	1888–1892	45.7	465
5.	1893–1897	36.9	376
6.	1898–1902	36.0	367
7.	1903–1907	43.2	441
8.	1908–1912	23.7	240

By the late 19th and early 20th centuries, the timber industry was a cornerstone of Bydgoszcz's economy. This was fueled by the city's strategic geographic and transport position, as well as growing trade relations between the German Empire and Russia. Timber was sourced from surrounding forests and rafted down the Brda from the Tuchola Forest. The Vistula river served as the primary route, transporting timber, mainly pine logs suitable for construction, from the Congress Poland, Galicia, Belarus, Lithuania, and Ukraine, facilitated by German merchants. Nearly all timber transport relied on waterways, as rail transport was uneconomical.

Brdyujście emerged as the primary timber port in eastern Germany, handling 61% of the timber rafted on the Vistula. The remaining 39% was distributed to riverside sawmills in places like Solec Kujawski and Fordon.

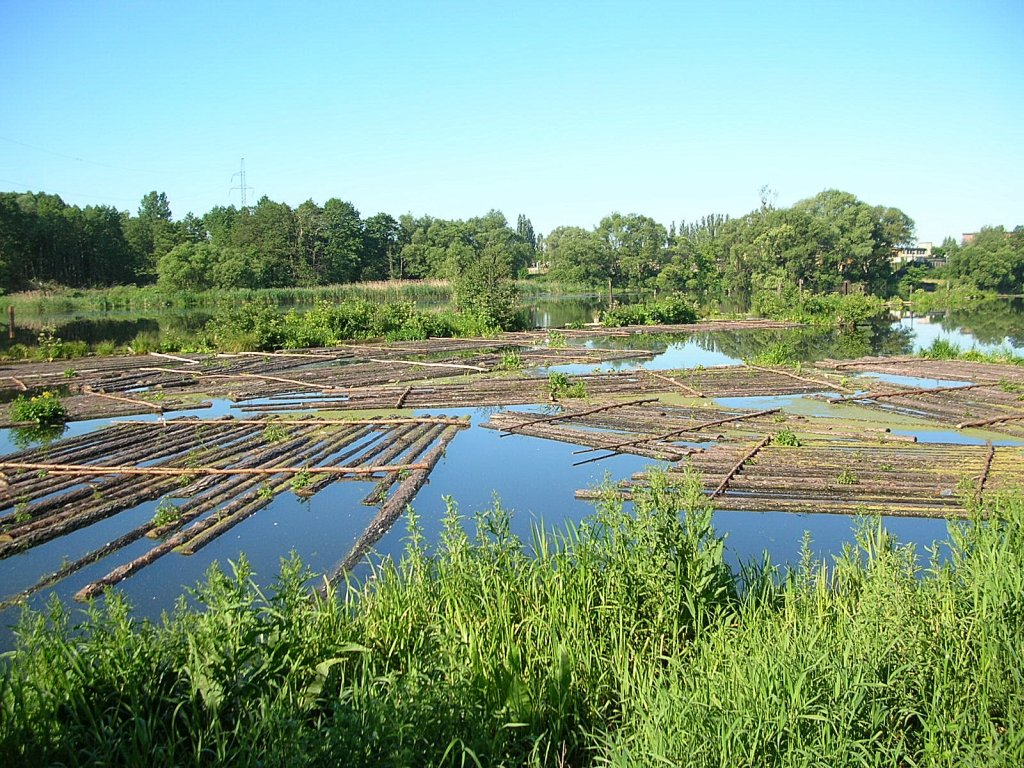
Timber rafts on the Brda in 2005

The increasing shipping traffic and the need to store large timber quantities awaiting rafting through the Bydgoszcz Canal necessitated a dedicated basin to stabilize the Brda's water levels. In 1875, the Bromberger Hafen-Aktiengesellschaft was established, comprising timber merchants, sawmill owners, and raft operators. Timber from Galicia and Congress Poland arrived at Brdyujście in autumn. Many rafts remained on the Vistula between Bydgoszcz and Toruń over winter, where ice and high water often broke them apart, carrying them to Gdańsk and causing losses. To mitigate this, a timber port was proposed at the Brda-Vistula confluence, designed and overseen by Garbe, head of the Bydgoszcz Waterways Inspection. Construction took place from 1876 to 1879, between Brdyujście and the Bydgoszcz City Lock. Two locks, two weirs, and a 50-hectare basin, known as the Timber Port or Bydgoszcz Port, were built.

The port comprised an outer and inner section. The outer port (foreport), a 9-hectare area between the Vistula and the Brdyujście Lock, served as a shelter for ships and rafts arriving from the Vistula and a staging area for lock passage. The inner port, above the Brdyujście Lock, was designed for raft storage to protect against Vistula floods and functioned as a timber market. It spanned 50 hectares, with a length of 1.65 km, width of 330 m, and depth of 2 m. Wooden piles driven into the riverbed divided the basin into three water lanes for securing rafts. A 3 km embankment along the Vistula protected both port sections.

Upon operation, timber losses plummeted, and revenues from the port and locks recouped construction costs within 20 years. On 1 January 1899, the Bromberger Hafen-Aktiengesellschaft transferred the port to state ownership.

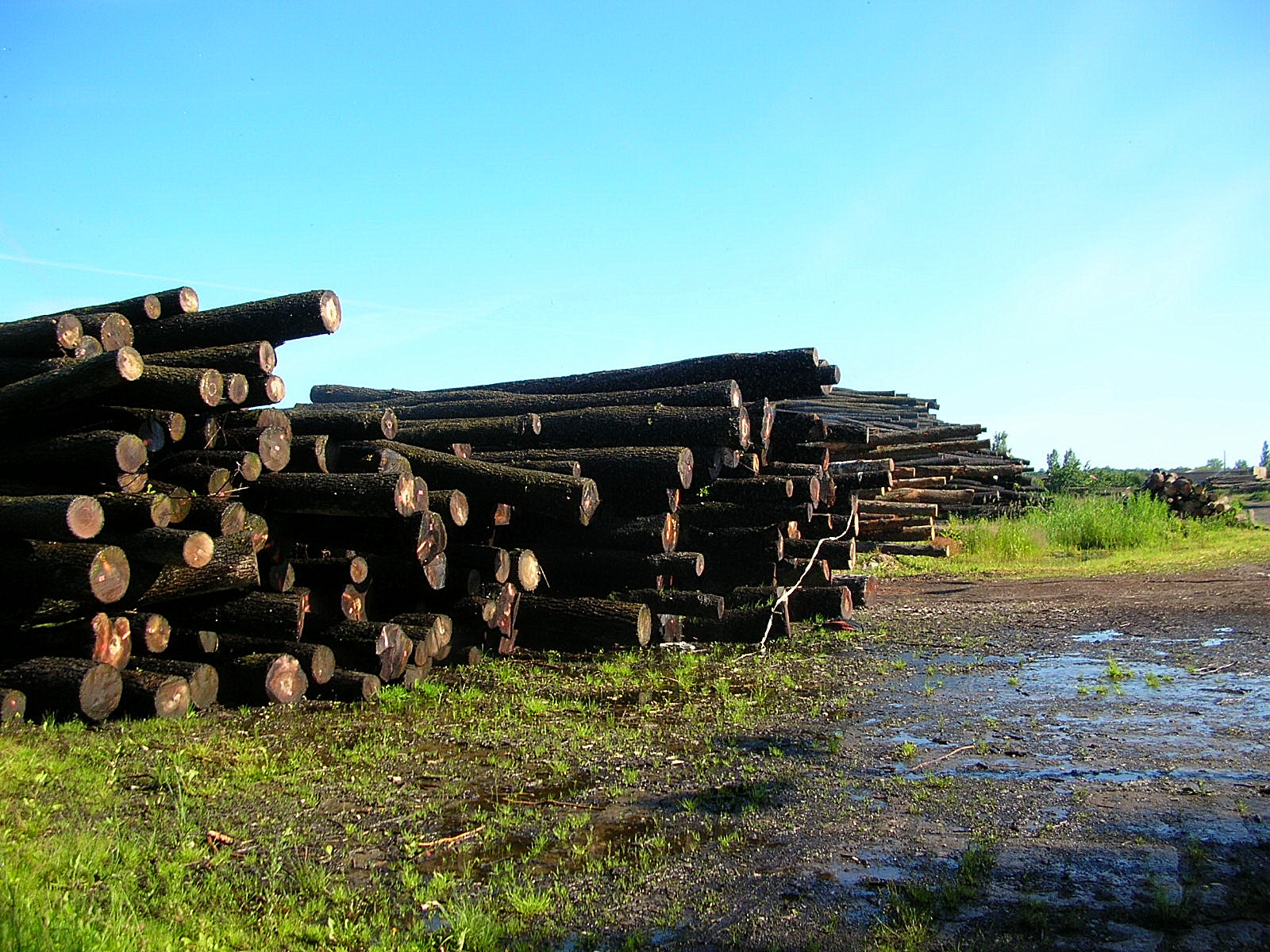
Timber stored on the Brda riverbanks

The Bydgoszcz port became Germany's largest inland timber port, with a 1 million m³ capacity, ensuring ample raw material for local sawmills. Annual timber rafting through the Brdyujście Lock averaged 2–3 million m³ from 1879 to 1916, peaking at 4.5 million m³ in 1905 and 4.8 million m³ in 1906, representing one-third of Germany's annual timber imports.

== Impact on Bydgoszcz's timber industry ==
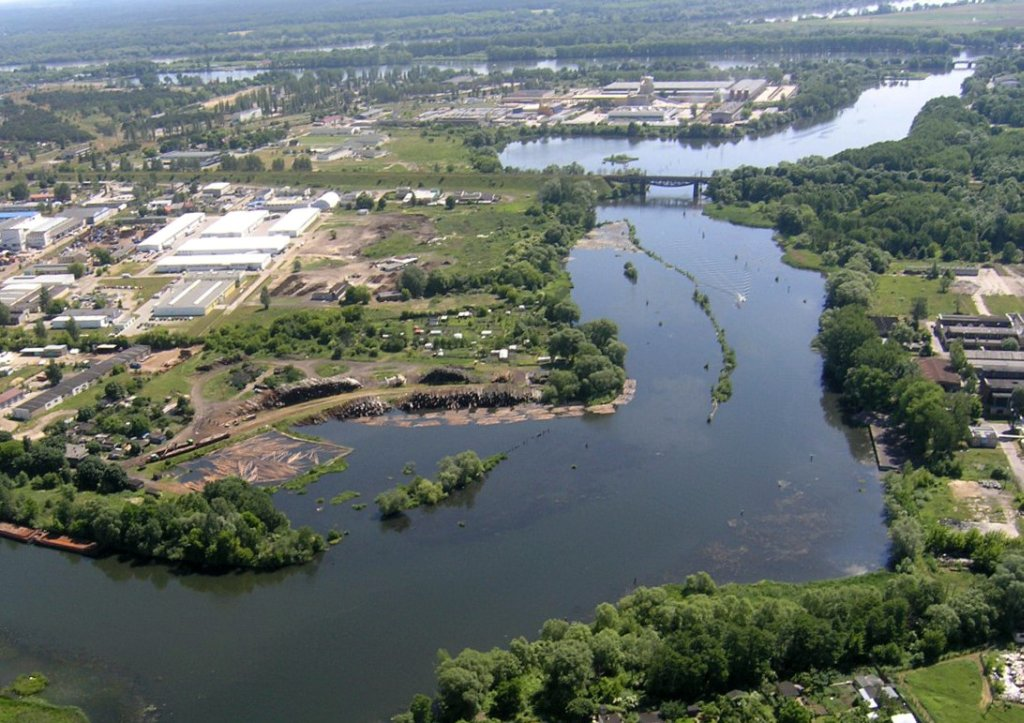
Timber Port at the Brda's mouth (2005)

The timber industry boomed after 1890, with 10 to 25 active sawmills between 1890 and 1907, including about 12 large ones owned by Berlin-based timber merchants.

=== Major sawmills in Bydgoszcz, 1875–1910 ===
No.	Sawmill	Owner	Established	Location	Employees (1907)	Timber processed [thousand m³]
1.	Sawmill at Rother's Mills		15th century	Mill Island		
2.	Mariański	Oskar Peter	1874	Kapuściska	50	30
3.	Carlsmühle	Carl Bumke	1875	Kapuściska	70	40
4.	Victoriamühle	Pulvermacher & Dyck	1874	Downtown	70	
5.	Wilhelmsmühle	Schramm	1874	Siernieczek	100	
6.	C.A. Franke Sawmill	Hermann Franke	1881	Old Town	65	
7.	S. Seliga Sawmill	Salomon Selig	1891	Kapuściska	250	85
8.	Lloyd Sawmill	Bydgoszcz Towing Company	1892	Czersko Polskie	70	30
9.	Lloyd Sawmill	Bydgoszcz Towing Company	1899	Siernieczek	120	55
10.	Johannismühle	Carl Rose	1907	Kapuściska		10
11.	D. Francke Sawmill	David Francke Söhne	1900	Siernieczek	150	50
12.	S.D. Jaffe Sawmill	S.D. Jaffe	1900	Bartodzieje	300	60

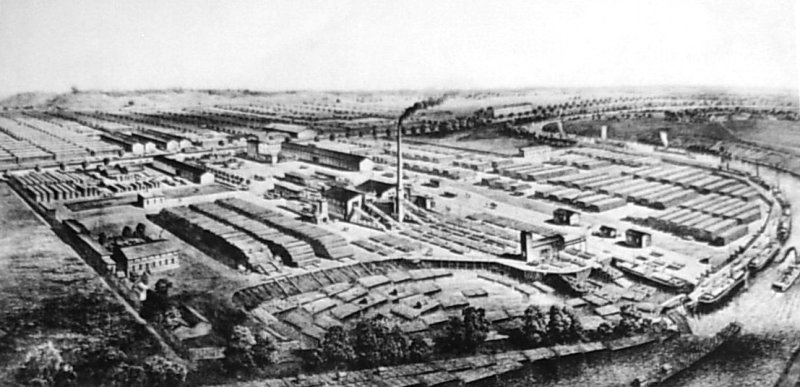
Salomon Selig's sawmill at 15 Toruńska Street – early 20th century

In 1907, Bydgoszcz sawmills processed 500,000 m³ of timber, employing about 1,600 workers. Supporting the timber industry, enterprises producing woodworking machinery (e.g., frame saws, saws, steam boilers) emerged, some still operating today (e.g., Fabryka Obrabiarek do Drewna, BELMA).

== History after 1920 ==
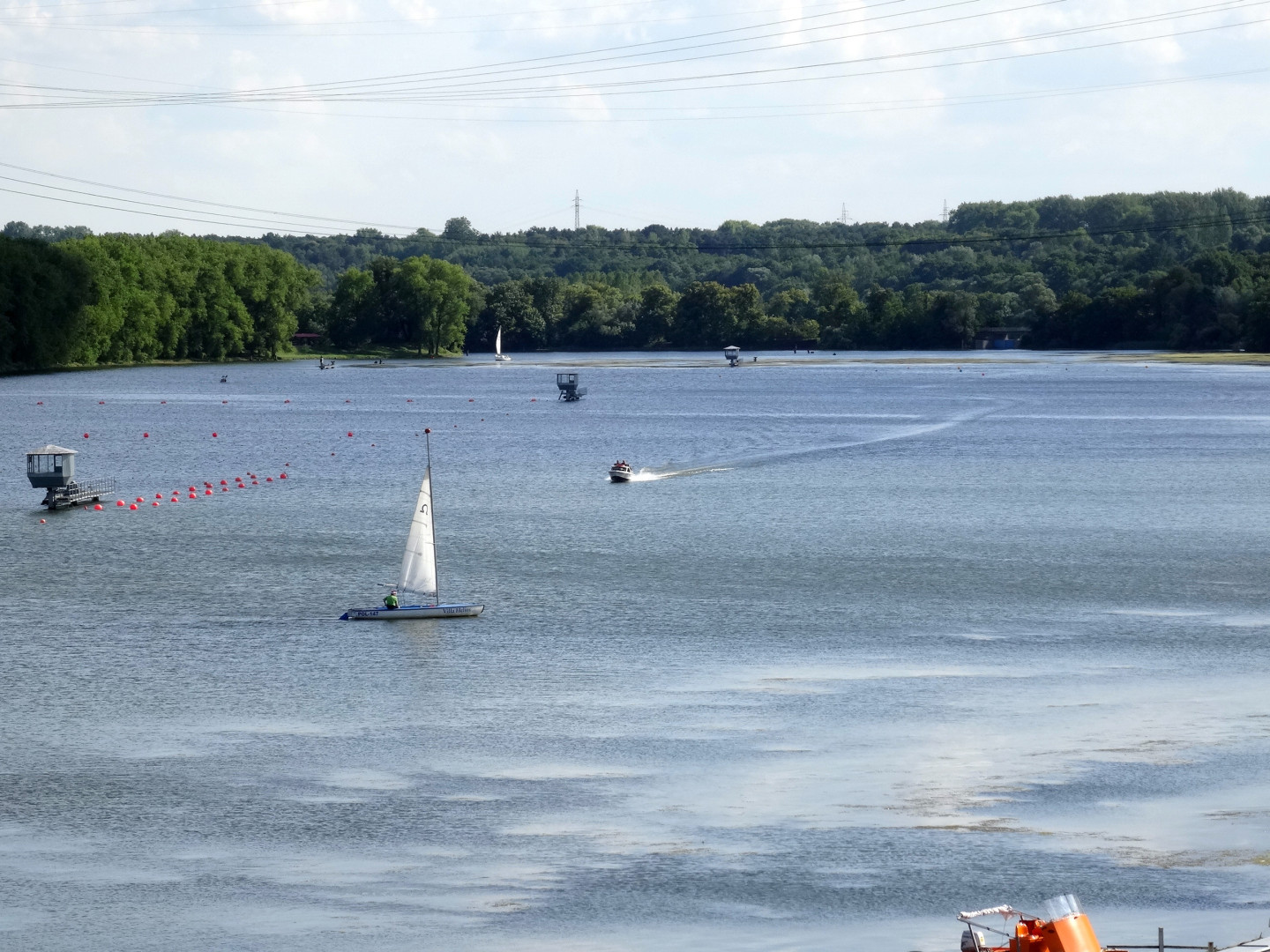
Inner port, now the Bydgoszcz Regatta Course

Poland's regained independence and new political borders disrupted the Vistula-Oder Waterway, reducing westward timber rafting. The Polish-German customs war further curtailed timber trade, shifting focus to processed goods, primarily furniture.

The Timber Port, especially its inner section, saw reduced use for timber storage, enabling its conversion into a regatta course for rowing and canoeing. During the interwar period, it hosted annual All-Polish Rowing Regattas and the 1929 European Rowing Championships.

In 1925, Bydgoszcz established Poland's only Timber Exchange, leveraging the port's 95-hectare capacity to store 300,000 m³ of timber. Several large sawmills operated, and new ones opened. However, post-1924 export declines and market stagnation reduced production, closing some sawmills. By the late 1930s, only small and a few medium-sized sawmills, plus one large State Forests sawmill expanded after 1935 with 500 employees, remained. Timber industry employment dropped from 1,500 in 1923 to 1,600 in 1930, and 800 in 1932. Key enterprises included the Plywood Factory (now Bydgoszcz Plywood Factory), exporting to countries like England and France, and O. and K. Pfefferkorn's Furniture Factory (now Bydgoszcz Furniture Factory).

== See also ==
- Żegluga Bydgoska

== Bibliography ==
- Biskup, Marian (1999). Historia Bydgoszczy. Tom II 1920-1939 [History of Bydgoszcz. Volume II 1920–1939] (in Polish). Bydgoszcz: Bydgoskie Towarzystwo Naukowe. ISBN 83-901329-0-7.
