= Fabryka Obrabiarek do Drewna =

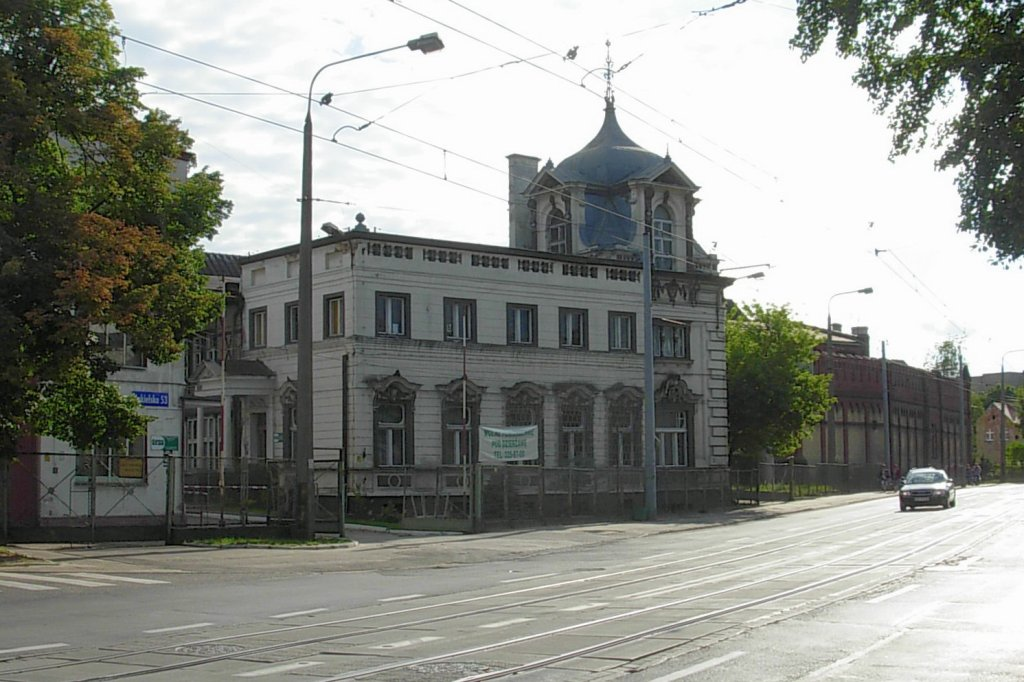
- View from Nakielska Street
- Company type: Private
- Founded: 1865
- Founder: Carl Blumwe
- Headquarters: Trzeciewiec; Dobrcz, Poland
- Website: fod.com.pl

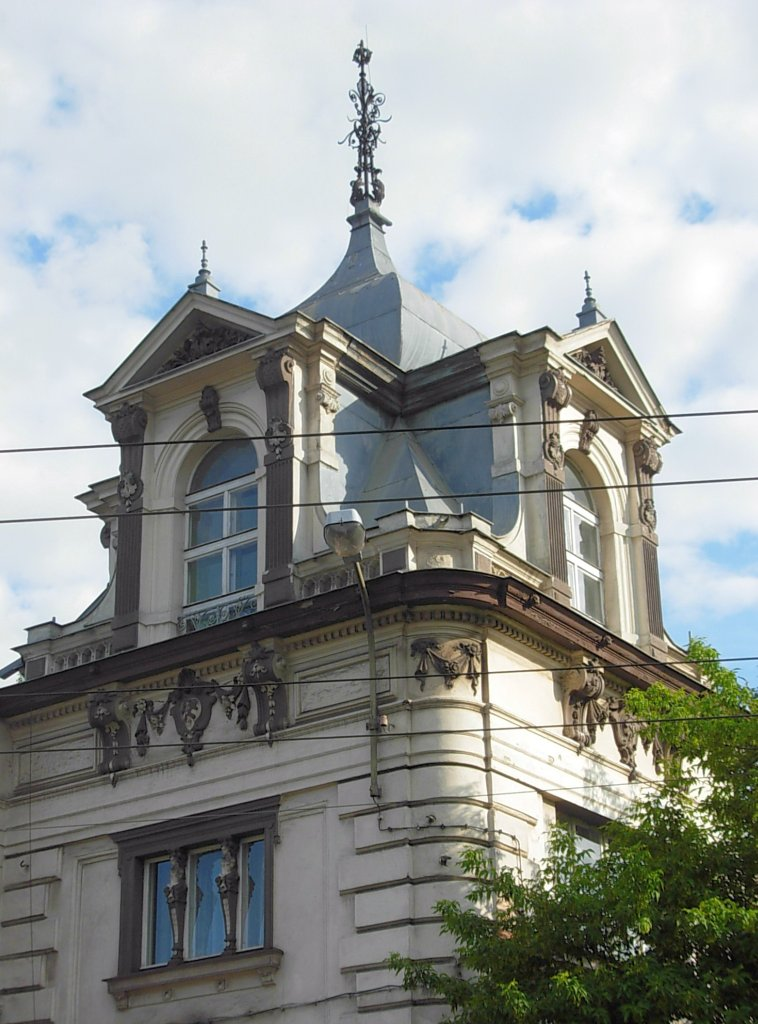
Administrative building, formerly the palace of the owners C. and W. Blumwe

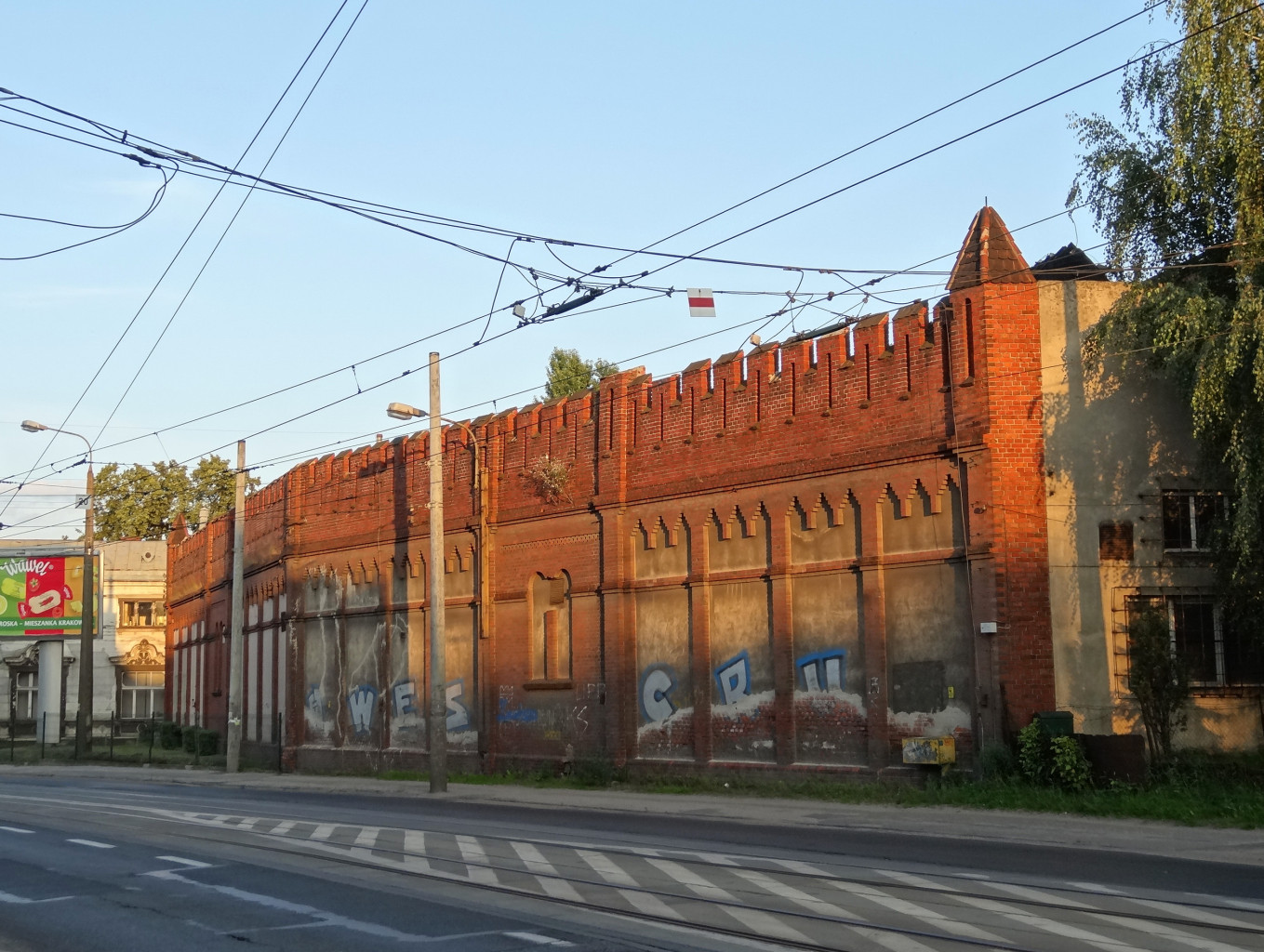
Historic assembly hall

Fabryka Obrabiarek do Drewna is one of the oldest operating enterprises in Bydgoszcz, producing machines and equipment for woodworking and wood processing since 1865, and currently also complete technological lines for the wood industry. It is the oldest company in its industry in Poland.

== Characteristics ==
The company specializes in the production of machines, equipment, and complete technological lines for the wood industry. Its offerings include sawmills, edgers, multi-rip saws, table saws, parquet machines, planers, milling machines, and technological lines for sawmills. In addition to manufacturing, the company provides ongoing service and has a technical facility dedicated to the continuous development and modernization of its products. Its goods are sold both domestically and for export.

=== Awards and distinctions ===
In recent years, the company has received the following awards and distinctions:

- Laureate of the 500 Most Innovative Companies ranking – 2005
- Nomination in the Brand Leaders 2005 ranking
- Laureate of the Forbes Diamonds ranking – 2010
- Winner of the Gold Medal at the DREMA 2016 International Trade Fair for Machines and Tools for the Wood and Furniture Industries in Poznań
- Symbol of Quality and Reliability – 2017
- "Fair Play Enterprise" Certificate – 2017
- "Fair Play Enterprise" Certificate and Nomination for the "Fair Play Enterprise" Statuette – 2018
- Gold Certificate "Fair Play Enterprise" – 2019

== History ==
=== Prussian period ===
The company was founded by Carl Blumwe, born in 1827 in Chojnice, who arrived in Bydgoszcz from Erfurt in 1855. Initially, he worked as a master craftsman at the Eastern Railway Repair Workshops established in Bydgoszcz, where he remained until 1865. He then set up his own workshop for building and repairing agricultural machinery under the name "Carl Blumwe" at 9 Jagiellońska Street, employing just three workers. In 1869, this workshop was expanded and moved to new premises at 94 Jagiellońska Street.

Seeking a better location for his business, Blumwe purchased a property with buildings from the widow of Julius Schmidt, the owner of an iron foundry, in Wilczak (now 53 Nakielska Street) in 1878. With factory facilities suited for his intended production, he expanded the site and installed new machinery, manufacturing sawmills and woodworking machines. In the same year, he brought his son Wilhelm into the company, renaming it "Carl Blumwe & Son" (German: C. Blumwe & Sohn Eisengiesserei u. Special – Fabrik für Patentwagenachsen und Holzbearbeitungsmaschinen). By 1886, the plant employed over 100 workers and had expanded its production to include steam engines with up to 300 hp and transmission devices.

The factory's growth was driven by a favorable economic climate for the woodworking industry in Bydgoszcz, bolstered by timber exports from the Congress Poland via the Vistula river and the Bydgoszcz Canal to the German Empire. The construction of the Bydgoszcz Timber Port in 1879 and its expansion between 1905 and 1907 significantly contributed to the local woodworking industry's rapid development after 1890. At its peak, the industry employed 6,200 workers and supported the growth of businesses producing woodworking machines and equipment.

Carl Blumwe died in 1887, and the factory was taken over by his son. That same year, Wilhelm Blumwe expanded the plant by acquiring additional plots on Nakielska Street, where he built workshops and factory halls equipped with electric lighting and modern transmission devices. By 1894, nearly 300 workers were employed, and by around 1900, the workforce had grown to 350. The factory specialized in patented wagon axles and woodworking machines, which were sold in both the German Empire and the Russian Empire.

In 1896, Wilhelm Blumwe built a modern iron foundry and converted the factory into a joint-stock company, becoming its director in 1897. The company established representatives in Berlin, Magdeburg, and Cologne and exported products to Brazil, China, France, Greece, the Netherlands, Japan, the Americas, Turkey, Italy, and Africa. Wilhelm managed the expanded factory until his death in 1903. Afterward, the factory was run by former manager Gustav Zschalig and businessman Bernhard Naumann. By 1912, the supervisory board included notable figures such as Lewin Louis Aronsohn, Martin Friedländer, and Julius Strelow from Bydgoszcz, along with Richard Dyhrenfurth from Berlin.

=== Interwar period ===
After Poland regained independence, the factory was incorporated into the Polish economy as part of the process of transitioning German enterprises to Polish ownership. It became a branch of the Pomorska Fabryka Maszyn S.A. in Grudziądz, later renamed Unia Joint-Stock Company, United Machine Factories in 1922. On 1 July 1928, the Bydgoszcz branch gained independence under the name Saw Mill and Woodworking Machinery Factory, formerly C. Blumwe & Son, Joint-Stock Company in Bydgoszcz.

The factory fully met domestic demand and exported its products to numerous countries, including Bulgaria, Turkey, Romania, Brazil, Peru, and Argentina. By the late 1920s, it employed 500 workers who produced approximately 150 sawmills and 1,000 woodworking machines annually. The factory's products received medals at international exhibitions in Rome (1926) and Vilnius (1928).

Around 1930, the factory faced significant challenges due to the collapse of the market and the decline of Bydgoszcz as a center for the wood industry and trade. This downturn resulted from the Great Depression, the German–Polish customs war, and monopolistic policies implemented by the State Forests administration. By 1931, the workforce had decreased to 100 employees, and by 1932 it had dropped further to 50.

The factory saw a resurgence between 1935 and 1939. During this period, it underwent reorganization and adopted modern production methods. The company employed 120 skilled workers, 20 clerks, and a team of engineers. Its product range included over 300 types of machines, including sawmills and various woodworking tools for carpentry, furniture production, crate and barrel manufacturing, parquetry, and other woodcrafts. One highlight of this era was the introduction of the Gigantic sawmill in 1936, featuring a feed mechanism with a speed of 320 rpm and a capacity of 60 m³/h. This innovation had no competition globally. Additionally, the Bydgoszcz factory triumphed in a sawmill competition held in Berlin during this period.

=== Occupation period ===
After the outbreak of World War II and the occupation of Bydgoszcz by the Wehrmacht, the assets of the company were confiscated by the German Haupttreuhandstelle Ost. The company reverted to its German name, Fabrik für Holzverarbeitungsmaschinen Blumwe und Co. AG. The factory was militarized but continued to produce machinery and equipment for the wood industry.

=== Post-war period ===
In 1945, in the early days after the liberation of Bydgoszcz, the factory resumed operations. In April 1945, Soviet military authorities included the plant on a list of 30 economic entities in Bydgoszcz scheduled for the removal of equipment to the Soviet Union. The transfer was avoided after intervention by Polish authorities with the Soviet Economic Mission in Warsaw in May 1945.

At the beginning of 1948, the company employed 365 people, and by 1954, the workforce had grown to 542, including 82 women. In 1947, the first machines were exported to Yugoslavia, marking the factory as the first exporter in Bydgoszcz after the liberation.

Until 1948, as one of several medium and large companies in Bydgoszcz, the factory directly fell under the Ministry of Industry in Warsaw. Initially, the factory began producing for the military, but soon returned to its original focus, meeting the needs of the wood industry. The factory was placed under a centrally managed industrial union. From 1950 to 1955, the factory expanded in line with the Six-Year Plan, which prioritized the expansion of heavy industry and means of production. In the 1960s, machine utilization in the factory averaged between 60% and 70%, and workers complained about inadequate heating in the halls and harsh working conditions. The situation was further aggravated by a significant employee turnover of around 43% annually.

From 1970, following the decision of the industrial union, the factory specialized in producing technological lines for the sawmill industry, while the production of other types of machinery was shifted to newly established enterprises. In the 1970s, the factory began cooperation with West German companies and launched a technological line for wood length joining. Export levels reached 40% of the production, primarily targeted at socialist countries. Under export agreements, employees also assembled machines abroad. The company had its own recreation center in Więcbork. In 1978, the factory opened a branch in Sępólno Krajeńskie, taken over from the local industry, where a mechanical processing department was launched, providing services for the repair of passenger and delivery vehicles.

Since 17 March 2000, Fabryka Obrabiarek do Drewna has operated as a commercial law company. In November 2011, the Minister of State Treasury announced a public tender for the sale of 81,600 shares in the company, representing 85% of the company's equity.

In 2017, a decision was made to relocate production to a new plant in Niwy or to Bydgoszcz's industrial park, with the move expected to be completed by 2021. In May 2020, a preliminary agreement was signed for the sale of nearly 4 hectares of the former factory's land for 17.5 million PLN to the Polish Holding Real Estate Group, with plans to develop 710 residential units at this site, according to a design by the Warsaw-based AGK Architekci studio. The former factory's assembly hall was to be preserved for commercial and service purposes. In 2021, the company moved to a new factory in Trzeciewiec.

On 2 September 2017, a performance of Sny Marii Dunin by the Alelale theatre was held in the factory's hall.

== Historical factory buildings ==
The factory complex, established in the late 19th century, resembled industrial setups found in Łódź and Warsaw. Such complexes often included a palace or villa for the factory owner, complete with landscaped gardens, within the factory grounds. The richly decorated facades of the residential and administrative buildings highlighted the social status of the factory owner, contrasting sharply with the austere, brick architecture of the industrial halls.

The factory buildings were developed gradually and underwent frequent modifications, reconstructions, and expansions. By 1879, the owner's villa and an adjacent carpentry workshop were already in place. Between 1893 and 1922, new structures were added, including a stable, forge, boiler house (1895), three turning shops (1894, 1900), an assembly hall (1896–1897), a building housing a cupola and two casting furnaces (1920), and a foundry (1922, designed by Fritz Weidner). Some of the historic machinery, including lathes, has survived, along with the last building in Bydgoszcz clad in slate.

After 1945, particularly between 1950 and 1952, much of the original complex was demolished to make way for new production facilities. Other buildings were so heavily altered that they lost their original forms. As of today, only the following buildings from the historical complex remain:

- Office building (1850–1900)
- Assembly hall (1896–1897)
- Turning shop, now a warehouse with a gatehouse (1895–1900)

Until 2017, a wooden warehouse building was also present on the even-numbered side of Nakielska Street (no. 50).

=== Assembly hall ===
The assembly hall was constructed between 1896 and 1897, although its original design has not been preserved. In 1950, it was expanded eastward. Located in the northeastern part of the factory grounds, it sits west of the main entrance gate. Its northern wall doubles as part of the brick perimeter wall along Nakielska Street. The hall's Neo-Gothic style features an arcade frieze, pseudo-turrets, and battlements.

The building's form reflects the industrial architectural trends of the late 19th and early 20th centuries. Inside, a hydraulic press dating to around 1900, used for assembling sawmills, remains intact.

The hall was one of the largest preserved and operational industrial buildings in Bydgoszcz, notable for its architectural appeal and its continued use for its original production purposes.

=== Former turning shop ===
This building stands east of the main entrance gate and was constructed between 1895 and 1900. It was added to the northern wall of an earlier turning shop and became the third structure with this function along the eastern boundary of the lot, now Stawowa Street. After 1945, the building ceased to serve as a production hall. During renovations between 1971 and 1972, a gatehouse was added to its northwestern section, while the remaining area was repurposed as a finished goods warehouse.
