= Holy Trinity Lock II =

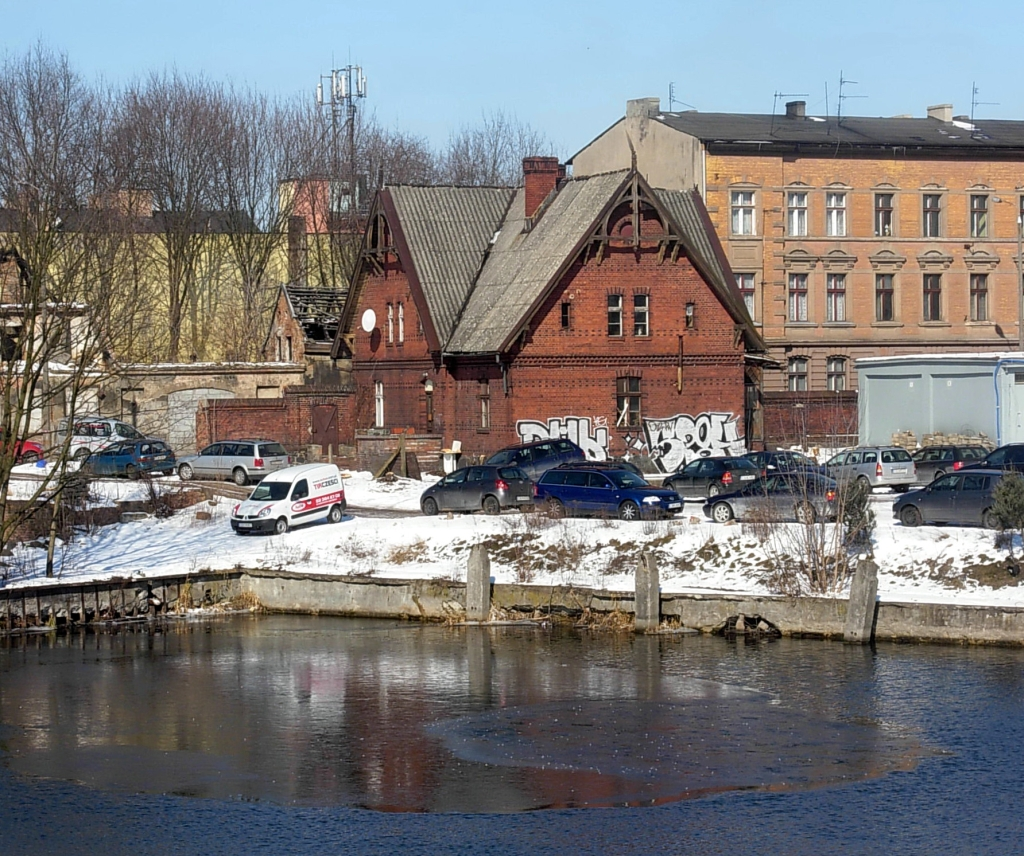
- Former lock keeper's house, dismantled 15–17 July 2013
- Interactive map of Holy Trinity Lock II
- Country: PL-KP
- Location: Bydgoszcz
- Coordinates: 53°7′33″N 17°59′35″E

Holy Trinity Lock II is a preserved lock on the Bydgoszcz Canal.

It was one of the hydrotechnical structures of the old section of the Bydgoszcz Canal, which was decommissioned in 1915. It is the former third lock of the Vistula-Oder Waterway. It existed between 1774 and 1972.

== Location ==
The lock was located in Bydgoszcz, on Grottgera Street, about 200 m west of the Municipal Lock.

== History ==
The lock was built in 1773–1774 as a wooden structure. It was rebuilt in brick between 1803 and 1810, when the first reconstruction of the Vistula-Oder waterway took place. It was used for barges with a load capacity of up to 200 tons until 1915, when a new section of the canal with newly built locks Okole Lock and Czyżkówko Lock was completed. Until the end of the 1940s, it was used in emergencies. It was finally decommissioned at the end of the 1960s.

Between 1970 and 1972, the lock was filled in along with a 500-meter section of the Bydgoszcz Canal due to the construction of the Grunwald road junction. At the end of 2010, during the construction of a tram line to the railway station, after the asphalt on the north side of Foch Street was torn up, a fragment of the brick wall of the northern head of the upper gate of the lock appeared.

A fragment of the reservoir leading from the Brda River towards the lock has survived to this day. The lock keeper's house that used to stand here was demolished on 15–17 July 2013. It was built of red facing brick, covered with tiles, and surrounded by a garden. It was hidden behind a high brick wall with a steel entrance gate from Grottgera Street. Its style was reminiscent of late 19th-century suburban villa architecture. It was decorated with brick motifs, and wooden details were placed at the junction of the roof slopes.

=== Bridge at the lock ===
From the end of the 18th century, there was a pedestrian bridge at the lower end of the lock. In 1836, a road bridge with a stone surface and sidewalks for pedestrians was built, supported by brick abutments. Between 1962 and 1964, the Płock Bridge Construction Company demolished the old structure and built a new reinforced concrete single-span bridge based on the old abutments. The bridge was demolished in 1980 in connection with the construction of northern and tram bridges along Ferdinand Foch Street.

== Characteristics ==
It was a brick chamber lock. It had wooden double-leaf support gates. The bolts used to regulate the flow of water and fill the chamber were manually operated. The lock had two technological footbridges at the lower and upper heads, which opened together with the gates. In addition, at the lower head there was a pedestrian bridge connecting Grottgera Street with Marshal Ferdinand Foch Street.

== Gallery ==
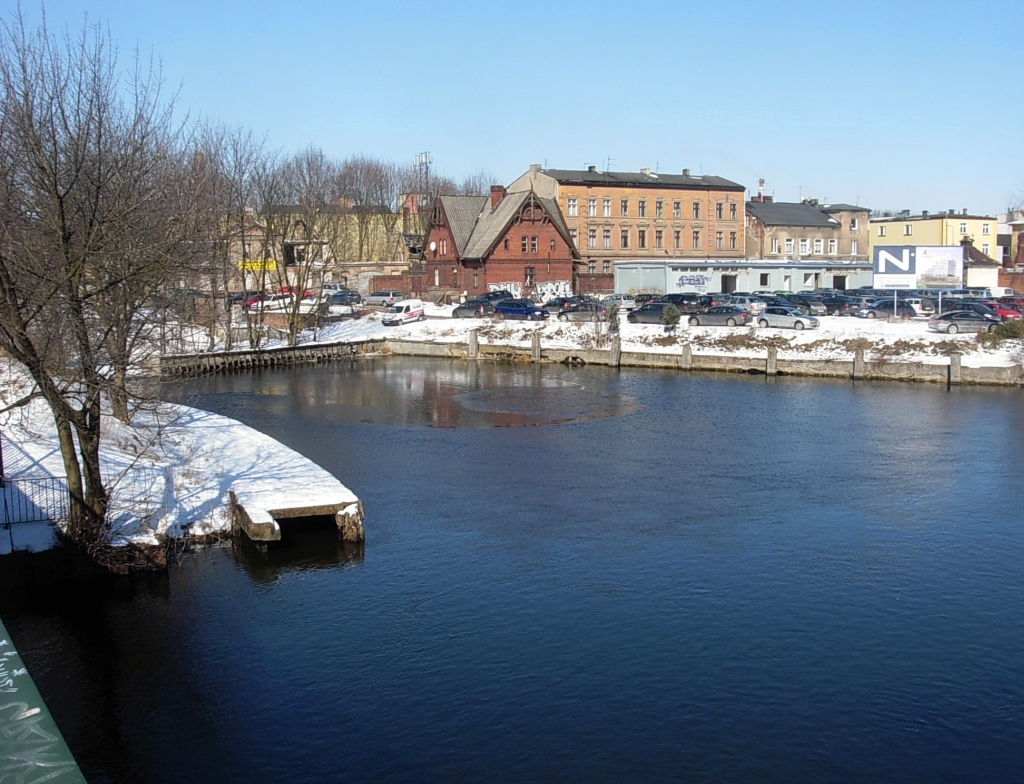
Water reservoir

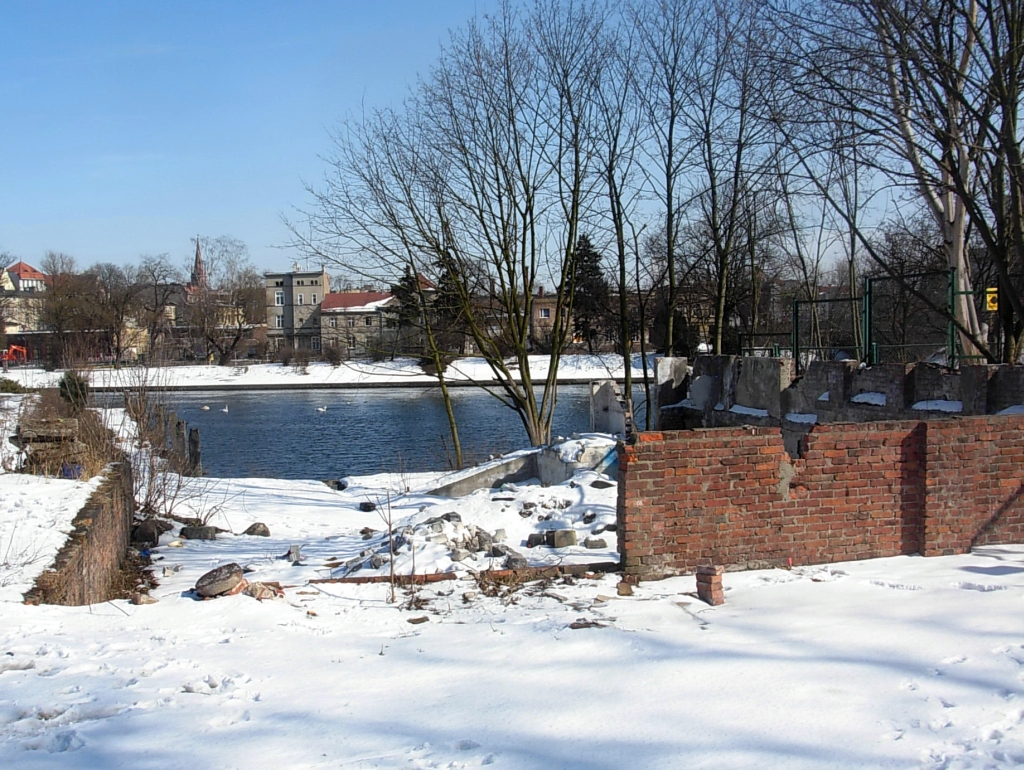
Remains of the lock

== See also ==
- Bydgoszcz Canal
- Vistula-Oder Waterway

== Bibliography ==
- Bartowski, Krzysztof (2005). On the 231st Anniversary of the Bydgoszcz Canal (1774–2005). In: Materials on the History of Culture and Art of Bydgoszcz and the Region, Issue 10. Bydgoszcz. (In Polish)
- Winid, Walenty (1928). The Bydgoszcz Canal. Warsaw: Publishing House of the Institute for the Promotion of Science. (In Polish)
- Woźniak-Hlebionek, Agnieszka (2002). The Bydgoszcz Canal, Brda, and Noteć in Prussian Investment Plans, 1773–1915. In: Kronika Bydgoska, vol. XXIII (2001). Bydgoszcz. (In Polish)
