= Bydgoszcz Regatta Course =

Water reservoir for boat races in Bydgoszcz, Poland

- Tor regatowy w Bydgoszczy Poland (Polish)
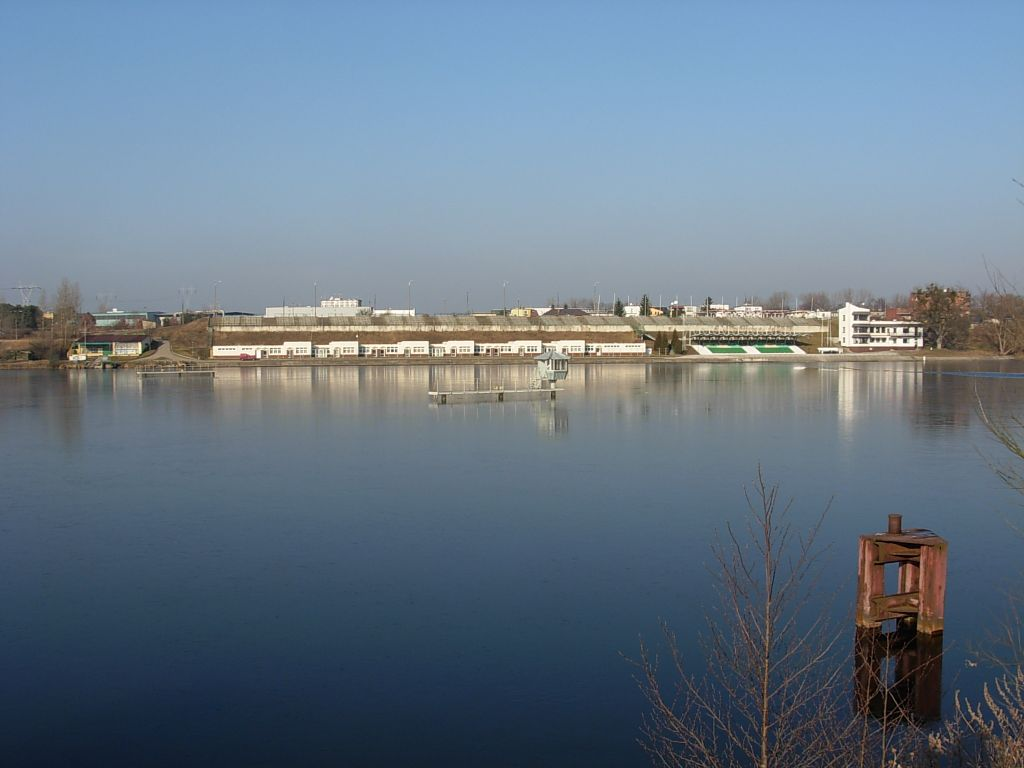
- View of the tribunes
- Interactive map of Bydgoszcz Regatta Course
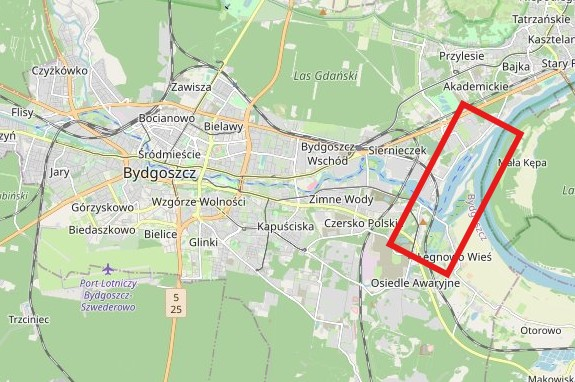
- Location on a Bydgoszcz map
- Location: Brdyujście district, Bydgoszcz Poland
- Coordinates: 53°06′59″N 18°07′14″E
- Type: Reservoir
- Part of: Brda river basin
- Primary inflows: Brda river
- Primary outflows: Vistula river
- Basin countries: Poland
- Built: late 1870s
- Max. length: 2,000 metres (1.2 mi)
- Max. width: 330 metres (0.21 mi)
- Surface area: 60 hectares (0.23 sq mi)
- Average depth: 3.7 metres (12 ft)
- Surface elevation: 33 metres (108 ft)

The Bydgoszcz Regatta Course is a water reservoir located in Bydgoszcz, in the lower section of the Brda River, used as a boat racing venue. It uses waters of the Brda River thanks to a roller dam controlling the flow into the estuary section of the river. The reservoir is separated from the Vistula River by an embankment and a causeway.

It is the oldest regatta area in Poland, created as a national center for water sports in the interwar period. It is nowadays one of the most important water bodies used for rowing and kayaking races in the country.

== Location ==
The Bydgoszcz regatta course is located in the eastern part of the city, at 26 Witebska Street, within the district of Brdyujście. It is currently an important sailing area of the Kuyavian–Pomeranian Voivodeship.

== History ==
Since 1774 and the construction of the Bydgoszcz Canal, the Brda river section of the city has been a critical piece of the Vistula-Oder waterway.

In the late 19th century, the necessity to store large amounts of timber waiting to be floated down the Bydgoszcz canal towards the German Empire called for the building of a body of water that would fit the purpose. Furthermore, this reservoir was deemed useful to stabilize the level of the Brda river, hence helping to ease the increasing shipping traffic.

=== Wood harbour (1879–1912) ===
The reservoir was put into service on 27 September 1879. It completed the hydrotechnical network structures which allowed a flow control of the Brda river. The ensemble comprising the Brdyujście water lock , two weirs and the Kapuściska lock (located downtown – non existent) dammed the river and filled a vast rectangular valley, 1.65 kilometres (1.03 mi) long and 330 metres (1,080 ft) wide. The reservoir was separated from the Vistula river by a 3 kilometres (1.9 mi)-long embankment and formed the so-called Wood harbour (Port Drzewny) or inner port. The water body was used between March and November, either to store timber allocated for local sawmills or to direct timber for westbound transport via the Bydgoszcz Canal. In winter (from December to February), the reservoir also harboured ships and barges without activity.

In 1906, the structures were renovated: the Kapuściska lock and one weir were removed, while the second weir was upgraded to a roller dam, better fitted to control the increased water flow level. As a result, the wood harbour expanded and the Brda river spread out wider; as such, the water area for storing wood on the river extended all the way from today's Sporna Street.

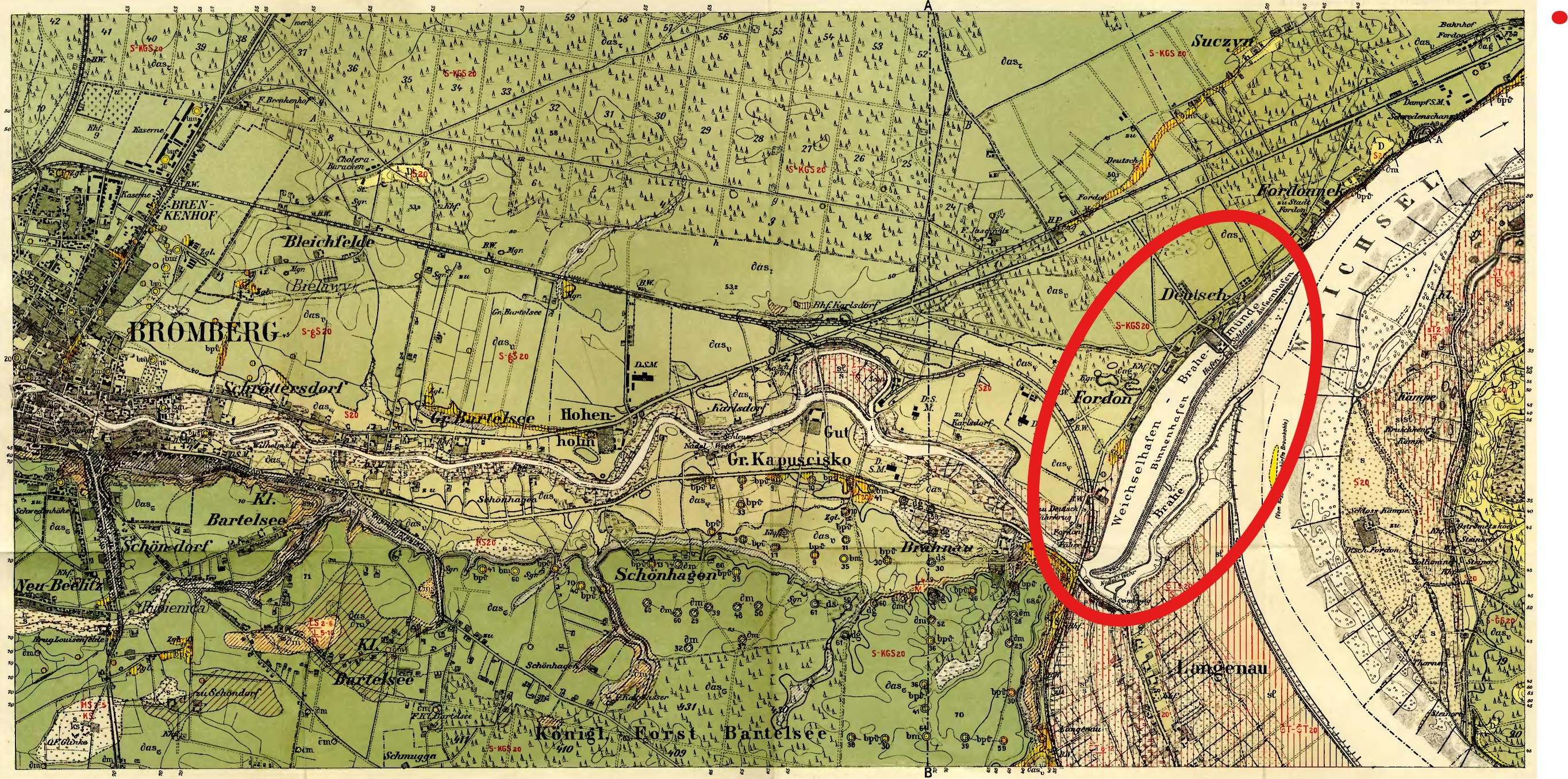
Map of the regatta area in 1902

At that period, the harbour was one of the most modern and largest in the German Empire. The local wood industry developed to an unprecedented scale: in 1906, around 4.8 million cubic metres (6,300,000 cu yd) of timber was floated through the Brdyujście lock, i.e. 33% of German annual timber supply.

=== First races (1912–1920) ===
At the beginning of the 20th century, the water area attracted the attention of the rowing clubs, developing in Bydgoszcz (then called Bromberg).

Three water lanes were set up by driving into the bottom wooden posts used to tie rafts: hence, two rowing teams could compete. Once extended, the venue allowed six teams to run at the same time and was considered one of the best rowing courses in Germany.

The first races were organized in 1912. Called the East German Regatta, they were held annually until 1916 and attracted numerous rowing associations from all over the German Empire.

=== Facility construction (1920–1924) ===
In 1920, when Bydgoszcz returned under Polish rule, the city's borders were extended and reached the Vistula river. As a consequence, the newly created Bydgoszcz Rowing Association (Bydgoskie Towarzystwo Wioślarskie, BTW) came up with the initiative to transform the Brdyujście regatta area into a national water sports center, setting up there a yearly All-Polish Rowing Regatta (Wszechpolskie Regaty Wioślarskie).

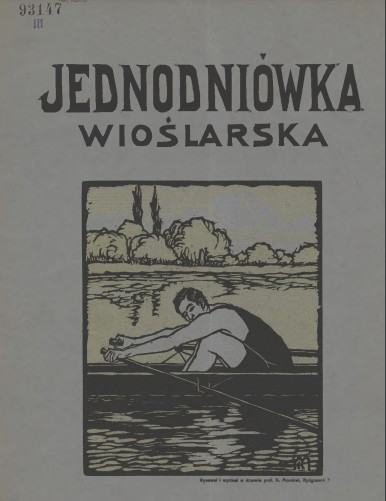
Cover of a brochure edited for the 5th All-Polish Rowing Regatta in 1924

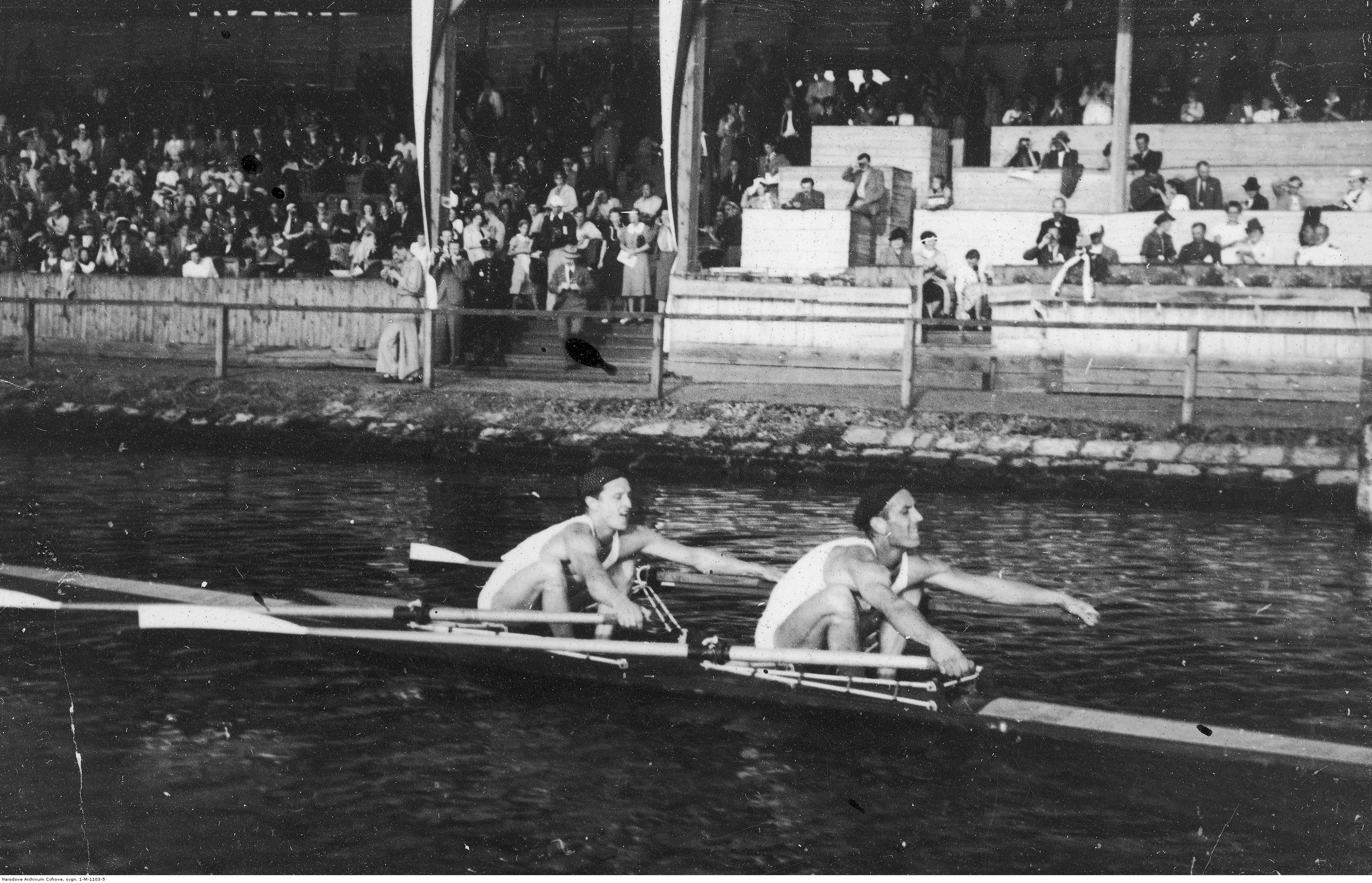
International Rowing Regatta, 1939

Such a shift of the reservoir role was made possible on account of the collapse of timber trade, impacted by the German–Polish customs war and the difficult management of the Vistula-Oder waterway between the two countries. Thereby, the wood harbour activity dwindled dramatically.

On 29 June 1920, the first rowing and kayaking competition for the Polish championship was organized in Brdyujście. In 1924, the BTW leased a restaurant with a garden in Brdyujście, including a rowing summer resort and a marina. On the embankment separating the regatta course from the Vistula river (in today's Łęgnowo district), wooden stands with a view on the finish line were erected, with a 2,500 audience capacity. On the opposite shore, hangars for storing boats and kayaks were built, as well as a finishing line tower. The stands, built in two months, were inaugurated on 3 August 1924, during the All-Polish Regatta attended by Stanisław Wojciechowski, then President of the Republic.

With such an equipment, the water facility became the largest and most modern facility of its type in Poland.

=== Peak period (1924–1945) ===
National regattas have been organized in Bydgoszcz every year until 1937. The water track was also used as a venue for international regattas (1927, 1928, 1936, 1937, 1938).

In 1927, the first Polish long-distance swimming championships were as well held on the water course.

In 1929, the European Rowing Championships were held there: the Polish team won, among others, the bronze medal in the coxless four. The squad consisted of Bydgoszcz athletes from the BTW, already bronze medalists a year prior at the Amsterdam Olympics games. Over the two days of competition, the audience reached 30,000 spectators, which remains till today a popular record of attendance for a boat racing competition in Poland.

On this occasion, the city council funded the expansion of the stands capacity. The reservoir was divided into waterways but its length limited to 1.8 kilometres (1.1 mi), which did not allow for 2,000 metres (1.2 mi) long races.

During World War II the track was devastated. In 1945, the stands were burned down by Soviet soldiers.

=== First reconstruction of the tracks (1945–1957) ===
From 1945 to 1952, the track hosted annual national regattas for the Polish Championship.

Later, this exclusive monopoly was challenged, on the one hand by the construction of the Lake Malta in Poznań, and on the other hand by the modernization of other race tracks facility in the country (Kalisz, Kruszwica and Szczecin).

The need of modernization of the Bydgoszcz venue was manifest, so as to be able to host national and international competitions. It was carried out in 1957–1958. The reconstruction project included:

- the extension of the tracks length to 2,000 metres (6,600 ft);
- deeper water tracks to 3 metres (9.8 ft);
- the construction of a starting jetty in Łęgnowo together with an embankment protecting the weir;
- the removal of the ancient wooden poles from the bottom of the reservoir;
- the erection of judges' rooms;
- the construction of a slope at the finish line, where new grandstands were set up.

=== Successive renovations (1957–2015) ===
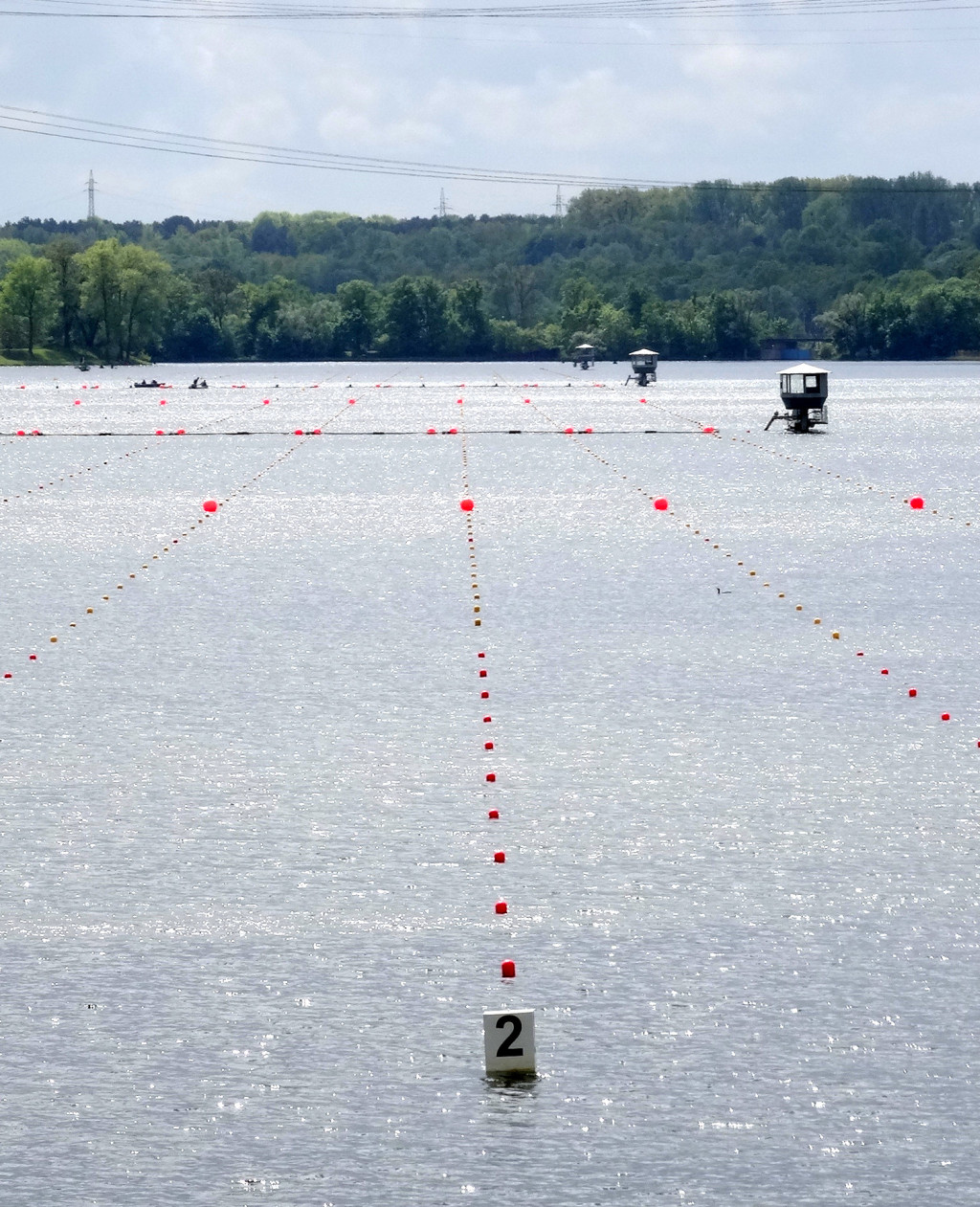
Water lanes, 2015

After the reconstruction, although the track now measured 2,040 metres (6,690 ft) by 390 metres (1,280 ft), it still did not meet the official required length for a European Championship regatta, i.e. 2,100 metres (6,900 ft), as described by the World Rowing. The missing 56.5 metres (185 ft) could not be added as it would have brought a risk of leak in the embankment at the finish line. As a consequence, the 1958 European Championship regatta was awarded to Poznań.

In the 1960s, a second stage of reconstruction occurred:

- renovation of the starting jetty (1966–1968);
- fencing of the entire village area (1969);
- building of access roads (1969–1971);
- construction of grandstands for 200 boats (1970).

From 1957 to 1968, the Bydgoszcz regatta hosted races for the Polish championship.

In 1977, during the National Youth Spartakiad organized in Bydgoszcz, a Committee for the Construction of the Brdyujście Regatta Course was established. It aimed at carrying out a third overhaul of the race track, encompassing, among others:

- re-orienting the axis of the course track, so as to extend it by 30 metres (98 ft);
- building grandstands for 4000 spectators and changing rooms for 400 athletes;
- erecting referee towers for intermediate timings (500, 1000 and 1500 m);
- construction of a starting platform and new boat grandstands.

In the 1970s, dredging works were also carried out to clear accumulating silt and the overgrowth of aquatic plants.

In 1983, the venue was selected to host the European Junior Canoeing Championships. For the occasion, a fourth stage of track expansion and modernization was performed: it covered a partial roofing of the grandstands, the construction of stairs, terraces and balustrades and the erection of new masts and starters' booths.

A fifth stage of reconstruction took place in 1996–1997, with a new administration building incorporating a three-story referee tower.

Since 2000, further modernizations have been carried out:

- starting machines set up at 500 m and 1000 m (June 2004);
- renovation of the grandstands and the athletes rooms (2007);
- change of the steel rope markings (2008)
- sediment cleaning (2008).

In 2004, the water race venue moved under the ownership of the Astoria Bydgoszcz sport club. In 2007, it moved into the hands of the UKS Kopernik association from the Youth Palace in Bydgoszcz (Pałac Młodzieży w Bydgoszczy). Since 2012, the facility has been managed by a municipal department, the Immobile Łuczniczka sports and entertainment unit.

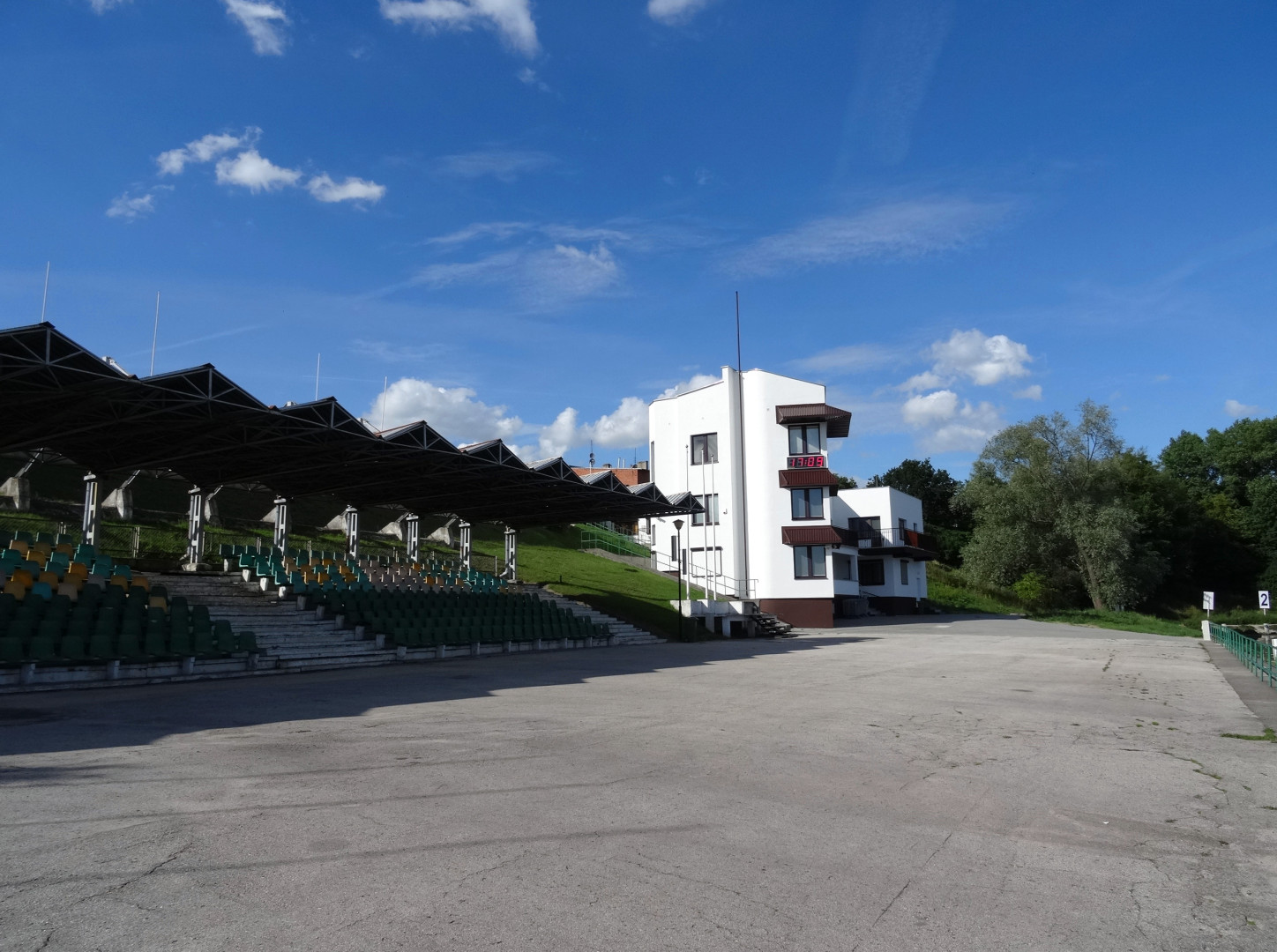
Grandstands and referees' tower, 2015

=== Current period (post 2015) ===
Between 2015 and 2018, additional refurbishing works were performed:

- the finish line area was widened;
- the starting system changed;
- a new referee's tower rebuilt;
- a new boat hangar and a covered grandstand for over 300 seats were built (cost of PLN 4 million).

The City Office announced a tender for the design of a culvert connecting the track with the waters of the Vistula river, which will fight the shallowing of the track and create better conditions for holding competitions. It is assumed that a small hydroelectric power plant will be built at the culvert.

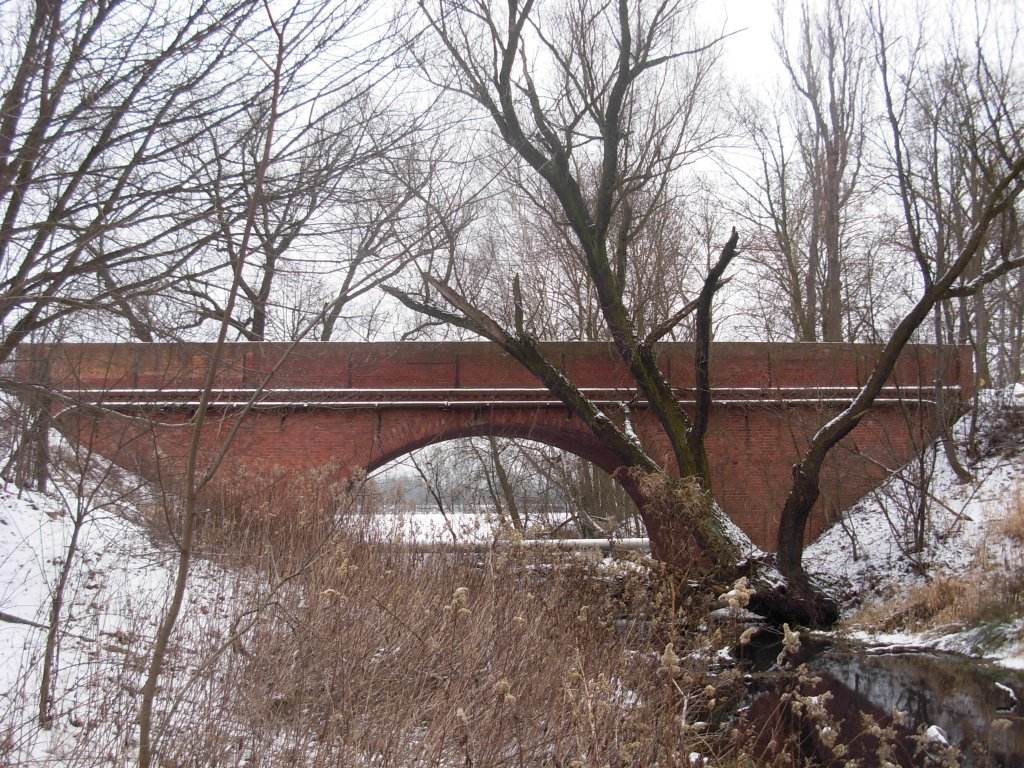
Bridge on Witebska street

== Characteristics ==
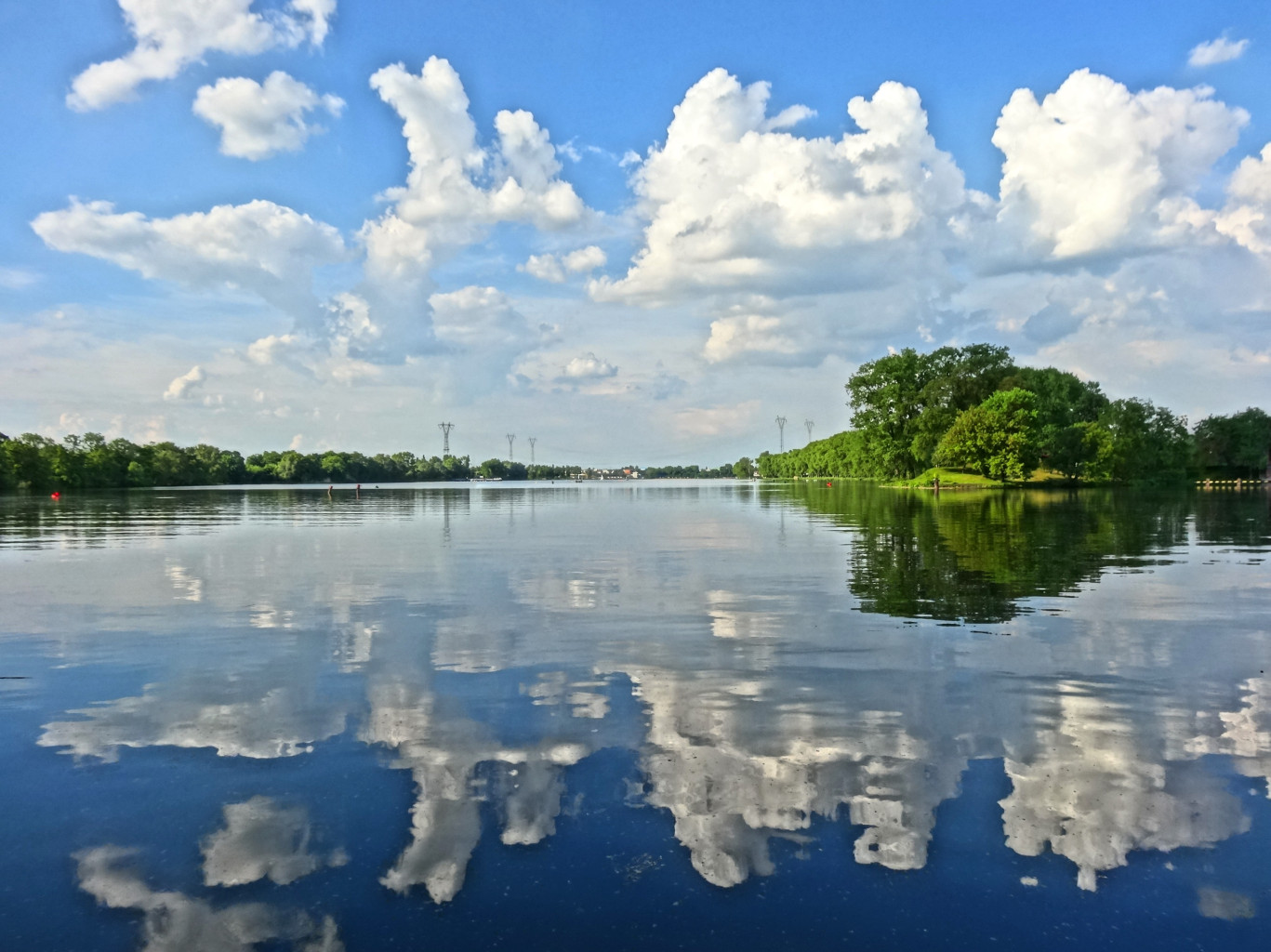
View of the regatta area, 2014

The Bydgoszcz regatta course is a body of water which shape is close to a rectangle, with a main axis running approximately along a north–south direction.

To the east, the reservoir is flanked by an island which tips open onto the Brda river (south) and the Vistula river (north). A dedicated canal leads to the Czersko Polskie lock, the first gate of the Vistula-Oder Waterway.

To the south, a dam closes the reservoir and allows both the passing of the railway line towards Bydgoszcz Łęgnowo station and the Toruńska Street.

To the north stand the finish line and the historic Brdyujście lock, operating from 1879 to 2002, restored in 2014.

To the west, several facilities are located: the grandstands, the judges' tower, hangars, parking lots and the marinas of the sailing clubs. Ships can winter on these grounds. This shore also displays on the Witebska street a narrow arched, brick bridge (built in 1890) over a 380 metres (0.24 mi) long ravine. The latter was an ancient gravel excavation site which, once filled by water in the 1890s, had been used to store wooden rafts till 1990.

The regatta course covers an area of 60 hectares (0.23 sq mi), with a rectangle shape, a bit more than 2 kilometres (1.2 mi) long by 330 metres (1,080 ft) wide. The site offers:

- 9 lanes for kayak competitions on various distances (200m, 500m, 1000m, 2000m, 3000m and 5000 m);
- 6 lanes for rowing races, 2000 m long.

The reservoir is the largest body of water in Bydgoszcz.

== Races ==
Bydgoszcz water race track was the venue for many events since its creation. Below are selected the main important ones:

- 29 June 1920, first All-Poland Regatta for the Polish Championship;
- 7 and 8 June 1920, qualifying races for the 1924 Summer Olympics;
- Polish Rowing Championships, from 1920 to 1937;
- 22 July 1928, qualifying regatta for the 1928 Summer Olympics;
- 16–19 August 1929, European Rowing Championships;
- 17 July 1932, first sailing and kayaking regatta for the Pomeranian championship in Brdyujście;
- 12 August 1945, first post-war Polish Rowing Championship regatta combined with the first Polish Kayak Championship regatta;
- Polish Canoeing Championships, in 1958, 1959, 1986, 1987, 1990, 2001, 2002, 2004, 2008, 2013;
- 2022, Masters World Championships (12–14 August) and University World Championships (16–18 September).

== See also ==
- Bydgoszcz
- Bydgoszcz Canal
- Czersko Polskie roller dam, Bydgoszcz
- German–Polish customs war

== Bibliography ==
- Kocerka, Henryk (2004). Historia kursu regatta w Brdyujście (1912–2004). Kronika Bydgoska T26 [History of the regatta course in Brdyujście (1912–2004). Bydgoszcz Chronicles T26] (in Polish). Bydgoszcz: Towarzystwo Miłosnikow Miasta Bydgoszczy – Bydgoskie Towarzystwo Naukowe. pp. 317–326.
