= Bydgoszcz Plywood Factory =

Plywood Company, Bydgoszcz, Poland, 20th and 21st century

Coordinates: 53°07′25″N 18°04′53″E

Bydgoskie Zakłady Sklejek
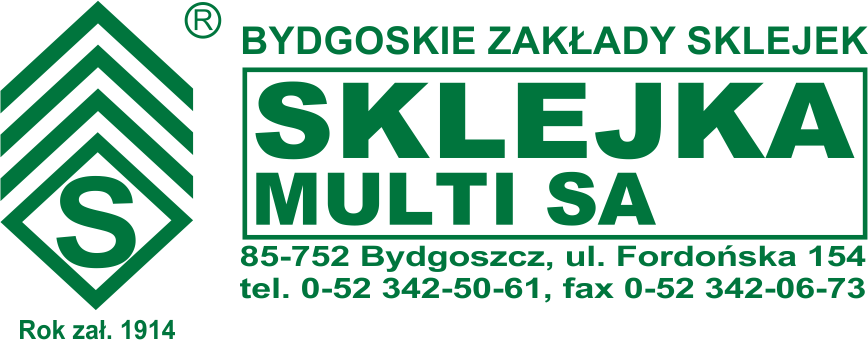

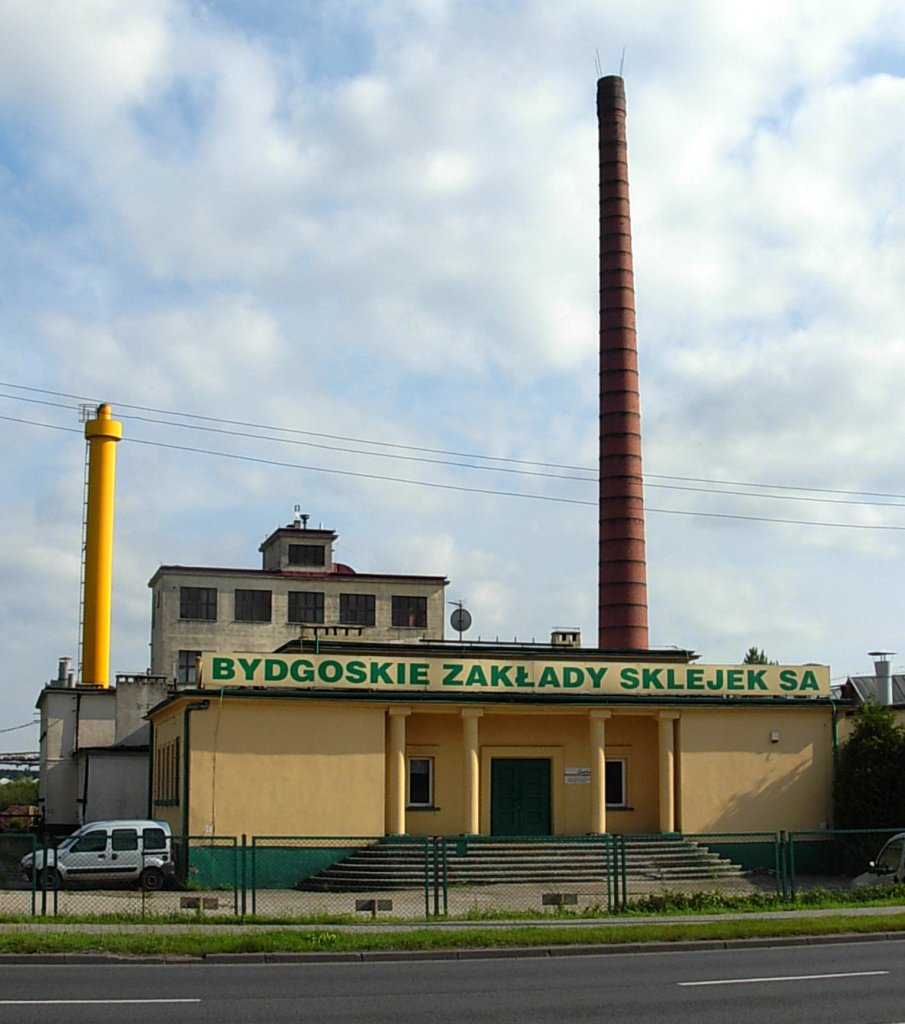
- Plant in Bydgoszcz
- Native name: Bydgoskie Zakłady Sklejek „Sklejka-Multi” SA
- Company type: Joint-stock company
- Industry: Plywood production
- Predecessor: Ostdeutsche Sperrplattenwerke AG
- Founded: 1914; 111 years ago
- Headquarters: 154 Fordońska Street, Bydgoszcz, Poland
- Area served: Europe
- Products: Plywood
- Number of employees: 345 (2018)
- Website: www.sklejka.pl/en/

Bydgoskie Zakłady Sklejek "Sklejka-Multi" SA (Bydgoszcz Plywood Factory) is a Polish factory in the city of Bydgoszcz that manufactures plywood. It is one of the few producers in Poland and was first established in 1914.

== History ==
=== Prussian period ===
The ancestor of company's of today's "Sklejka-Multi" was founded in 1914, under Ostdeutsche Sperrplattenwerke AG (English: East German plywood works), also called "Oswa". The plant, located in the eastern industrial district of then Bromberg, covered an area of 5 hectares (12 acres): it also comprised a storage warehouse on the Brda river, where the floated wood was matured. Initially the production of wooden blockboards required only two hulling machines, a machine press and a drying plant.

The establishment of "Oswa" was associated with the fast development of the wood industry in Bromberg, which culminated in 1906, when one third of all timber shipments towards the German Empire transited through the city. As a matter of fact, at that time, 2100 people were working for this business in Bromberg (mainly in sawmills and woodworking workshops). Between 1890 and 1907, on the banks of the Brda river (near present day Brda's regatta track), there were up to 25 active sawmills, most of which were large plants owned by timber traders from Berlin. The importance of the industry in the city massively influenced the development of wood-processing plants in the area (i.e. furniture, boxes, boards, parquet, matches).

=== Interwar period ===
With the end of World War I and the return of Bydgoszcz to the re-created Poland, the company -now Polish- underwent a rapid development. New equipment was purchased and plywood production (80% of which was exported) now used non-dried wood (so called "wet" method).

The Great Depression of the late 1920s constrained first a reduction of the activity, and then a complete suspension of the operations in 1930. In 1931, the facility was purchased by the shareholders of the company Fabryka Płyt Klejonych w Bydgoszczy (English: Bydgoszcz Glued Boards Factory): this successful firm was the second largest plywood producer in Poland, exporting in the whole Europe (United Kingdom, Netherlands, Denmark, France, Belgium, Sweden and Italy). After changing its name to Fabryka Dykt Klejonych „Multipli", the plant continued to struggle with economic decline.

After several attempts to put up the company for auction, it was once again bought by the Directorate of State Forests in 1935. The latter also built a modern sawmill in Siernieczek, today an eastern district of Bydgoszcz. About 600 people were working there in three shifts. In 1936, the company had 7 husking machines, 5 presses, 3 pulse presses for drying hulls and 2 drying rooms. Furthermore, the production panel was enriched with the so-called "dry-resistant plywood", made by incorporating casein glue and albumin. The basic output still relied on wet-glued plywood and carpentry boards.

A significant part of the manufacturing was exported to several European and overseas countries. At the eve of World War II, the Państwowa Fabryka Sklejek w Bydgoszczy (Bydgoszcz State Plywood Factory), employing more than 1000 people, was the largest in its domain in Poland, accounting for 10% of the domestic production.

=== German occupation ===
During German occupation, the factory moved under the management of the German administration. It continued production aimed at satisfying the needs of the war effort. Dry-resistant plywood and aviation plywood were manufactured for the benefit of the Luftwaffe. The workforce at the time was approximately 400 people.

=== Polish People's Republic (1947-1989) ===
On February 15, 1945, the "Regional Directorate of State Forests" in Toruń (Polish: Regionalna Dyrekcja Lasów Państwowych w Toruniu) took over the management of the plant. At the time, the raw material used was basic pine wood, provided by the "Bydgoszcz District of State Forests". Furthermore, the timber supply flow was re-organized, in order to use rail transport instead of the waterway floating (on the Brda river). In 1949, the production reached:

- 10,000 m^{3} of dry-resistant plywood;
- 24 m^{3} of aircraft-grade plywood;
- 104 m^{3} of carpentry boards;
- 774 m^{3} of waterproof plywood.

The factory was then incorporated into the Union of the Board, Plywood and Match Industry based in Warsaw. Employment grew steadily, from 531 people (1948) to 686 people including 356 women (1954).

From 1954 onwards, the panel of production broaden, to cover:

- waterproof wooden boards for shipbuilding industry;
- pressed wood for the production of weaving shuttles;
- plywood for formwork, bakelite and reinforced, self-lubricating pressed wood (1965);
- TV canisters, slates and railway spacers, chairs, boards for agricultural purposes.

In 1969, a pioneering production line was launched, using technology purchased in Finland. In addition, the production of phenolic resin started.

In 1970, the plywood manufacture merged with the Bydgoszcz Tanning Extract Factory (Polish: Fabryka Ekstraktów Garbarskich w Bydgoszczy) under the name of Plywood and Wood Plants Chemical Processing (Polish: Zakłady Sklejek i Chemicznego Przerobu Drewna). The new company had two manufacturing sites (no.1 on Przemysłowa street and no.2 on Fordońska street) and was active in the wood as well as the chemical industries. It specialized in the following productions:

- tannins;
- furfural, as the only producer in the country;
- particle boards, fiberboards;
- various plywoods (dry-resistant, waterproof, aeronautical grade, modeling - the only manufacturer in Poland);
- formwork, pressed wood;
- filter plates for the chemical industry;
- glues (phenol-based and waterproof).

The production variety and value elevated the Bydgoszcz factory to the first place in the plywood industry business in Poland. Its products fed numerous other sectors: building engineering, furniture, shipbuilding, leather trade, chemical and heavy industries.

In the early 1970s, a modernization occurred, in particular with the launch of a waterproof plywood production line. Unfortunately, a large fire broke out on 31 January 1972, paralyzing the operations for 5 months: the flames, reaching 40 metres (130 ft) high, entirely consumed the production hall. Despite this disaster, a year after the plywood output nearly reached 14,000 m^{3}, of which 10% was exported. Additionally, the workforce in this period attained its historical high, with more than 1,000 people.

In 1976, an overhaul of the sites was carried out, encompassing the following:

- construction of a tall oil processing department;
- expansion of the phenol-resin glue production line;
- production of charcoal from furfural manufacturing byproducts.

=== Third Polish Republic (since 1989) ===
In the 1990s, after the end of the communist rule, the Bydgoszcz Tanning Extract Factory was sold and the Plywood plant at Fordońska street transformed in 1994 into a joint-stock company, Bydgoskie Zakłady Sklejek "Sklejka-Multi" SA. A year earlier, new equipments were purchased from Switzerland and Austria, enriching the product offer with soundproofing plywood, furniture strips and foils surfaced plywood. Additional production device were acquired purchased in the following years: 2004, 2007 and 2014.

In 2000, a boiler room for biomass was built, allowing the site to become heat-producing self-sufficient. Thanks to EU funds (4 million Polish złoty), Sklejka-Multi SA bought in 2015 a new production line for wood peeling.

In December 2018, a large investment program (25 million PLN) was initiated, enabling the acquisition of a six-shelf veneer dryer apparatus, the only one of its kind in Poland. This machine replaced two older dryers, occupying less room space and performing tasks faster and more accurately.

== Products ==
The company manufactures plywood from various deciduous trees (beech, birch, alder) and coniferous (pine)

The company's main products are:

- waterproof and dry-resistant plywood for general purposes
- waterproof technical plywood (formwork, bakelite, foiled, sound-proofing, fire-retardant)
- furniture strips
- phenol foils
- phenolic resin glues

Plywood is used as well in construction, furniture market, automotive industry, shipbuilding and packaging.

The firm follows a quality management system according to ISO and FSC standards. More than half of its yield is exported to Western Europe countries.

== Cooperation with scientific units ==
The factory cooperates, among others, with the following scientific bodies:

- Wood Technology Institute (Polish: Instytut Technologii Drewna) of Poznań;
- University of Life Sciences in Poznań;
- R&D Center of the Wood-Based Panels Industry (Polish: Ośrodek Badawczo-Rozwojowy Przemysłu Płyt Drewnopochodnych) in Czarna Woda;
- Medical University of Gdańsk - Faculty of Maritime and Tropical Medicine in Gdynia;
- Railway Institute in Warsaw;
- Industrial Automotive Institute (Polish: Przemysłowy Instytut Motoryzacji) in Warsaw;
- National Institute of Public Health – National Institute of Hygiene in Warsaw;
- Polish Register of Shipping in Gdańsk;
- Institute of Building Technology (Polish: Instytut Techniki Budowlanej) in Warsaw;
- Institute of Rail Vehicles (Polish: Instytut Pojazdów Szynowych „Tabor”) in Poznań;
- Ship Technology Center (Polish: Centrum Techniki Okrętowej) in Gdańsk;
- Technischer Überwachungsverein Rheinland/Berlin-Brandenburg e.V., Germany.

The staff of the company co-initiated and co-founded the "Association of Wood-Based Boards Producers in Poland" (Polish: Stowarzyszenie Producentów Płyt Drewnopochodnych w Polsce).

== See also ==
- Bydgoszcz
- Bydgoszcz Furniture Factory
- Forests of Poland
- Wood industry
- Molded plywood

== Bibliography ==
- (in Polish) Kosień, Tadeusz (2014). 100 lat Bydgoskich "Sklejek". Kalendarz Bydgoski [100 years of Bydgoszcz "Plywood". Bydgoszcz Calendar.] (in Polish). Bydgoszcz: Towarzystwo Miłośników Miasta Bydgoszczy. pp. 182–185.
- (in Polish) Brakowski, Konrad (1975). Udany mariaż dwóch zakładów. Kalendarz Bydgoski [A successful marriage of two plants. Bydgoszcz Calendar.] (in Polish). Bydgoszcz: Towarzystwo Miłośników Miasta Bydgoszczy. pp. 53–63.
- (in Polish) Derenda, Jerzy (2016). Sklejka Multi S.A. stawia na nowoczesną produkcję. Kalendarz Bydgoski [Plywood Multi S.A. focuses on modern production. Bydgoszcz Calendar] (in Polish). Bydgoszcz: Towarzystwo Miłośników Miasta Bydgoszczy. pp. 194–195.
