= Solidarity Bridges =

Bridges in Bydgoszcz

Solidarity Bridges (Polish: Mosty Solidarności) are a complex of six bridges (four road and two tram bridges) spanning the Brda and Młynówka rivers in Bydgoszcz, Poland. They serve as a vital east-west transportation corridor along Ferdynanda Focha Street and include two roadways and a tram line.

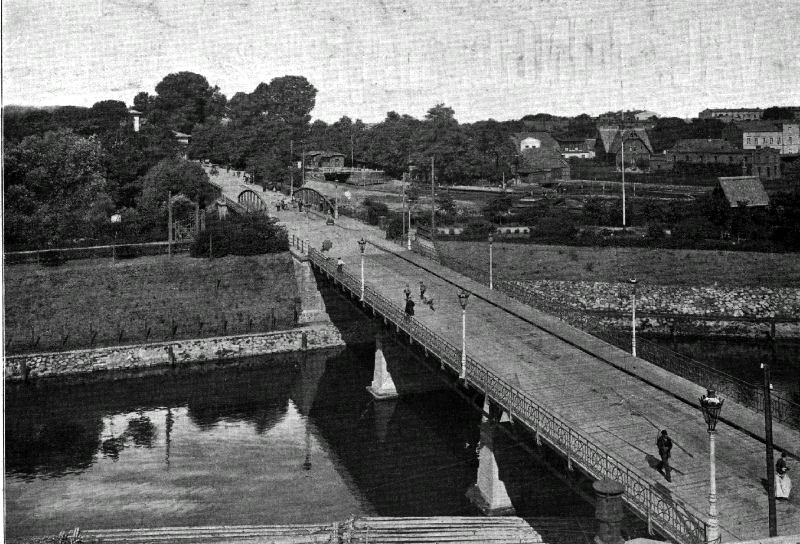
Historical Wilhelm and Port Bridges (1890–1945)

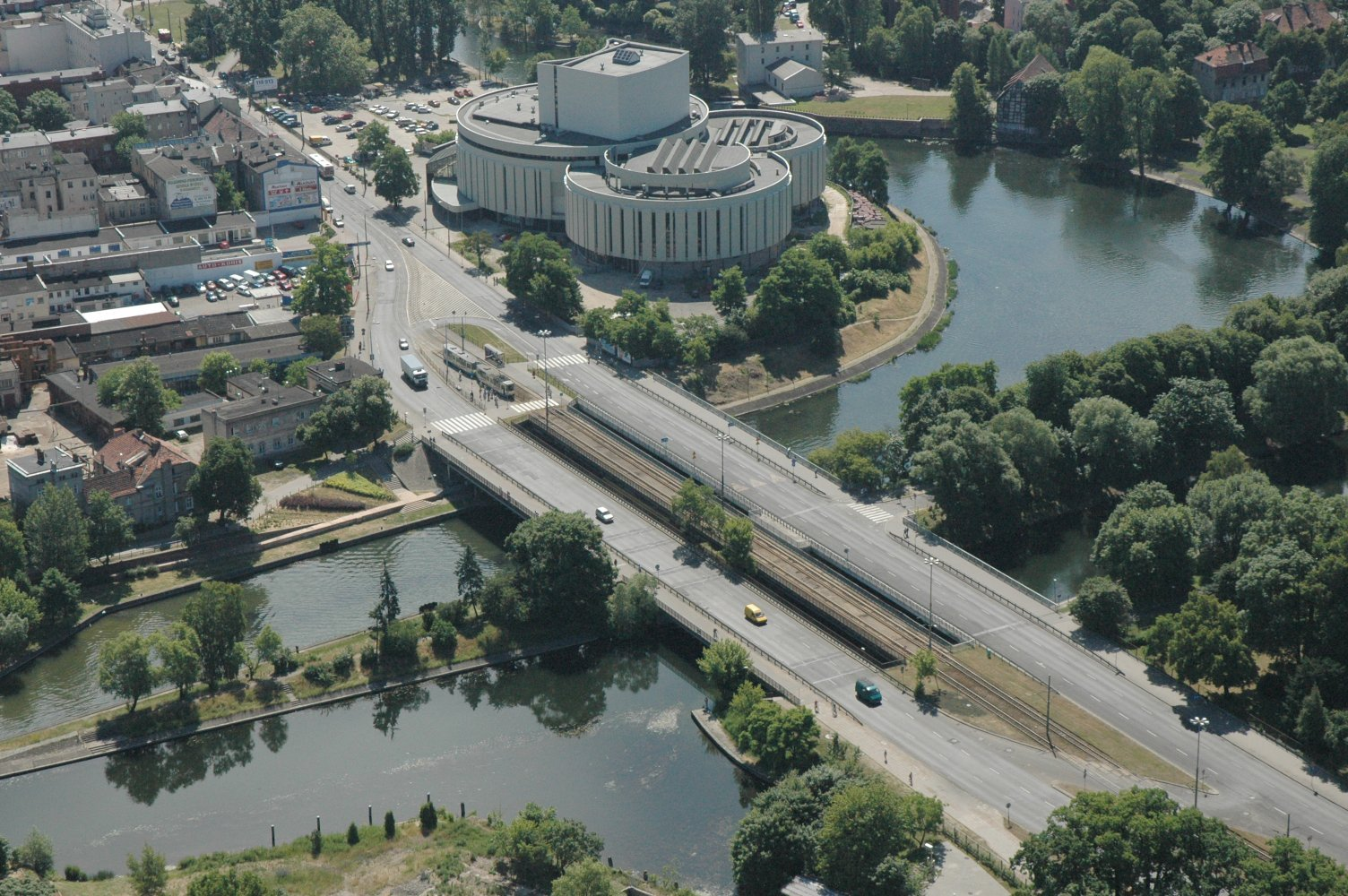
Aerial view of the Solidarity Bridges

== Location ==
The bridges are located just north of Bydgoszcz's Old Town, connecting both banks of the Brda and Młynówka rivers. The route along Focha Street is one of the city's primary thoroughfares. Tram lines 1, 3, 5, and 8 run across the bridges.

== Names ==
Over time, the bridges and Focha Street have had several names reflecting political changes:

- 1840–1920 – Wilhelmsbrücke (Wilhelm Bridge) and Hafenbrücke (Port Bridge)
- 1920–1931 – Jagielloński and Portowy
- 1931–1939 – Marshal Ferdinand Foch Bridge
- 1939–1945 – Hermann Göring Brücke
- 1945–1949 – Ferdinand Foch
- 1950–1990 – Red Army
- 1990–2005 – Ferdinand Foch
- Since 2005 – Solidarity

The original names referred to Prussian royalty and Bydgoszcz's port. The current name commemorates the Solidarity movement.

== History ==
The first crossings were built before 1840, forming part of the route west from Bydgoszcz via Nakło and Piła.

Between 1885–1890, the original bridges were replaced: Wilhelmsbrücke and Hafenbrücke were rebuilt with modern materials and aligned straight across both rivers. They featured steel and stone elements, decorative railings, and gas lamps.

The bridges were destroyed by Polish troops in September 1939, then temporarily rebuilt by German forces and destroyed again in January 1945.

In the 1950s, two new road bridges were built in reinforced prestressed concrete – the first in Poland to use cable-concrete technology – designed by M. Bieniek, M. Wolf, and H. Żółtowski.

In the 1970s, due to deterioration, tram speeds were limited. New tram and road bridges were built (1977–1982), designed by Antoni Malczewski. The older bridges were then repaired and strengthened, a process completed in 1996.

In 2005, the Bydgoszcz City Council officially named the group of bridges "Solidarity Bridges". They are managed by the Municipal Roads and Public Transport Authority.

In 2019, unexpected wear on the southern bridges required additional structural repair, delaying completion until October.

== Technical details ==
=== Southern Port Bridge ===
- Built: 1955
- Type: Prestressed reinforced concrete, 3-span
- Length: 69.06 m (spans: 15.6 + 38.0 + 15.5 m)
- Width: 18.9 m (roadway 11.5 m, sidewalks 5.5 m)
- Load capacity: 40 tonnes

=== Southern Młynówka Bridge ===
- Built: 1955
- Type: Prestressed reinforced concrete, 3-span
- Length: 45.36 m (spans: 8.55 + 27.97 + 8.84 m)
- Width: 18.82 m (roadway 11.5 m, sidewalks 5.75 m)
- Load capacity: 40 tonnes

=== Tramway Port Bridge ===
- Built: 1981
- Type: Steel-concrete, 4-span
- Length: 70.78 m
- Width: 8.3 m (2 tram tracks)

=== Tramway Młynówka Bridge ===
- Built: 1981
- Type: Steel, 3-span
- Length: 48 m
- Width: 8.3 m

=== Northern Port Bridge ===
- Built: 1981
- Type: Steel-concrete, 4-span
- Length: 70.78 m (spans: 11 + 38 + 11 + 10.6 m)
- Width: 17.3 m (roadway 10.5 m, sidewalk 5.4 m)
- Load capacity: 30 tonnes

=== Northern Młynówka Bridge ===
- Built: 1981
- Type: Steel, 3-span
- Length: 48 m (spans: 10 + 28 + 10 m)
- Width: 17.3 m (roadway 10.5 m, sidewalk 5.4 m)
- Load capacity: 30 tonnes

== Traffic ==
The bridges handle one of the highest traffic volumes in Bydgoszcz. In 2006, peak hourly traffic reached around 2,330 vehicles.

== Sightseeing ==
The Solidarity Bridges offer views of Bydgoszcz landmarks such as the Bydgoszcz Cathedral, Opera Nova, and the Młyn Island. The Bydgoszcz Water Tram passes under the bridges several times daily (April to October). (Note: Operation period: April to October)

== Gallery ==
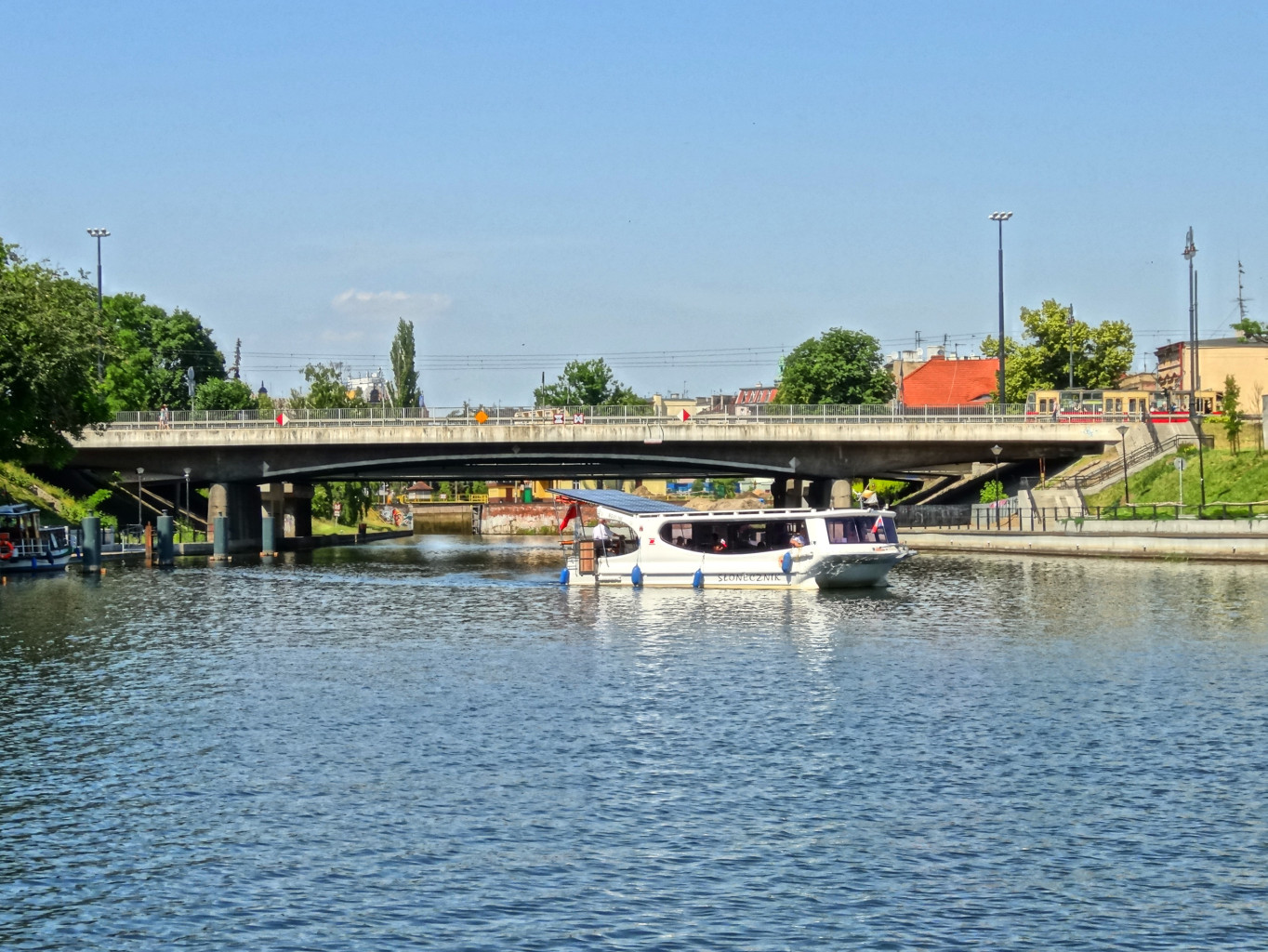

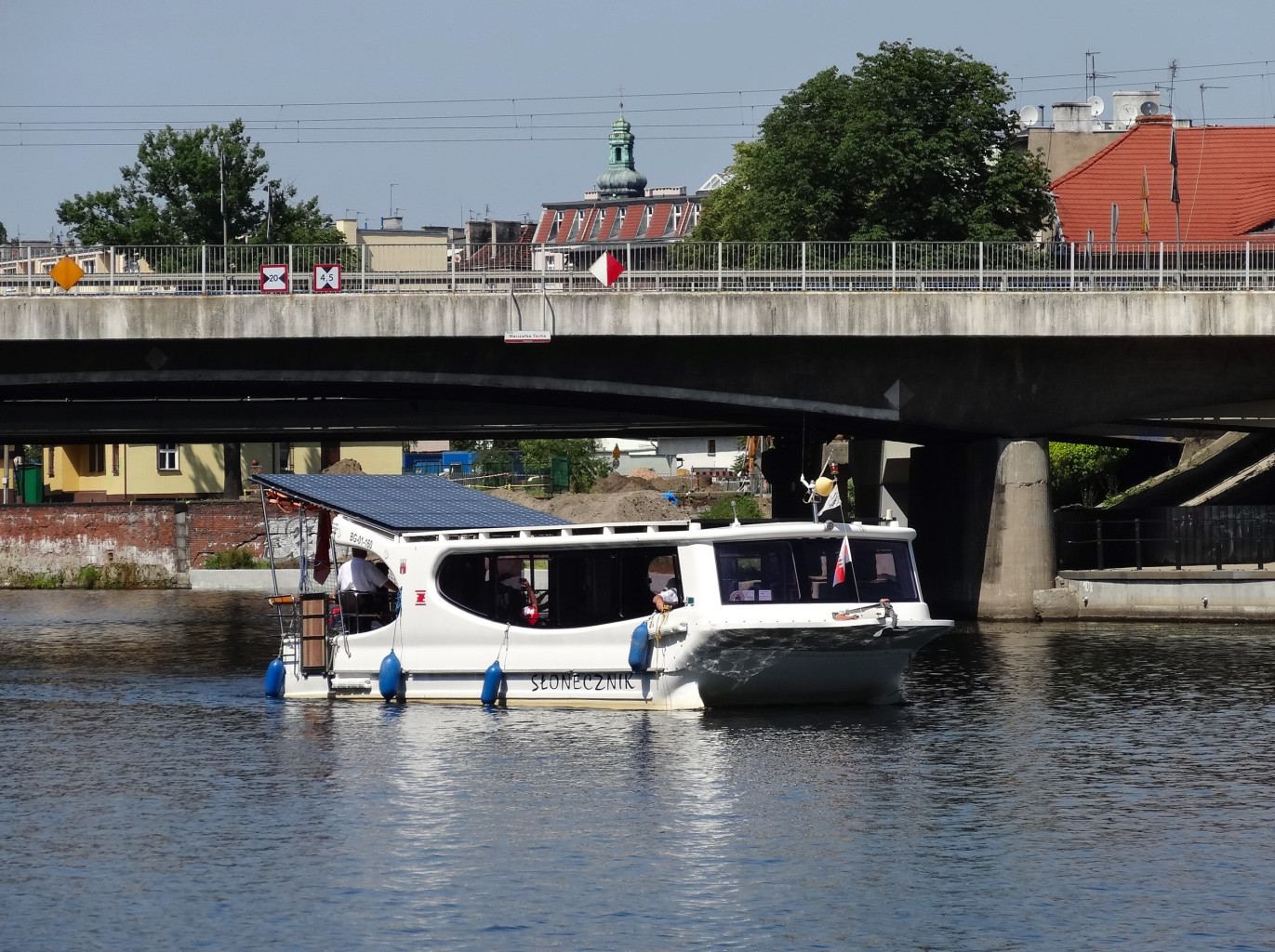

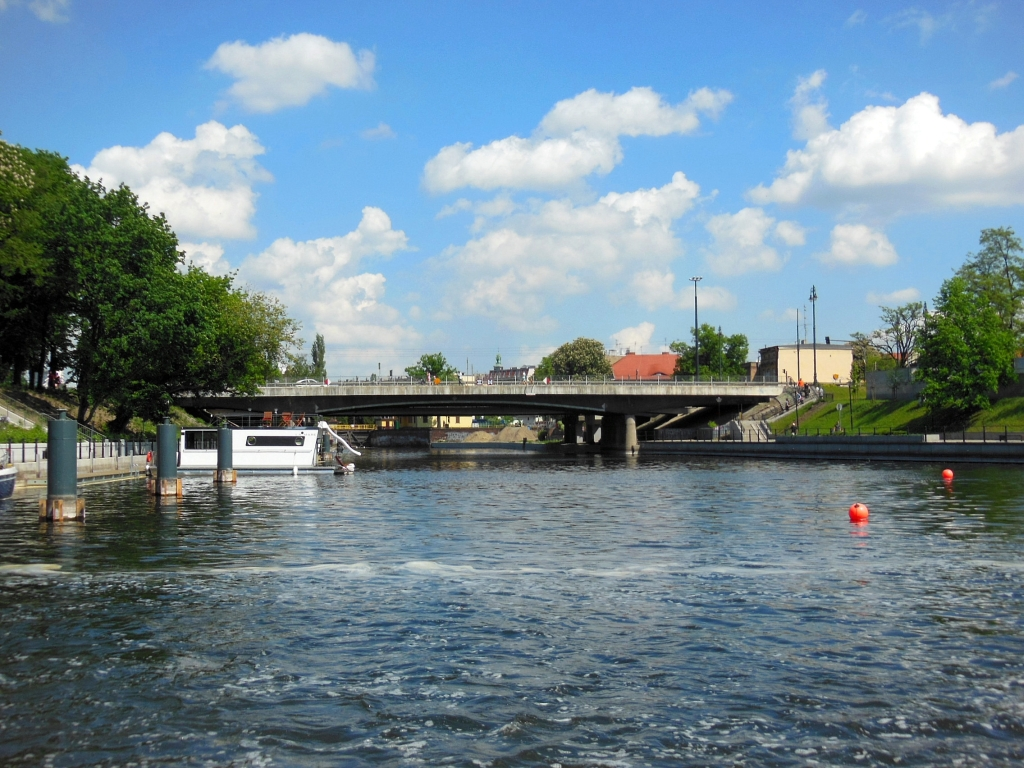

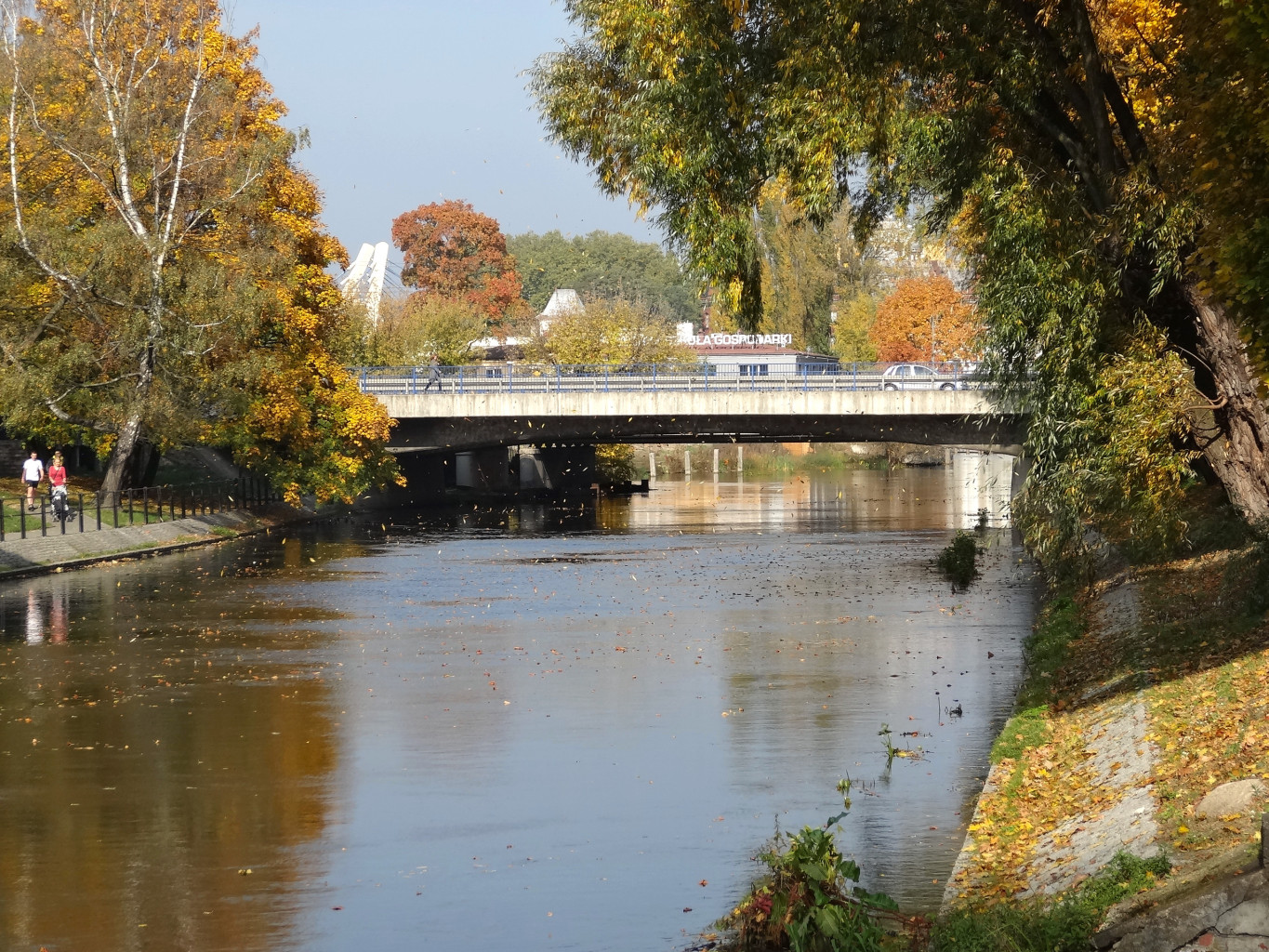

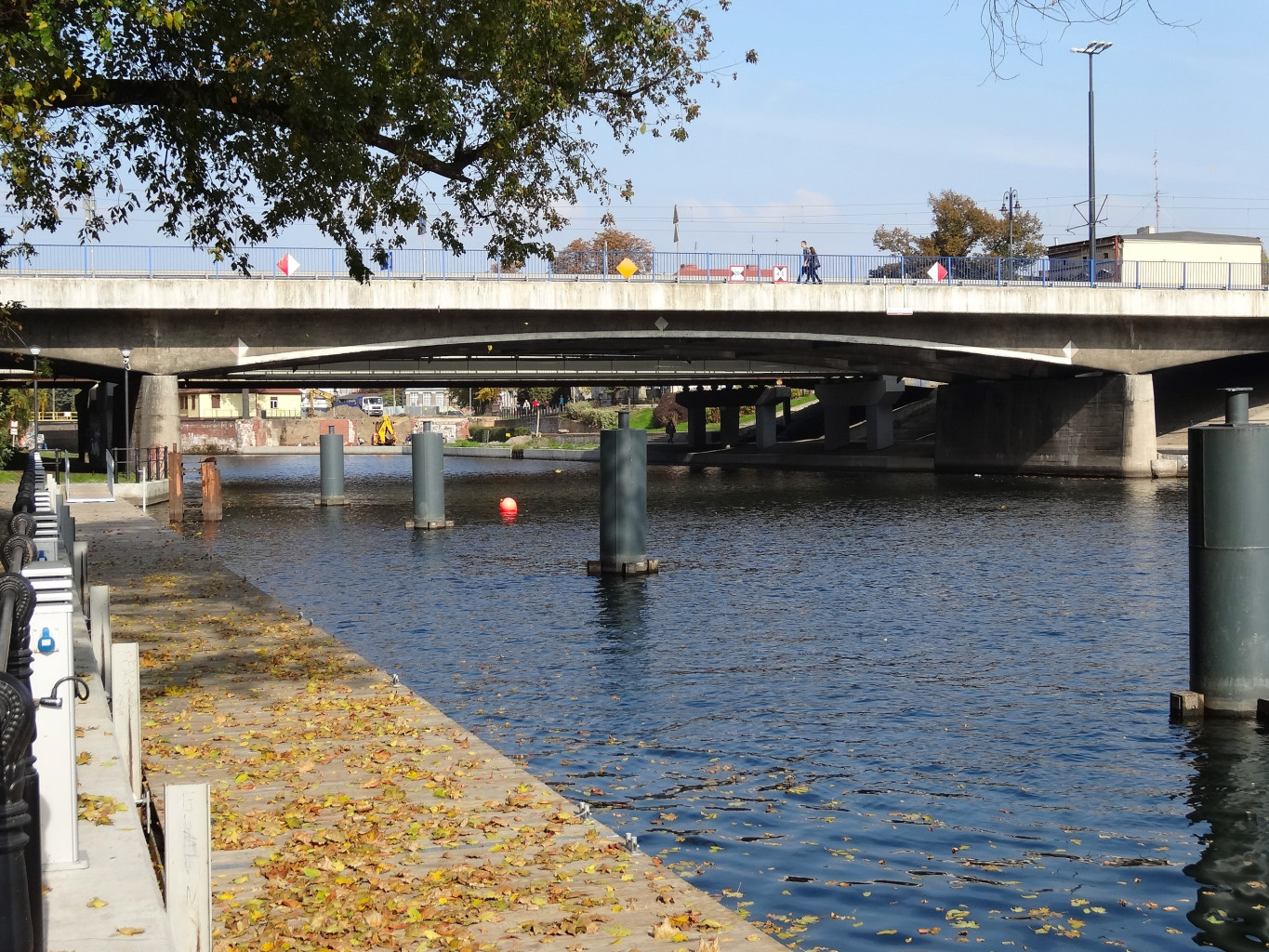

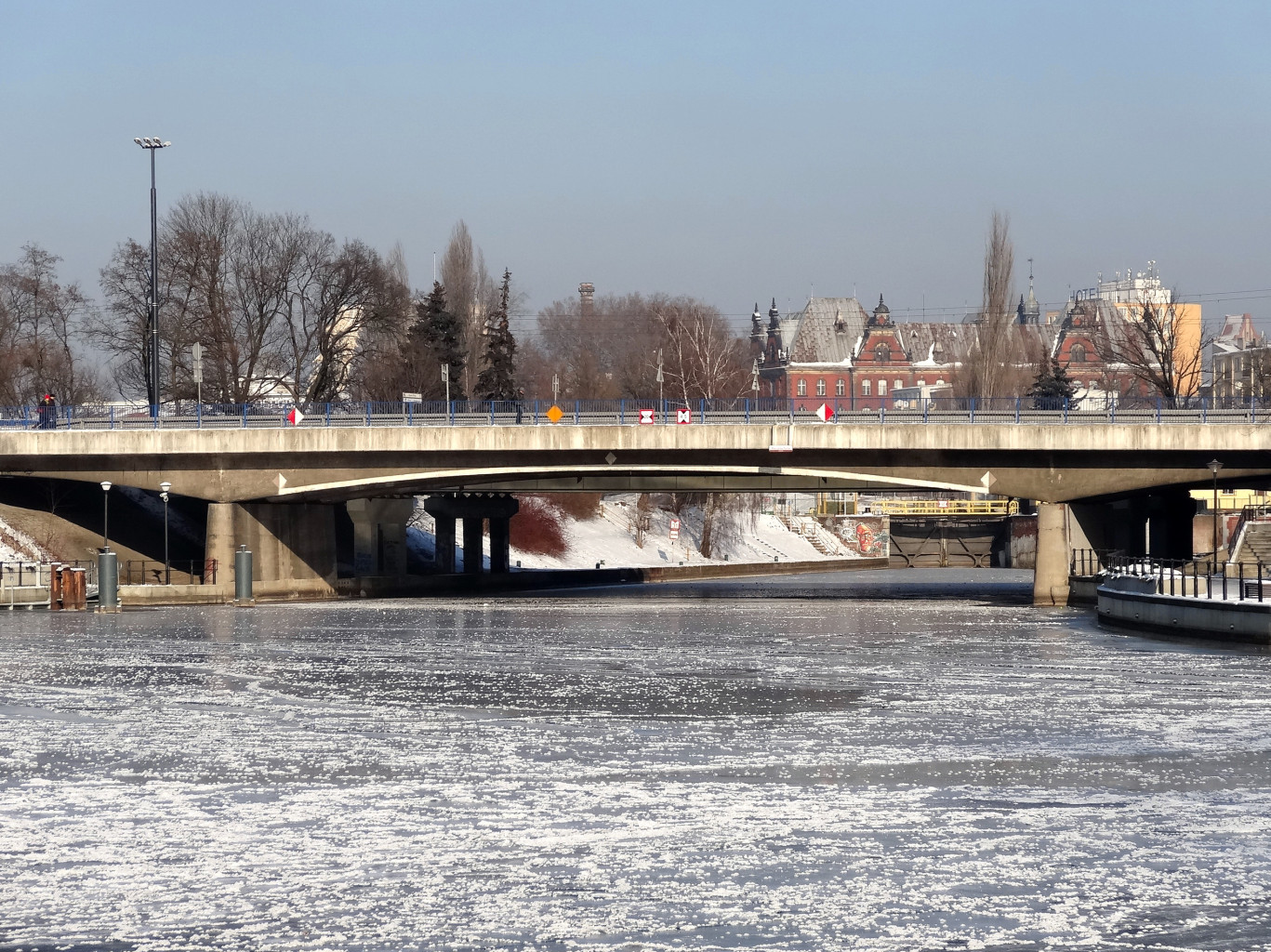

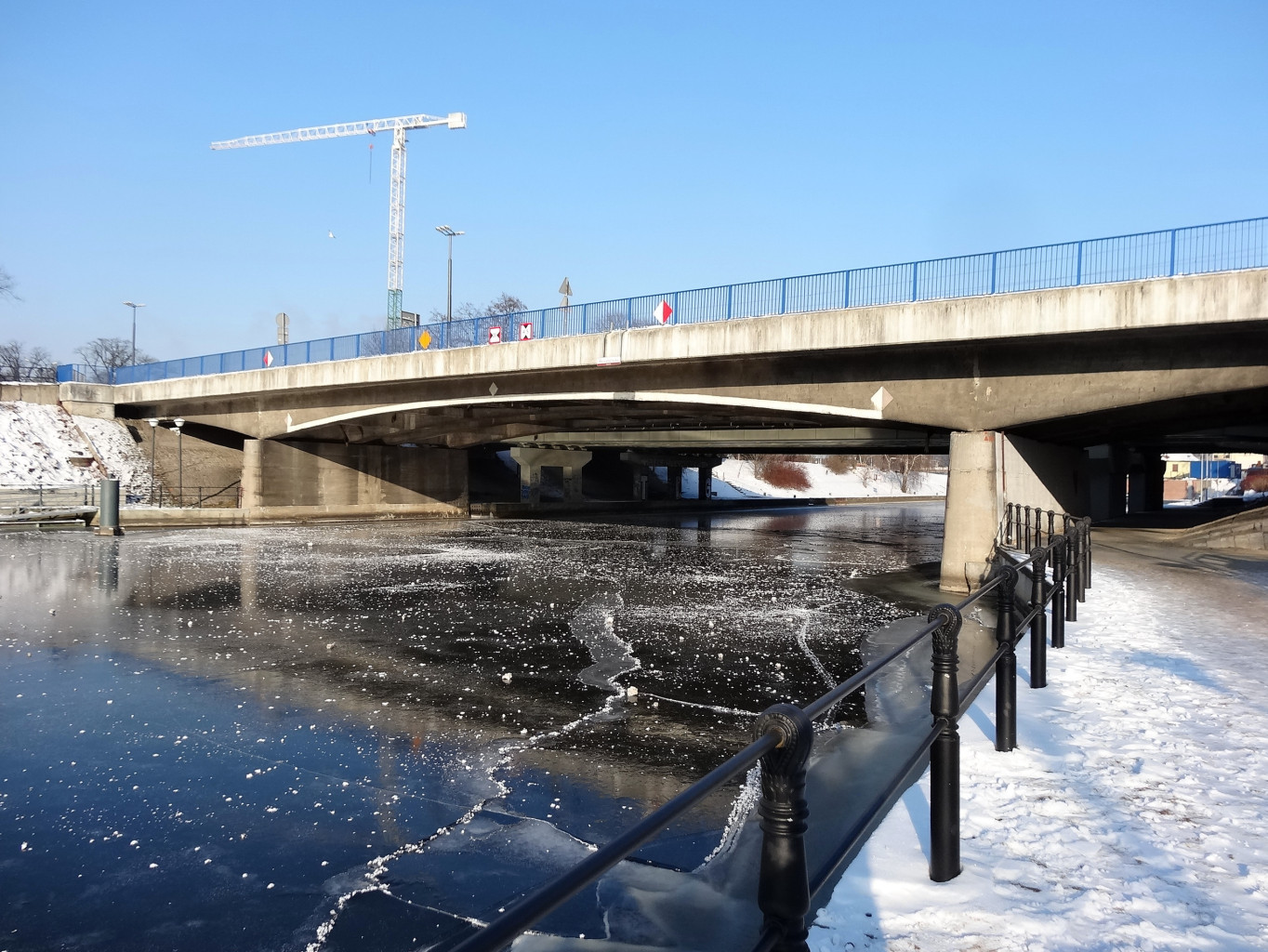

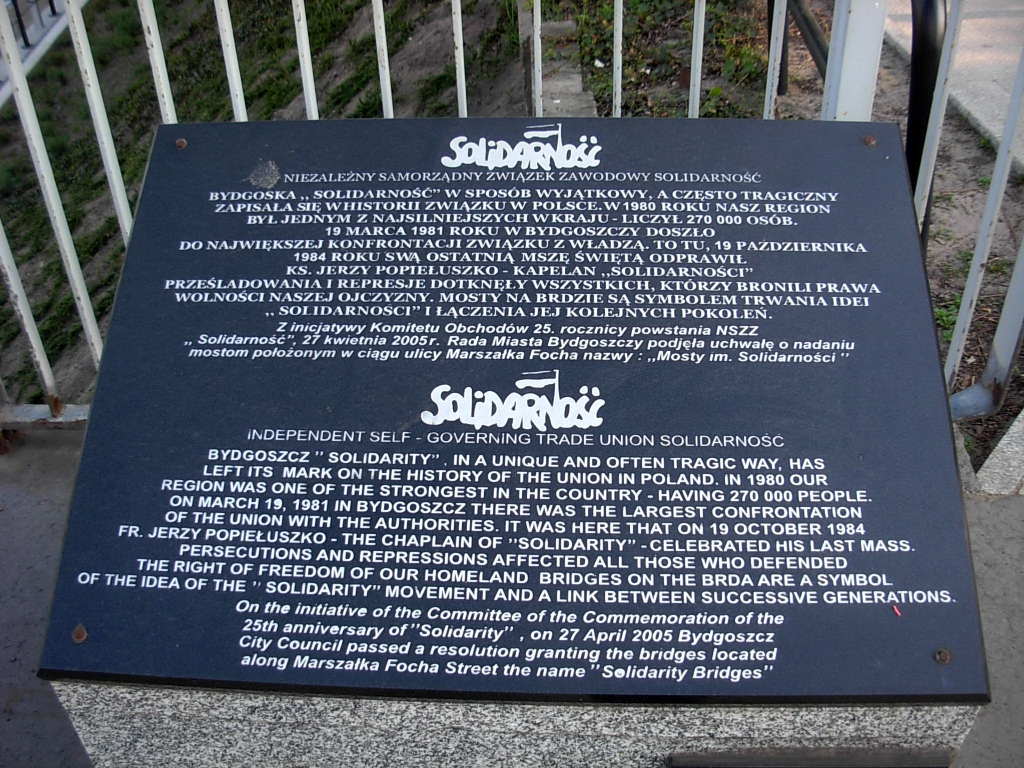

== See also ==
- Brda River

== Bibliography ==
- Daria Bręczewska-Kulesza. Bydgoszcz w stronę Okola. Bydgoszcz 2004. ISBN 83-921725-0-7
- K. Marek Jeleniewski. ... której nie ma. Bydgoszcz na starej widokówce. Bydgoszcz 2001. ISBN 83-87586-17-X
- Jacek Kajczuk. "Mosty i wiadukty". In: Bydgoska Gospodarka Komunalna. Bydgoszcz 1996
- Stanisław Michalski (ed.). Bydgoszcz wczoraj i dziś 1945-1980. PWN. Warsaw-Poznań 1988
- Krzysztof Dudek (ed.). Monografia mostów województwa kujawsko-pomorskiego. Brda i Kanał Bydgoski. Vol. II. Bydgoszcz–Grudziądz 2012. ISBN 978-83-934160-2-8
- Janusz Umiński. "Brzegiem Brdy do Brdyujścia." In: Kalendarz Bydgoski 2001
