= Długosza and Siemiradzkiego streets in Bydgoszcz =

Streets in Bydgoszcz, Poland

Henryka Siemiradzkiego street and Księdza Jana Długosza street
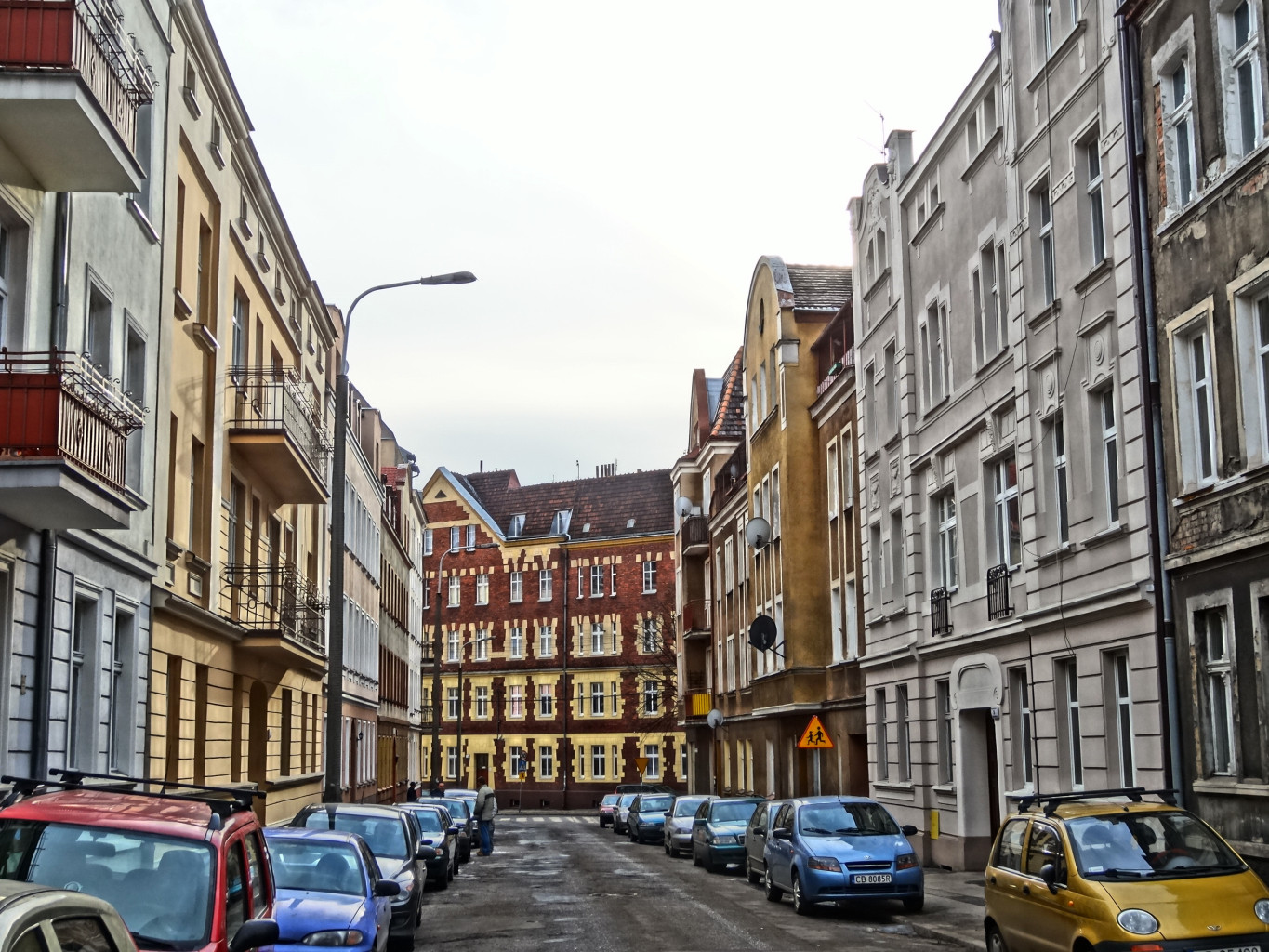
- View of Siemiradzkiego street to the south

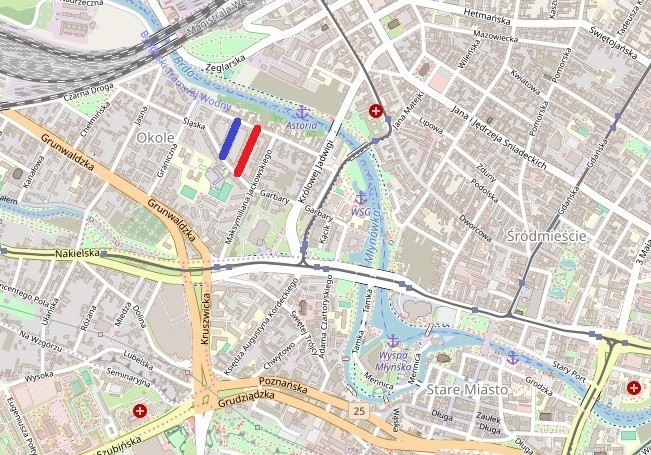
- Długosza street (red) and Siemiradzkiego street (blue)
- Native name: Ulica Henryka Siemiradzkiego, Ulica Księdza Jana Długosza w Bydgoszczy (Polish)
- Former name: Sophienstraße (Długosza street) / Margarethentraße (Siemiradzkiego street)
- Part of: Okole district
- Namesake: Jan Długosz, Henryk Siemiradzki
- Owner: City of Bydgoszcz
- Length: 150 m (490 ft)
- Width: 10 metres (33 ft)
- Location: Bydgoszcz, Poland
- Coordinates: 53°07′46″N 17°59′18″E
- Major junctions: Władysława Łokietka street, Śląska street

Construction
- Construction start: 1905 (Długosza street), 1906 (Siemiradzkiego street)
- Completion: 1910 (Długosza street), 1911 (Siemiradzkiego street)

Długosza and Siemiradzkiego streets are two short paths in the city of Bydgoszcz, Poland. Their rapid constructions within a few years in the early 1900s was translated into a uniformity of Art Nouveau facades.

== Location and naming ==
Both streets are located in downtown Bydgoszcz, in the Okole district. They run in parallel along an approximately south to north axis, from Śląska street to Władysława Łokietka street. Długosza street is 180 metres (590 ft) long while Siemiradzkiego street 140 metres (460 ft) long.

Through history, these streets bore the following names:

- Till the early 1900s, the area was called "Kanal werder" (Canal peninsula);
- From their construction till 1920, Sophienstraße (Długosza street) / Margarethentraße (Siemiradzkiego street);
- 1920–1939, Ulica Długosza and Ulica Siemiradzkiego ;
- 1939–1945, Sophienstraße (Długosza street) / Margarethentraße (Siemiradzkiego street);
- since 1945, Ulica Długosza and Ulica Siemiradzkiego .

The current namesake of these streets come from:

- Jan Długosz (1415–1480), a Polish priest, chronicler, diplomat, soldier, and secretary to Bishop Zbigniew Oleśnicki of Kraków. He is considered Poland's first historian;
- Henryk Siemiradzki (1843–1902), a Polish painter.

== History ==
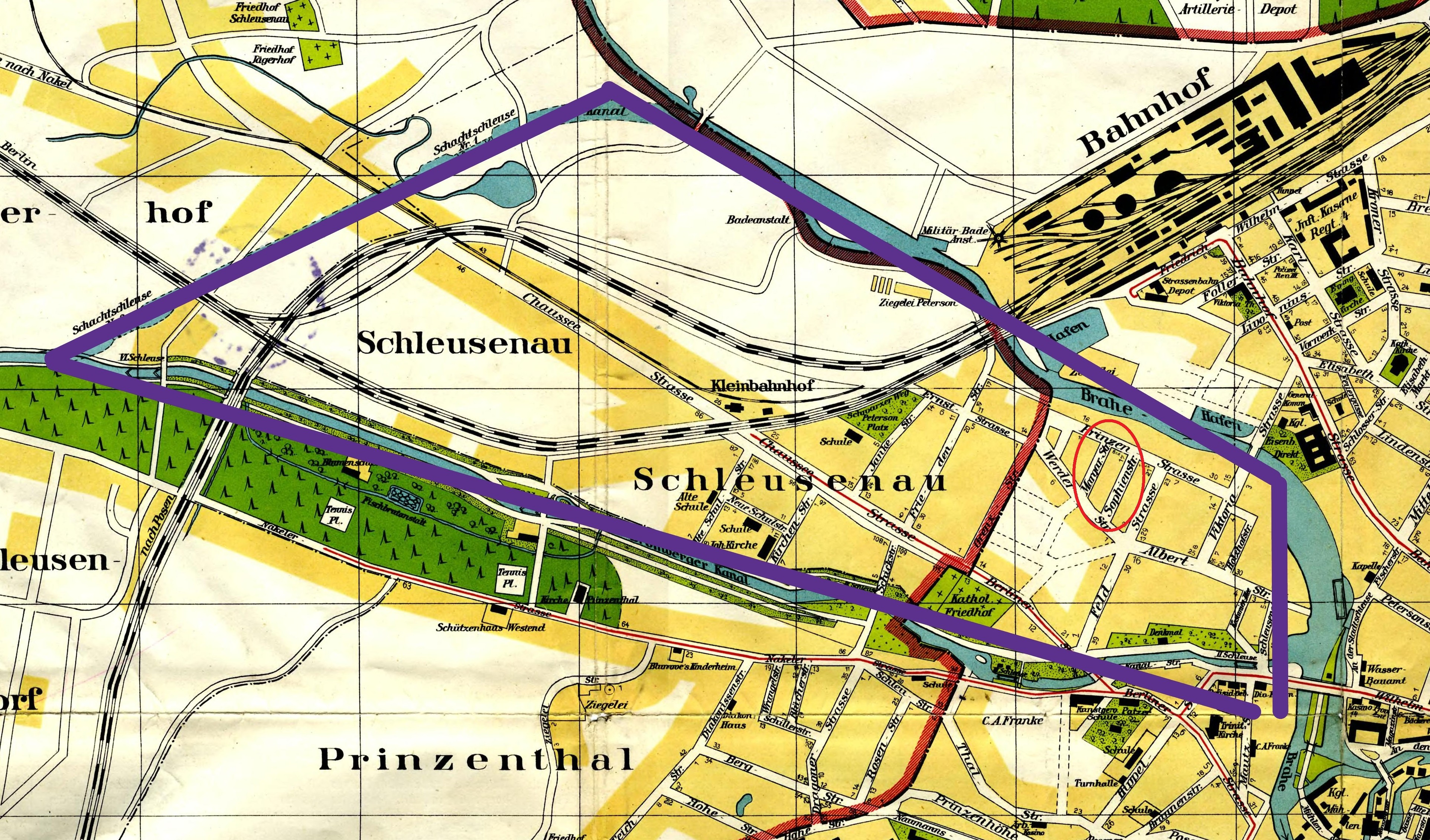
Schleusenau district in purple - Sophienstraße / Margarethentraße in red (1914)

During Prussian time (1772–1920), the Okole district where both are laid was called Kanal werder (Canal peninsula). The term referred to the fact that the triangular area was almost surrounded by water ways: to the south was the Bydgoszcz Canal and to the north the Brda river. The district (renamed Schleusenau) became even an artificial island when a new branch of the Bydgoszcz canal was completed in 1915, locking up the area.

The first constructions only started in 1905, at avery quick pace: a vast majority of the buildings in both streets were completed by the end of 1910.

The district was preserved from both WWII destruction and soviet-time estate projects. Since the 2010s, the municipal authorities have been carrying out many renovation works in these avenues, in order to bring back their original Art Nouveau features.

== Main edifices ==
=== Długosza street ===
Tenement at 1, corner with 6 Śląska Street

1922, by Georg Baesler

Modern architecture

The first landlor, Wycenty Ochocki, was a tailor living in the tenement giving onto Śląska street (then called Błonia street). Stefan Ciszewski and his family lived there till WWII: Stefan was a successful Polish electrical engineer who founded in 1923 of Bydgoska Fabryka Artykułów Elektrotechnicznych (today Schneider Electric Elda S.A.), one of the oldest electrotechnical firms in Poland.

This building is the only one built with modernist features, in vogue in the 1920s. It is remarkable by its numerous bay windows. Furthermore, the portal is flanked with columns and a lintel decorated with a plastered medallion displaying a child holding grapes. It has been refurbished in 2019.

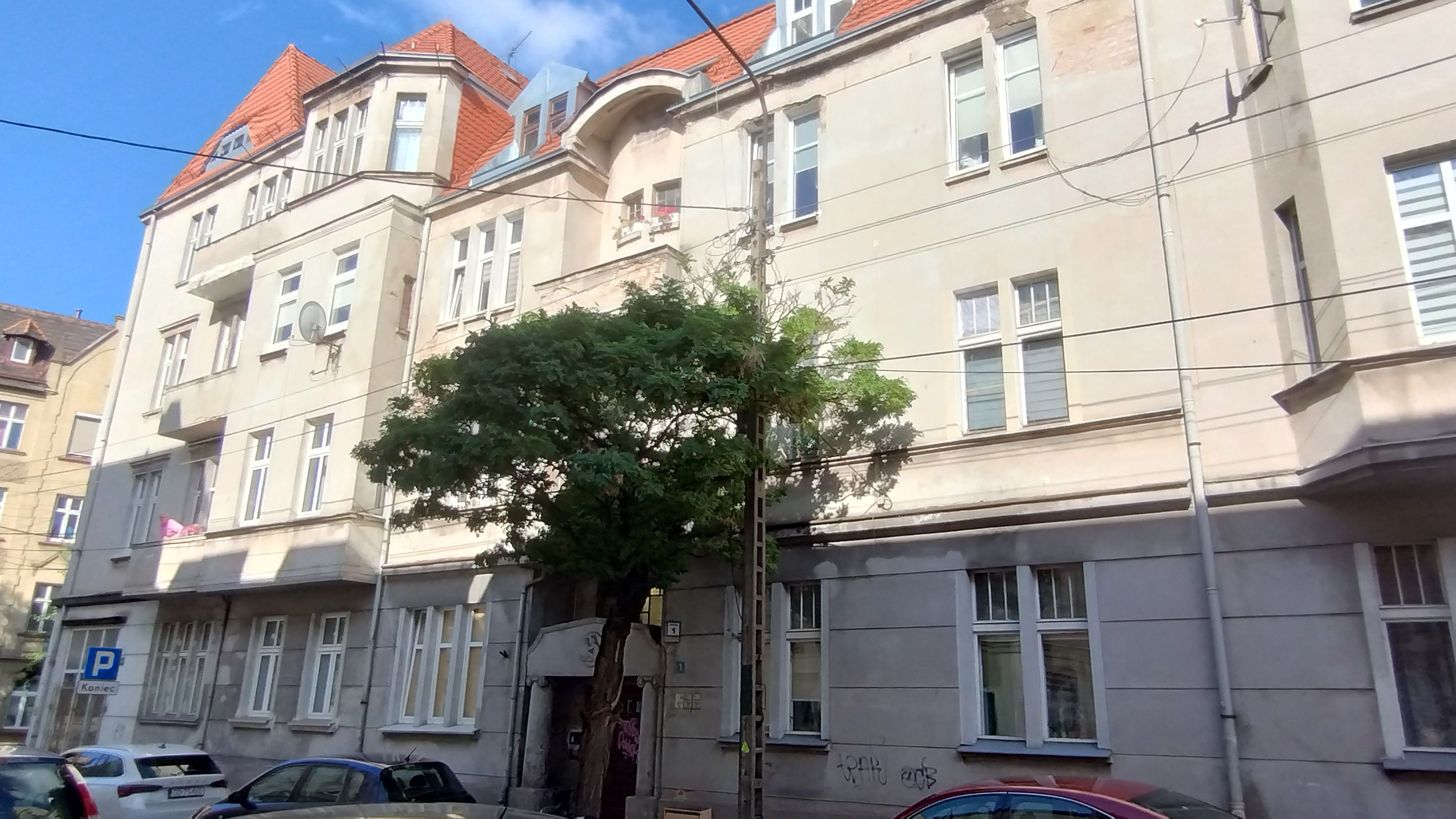
Main facade

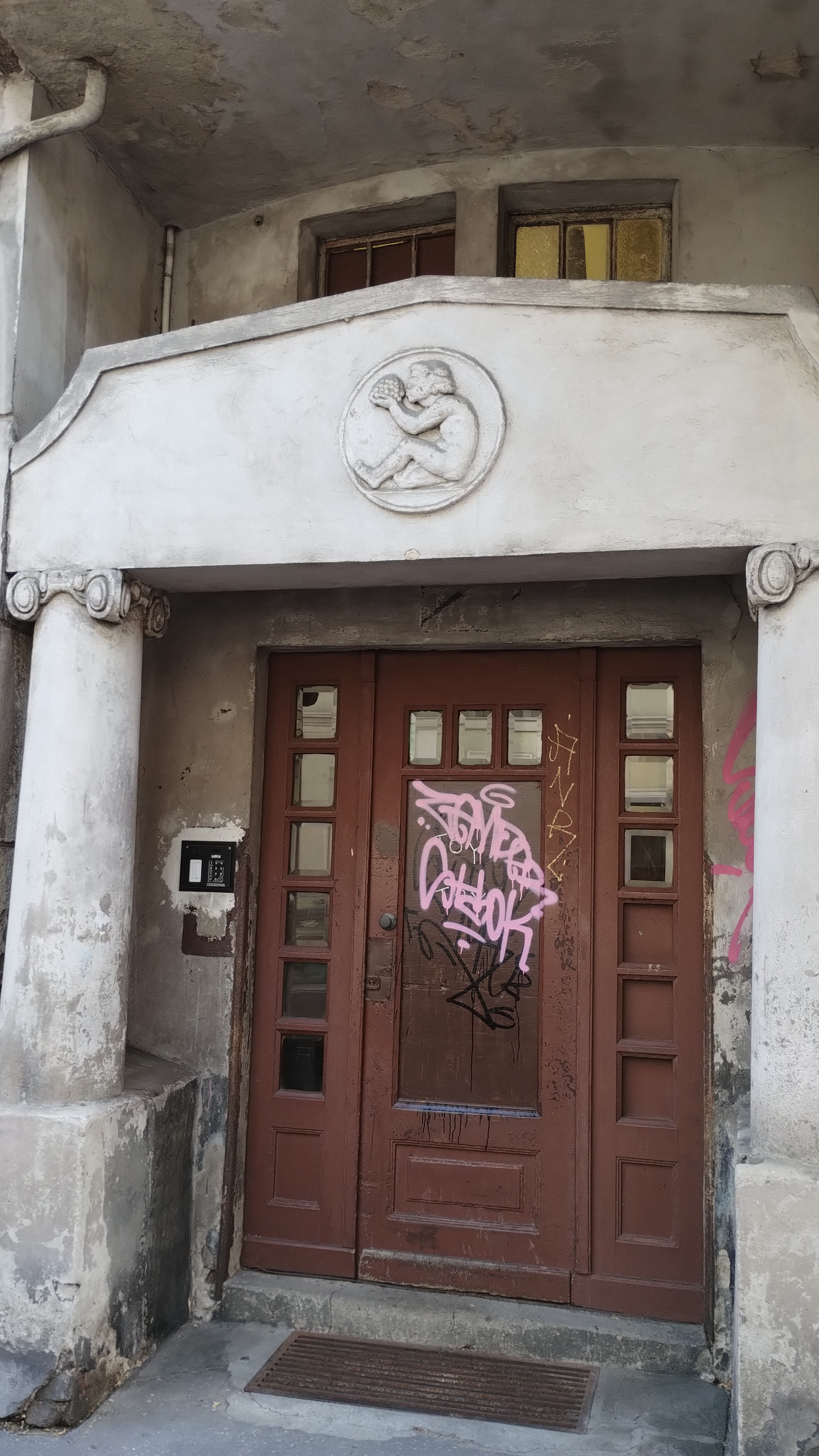
Portal and door to the street

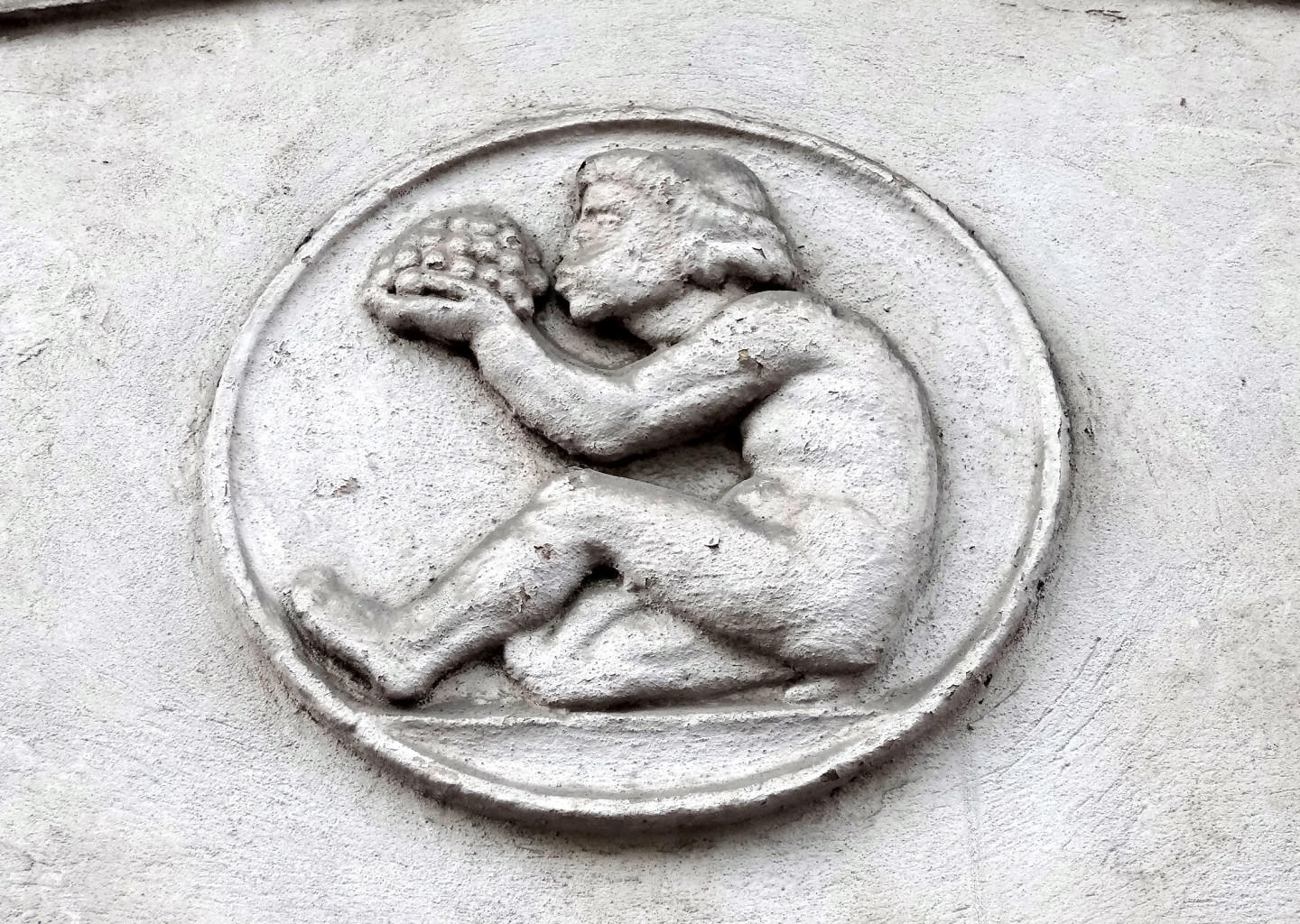
Detail of the lintel medallion

Tenement at 2, corner with 4 Śląska Street

1906

Art Nouveau

The commissioner of this tenement was a banker, Martin Friedländer, who did not live there. He was the directot of the Bank for trade and commerce (Bromberger bank für handel und gewerbe), located at 7 Wollmarkt (today's 12 Wool Market Square).

Recently overhauled (2022), there are plentiful Art Nouveau details on both facades. In particular, each entrance door is decorated with a mascaron topped by a stylish oval transom light.

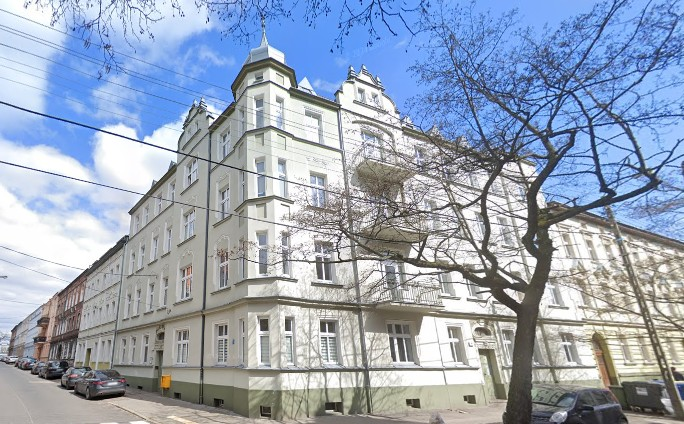
View of the corner

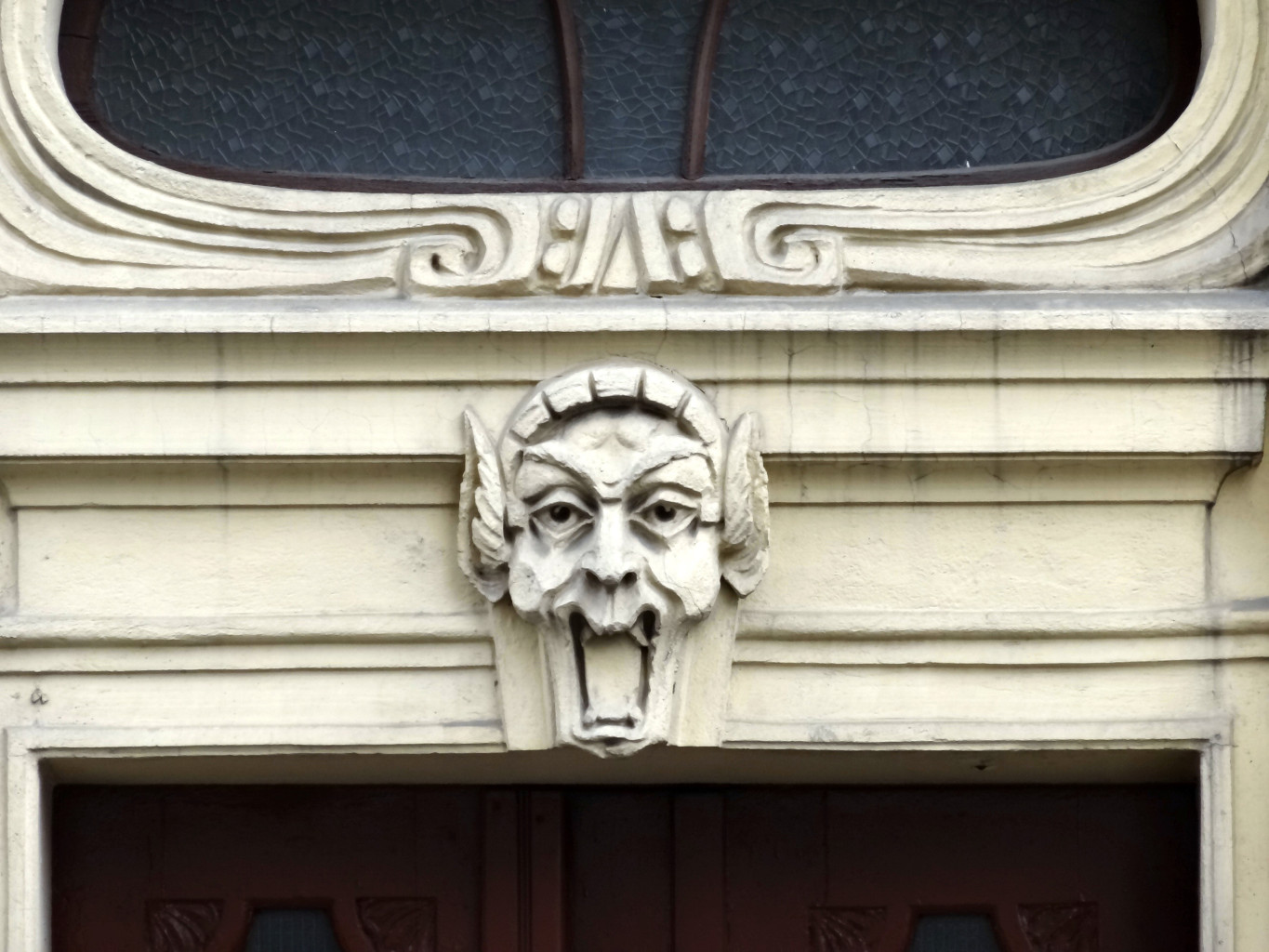
Detail of the mascaron

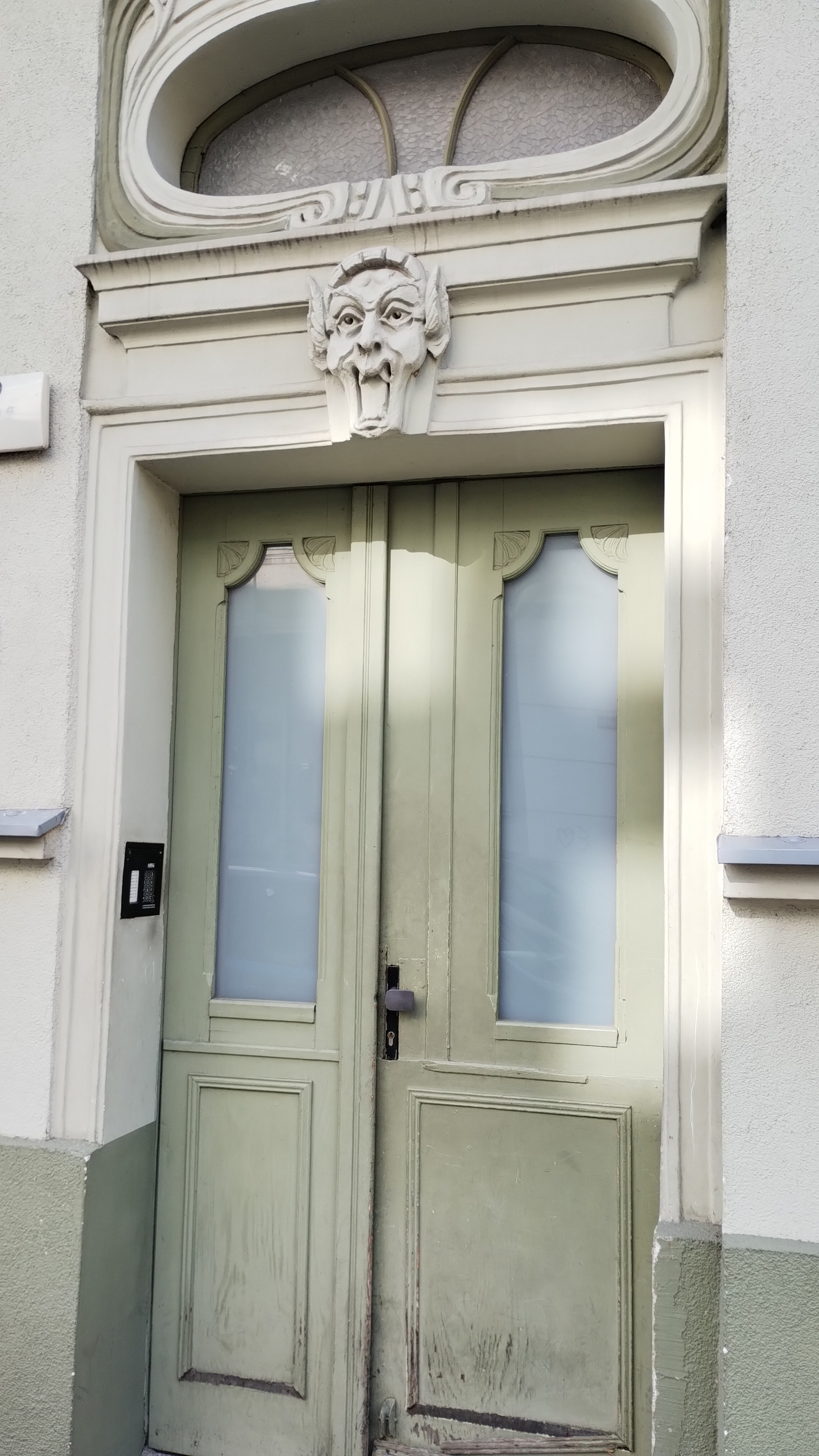
Art Nouveau door

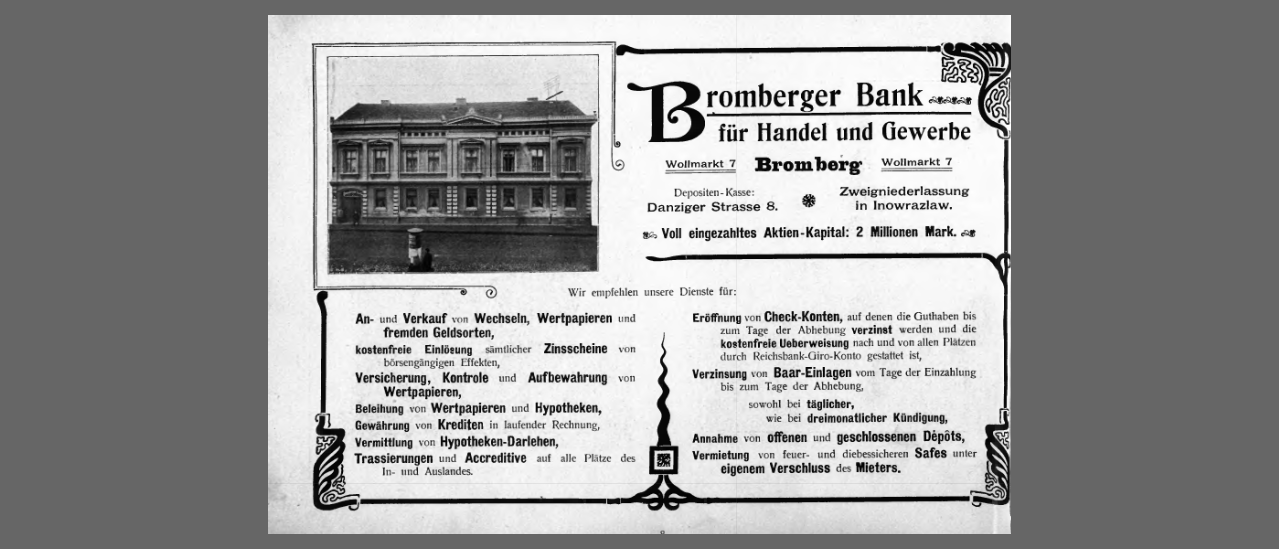
Advertising for Bromberger Bank, ca 1900

Tenement at 3

Beginning 20th century, by Bogusław Preuss

Art Nouveau

The first owner of this building (then at 12 Sophienstraße) was Anton Grabowski, a locksmith.

The edifice has been refurbished in the 2010s and presents a variety of Art Nouveau architectural details: vertical friezes, plastered cartouches on the facade, on window lintels and on balconies. Of note, the entrance door decoration include putti, flowers, garlands and a crossed keys symbol.

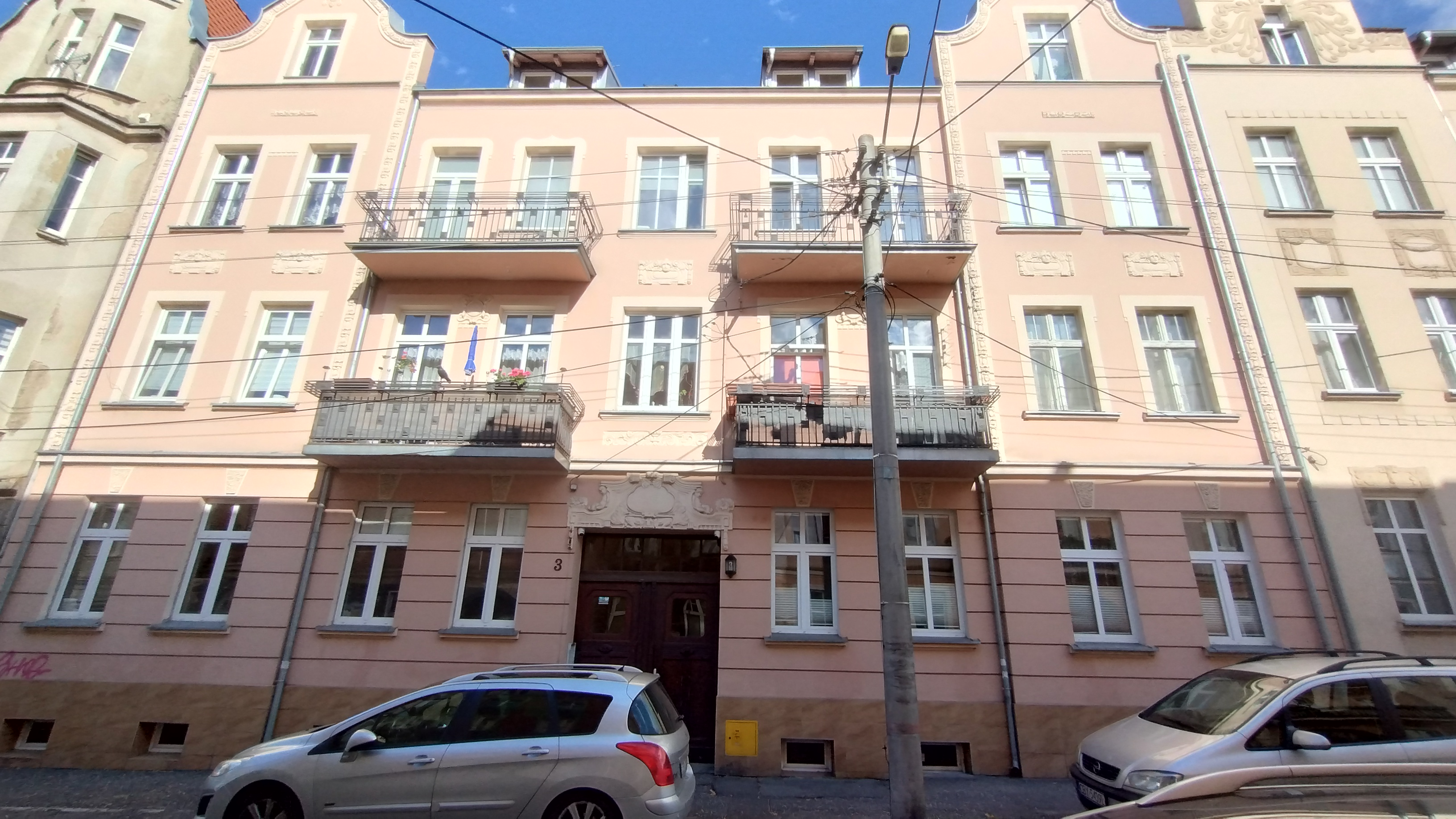
Main facade

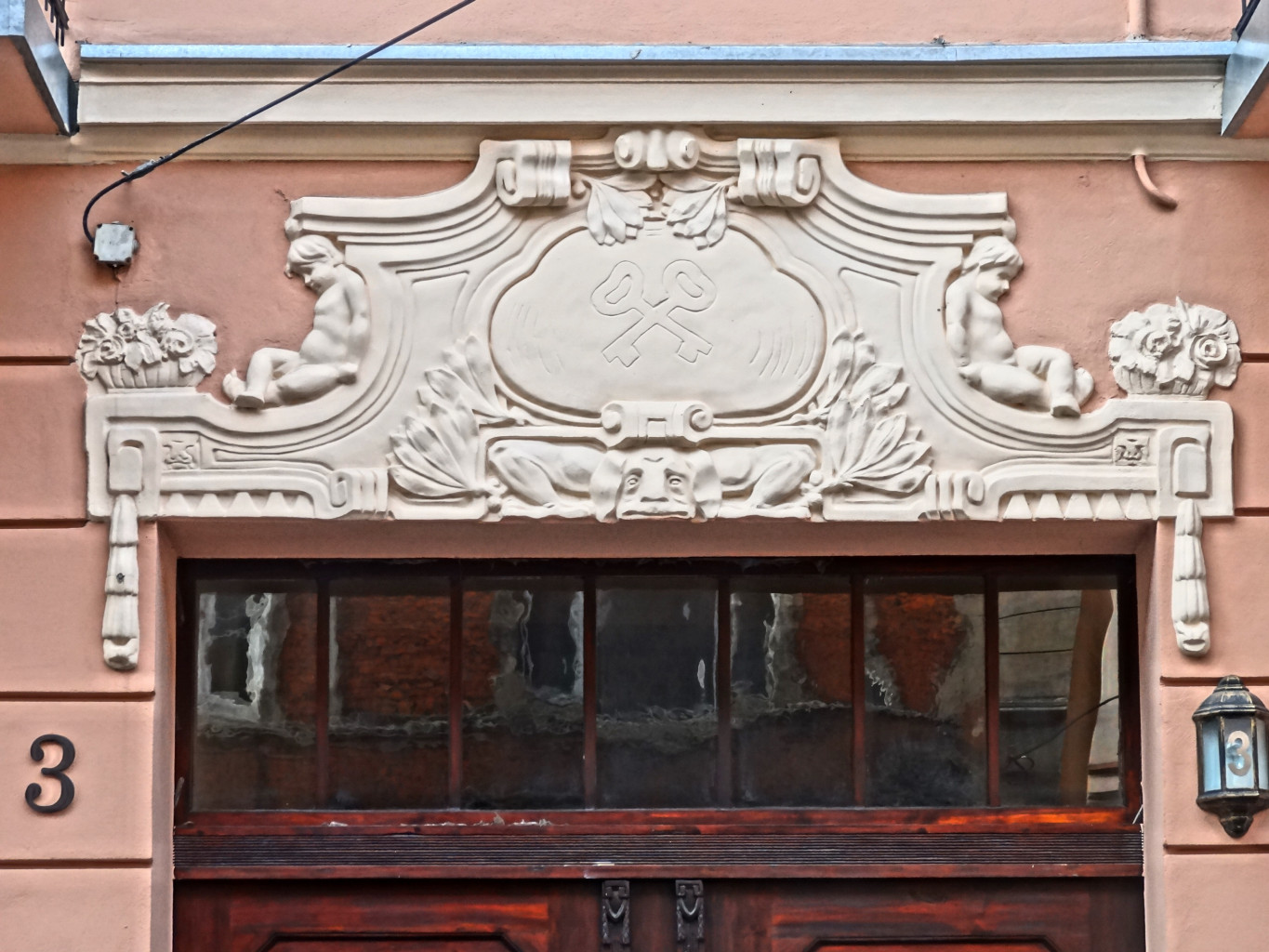
Plastered decoration

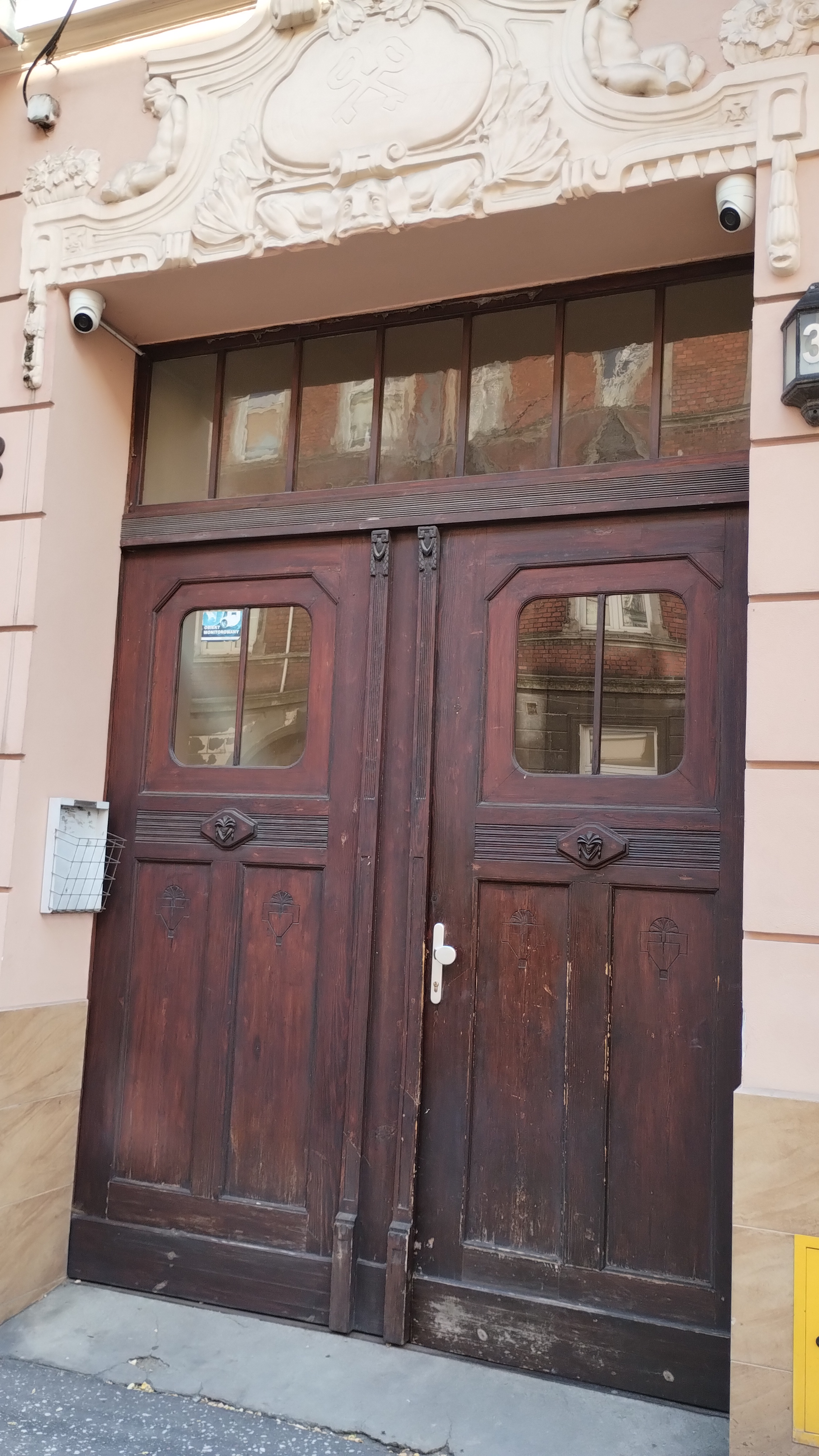
Main entrance door

Tenement at 4

1905

Eclecticism

Leopold Schmidt, a carpenter, was the first landlord of this tenement at then 8 Sophienstraße. He also possessed and lived in the abutting building at No.6.

This building is one of the few instances of eclectic architecture in the street.

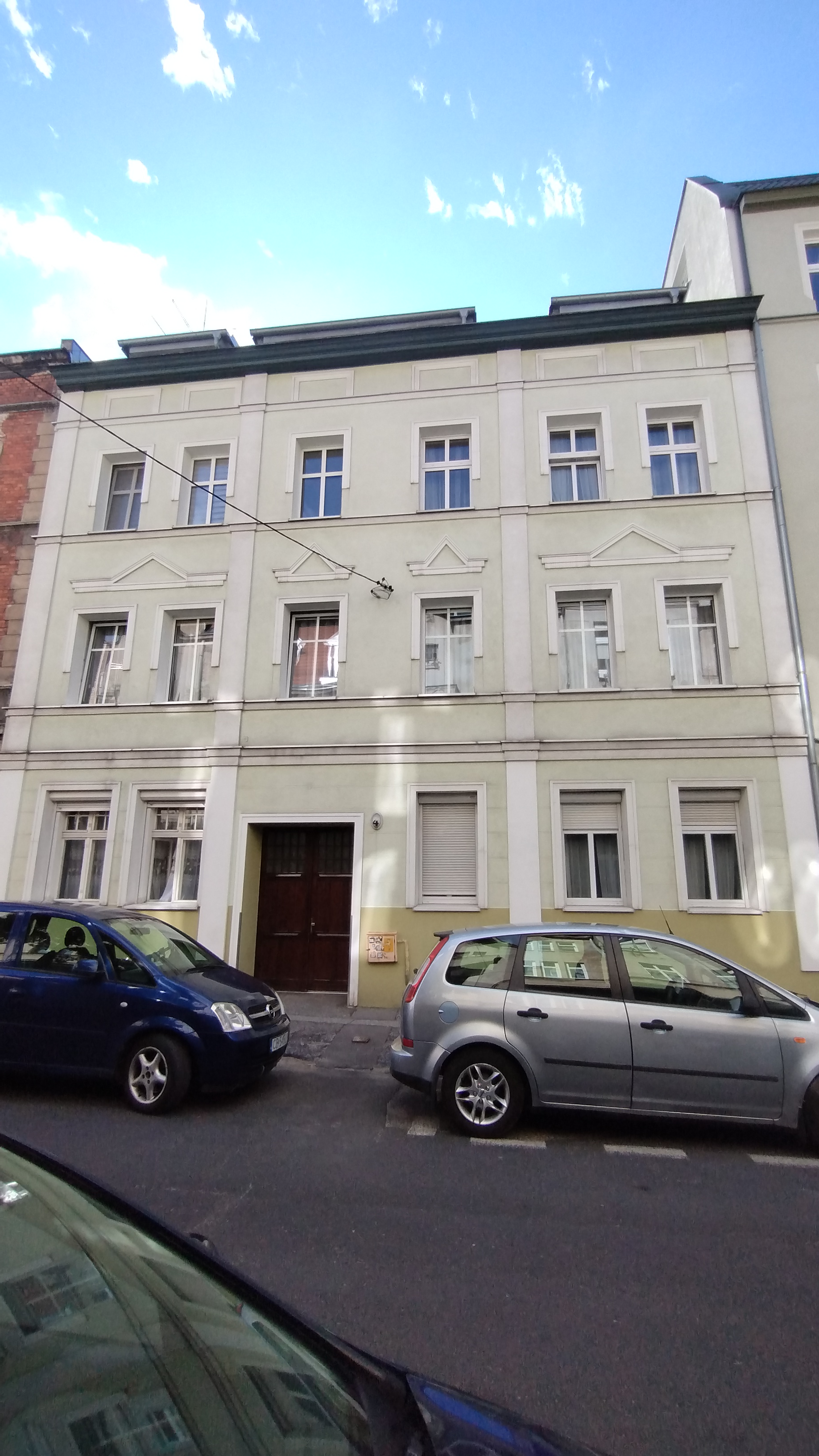
Main frontage from the street

Tenement at 5

Beginning 20th century, by Bogusław Preuss

Art Nouveau

Bogusław Preuß, a building contractor, commissioned this building, leaving his initials BP on the plastered lintel of the entrance. He lived at 24 Albertstraße (present day Garbary Street).

Renovated in 2020, the decorated facade displays Art Nouveau features on its top and around the openings. The transom light above the main street entrance is lavishly decorated.

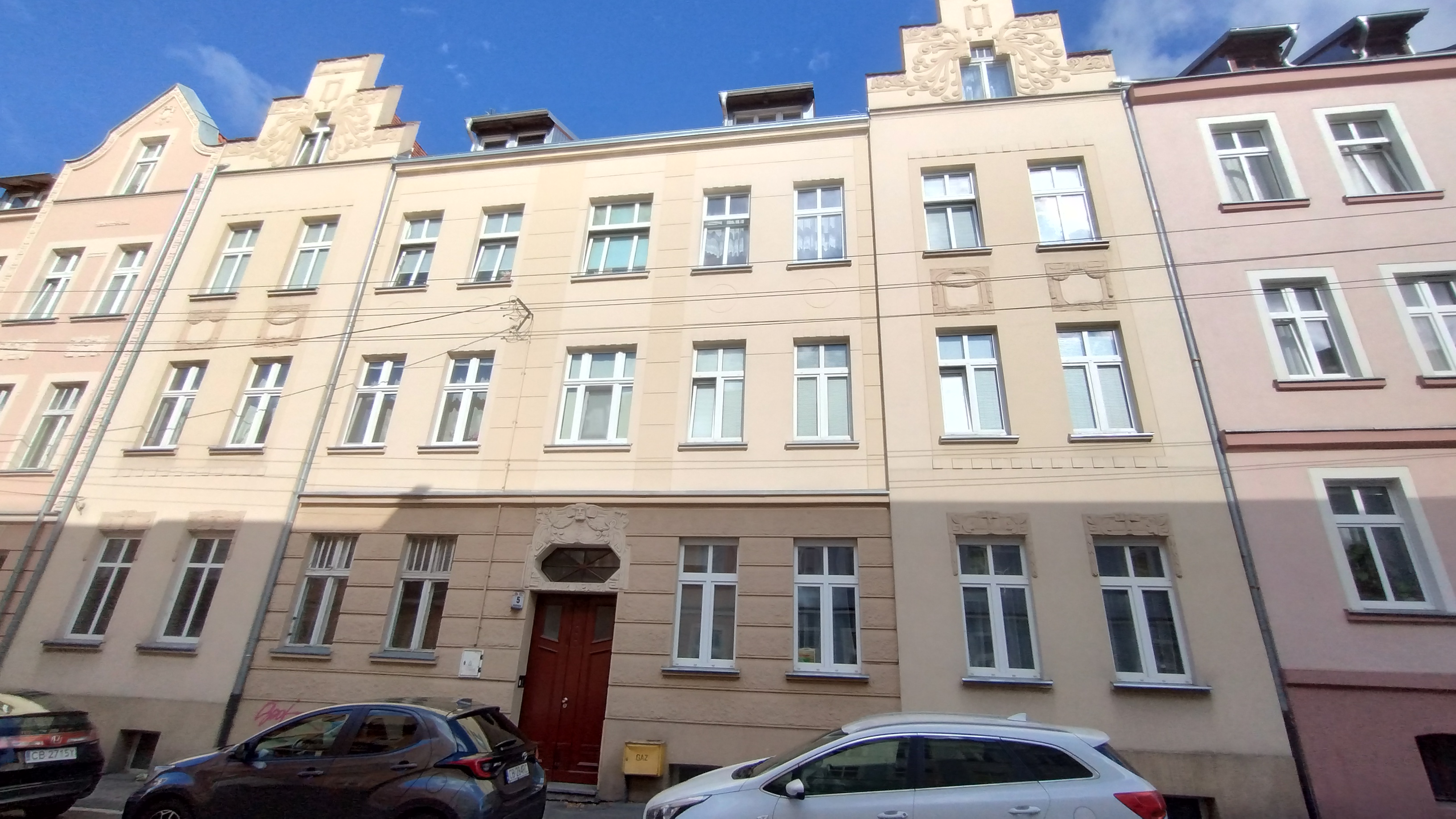
Main facade

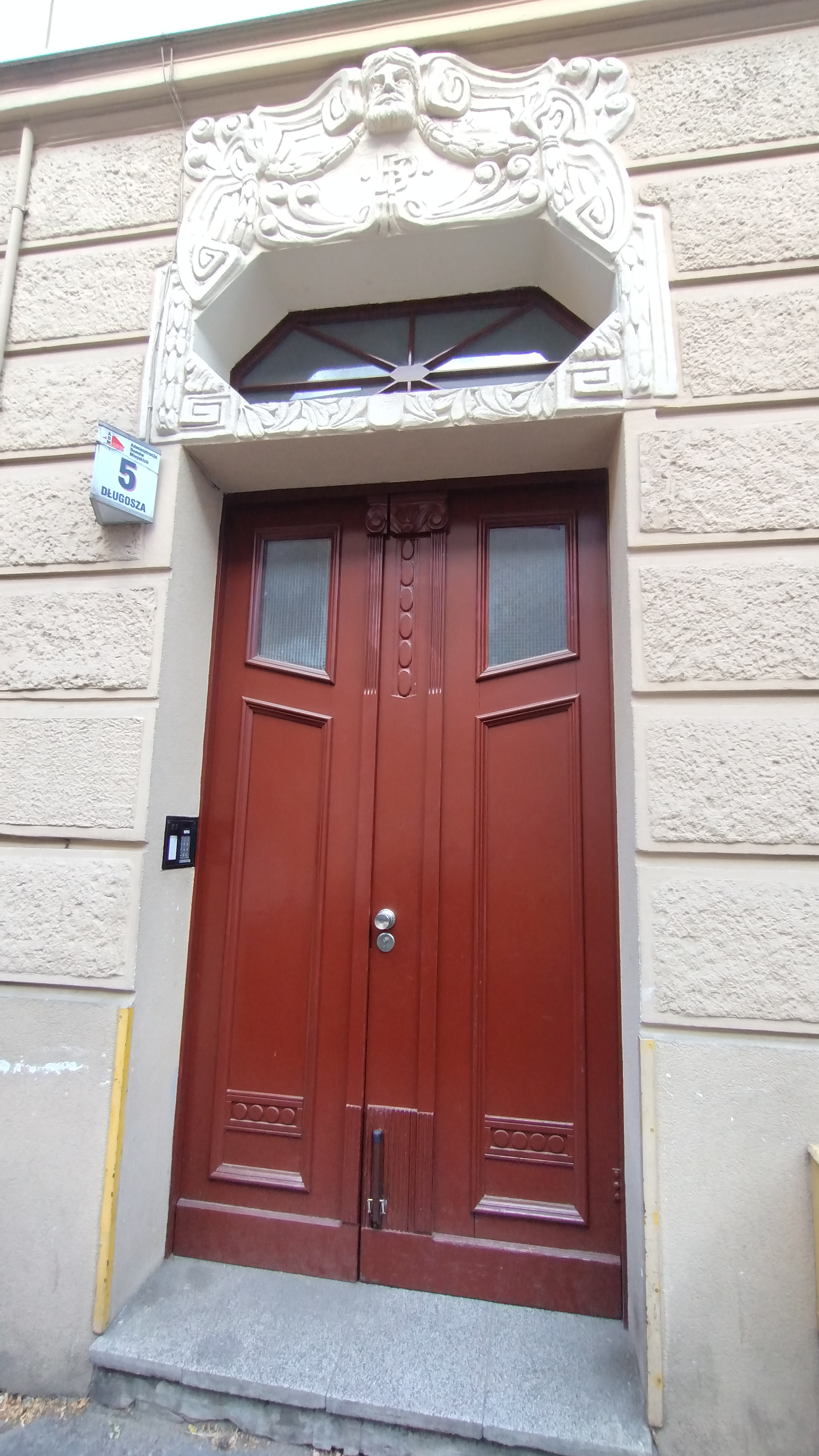
Decorated entrance door with BP initials

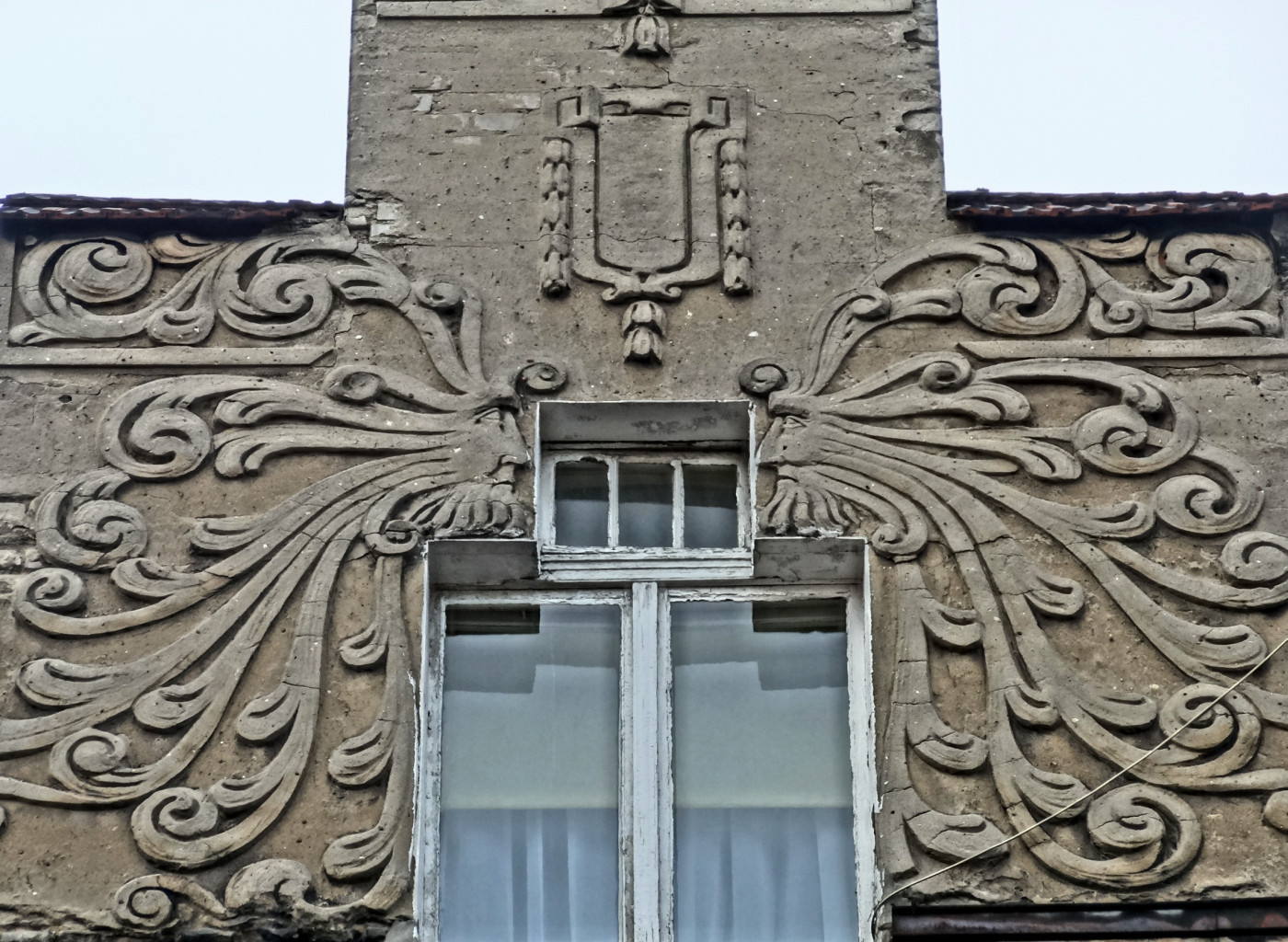
Top frontage

Eclectic edifices in Długosza street

Tenement Nr.	Year of erection	First owner	Picture	Remarks
6	1905-1907	Leopold Schmidt, a carpenter.		Leopold Schmidt also owned the building at Nr.4.
7	ca 1910	Eduard Burghardt, a train station supervisor.		The renovation carried out in 2020 underlines the plastered decorations set above the main doors, blending vegetal and animal motifs.
8	1906-1908	Alons Kobus, an installer.		The building was initially registered at 5a then 6 Sophienstraße. The tenement was renovated in 2018. In particular, one can appreciate the large wooden entrance door and the two main balconies with wrought iron railings.
9	1906-1907	Gustav Winter, a private landlord.		Very few architectural details survived on the facade.
10	1905	August Kiehl, a private landlord.		The tenement was renovated in 2018. The wooden carvings on the entrance door are worth looking.
11	1905-1907	Franz Peterson, an entrepreneur.		Julius Otto Franz was a member of the Peterson family who was influential from the beginning of the 19th century till the 1930s in the area of politics, engineering and entrepreneurship.
12	1905	Bertha König, a window, running there a guesthouse.		Remarkable plastered cartouches filled with floral motifs.
13, corner with 27 Łokietka street	1896	Ignaß Borzychowski, a painter.		The edifice has been refurbished in 2018. It now exhibits remarkable decorative details (e.g. plastered motifs in pediments, on top corbels and lintels).
14	1903	Adolf Körnig, a private landlord.		Initially recorded at 3 Sophienstraße.
16, corner with 23/25 Łokietka street	1897	Carl Juncker, a rentier.		The building is being refurbished (in June 2025) by the city authorities.

=== Siemiradzkiego street ===
Main edifices in Siemiradzkiego street

Tenement Nr.	Year of erection	First owner	Picture	Remarks
10/12 Śląska Street	1905-1910	Bank Bydgoski. In the mid-1910s, the bank also owned two other assets in the streets, at nr 2 and 4.		Renovated in 2007, both frontages exhibit late Art Nouveau details.
1/3, corner with 14 Śląska Street	1910, by Max Piechowski	Josef Raniecki, a saddler.		The building presents a narrow corner, but large frontages with early modernist features on both streets. It underwent a renovation in 2021.
2	1907-1910	Josef Raniecki, a saddler.		The entrance door presents a nice fanlight. The edifice was refurbished in 2014.
4	1907-1910	Josef Raniecki, a saddler.		Eclectic architecture, mirroring the neighbouring edifice at nr.2
5	1904-1905, by Erich Lindenburger	Josef Grabowski, a painter.		The facade boasts many Art Nouveau elements, especially in pediments and around the door portal.
6	1907	Josef Raniecki, a saddler.		One can highlight the large adorned wooden door and the two balconies with a wrought iron railing.
7	1906	Gustav Winter, a private landlord.		Building restored in 2021.
8	1908	Gustav Rodewald, a carpenter.		One of the largest frontages in the street
9	1904-1906	Paul Gehrke, a train driver.		Building restored in 2021.
10	1905-1906	Gustav Rodewald, a carpenter.		
11, corner with 31 Łokietka street	1897-1899	Carl Baumgart, a glazier.		The tenement is being refurbished (in June 2025). The facades of the wings stretching along both streets are decorated with pediments and cornices, while the ground floor is highlighted with bossage. Both individual entrances on the streets display adorned portals.
12, corner with 29 Łokietka street	1897-1898	Ignaß Borzychowski, a saddler.		A restoration had been carried out in 2007.

== See also ==
- Bydgoszcz
- Bydgoszcz Canal
- Władysława Łokietka street
- Peterson family, Bydgoszcz
- Art Nouveau
- Eclecticism in architecture
- Modern architecture

== Bibliography ==
- Umiński, Janusz (1996). Bydgoszcz. Przewodnik [Bydgoszcz. Guide] (in Polish). Bydgoszcz: Regionalny Oddział PTTK "Szlak Brdy".
