= Stefan Ciszewski =

Polish electrical engineer, beginning 20th century

- Stefan Ciszewski
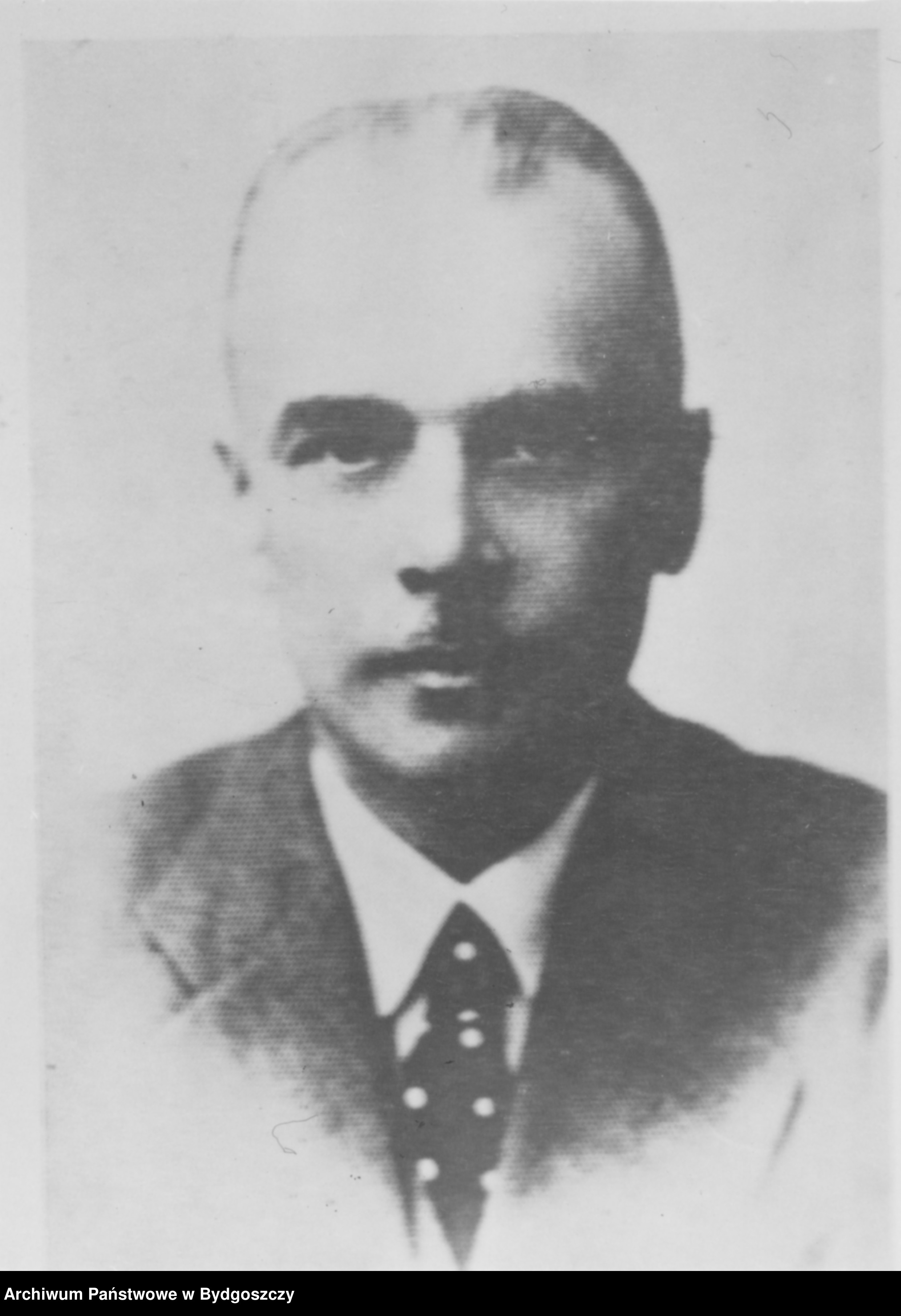
- Stefan Ciszewski
- Born: November 17, 1886; Warsaw
- Died: November 13, 1938 (aged 51); Bydgoszcz
- Resting place: Powązki Cemetery
- Citizenship: Poland
- Awards
- Engineering career
- Discipline: Electrical engineering
- Projects: Bydgoska Fabryka Artykułów Elektrotechnicznych

Stefan Ciszewski (1886-1938) was a Polish electrical engineer who pioneered national home appliance manufacturing. He was the founder in 1923 of Bydgoska Fabryka Artykułów Elektrotechnicznych (today Schneider Electric Elda S.A.), one of the oldest electrotechnical firms in Poland.

== Biography ==
=== Youth and studies ===
Stefan Ciszewski was born on 11 November 1886 in Warsaw, then in Congress Poland. His father, Aleksander Ciszewski, was an engineer and a well-known industrialist in Warsaw.

In 1905, he graduated from the secondary school in the same city. He was a talented and diligent student, as evidenced by the award he received for excellent academic results and impeccable conduct.

He studied engineering at the Technikum Mittweida, then in German Empire, followed by an internship at the Berlin branch of Allgemeine Elektrizitäts-Gesellszchaft (AEG). Ciszewski graduated in 1912, with a diploma in electrical engineering.

=== Professional activity ===
After graduation, Stefan moved to Riga, Latvia and Kharkiv, Ukraine (then both part of the Russian Empire), where he worked in different companies during the First World War. In Kharkiv, he befriended Władysław Gwiazdowski, who became later a partner in his firm.

After WWI, Poland regained independence: as a result, Stefan returned to Warsaw and in 1919, he became associated with Kazimierz Szpotański in his electrical engineering company. Both men knew each other from studiying together in Mittweida and at Berlin's branch of AEG.

Szpotański had established a few months earlier (November 1918), the Fabryka Aparatów Elektrycznych K. Szpotański i Spółka (K. Szpotański Company Electrical Apparatus Factory), producing light switches. Ciszewski was primarily interested in mass production of small plumbing equipment, which, on the other hand, did not quite fit in Szpotański's vision for his firm. After four years, Ciszewski left the Fabryka Aparatów Elektrycznych, together with his friend Władysław Gwiazdowski, to settle in Bydgoszcz.

In 1920, Kazimierz Szpotański and Stefan Ciszewski took part in the Polish-Soviet War.

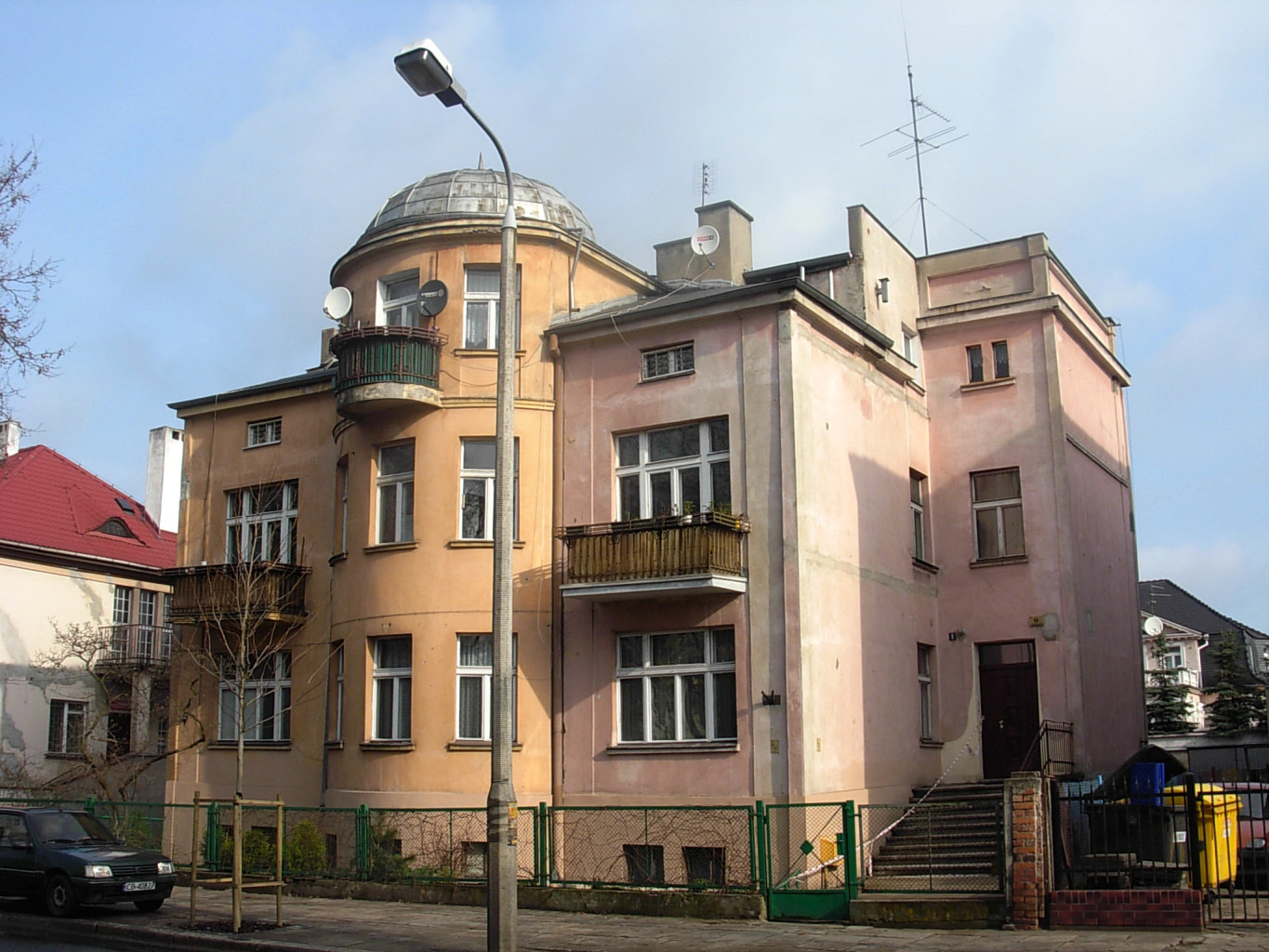
Stefan Ciszewski's villa at 9 Markwarta street

On 1 March 1923, Stefan set up his own workshop in Bydgoszcz, at 3 Świętej Trójcy Street (present day Nr.13). The small factory thrived and quickly grew into a large company, registered on 20 September 1925, under the name Fabryka Produktów Elektrotechnicznych inż. Stefan Ciszewski i S-ka, Sp. z o. o.

=== Social and private life ===
Ciszewski was one of the founders of the Bydgoszcz branch of the Association of Polish Electrical Engineers and a long-time member of the Association of Polish Technicians (Stowarzyszenie Techników Polskich), serving as chairman of the Audit Committee.

Engineer Stefan Ciszewski was an extraordinary man, a social activist in numerous institutions and associations. He belonged to the Bydgoszcz Rotary Club. He was a man of the world, knew foreign languages, and visited many European countries. Before his demise, Ciszewski was among the wealthiest residents of Bydgoszcz.

In 1936, he was nominated as a counselor of the Chamber of Commerce and Industry of Gdynia.

Stefan Ciszewski's wife was a young widow, Władysława Ustinowicz, mother of a young daughter, Hania. The family lived in a four-room apartment on the first floor at 6 Śląska Street, on the corner of Długosza Street. They moved on the mid-1930s to a villa at 9 Markwarta Street.

Stefan died after a long illness (pneumonia), on 15 November 1938, in Bydgoszcz. The funerals in the city were followed by a thousand people (officials, family and workers). The management of his company was then successively taken over by his partners Władysław Gwiazdowski and Janusz Zambrzuski till the outset of WWII.

Stefan Ciszewski was buried at the Powązki Cemetery in Warsaw, section 196-5-2, in the family vault.

== Bydgoska Fabryka Artykułów Elektrotechnicznych ==
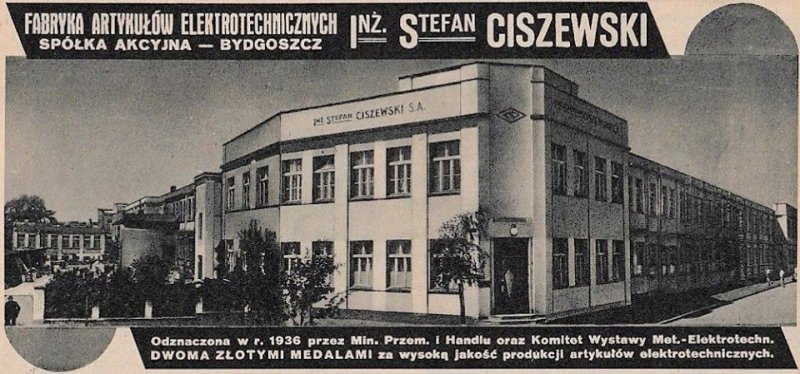
Fabrika Art Elektrotechnicznych, 1936

In the beginning, production was limited to fuses, insulating elements, lamp hangers and porcelain plugs and sockets, but before long the activity flourished, thanks to the boom associated with the fast pace of electrification of the country.

In 1937, the enterprise was transformed into a Joint-stock company, controlled by the Ciszewski family.

After WWII, the company was nationalized and in 1956, its name was changed to Eltra. In 1959, the firm produced the first Polish transistor radio (Eltra "MOT-59").

In 1997, part of the plant became in turn the property of "Tyco International" and Lexel A/S (1998). In 2003, it was set up as a joint-stock company, "Elda-Eltra Elektrotechnika", belonging to the international group Schneider Electric. It operates today as Schneider Electric Elda S.A.

== Decorations ==
Stefan Ciszewski was awarded the Polish Silver Cross of Merit on 11 November 1936.

== Commemorations ==
A street in the Fordon district of Bydgoszcz was named after Stefan Ciszewski in 1997.

A commemorative plaque to Stefan Ciszewski was unveiled in 1988, on the 65^{th} anniversary of the factory, on the wall of the Eltra building on Dworcowa Street in Bydgoszcz.

Daily newspaper Gazeta Pomorska established the Stefan Ciszewski Award in its Kuyavian–Pomeranian Voivodeship Entrepreneur annual rewards.

The Association of Polish Electrical Engineers (Stowarzyszenie Elektryków Polskich-SEP) declared Stefan Ciszewski as the Patron of the Year 2024 SEP. On this occasion, a series of lectures were on 25 October 2024, in the buildings of the Kazimierz Wielki University in Bydgoszcz.

== See also ==
- Bydgoszcz
- List of Polish people
- Eltra Bydgoszcz
- Association of Polish Electrical Engineers
- Kazimierz Szpotański

== Bibliography ==
- Gwiazdowski, Stanisław (1985). O inż. Stefanie Ciszewskim, jego fabryce i jej kierowniku Władysławie Gwiazdowskim. Kalendarz Bydgoski 1985 [About Eng. Stefan Ciszewski, his factory and its manager Władysław Gwiazdowski. Bydgoszcz calendar 1985] (in Polish). Bydgoszcz: Towarzystwo Miłośników Miasta Bydgoszczy. pp. 103–108.
- Kornet, Dorota (1996). Przemysł elektrotechniczny w Bydgoszczy w latach 1920–1939 (cz. 1). Kronika Bydgoska 18 [Electrotechnical industry in Bydgoszcz in the years 1920–1939 (part 1). Bydgoszcz Chronicles 18] (in Polish). Bydgoszcz: Towarzystwo Miłosnikow Miasta Bydgoszczy - Bydgoskie Towarzystwo Naukowe. pp. 67–97.
