= Eltra Bydgoszcz =

Electrical engineering company, 1923, Bydgoszcz, Poland

Coordinates: 53°05′27″N 18°02′42″E

Eltra
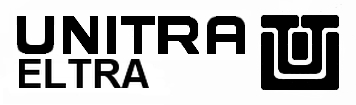
- Eltra logo

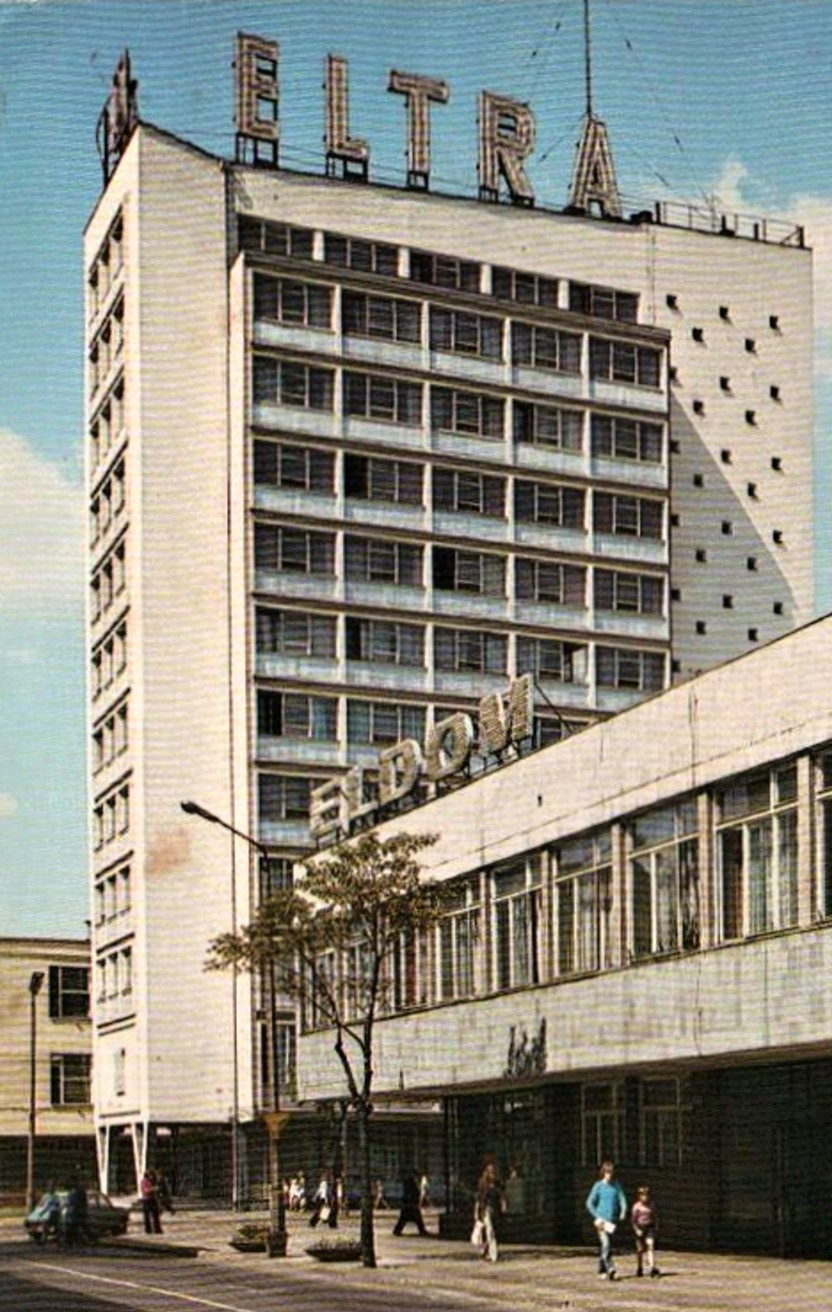
- Eltra tower, Bydgoszcz, 1971
- Company type: Firm
- Industry: Electrical engineering
- Founded: 1923 in Bydgoszcz, Poland
- Founder: Stefan Ciszewski
- Headquarters: 146 Glinki street Bydgoszcz, Poland
- Products: Electrical engineering
- Parent: Schneider Electric
- Website: www.se.com/ww/en/

Eltra is a company founded in 1923 in Bydgoszcz. It is one of the oldest electrotechnical brands in Poland. In 1959, Eltra produced the first Polish transistor radio (Eltra "MOT-59"). In 1997, part of the plant became in turn the property of "Tyco International" and Lexel A/S (1998). In 2003, it was set up as a joint-stock company, "Elda-Eltra Elektrotechnika", belonging to the international group Schneider Electric. It operates today as Schneider Electric Elda S.A.

== History ==
=== Interwar ===
The ancestor of the company "Eltra" was established on 1 March 1923 by Warsaw-born engineer Stefan Ciszewski.

Ciszewski graduated in 1905 from a realschule in Warsaw. Having studied in Mittweida, Germany, he completed his apprenticeship at the Berlin branch of AEG, from where he graduated in 1912 with a diploma in electrical engineering. After a stint in Russia, he returned to the capital of the newly independent Poland in 1919 and participated in setting up an electrotechnical company with engineer Kazimierz Szpotański. In 1923, he withdrew from the firm and moved to Bydgoszcz.

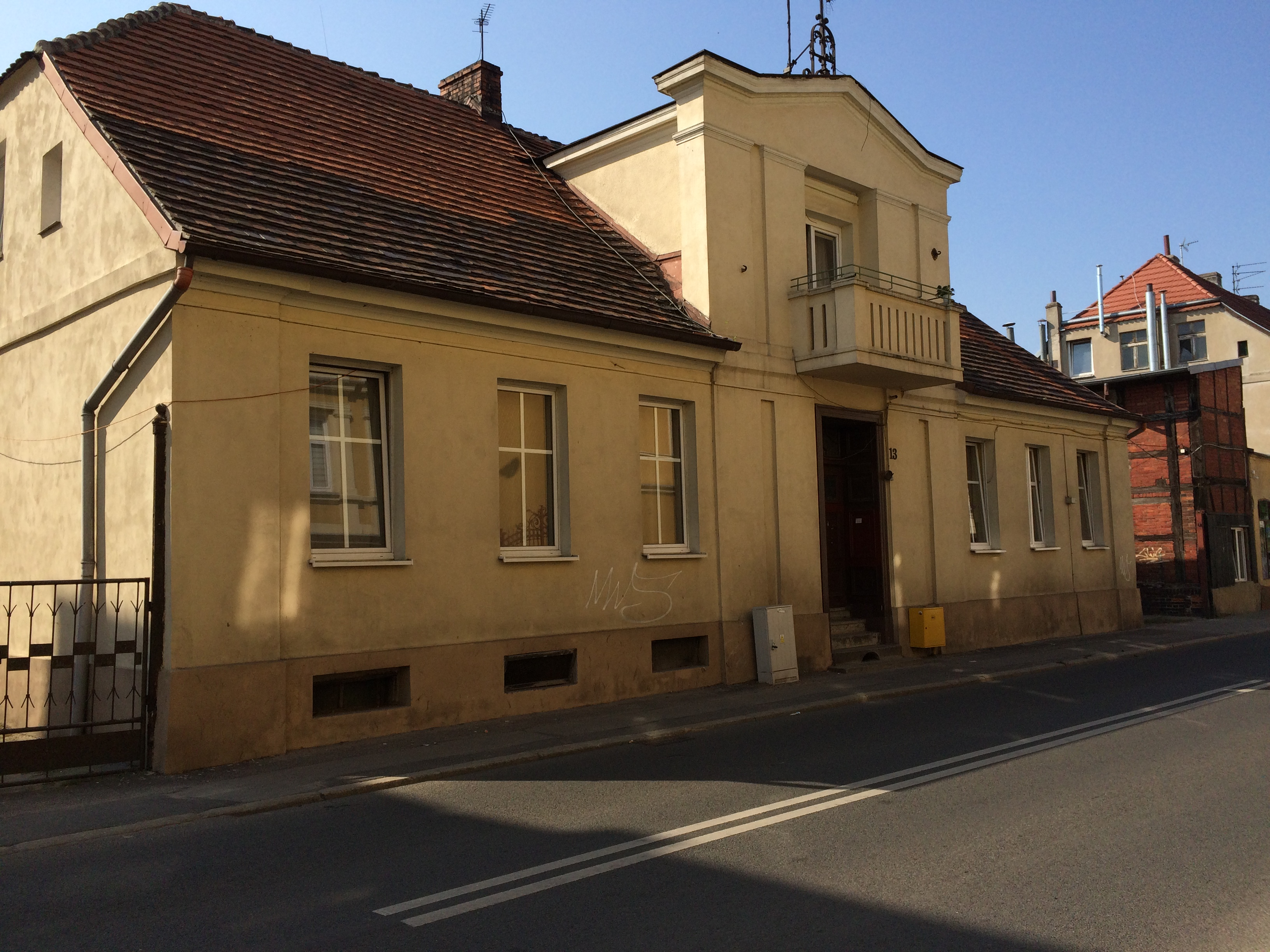
Building at today's 13 Świętej Trójcy Street

The first seat was located at the back of 3 Świętej Trójcy street. The plant occupied only 25 square metres (270 sq ft) with a few elements (a lathe, a press shop, a cleaning drum, hand presses...). Ciszewski soon employed 13 employees and the management was composed of engineers (Ciszewski, his father-in-law and Władysław Gwiazdowski).

In the beginning, production was limited to fuses, insulating elements, lamp hangers and porcelain plugs and sockets. The factory benefited from the boom associated with the fast pace of electrification of the country.

In 1925, the company significantly increased its share capital thanks to the funds brought by industrialist Mieczysław Kutnicki: on 20 September 1925, the venture was registered under the name "Fabryka Artykułów Elektrotechnicznych inż. Stefan Ciszewski i S-ka, Sp. z o. o.". A new factory was built at 1 Jana III Sobieskiego street and in 1933, began the production of thermosetting plastic mass. This year, the company sponsored the creation of a sports club, the Ciszewski Bydgoszcz (1933–1939). The latter achieved certain success in football ("Spartan Club"-Pomeranian vice-champion) and in basketball (Pomeranian champion), hence publicizing the firm.

In 1937, the enterprise was transformed into a Joint-stock company, controlled by the Ciszewski family: between 1928 and 1939, the workforce increased from 139 to 526 people.

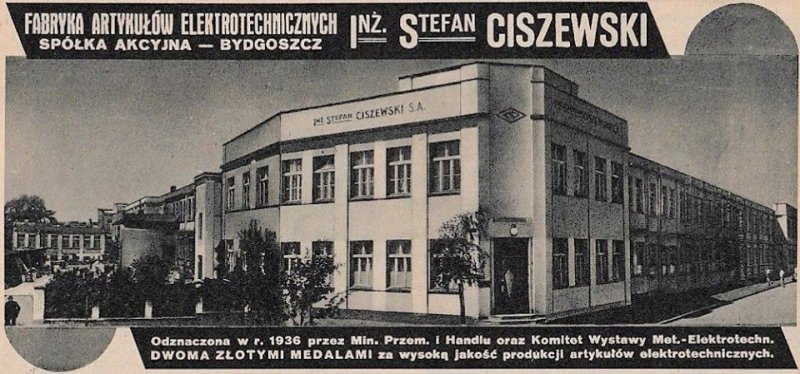
Advertising for Fabryka Artykułów Elektrotechnicznych inż. Stefan Ciszewski, 1936

The production was based on the designs made by Stefan Ciszewski, who in parallel applied for many patents. The firm catalogue comprised 1,220 electrotechnical devices for low and high voltage. To meet the growing demand, the "Fabryka Artykułów Elektrotechnicznych" worked three shifts and had opened offices in seven major Polish cities. In 1939, the establishment of a new branch in Zamość, in the Central Industrial Region, had even began.

The company generated profits throughout the entire interwar period, even during the Great Depression when extensive investments were realized in expanding and modernizing the factory. Furthermore, the enterprise had a remarkable social policy, caring for employees, sanitary and working conditions.

At the death of Stefan Ciszewski, on 15 November 1938, in his villa at 9 Markwarta Street, the management of the "Fabryka Artykułów Elektrotechnicznych" was successively taken over by Władysław Gwiazdowski (until 31 March 1939) and Janusz Zambrzuski.

Ciszewski's plant demonstrated its know-how at the Poznań International Fair and Leipzig Trade Fair. It received gold medals of recognition for its products during the following exhibitions:

- in Lviv (1926), Vilnius (1928) and Warsaw (1936);
- in Paris (1937).

The company was famous for its high-quality production and its lavish illustrated catalogs. Domestically, "Fabryka Artykułów Elektrotechnicznych" controlled 80% of the installation equipment market. Abroad, its main customers were large groups, such as Siemens, AEG or Brown Boveri. In the interwar period, the factory was one of the largest enterprises in the electrotechnical industry in Poland, together with the "Bracia Borkowscy Zakłady Elektrotechniczne S.A." plant in Warsaw and the "Spółka Akcyjna Przemysłu Elektrotechnicznego" in Czechowice-Dziedzice.

=== German Occupation ===
In autumn 1939, the company was taken over by Germany forces.

At that time, the daughter and the son-in-law of factory founder Stefan Ciszewski were both shot during the "Tryszczyn Crimes", a series of mass executions carried out by the Germans at the turn of September and October 1939.

In spring 1940, Erhardt Schmidt, an industrialist from Gdańsk, was appointed as the company trustee and bought it in 1941. In addition to the regular production of electrotechnical items, specific articles were manufactured for the benefit of the Wehrmacht (e.g. fuzes, shrapnels) and the Luftwaffe (radio stations) in the local workshop of MAKRUM. The increase of activity due to the war production resulted in additional machinery and a growing workforce, from 200 (1939) to 767 employees (1944). In the final months of the conflict, the factory employed up to 1200 people, as it was augmented by prisoners from jails in Koronowo (1941) and Sztum (1943); most of them were Poles, while managerial positions were occupied by Germans.

On 20 January 1945 Edmund Biechowski, a plant worker, removed the explosives aimed at blowing up the facility as Nazis forces were retreating.

=== PRL Period (1946–1989) ===
On 8 April 1945 the personnel of the factory was ordered by Soviet military authorities to leave the plant. The Red Army began dismantling and transporting the factory equipment to the USSR. By 16 April, 140 boxes with machines and 13 with other equipment were transported to an electrical factory in Leningrad. This move was compensated in spring 1946, by the delivering of devices from the company Schortmann in Leipzig.

The ex-"Fabryka" was then nationalized and subordinated to the "Central Management of Electrical Machines and Apparatus Industry" (Polish: Centralny Zarząd Przemysłu Maszyn i Aparatów Elektrycznych) and from 1952 to the "Central Management of Precision Products" (Polish: Centralny Zarząd Wyrobów Precyzyjnych). Until 1950, the factory grew with branches opening in Nakło nad Notecią, Toruń and Poniatowa: these new plants took over part of the production in Bydgoszcz. Eventually, Nakło's facility, employing about 300 people, became independent in 1956, receiving the naming "Zakłady Wytwarzanie Sprzętu Instalacyjny w Nakło" (English: Production Plant of Installation Equipment in Nakło). Likewise, in 1970, the "Zakłady Podzespołów Radiowych-Porad" established in 1957 in Gniew, took over the manufacture of some contact components from the Bydgoszcz site.

In 1948, a standardization body was established at the factory so as to normalize the products and distribute their manufacturing rationally between the different plants. Additionally, another office was set up in Bydgoszcz in 1949, "Zakłady Wytwarzanie Sprzętu Instalacyjny", which role was to oversee all sites in the country producing electrotechnical equipment.

Under the guidance of the Six-Year Plan (1950–1956), the Bydgoszcz site was expanded (1952) and staffing increased to 1,240 employees.

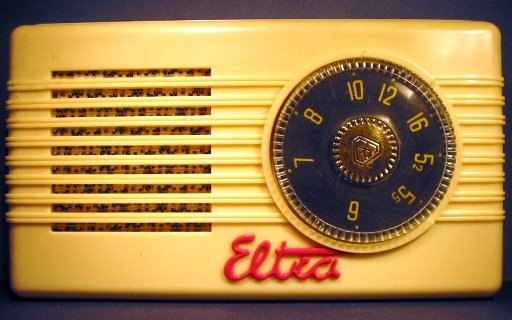
Eltra "MOT-59" radio receiver

In 1956, by the decision of the Council of Ministers, the factory was subordinated to the Unitra (Union of Electronic and Teletechnical Industry), which triggered the production of contact components for the electronics industry. This change led the Bydgoszcz plant to be renamed Eltra.

Eltra pioneered in 1959 the development and production of the first Polish miniature transistor receiver, the Eltra MOT-59 (MOT stands for "Miniaturowy Odbiornik Tranzystorowy" or "Miniature Transistor Receiver"), thanks to a team of engineers led by Roman Paluchowski. Considering the absence of cooperation with the Western countries, the success of this project in a plant without any tradition in the domain can be considered as a great achievement for the time.

After this breakthrough, manufacturing portable receivers took a growing importance in the total output of Eltra, but it never replaced the production of basic electronic components. Furthermore, the lack of qualified operators able to master the production of components for radio receivers forced the direction to diversify its capacities by launching new processing lines (plastics, phototechnical scale items...).

The second model of a transistor radio produced was the Koliber MOT-601, in 1961. Soon (1965–1968), new and upgraded portable radios were designed (e.g. Tramp, Minor, Sylwia, Ara, Kamila). In 1969, three-band receiver models were available (Dominika and Izabella), as previous radios could only receive two bands, low frequency and medium wave, and a year later the Laura 4-band receiver came into production.

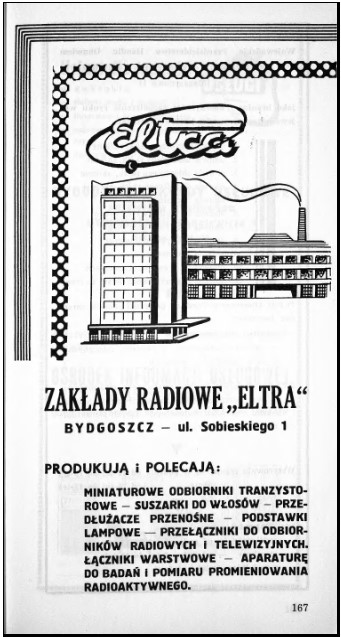
Eltra advertising, 1968

In 1960, Eltra started to assemble TV sets (Szmaragd 902) from parts delivered by the "Warszawskie Zakłady Telewizyjne" (English: Warsaw Television Works). In the 1960s, the production halls were enlarged and in 1964, an 11-storey office building was opened at 81 Dworcowa Street, in downtown Bydgoszcz. The production technology was gradually enriched with new design solutions, such as printed circuit boards, even though the inefficiency of the centrally planned economy undermined the implementation of any new process.

In 1968, the millionth radio model was produced and licenses were purchased from the French company "Isostat" for two-way switches and keyboards, which later became Eltra's main exports. In the early 1970s, 400,000 radios receivers were produced every year: it represented 60% of the entire production of the plant. Transistors were imported from abroad, first provided by Telefunken and later by Philips.

Eltra practically monopolized the production of contact elements on the Polish market. In 1971, a plant in Białogard, previously subordinated to the Warsaw firm "Rawar", was incorporated into the company. In 1973, Eltra took control of the "Bydgoszcz Department of Musical Instruments" which had also a branch in Chojnice.

In 1971–1976, in addition to the 12 new types of radio receivers into production, electronic calculators entered also serial manufacturing. At that time, Eltra was one of the few Polish companies that used a design artist to create radio models, giving to the Eltra products a unique and individual style. In 1980, after many years experiments, the first stereo radio cassette player ("Klaudia RMS-801") and electric organ were manufactured.

In 1975, Eltra employed about 1,500 people in Bydgoszcz and 5,000 people in total, most of whom were female. The company had a strong social policy for the personnel, with its own dentist office and a clinic covering various areas (gynecology, rheumatology, gastroenterology). Moreover, Eltra's workers could use the services of a nursery and a kindergarten and enjoy several holiday resorts in the country (Mielno, Sosnówka, Sianożęty, Więcbork and Orzechowo).

In 1978, the split of Unitra into two distinct bodies made Eltra part of the "Unitra-Dom" (Union of the Electronic Industry). In the re-structuring, it lost its plants in Gniew and Białogard, which joined the enterprise "Unitech" (Union of Electronic Components and Materials Industry). From 1979 to 1983, Eltra also disengaged from its site in Rzeszów, producing popular portable radios.

While the products were easily sold in the Polish shortage economy-plagued market, export was only carried out in the second half of the 1970s. The "Unitra-Eltra" export best sellers Radio in the 1980s were:

- stereo radio cassette player "Manuela RMS-806";
- compact stereo "Eltra CS 201";
- electronic organ "Estrada-207 AR";
- electronic piano "Estrada-108 P".

Eltra models were exported to Austria, Yugoslavia, France, Italy, West Germany, Netherlands, Spain, Sweden, but electrical components only to the Soviet Union and East Germany. In 1988, in the framework of the nationwide program of digitalization of the Polish economy, Eltra saw its Bydgoszcz site at Glinka street expanded.

As a consequence of its monopoly on the domestic market, Eltra and its products were treated as a norm in Poland: as an example, its connectors and sockets were used in the "Elwro 800 Junior", the first mass-distributed school computer in the country.

=== Recent period (since 1989) ===
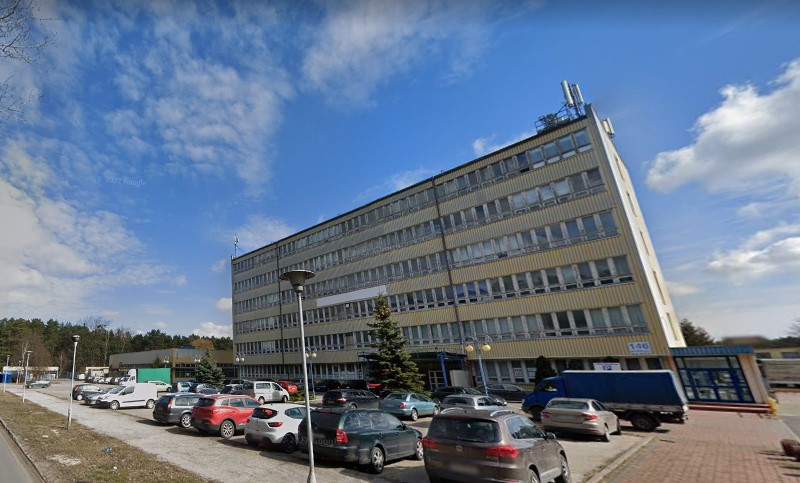
Production site at 146 Glinki street

In 1991, Eltra state-owned status was transformed into firm proprietorship. Since 1995, due to the hyper competition on imported electronic equipment, Eltra had focused its production on electrical installation equipment (which made up more than 50% of its total output in 1998) and telecommunications.

Simultaneously, connectors and tools manufacturing was transferred to "El-Con" and "El-Form", two subsidiaries which in 1997 were purchased by AMP Inc., later (1999) part of Tyco International (re-branded in 2007 Tyco Electronics).

In Bydgoszcz, unused production halls in Glinki district were sold to "Bydgoskie Fabryki Mebli". In 1997, Eltra company obtained an ISO 9001 quality management system certificate and in 2000, an ISO 14001 environmental management system certificate.

In 1998, the company was acquired by the Scandinavian capital group "Lexel A/S" belonging to Schneider Electric. In 2003, Eltra merged with another Polish unit belonging to Schneider Electric, "Zakłady Elda", in Szczecinek. Since 2022, Eltra operates under the name Schneider Electric Elda S.A. and has a significant position on the domestic market of electrical installation equipment. The plant in Bydgoszcz produces electrical installation equipment and accessories for buildings, as well as building control and communication systems.

=== Production sites in Bydgoszcz ===
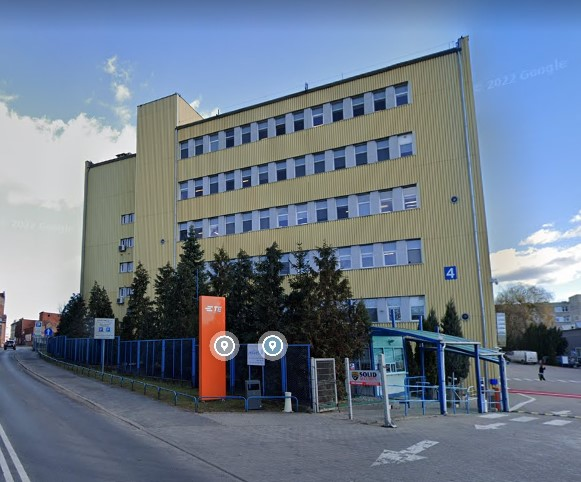
"TE Connectivity" plant at 4 Unii Lubelskiej street

- First workshop at 3 Świętej Trójcy street (present day Nr.13)

The building dates back to 1910, it has been built for Agnes Wiechert, the wife of a veterinary surgeon, living in the same street. On 1 March 1923 Stefan Ciszewski set up there its first workshop. In 1992, a commemorative plaque was unveiled near the porch, recalling a World War II clandestine cell codenamed "3x3", led by Lieutenant Colonel and intelligence officer Józef Gruss, which operated in the edifice.

- Site at 4 Unii Lubelskiej street

The site comprised subsidiaries from Eltra, which have been acquired by "Tyco Electronics".

On 10 March 2011 "Tyco Electronics Ltd" changed its name to "TE Connectivity Ltd", more relevant to its position as a connectivity and sensor component manufacturer.

The factory is specialized in the production of connectors, resistors, relays and other electrical engineering devices. It cooperates with groups such as Siemens, Grundfos and Ericsson. The plant employs approximately 1,300 people.

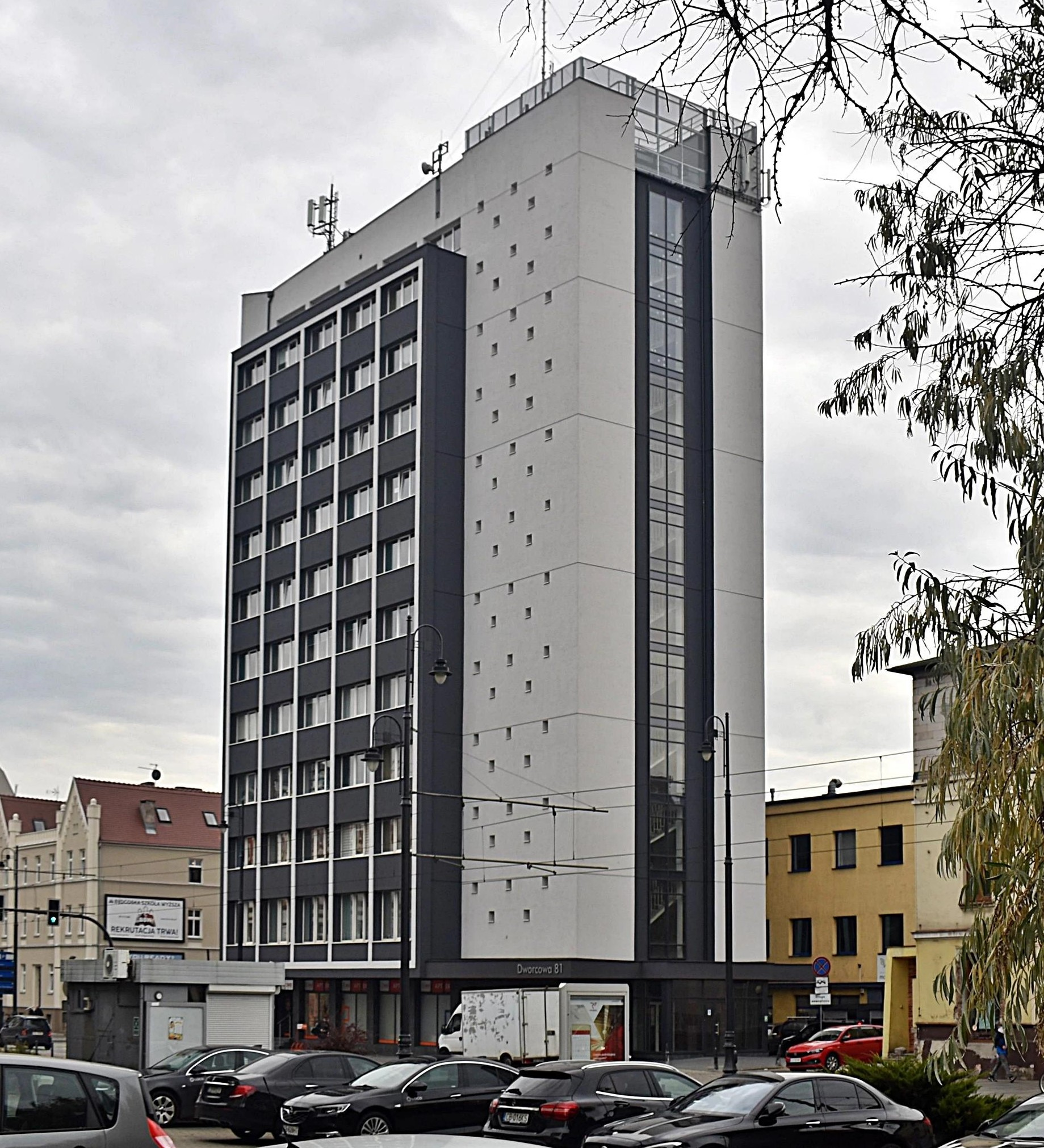
Ancient "Eltra Tower", after renovation

In September 2022, "TE Connectivity" moved and expanded an injection molding branch in Bydgoszcz, from Unii Lubelskiej street to Krzywca Street, on the former Zachem area. The Bydgoszcz sites developed the production of a wide range of connectors for the electronic industry and cabling systems for the telecommunications industry.

- Former "Eltra" Tower, at 81 Dworcowa Street

The 11-floor skyscraper has been erected in 1963 to house Eltra offices. It still is the tallest building (49.5 metres (162 ft)) on the street. In the 1990s, it has been home to different companies.

In 2018, a thorough renovation project of the building has been carried out by the company "Locum". The new facade design and the refurbishing of the main entrance has been realized by the Architectural Design Studio "Archigeum".

- Site at 146 Glinki street

In this factory were produced, among others, popular laser CD players and electronic organs at a rate of 5000 models each year in the late 1980s. As the site expanded, it took over in 1972 the buildings of the nearby former "Accordion Factory in Bydgoszcz" (Polish: Bydgoska Fabryka Akordeonów (BFA)).

== Brand Development ==
The company has undergone various iterations of its brand name, as follows:

- 1923-1925 – "Fabryka Aparatów Elektrycznych inż. Stefan Ciszewski"
- 1925-1939 – "Fabryka Artykułów Elektrotechnicznych inż. S. Ciszewski i S-ka, Sp. z.o.o."
- 1939-1941 – "Fabrik für Elektrotechnische Erzeugnisse Erhard Schmidt"
- 1941–1945 – "Erhard Schmidt Fabrik für Elektrotechnische Erzeugnisse" - English: Erhard Schmidt factory for electrical products
- 1945 – "Fabryka Artykułów Elektrotechnicznych S. Ciszewski S.A. pod zarządem państwowym"
- 1945-1948 – "Bydgoska Fabryka Artykułów Elektrotechnicznych"
- 1948-1957 – "Zakłady Wytwórcze Sprzętu Instalacyjnego przedsiębiorstwo państwowe wyodrębnione (zakład A-4 w Bydgoszczy)" - English: Manufacturing Plants of Installation Equipment, a state-owned separate enterprise
- 1957-1966 – "Zakłady Wyrobów Elektrotechnicznych Eltra w Bydgoszczy" - English: Eltra Electrotechnical Products Plant in Bydgoszcz
- 1966-1971 – "Zakłady Radiowe Eltra w Bydgoszczy" English: Eltra Radio Workshop in Bydgoszcz
- 1971-1982 – "Zakłady Radiowe Unitra-Eltra w Bydgoszczy"
- 1982-1991 – "Zakłady Radiowe Eltra w Bydgoszczy"
- 1991-2003 – "Eltra S.A."
- 2003 – 2022 Elda-Eltra Elektrotechnika S.A.

On 23 June 2022 the ordinary general meeting of Shareholders of "Elda-Eltra Elektrotechnika S.A." in Bydgoszcz adopted a resolution to change the company name of the company as follows: Schneider Electric Elda S.A..

== Historical products ==
Since the late 1950s, Eltra has had a dominant position on the Polish market of electrical contact elements such as switches, connectors and lamp sockets.

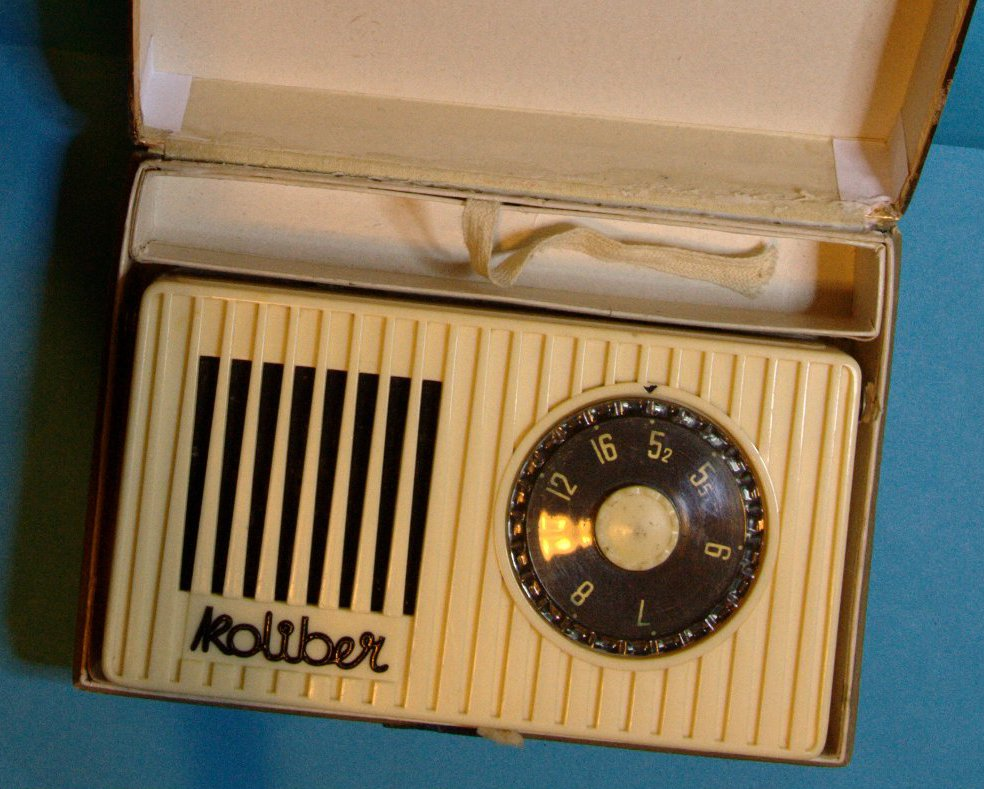
"Koliber" model

In the 1960s, company best seller products became transistor radio receivers. One of the most famous was the Koliber model. In 1969, three-band receiver models were available (Dominika and Izabella), as previous radios could only receive two bands, low frequency and medium wave, and a year later the Laura 4-band receiver came into production. At that time, Eltra proposed the model Jacek, sold in parts to be customer-assembled.

In the mid-1970s, the production of the first portable stereo radio started. In total, several dozen models of portable radio receivers have been manufactured by Eltra, starting from the cheap and basic ones (Sylwia, Kama), to luxurious items (Julia Stereo) and radio tuners for shelf stereos Unitra, via popular models (Mariola, Jowita).

In the 1980s, radio tape recorders (portable and stationary) came into production (e.g. Edyta 2 RMS-823, Klaudia RMS-801, Marta RM 405). In 1989, productions of stereo units with noise reduction system began.

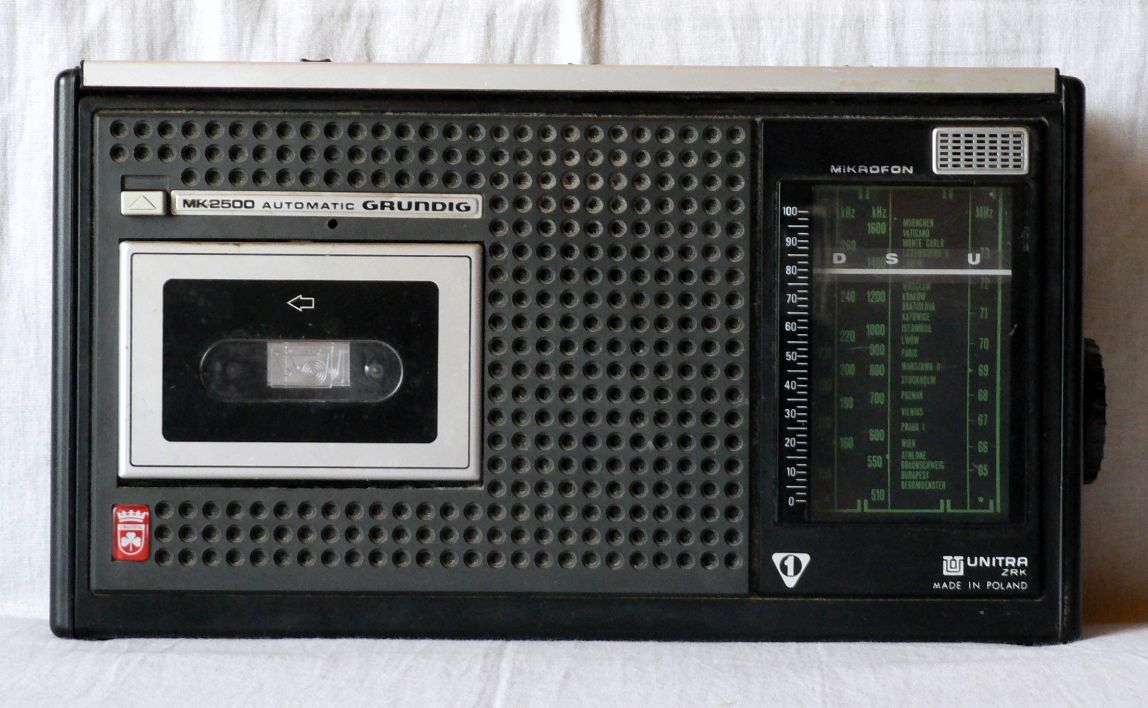
Unitra "ZRK"-Grundig "MK2500"

The 1970s popular radio tape recorder Grundig MK 2500 had also been produced in Bydgoszcz under license as Unitra ZRK.

The company produced as well:

- electronic calculators (Brda) (1976–1985);
- sound and concert equipment, stage loudspeakers and high-power amplifierss (Eltron, Contra, Gran);
- electronic musical keyboards.

In addition to civilian line of productions, Eltra managed special manufacturing orders for the army (e.g. teletechnical connectors).

== See also ==
- Bydgoszcz
- Stefan Ciszewski
- Schneider Electric
- TE Connectivity

== Bibliography ==
- Hutnik, Mieczysław; Pachniewicz, Tadeusz (1994). Zarys historii polskiego przemysłu elektronicznego do 1985 r., SEP, Zeszyt Historyczny nr 2 [An outline of the history of the Polish electronics industry until 1985, SEP, Historical Journal No. 2.] (in Polish). Warszawa: N-T.
- Stowarzyszenie Elektryków Polskich, Historia Elektryki Polskiej, Tom III Elektronika i Telekomunikacja [Association of Polish Electrical Engineers, History of Polish Electrical Engineering, Volume III Electronics and Telecommunications.] (in Polish). Warszawa: N-T. 1974.
