= Bydgoszcz Furniture Factory =

Furniture company, Bydgoszcz, 19th, 20th and 21st century

Coordinates: 53°06′27″N 18°05′51″E

Bydgoskie Fabryki Mebli
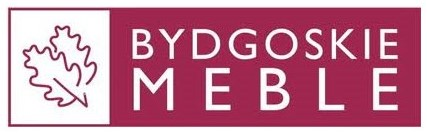
- Company type: Privately held company
- Industry: Furniture
- Founded: 1884 in Bromberg, German Empire
- Founder: Otto Pfefferkorn
- Defunct: 2016
- Fate: Acquired by Helvetia Meble Wieruszów
- Headquarters: Bydgoszcz, Poland
- Key people: Otto Pfefferkorn
- Products: Furniture
- Owner: Helvetia Meble Wieruszów
- Website: https://bydgoskiemeble.pl/

Bydgoszcz Furniture Factory (Polish: "Bydgoskie Fabryki Mebli") is a furniture factory in Bydgoszcz founded in 1884. It gained a pre-eminent role on the Polish and European market during the Polish People's Republic, before decreasing its activity at the end of the 20th century. The company has been taken over in 2016, though the brand is still used.

== History ==
=== Bromberg early wood and furniture industry ===
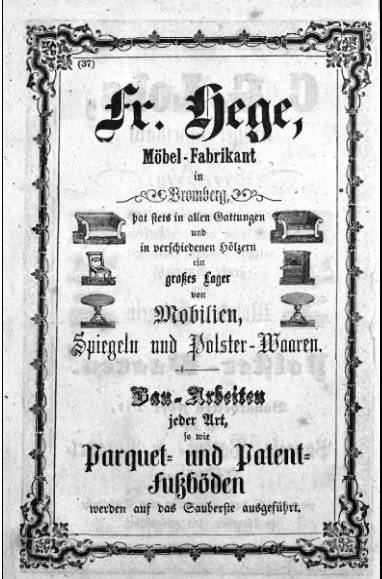
Advertising for "Hege furniture company", 1855

The 19th century wood and furniture industries in Prussian Bydgoszcz relied on the floating of timber to the German Empire, transiting via the Bydgoszcz Canal.

In the late 1890s, 80% of the lumber of Bromberg main sawmills came from Russian-occupied Congress Poland. Between 1890 and 1907, the banks of the lower Brda river housed up to 25 active sawmills, 12 of which were large plants owned by Berlin timber traders. The year 1906 marked the peak of the activity for the wood industry in Bromberg as one third of all timber deliveries to the German Empire passed through the city and wood-related employment (sawmill, joinery, craftsmen...) reached 2100 people.

The local furniture industry also benefited from this expanding mass trade. Hence in the 1870s, the "Hege furniture factory" (established in 1817) saw its activity developed significantly, as well as other local plants ("R. Reimann", "C.G Lobs"). In addition, before the end of the 19th century, several other smaller plants were established, such as the "Otto Kruger factory" or "J.Grünwald's Mobel Fabrik".

In 1923, there were 13 sawmills and 15 furniture factories registered in Bydgoszcz.

=== Prussian period ===
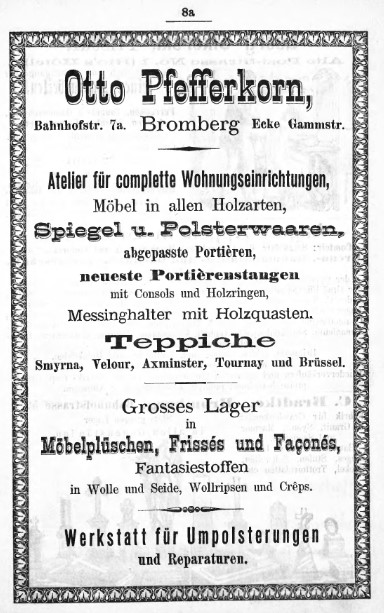
Advertising for "Otto Pfefferkorn factory", 1888

In 1884, Otto Pfefferkorn established the Otto Pfefferkorn's factory of upholstered furniture (Polish: Fabryki Mebli Wyściełanych Ottona Pfefferkornów). In the first years of activity, the company produced upholstery furniture (using bristle and horse hair), furniture for bedrooms and dining rooms. It also provided a service of interior decoration, as well as a repair shop for furnishing.

The plant was initially located in Bydgoszcz at "30 Friedrichsplatz", today's 27 Stary Rynek, but soon (1886) moved to Dworcowa Street. A year later, the Pfefferkorns purchased the house at 19 Dworcowa street: in 1909, the house at Nr.12 and a plot at 5 Podolska street were acquired and merged to allow the construction of a warehouse and a production unit. In 1910, Otto Pfefferkorn sold his property at 19 Dworcowa street and commissioned architect Fritz Weidner to build a magnificent tenement house at 12 Dworcowa street. He lived there and had a furniture showroom arranged on the ground floor.

Otto Pfeferkorn also owned till WWI an entire tenement at today's 6 Theatre Square, properties on Gdańska street and warehouses in Warsaw and Katowice. He led its firm by himself until the outbreak of World War I, combining production, commercial and service activities.

=== Interwar period ===
After Bydgoszcz returned to the re-created Polish state in 1920, Otto Pfefferkorn, his wife and their youngest son Paul left for Berlin, Germany, while their sons Otto Jr. and Karl stayed to manage the company. At the time, the firm was one of the largest furniture factories in Bydgoszcz, albeit owned entirely by German capital.

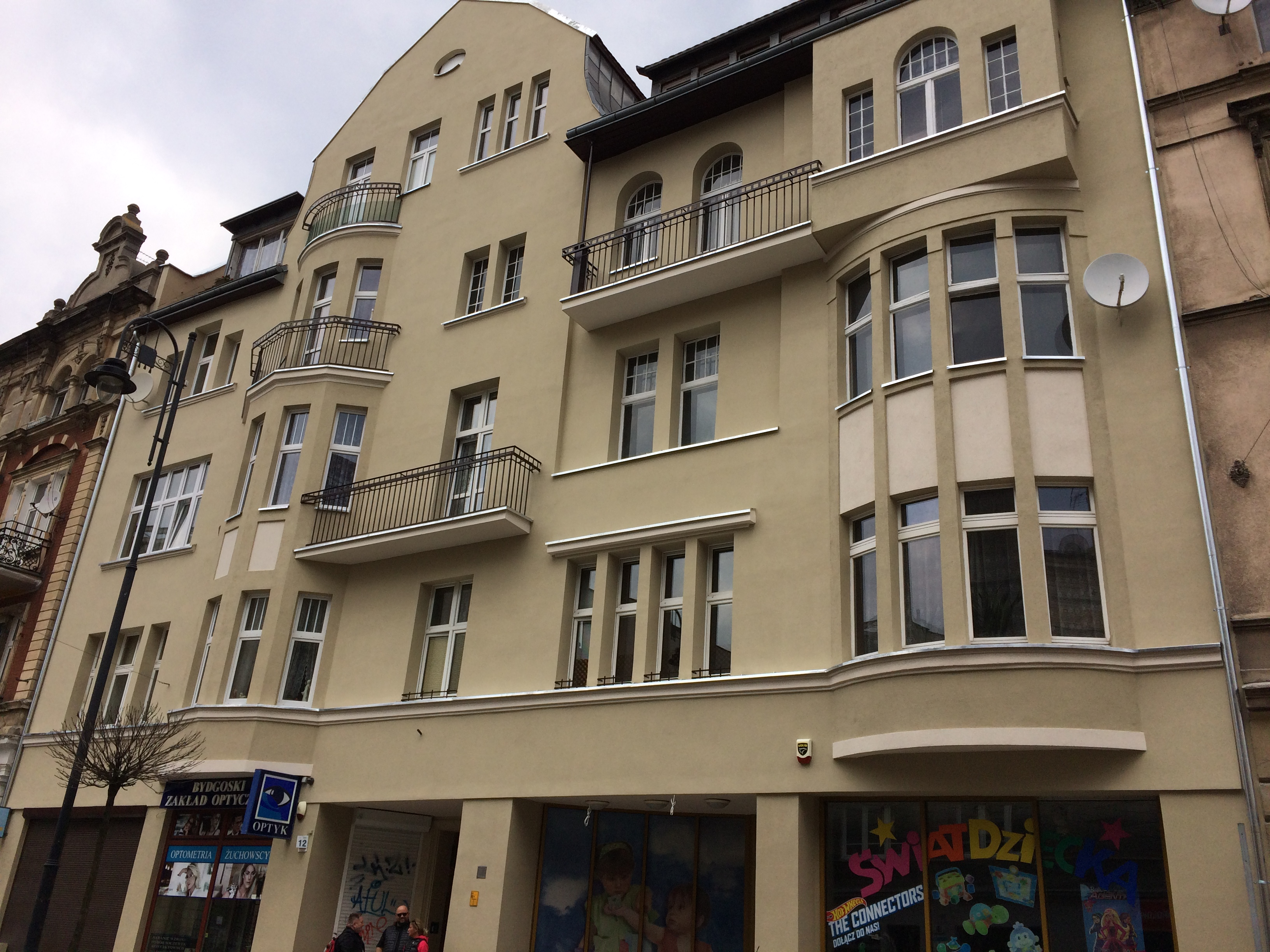
Pfefferlorn's tenement, at 12 Dworcowa street

High quality and luxurious upholstered furniture were then produced. In 1930–1931, a wing of the building on Podolska street was used to manufacture wood veneer furnishing. Furthermore, the floors at 12 Dworcowa street were re-organized, with a showroom on the ground and other showrooms on the upper floors divided into fully decorated sets (e.g. with carpets, paintings, crystals, porcelain or curtains): it was a novelty at the time.

Until the beginning of the 1930s, about 50 people were employed in the company.

The factory survived the times of the Great Depression, thanks to the launch of the production of radio boxes. Those items for the Philips brand were sought after in Warsaw and were later exported to United Kingdom, the Netherlands, Sweden and the Third Reich. The company's output increased by 40%, and the employment reached 700 people. In 1936, the plant building expanded with the leasing of a former factory of brushes and brushes "Piabama" located at 4 Pestalozziego street; in 1939, the company purchased the plot of the ancient cigar box factory "Mitschka i Spółka" at 89 Toruńska street. There, the newly built plant had its own steam engines, generator and water supply.

The firm used to buy most of the timber wood in the forests around Wejherowo and Złotów; the leather was imported from the Third Reich, while veneer and exotic woods came from France and Nazi Germany.

During the interwar period, Otto Pfefferkorn's company contracted leading architects and designers of the time (e.g. Piotr Lubiński, Nina Jankowska, Ludwik Paradisal, Henryk Pfefferkorn) who studied at the Faculty of "Interior Study and Equipment" of the Warsaw University of Technology. The catalogue was constantly developed and updated, following the changing fashions. The products were labelled with suggestive names, such as:

- Home offices "Chorzów", "Łowicz", "Wawel";
- Salons "Richmond", "Venetia", "London", "Warta";
- Bedrooms "Barock", "Gdańsk", "Kraków", "Syrena".

The Fabryka Mebli Artystycznych Otto Pfefferkorna in Bydgoszcz was, in the interwar, one of the most important factory of stylish furniture industry in Poland, together with Zygmunt Szczerbiński in Warszaw (est. 1900), Fabryka Mebli Artystycznych Sroczyńskiego in Poznań (est. 1906) and Fabryka Mebli Stylowych Adolfa Rozenthala in Łódź.

=== WWII ===
On 10 January 1941, Otto Pfefferkorn died in Berlin: the company moved to the hands of his three sons Otto, Karl and Paul. The production ensemble included, inter alia, land and buildings at 89 Toruńska street, 5 Podolska street and 6a Pomorska. The firm kept operating for the occupying forces under Otto's sons management.

During the occupation, German authorities used the company to produce elements for the Wehrmacht and for hospitals. In practical terms, manufactured goods were mainly furniture for barracks, wardrobes, chests for ammunition, steering wheels for the Navy and aircraft parts for the Luftwaffe. Lavish furnishing was still produced to the benefit, among others, of dignitaries of the Third Reich living in occupied Poland.

The plant production at 89 Toruńska street was reconfigured, with a new carpenter's shop and the manufacturing of cigar boxes and slats for a battery factory in Cologne. The building at 5 Podolska Street housed a drafting office and a furniture design office. In 1944, part of the produced furniture was sent to the "Pfefferkorn villa" near Berchtesgaden. In January 1945, the Pfefferkorn sons fled to Germany, leaving all their possessions.

In the years 1940–1944, around 500 people worked in the Pfefferkorn's plants.

=== PRL period ===
In January 1945, factory's assets were taken over by the Soviet authorities, claiming that the facility was post-German property. On 29 April 1945, the plant, like other factories in Bydgoszcz, was supposed to have all its means of production transferred to Soviet Union. These "'deportations" were avoided after the direct intervention of Polish authorities with Soviet representatives at the USSR Economic Mission in Warsaw in May 1945.

New managers were assigned to the different sites: Jan Stablewski at 89 Toruńska street, Paweł Janeczek at 4 Pestalozziego street and Edmund Woźniak at 5 Podolska street. In the first months of operation, 120 people were hired and the initial production was limited to beds and wardrobes for the needs of the army.

In 1946, the plant was nationalized and transformed into the State Factory of Artistic Furniture in Bydgoszcz (Polish: Państwowa Fabryka Mebli Artystycznych w Bydgoszczy). In the following years, the ensemble expanded, gradually taking over small, private furniture workshops in Bydgoszcz, but also in the surroundings, such as "Herbert Matthes Furniture Factory" (at Garbary Street), "Bronisław Siudowski's Carpenter Workshop", "Bronisław Bronikowski's Carpenter Workshop" or "Jakub Hechliński's Furniture Factory". On 21 January 1949, the State Factory was transformed into the Bydgoskie Fabryki Mebli and subordinated to the "Union of Furniture Industry" based in Poznań. The employed personnel kept growing, from 530 people in 1948 up to 852 in 1954, including 288 women.

In 1976, the "local industry" (Polish: Przemysł Terenowy), a group of small and medium-sized enterprises, whose primary goal was to meet the needs of residents and the local market, was liquidated. As a consequence, 16 nearby factories producing furniture moved under the management of Bydgoskie Fabryki Mebli, followed by 10 additional ones in 1987.

Since the 1960s, the domestic market was supplied either with furniture made of lacquers, less resistant to abrasion and mechanical damage, or with lower quality wood veneer; often the products exhibited external color differences as well as scratches or dents caused by poor handling and transportation.

The factory relied equivalently on its own designs and on foreign ones. The company had elaborated a subcontractor cooperation with the Swedish company IKEA, which supplied the firm with technical documentation designs and detailed construction requirements. The furniture produced under this label was then sold under the "IKEA" brand throughout Europe. A similar agreement had been concluded with the German furniture company KLOSE. Bydgoskie Fabryki Mebli manufacturing, at that time, still relied heavily on handwork, singling out itself from the mass production adopted in western countries.

In the post-war period, the company had a leading position on the domestic market and an important one in Europe as a manufacturer of stylish furniture. In the 1970s and 1980s, Bydgoskie Fabryki Mebli was regularly considered as one of the leading furniture exporters in Poland. At the peak of its activity, about 80% of the production was exported, half of which took the direction of Western countries (West Germany, France, United Kingdom, Sweden, Denmark, Finland, Austria, United States and Canada). The names of the products were adapted to these markets, with furniture sets named as "Lubeck", "Bremen", "Hamburg", "Ancona", "Ravenna", "Basel" or "Antwerpen". The company had several branches in Bydgoszcz and outside (e.g. Nakło nad Notecią, Świecie or Gniewkowo).

=== Recent history ===
On 21 February 1991, the company was moved under the State Treasury's sole proprietorship, renamed Bydgoskie Fabryki Mebli S.A.. On 16 November 1992, it was transformed into a Joint venture shared company with a capital owned in majority by Schieder Möbel Holding, a German furniture manufacturer.

A new upholstery workshop was built in the former factory of the firm "Eltra" at 146 Glinki street and in 1994, a new production hall was erected nearby. The new complex produced case furniture for export. At the end of the 1990s, the new direction sold the facilities at Podolska street and the plant in Nakło nad Notecią. In 1996, the firm employment reached 2200 people.

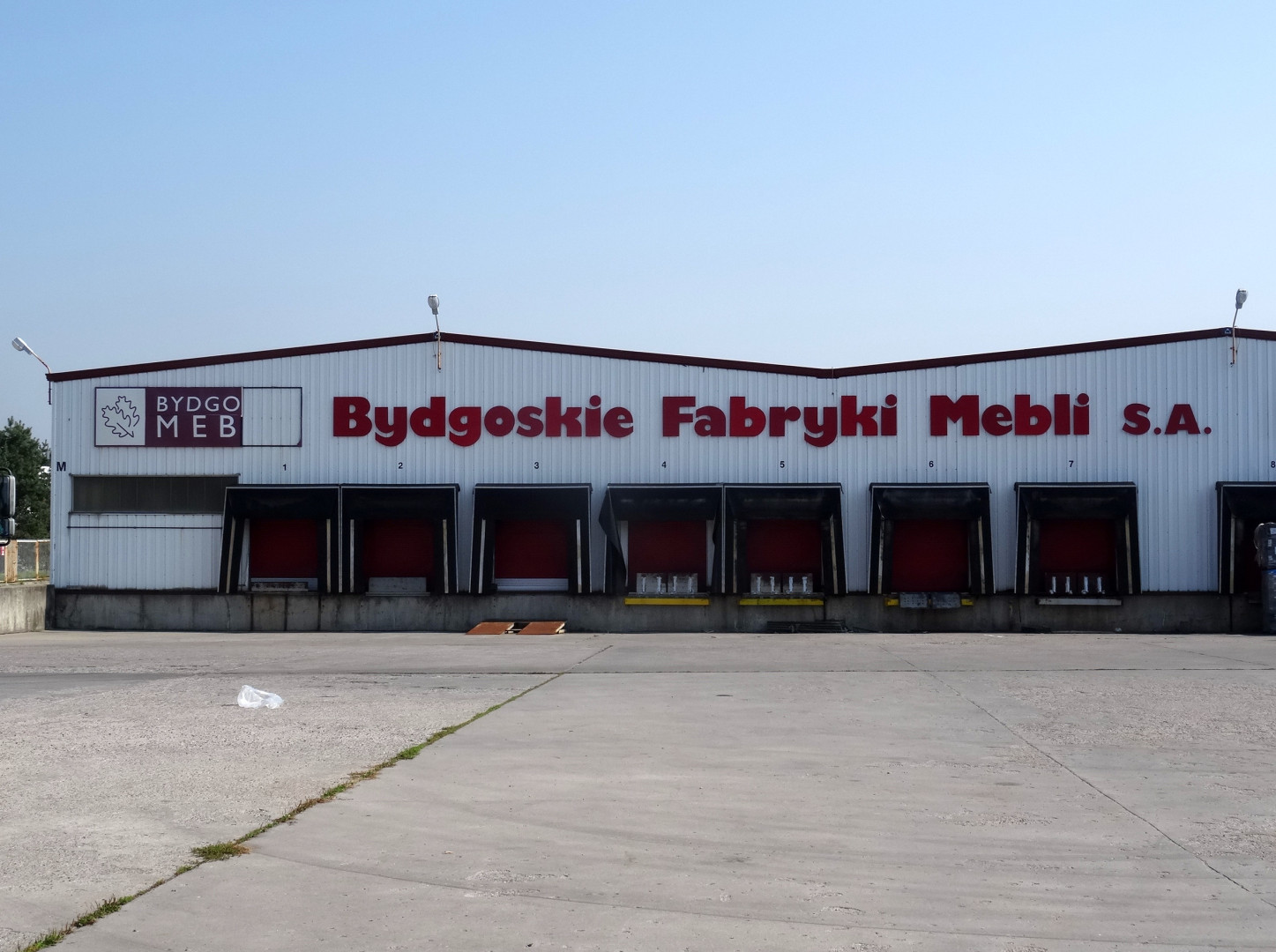
Plant at Glinki street, 2016

Once again, in 2000, the company sold the land and facilities at Rondo Toruński, where a shopping center Tesco was soon built (today, the plot houses a Leroy Merlin supermarket). In return, Bydgoskie Fabryki Mebli S.A. commissioned in Bydgoszcz a new production hall at Nowotoruńska street. In 2004, the Polish State Treasury finally sold all of its shares in the society. After 2005, Schieder Möbel Holding sold as well the buildings and the plot at Pestalozzi street to a residential estate developer (today's "Osiedle Paryskie"). Two years later, the holding "Schieder Möbel" declared bankruptcy. The ownership of the Bydgoszcz company moved into the hands of the Swiss furniture holding "IMS Group".

At the beginning of 2012, only 700 people worked at "Bydgoskie Fabryki Mebli S.A.".

In November 2016, the Swiss owner announced the liquidation of the company and the dismissal of part of its 300 employees. The management of the Nowotoruńska plant has been taken over by Helvetia Meble Wieruszów, which kept using the brand "Bydgoskie Fabryki Mebli".

== See also ==
- Bydgoszcz
- Gosfond
- Wood industry
- Furniture retailer

== Bibliography ==
- (in Polish) Łobaczewski, Tomasz (2009). Dzieje Fabryki Mebli Artystycznych Otto Pfefferkorna do 1945 roku. Materiały do dziejów kultury i sztuki Bydgoszczy i regionu. Zeszyt 14 [The history of the Otto Pfefferkorn Artistic Furniture Factory until 1945. Materials for the history of culture and art of Bydgoszcz and the region. issue 14.] (in Polish). Bydgoszcz: Pracownia Dokumentacji i Popularyzacji Zabytków Wojewódzkiego Ośrodka Kultury w Bydgoszczy.
