= Gosfond =

Gosfond (Russian: Госфонд, lit. State Fund) was a Soviet Trophy Brigade otherwise known as the State Agency for Literature formed in late 1944 by Georgy Malenkov on Stalin's orders. It was one of a number of war committees formed by the Soviet Union during the Vistula–Oder Offensive and tasked with appropriating foreign factories, manufactured goods, raw materials, livestock, farm machinery, fertilizer, crops, laboratories, libraries, museums, scientific archives from all of Soviet occupied Eastern Europe, and forcible relocations of (mostly German) engineers and scientists. The literature confiscated by Gosfond was transported to Soviet state libraries and cultural institutions including the National Lenin Library of the USSR, the National Historical Library, the National Polytechnical Library, the National Library for Foreign Literature and the National Saltykov-Shchedrin Public Library.

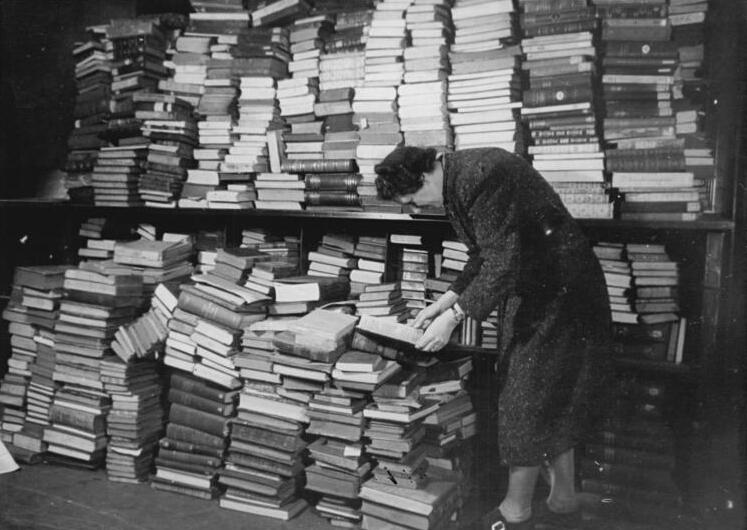
Rebuilding Berlin Staatsbibliothek Library, books in storage, 1949

Most looted documents and books, sent to the Soviet Union by Gosfond, were stored haphazardly, seldom catalogued and often destroyed by neglect and inattention. Items of scientific value were piled up in smaller public libraries and agricultural stations, where the books were never catalogued and could not be recalled for any useful activities. The origins of foreign acquisitions including the 1946 Gosfond delivery of 1,857 crates of books to libraries in Moscow were carefully concealed from librarians as well as the general public.

This specific aim is usually referred to by historians as the work of the Trophy Commission which led the trophy brigades behind the frontline. The plunder of artwork was directed by Igor Grabar of the Bureau of Experts. The commission became instrumental in the removal of industrial installations, materials, and valuables from all Soviet-occupied territories during the Vistula–Oder Offensive of the Red Army including Hungary, Romania, Finland and Poland (within its prewar borders), and later, from the Soviet Zone of Germany. The commission's Arts Committee headed by Andrei Konstantinov was in charge of the registration and Soviet distribution of trophy artworks beginning June 1945. The transports included valuables stolen by Nazi Germany from as far as Latvia and Italy, appropriated by the Soviets.

== Soviet Trophy Brigades ==
As early as 1942, the USSR formed special Red Army Trophy Brigades with the task of removing valuables from occupied territories (including Germany) and taking them back to the Soviet Union - usually by train convoys. The organization made responsible for receiving and cataloging these items, the "Commission on Reception and Registration of Trophy Valuables", was established just before the war's end in April 1945. The institution was soon disbanded as it had been overwhelmed by the sheer number of objects being sent back to Russia by the troops. The early part of 1946 saw some 12,500 crates of books and documents, along with other valuables from German libraries, which were allocated to the State Historical Museum in Moscow and to the Hermitage in Leningrad, and as far afield as Turkmenistan and Tajikistan. In April 1998 under Boris Yeltsin the Russian Duma nationalized these items; it also relieved any claims made on all Russian property still remaining in foreign lands.

The Trophy-Brigade concept included dismantling anything of utility in Germany, and using it to rebuild the Soviet economy as retributions.

…The most important dismantling action, however, was carried out beginning in March 1946. Leuna [the Leunawerke, an I.G. Farbenindustrie manufacturing plant in Merseburg] deployed 30,732 of its workers and 7,376 other plant personnel to assist 400 Soviet officers and 1,000 to 1,200 soldiers from the Red Army to remove 120,000 tons of machines and structural iron and steel from the works. Included in a long list of affected installations were eight working compressors for synthetic gas, large scale installations for methanol synthesis, and various machines, apparatus, and installations for synthetic gasoline production. What is more, the Soviets seized 117 journals and 514 books from the works library, in all a total of 1,067 volumes.

Vladimir Shabinsky, a Russian officer who later defected to the West, gave his personal account of his own service as member of a Soviet Trophy Brigade.

At that time [1945], I was a lieutenant colonel in the Red Army. I was working in Berlin for the 'Special Committee' of the Soviet Government. Formed in late 1944 and headed by Georgy Malenkov, the committee was charged with removing factories, manufactured goods, raw materials, livestock, farm machinery, fertilizer, crops, laboratories, libraries, museums, scientific archives, engineers and scientists from all of Eastern Europe. The Soviet Union, after years of devastating war, was in desperate need of such items and experts. It also wanted to make sure that Germany would never again be a military and industrial power. When the Americans left Saxony and Thuringia, the Berlin staff of the Special Committee ordered me to evacuate a cement plant from the city of Nordhausen. Since the committee had 70,000 greedy agents operating in East Germany, I moved fast to claim this plant for my branch, the Ministry of Building Materials..." — Vladimir Shabinsky

The library section of the Russian Trophy Brigades was known as the "State Agency for Literature", or, "Gosfond". The Soviet government had set up this agency to allocate the confiscated literature to Soviet libraries and cultural institutions. The plan involved Gosfond allocating the materials to enhance existing collection in Russia and acquiring meaningful additions. However, the Agency became overwhelmed with the numbers of books sent from Germany. Eventually, the exercise degenerated into a mechanical process of distribution, and the beneficiary libraries proved unable to absorb the works, or in some cases, even to store them.

In a meeting of March 14, 1946, a committee distributed 1,857 crates from some thirty institutional and private libraries (including those of top Nazis as von Ribbentrop and Goebbels) among five Soviet libraries: the National Lenin Library of the USSR, the National Historical Library, the National Polytechnical Library, the National Library for Foreign Literature and the National Saltykov-Shchedrin Public Library.

Lieutenant Colonel Margarita Rudomino, director of the Library for Foreign Literature in Moscow, and an associate on the staff of the Plenipotentiary State Special Defense Committee, and part of the Soviet Trophy Brigade, argued that the German Library (Deutsche Bibliothek-Deutsche Bücherei) in Leipzig was needed for re-building Germany and restoring German cultural identity. Thus over two million volumes were evacuated to Thuringia, but they were then returned to the Leipzig library. However, she also argued for the return of the books from the Sächsische Landesbibliothek (Saxon State Library) in Dresden, but they were sent to Russia by mistake, and they were returned, in part, in 1957.

Not all transfers of captured documents went well. Many of the books sent to the Soviet Union by the Gosfond and the various Trophy Brigades did not benefit either the Soviets or anyone else. With the overwhelming numbers of materials received, they were often parceled out to smaller libraries and institutes, who often received materials wholly inappropriate for their functions. As a result, many of the items were stored haphazardly, seldom cataloged or inventoried, and often were destroyed by neglect and inattention. Items which were needed at large research institutes were sent to smaller public libraries and agricultural stations, where the books were never cataloged and could not be recalled for inter-library loan or other useful activities.
