= Jan Popczyk =

Polish electrical engineer (1945–2024)

- Born: 21 September 1945; Ślęcin, Poland
- Died: 13 September 2024 (aged 78); Gliwice, Poland
- Resting place: Central Cemetery, Gliwice
- Education: Silesian University of Technology
- Known for: Polish energy transition project
- Awards: Order of Polonia Restituta
- Scientific career
- Fields: electrical grids, energy transition, renewable energy sources
- Workplaces: Silesian University of Technology, Association of Polish Electrical Engineers, Polish Academy of Sciences, UN Economic and Social Council, Ministry of Finance, CENTREL

Jan Popczyk (21 September 1945 – 13 September 2024) was a Polish electrical engineer and professor of technical sciences. President of Polskie Sieci Elektroenergetyczne (the Polish power grid operator), member of the Committee on Power Engineering of the Polish Academy of Sciences and of the Association of Polish Electrical Engineers. President of the Founding Association of Electroprosumerism. President of the 3x20 Cluster Association, vice-president of the Polish Green Energy Technology Platform. Co-founder of the Dolivo Association. Creator of the Common Platform for Energy Transition.

== Biography ==
Born on 21 September 1945 in Ślęcin in what was then the Kielce Voivodship. In 1970 he graduated with a master's degree in electrical engineering from the Faculty of Electrical Engineering of the Silesian University of Technology. At the same time, he began doctoral studies and worked as an assistant. Four years later he completed his PhD degree, and in 1979 his habilitation degree (dr hab.). He was awarded the title of professor in 1987 and the position of full professor (profesor zwyczajny) in 1997 (at the Silesian University of Technology). Initiator and head of postgraduate studies "Energy Market" at the university.

Specialist in energy transition, distributed generation, renewable energy sources and prosumerism in electricity. Pioneer of statistics, probabilistics and optimisation in electrical grids. Co-author of the Polish energy transition project and participant in its implementation. In 1990, he chaired the parliamentary team for the reform of the Polish electricity system and initiated the establishment of the Polish Electrical Grids. In 1998–1999, he served as an advisor to the Minister of Finance Leszek Balcerowicz, and in 1995–1999 as an advisor to the Upper Silesian Electricity Company (now the Gliwice Branch of Tauron Dystrybucja). Chairman of the CENTREL organisation from 1994 to 1995, which, during his term of office, led to the interconnection of the electrical system of the Visegrád Group with that of Western Europe. Member of the Energy Committee of the UN Economic and Social Council. Author of the White Paper on the Energy Transition to Electroprosumerism published under the auspices of the Polish Senate's Extraordinary Committee for Climate.

He was awarded the Knight's Cross of the Order of Polonia Restituta for his merits in the field of electrical power engineering. Winner of the Creator of the New Power Engineering award. Honorary member of the Association of Polish Electrical Engineers.

Jan Popczyk died on 13 September 2024 in Gliwice and was buried in the Central Cemetery there.
