= Ludwik de Laveaux =

Ludwik de Laveaux may refer to:

- Ludwik de Laveaux (officer) (1891–1969), Polish Army officer
- Ludwik de Laveaux (painter) (1868–1894), Polish painter
