= Warzyn Pierwszy =

- Village
- Location within Poland
- Coordinates: 50°38′N 20°11′E
- Country: Poland
- Voivodeship: Świętokrzyskie
- County: Jędrzejów
- Gmina: Nagłowice

Warzyn Pierwszy [ˈvaʐɨn ˈpjɛrfʂɨ] is a village in the administrative district of Gmina Nagłowice, within Jędrzejów County, Świętokrzyskie Voivodeship, in south-central Poland. It lies approximately 8 km (5 mi) south-east of Nagłowice, 9 km (6 mi) west of Jędrzejów, and 42 km (26 mi) south-west of the regional capital Kielce.
