= Trzciniec, Świętokrzyskie Voivodeship =

Trzciniec
- Village
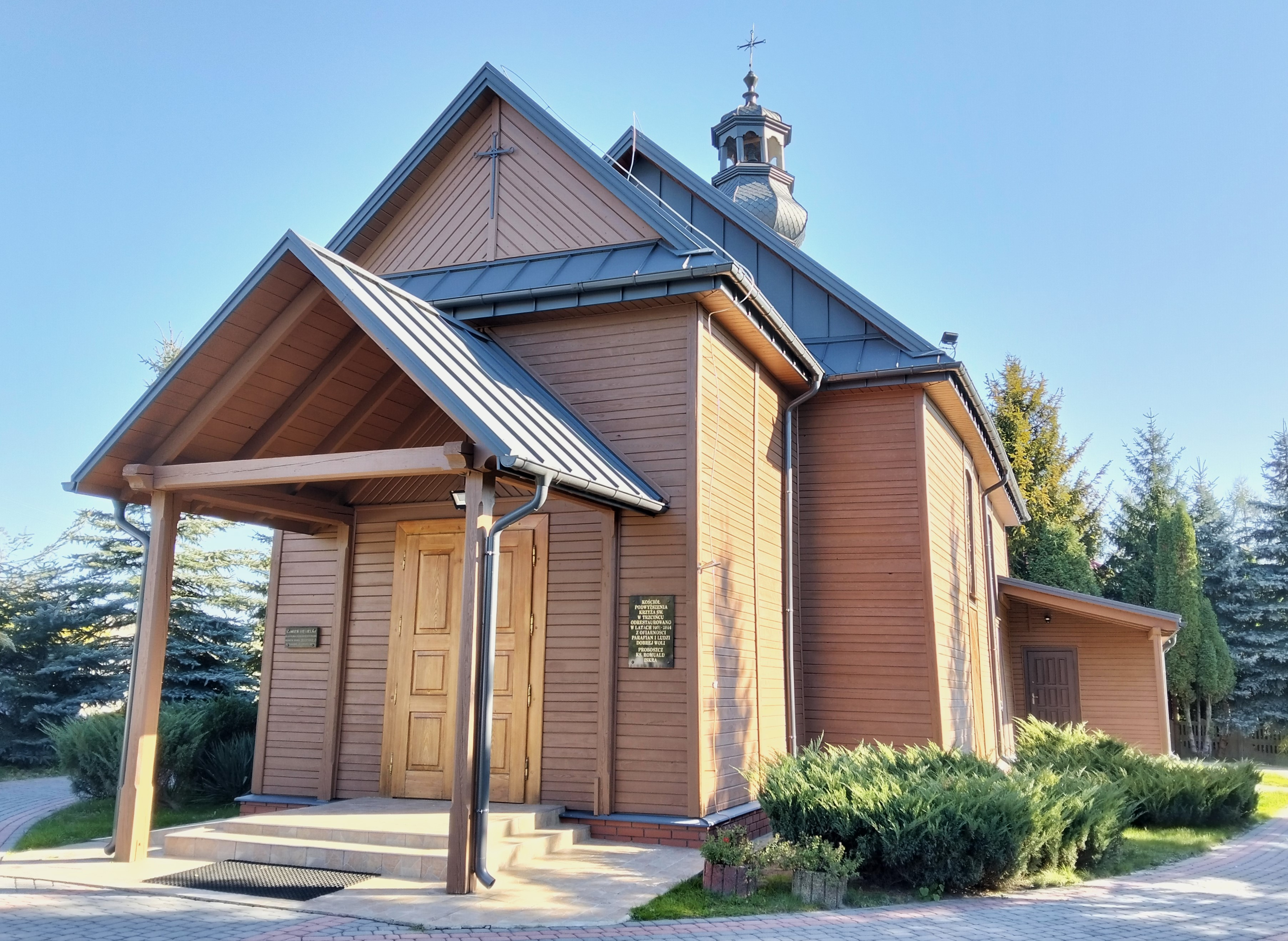
- Catholic church

- Location within Poland
- Coordinates: 50°37′39″N 20°5′20″E
- Country: Poland
- Voivodeship: Świętokrzyskie
- County: Jędrzejów
- Gmina: Nagłowice

Trzciniec [ˈtʂt͡ɕiɲɛt͡s] is a village in the administrative district of Gmina Nagłowice, within Jędrzejów County, Świętokrzyskie Voivodeship, in south-central Poland. It lies approximately 6 km (4 mi) south of Nagłowice, 15 km (9 mi) west of Jędrzejów, and 47 km (29 mi) south-west of the regional capital Kielce.
