= Cierno-Żabieniec =

- Village
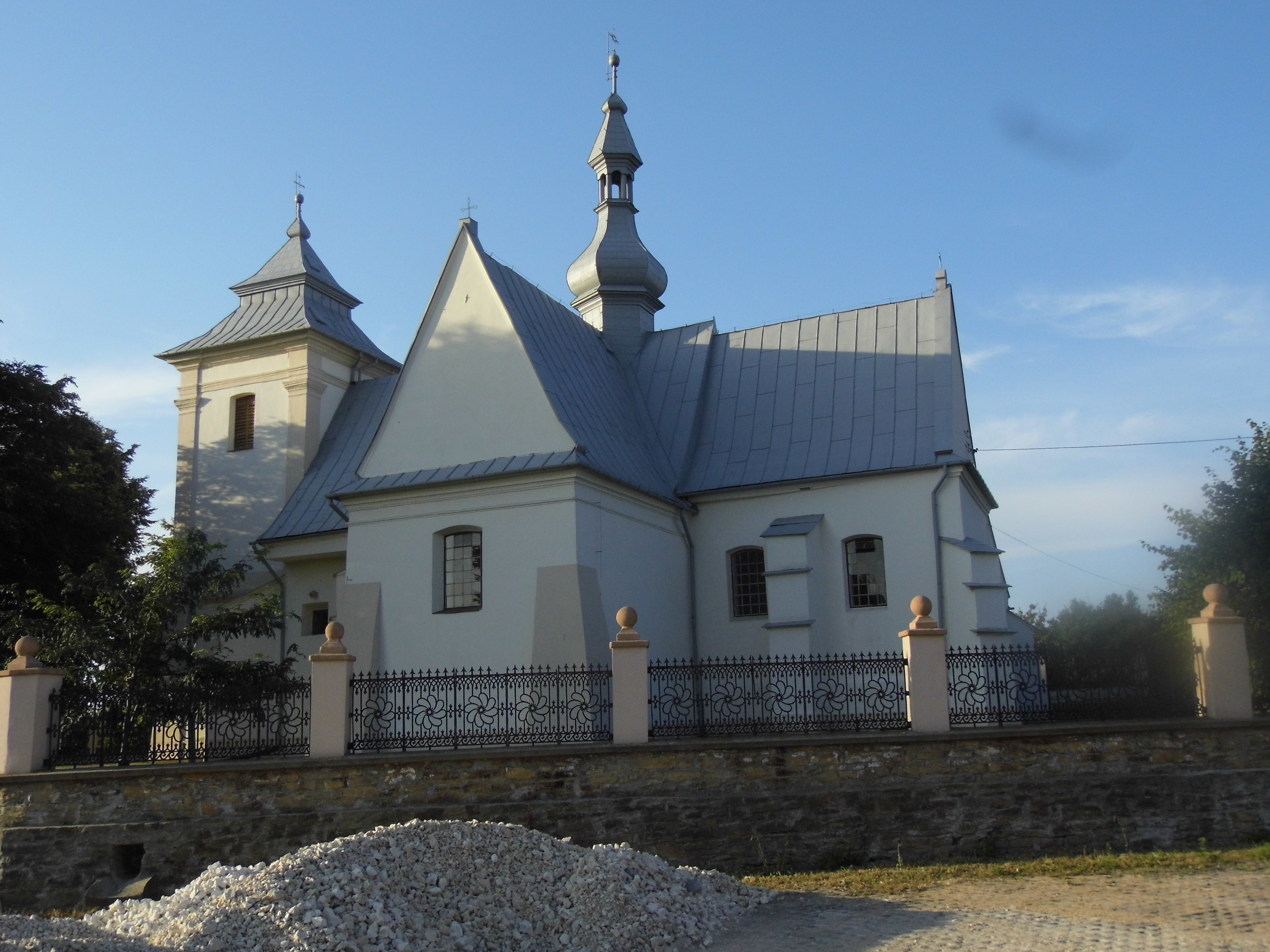
- Catholic church

- Location within Poland
- Coordinates: 50°40′58″N 20°10′52″E
- Country: Poland
- Voivodeship: Świętokrzyskie
- County: Jędrzejów
- Gmina: Nagłowice
- Population: 480

Cierno-Żabieniec [ˈt͡ɕɛrnɔ ʐaˈbjɛɲɛt͡s] is a village in the administrative district of Gmina Nagłowice, within Jędrzejów County, Świętokrzyskie Voivodeship, in south-central Poland. It lies approximately 6 km (4 mi) east of Nagłowice, 11 km (7 mi) north-west of Jędrzejów, and 38 km (24 mi) south-west of the regional capital Kielce.
