= Warzyn Drugi =

- Village
- Location within Poland
- Coordinates: 50°37′57″N 20°10′54″E
- Country: Poland
- Voivodeship: Świętokrzyskie
- County: Jędrzejów
- Gmina: Nagłowice

Warzyn Drugi [ˈvaʐɨn ˈdruɡi] is a village in the administrative district of Gmina Nagłowice, within Jędrzejów County, Świętokrzyskie Voivodeship, in south-central Poland. It lies approximately 8 km (5 mi) south-east of Nagłowice, 9 km (6 mi) west of Jędrzejów, and 42 km (26 mi) south-west of the regional capital Kielce.
