= Kuźnice, Świętokrzyskie Voivodeship =

Kuźnice
- Village
- Location within Poland
- Coordinates: 50°39′49″N 20°2′40″E
- Country: Poland
- Voivodeship: Świętokrzyskie
- County: Jędrzejów
- Gmina: Nagłowice

Kuźnice [kuʑˈnit͡sɛ] is a village in the administrative district of Gmina Nagłowice, within Jędrzejów County, Świętokrzyskie Voivodeship, in south-central Poland. It lies approximately 5 km (3 mi) west of Nagłowice, 19 km (12 mi) west of Jędrzejów, and 48 km (30 mi) south-west of the regional capital Kielce.
