= Battle for trade =

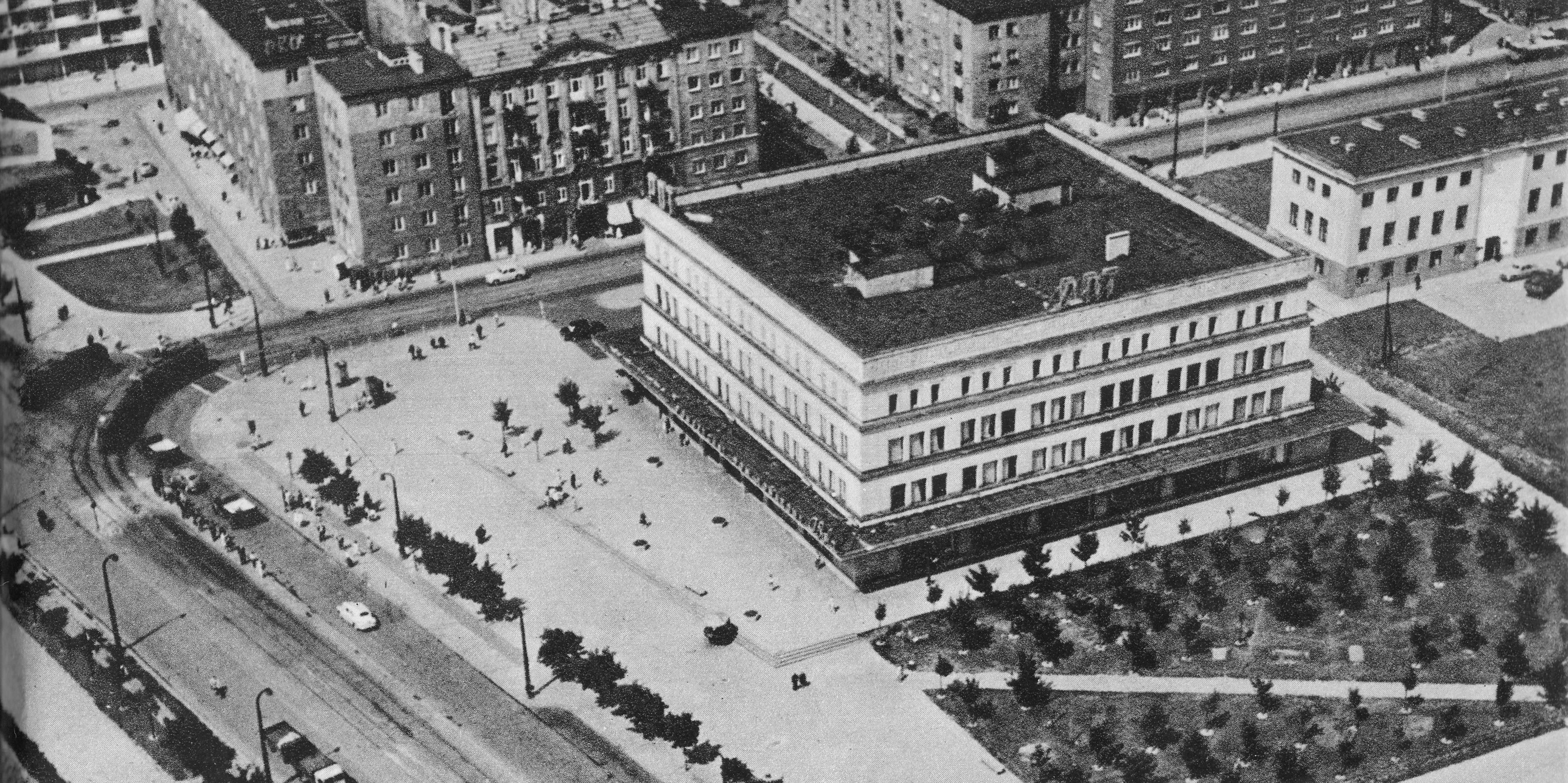
Powszechny Dom Towarowy Wola in Warszaw

The battle for trade (Polish: Bitwa o handel; also translated as trade battle or battle over trade) was an element of the state politics in the early period of communist takeover of Poland (1946–49) according to which new laws and regulations succeeded in significantly decreasing the size of the private sector in Polish trade, in order to facilitate the transformation of Polish economy from capitalism to Soviet communism's planned economy.

According to historian Anne Applebaum, "The Battle for Trade took the form of rigid price regulation and high taxation, accompanied by criminal penalties for the failure to fill out proper forms, as well as a massive licensing and permit system. All entrepreneurs had to have business licenses that required them to prove they were professionally qualified ... ."

The larger private shops were nationalized or closed, and government-owned chains ( Powszechne Domy Towarowe) and cooperatives were created to replace them, but that was inefficient as more shops were closed than opened and led to lasting difficulties for Polish people in obtaining consumer goods. Battle for trade was introduced by Polish communist propaganda to denote the importance and urgency of the fight against "capitalist profiteers and saboteurs".

== History ==
The 'battle' began when Polish communist Hilary Minc proposed and succeeded in passing a series of reforms during the 1947 Polish Workers Party congress accompanying the Three-Year Plan. On 13–14 April, the 1947 congress of the Polish Workers Party accepted that direction.

On 2 June 1947 new laws were passed to help the government in the 'battle':

- on fighting high prices and excessive profit in trade (maximum prices were introduced by Biuro Cen (Prices Bureau), and owners of shops where prices were found higher than maximum were subject to a high fine and five years of imprisonment when found by a special commission (The Special Commission for Counteracting Profiteering and Abuses — Komisja Specjalna do Walki ze Spekulacją i Nadużyciami))
- new fines or surtaxes (domiary) were levied on the private sector, applicable when government officials found that the private business was generating higher revenues than declared
- on citizens tax commissions and social controllers (Społeczne Komitety Kontroli Cen, Public Committees of Price Control)
- on concessions to run trade and building enterprises
- private shops were banned in the centres of large cities
- private shops were banned from trading certain goods
- merchants' organizations were disbanded

The new legislation allowed the government to accuse many shopkeepers of sabotage, imprison them and nationalise their enterprises.

The number of private retail shops fell from 150,000–185,000 in 1946 (numbers vary) through 131,000 in 1947 to 58,000–70,000 in 1949. Wholesale stores fell from 3300 to 1100. By 1953, only 7% of shops in Poland remained in private hands (about 14,000 in 1955); 75% of craftsmen's workshops were closed or nationalized (to 80,000).

Since fewer government-run shops were opened, it marked the beginning of the shortage economy, as people found it increasingly difficult to find a shop with everyday items.

== See also ==
- State Agricultural Farm
- Sovietization
- Eastern Bloc economies
