= Brynica Mokra =

- Village
- Location within Poland
- Coordinates: 50°39′23″N 20°10′49″E
- Country: Poland
- Voivodeship: Świętokrzyskie
- County: Jędrzejów
- Gmina: Nagłowice
- Population: 230

Brynica Mokra [brɨˈnit͡sa ˈmɔkra] is a village in the administrative district of Gmina Nagłowice, within Jędrzejów County, Świętokrzyskie Voivodeship, in south-central Poland. It lies approximately 6 km (4 mi) south-east of Nagłowice, 9 km (6 mi) west of Jędrzejów, and 40 km (25 mi) south-west of the regional capital Kielce.
