= Deszno, Świętokrzyskie Voivodeship =

Deszno
- Village
- Location within Poland
- Coordinates: 50°36′N 20°8′E
- Country: Poland
- Voivodeship: Świętokrzyskie
- County: Jędrzejów
- Gmina: Nagłowice

Deszno [ˈdɛʂnɔ] is a village in the administrative district of Gmina Nagłowice, within Jędrzejów County, Świętokrzyskie Voivodeship, in south-central Poland. It lies approximately 9 km (6 mi) south of Nagłowice, 13 km (8 mi) west of Jędrzejów, and 47 km (29 mi) south-west of the regional capital Kielce.

== Notable people ==
- Wincenty Pstrowski (1904-1948) miner awarded for his exceptional productivity
