= Three-Year Plan =

Economic reform plan in 1940s Poland

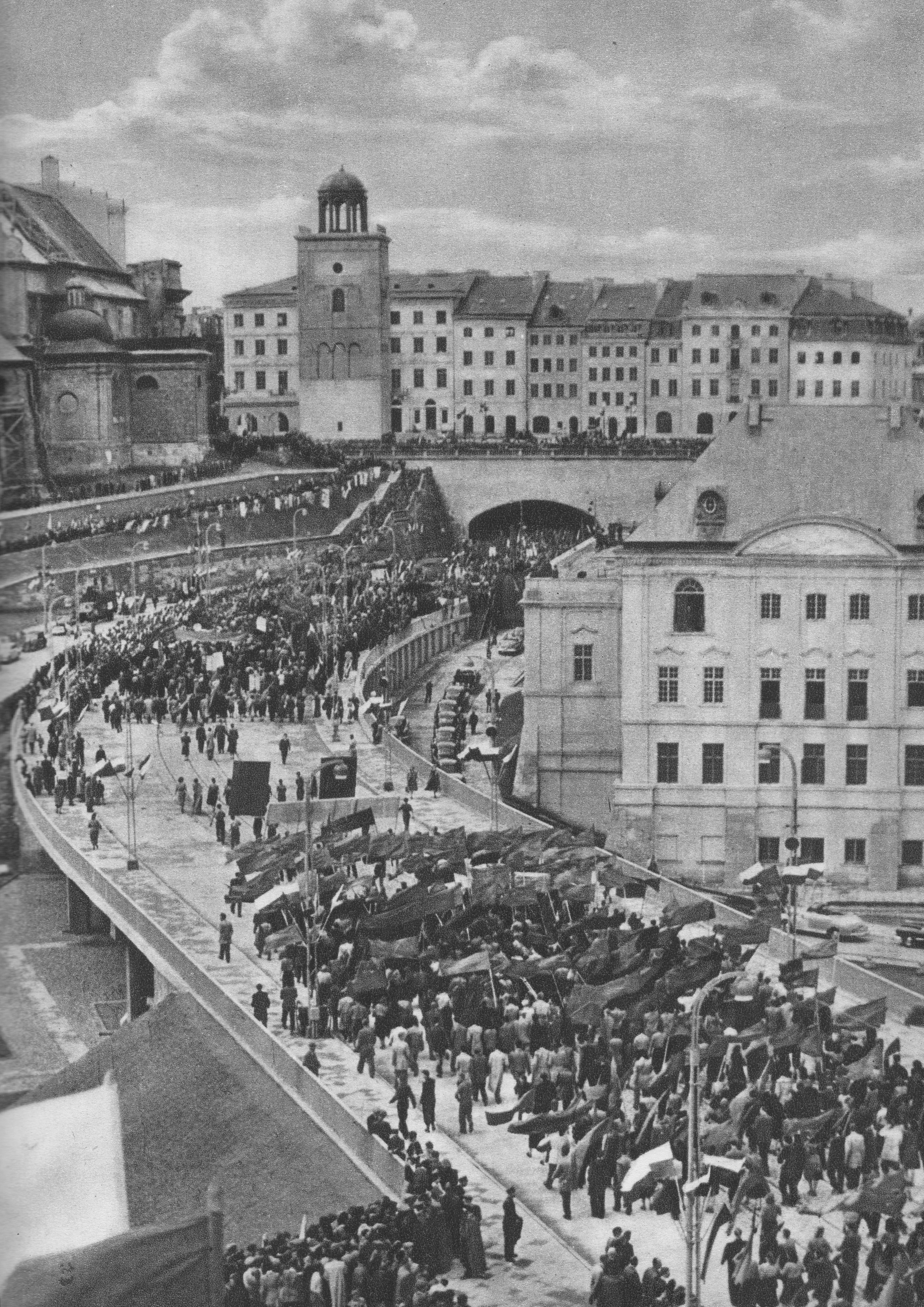
Inauguration of the East-West Route in Warsaw, 22 July 1949

The Plan of Reconstructing the Economy (Polish: Plan Odbudowy Gospodarki), commonly known as the Three-Year Plan (Polish: plan trzyletni) was a centralized plan created by the Polish communist government to rebuild Poland after the devastation of the Second World War. The plan was carried out between 1947 and 1949. It succeeded in its primary aim of largely rebuilding Poland from the devastation of the war, as well as in increasing output of Polish industry and agriculture.

== Development and goals ==
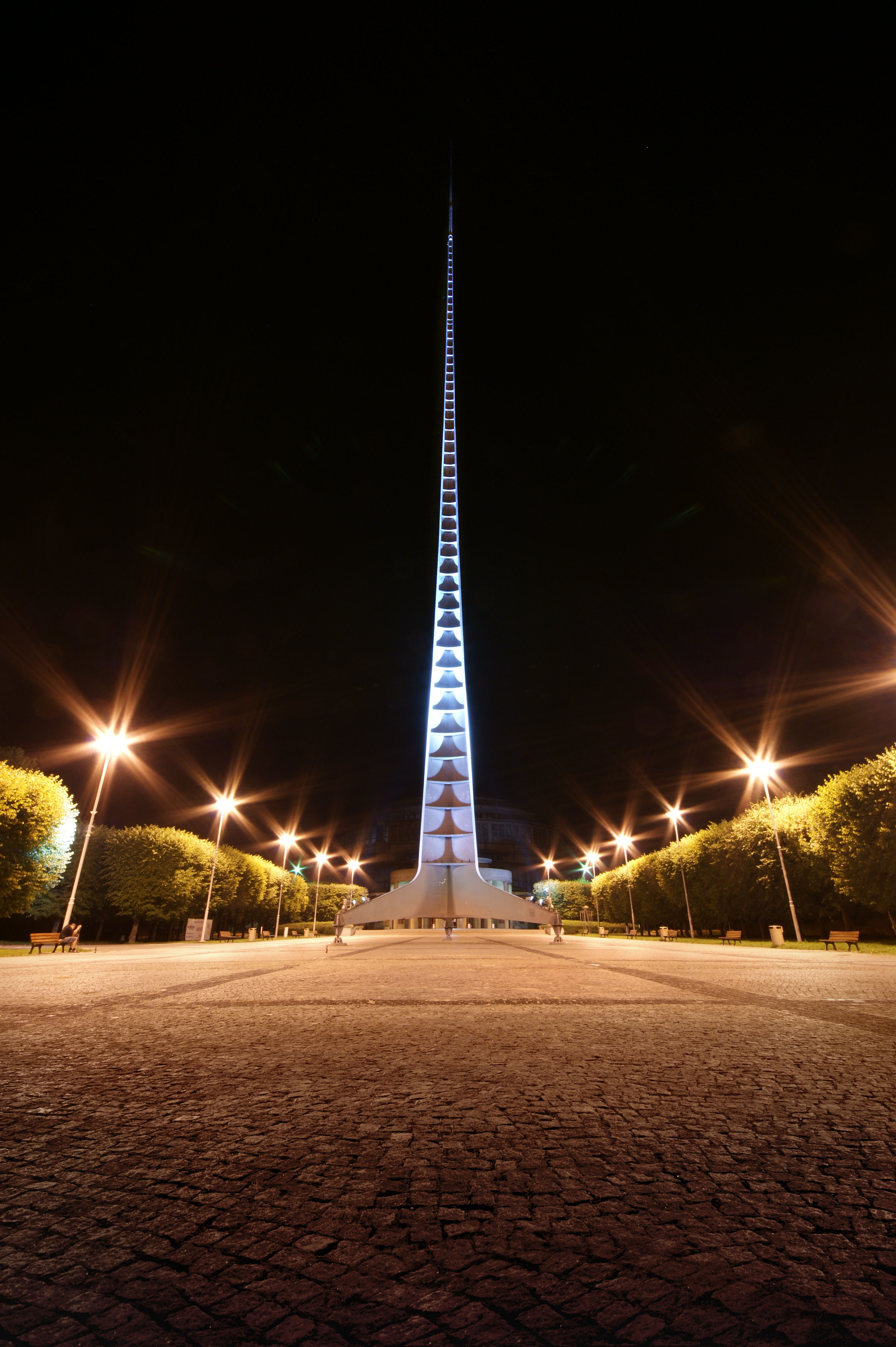
The spire in Wrocław, erected in 1948 for the Recovered Territories Exhibition. Integrating the Recovered Territories with the rest of the country was one of the main assumptions and goals of the 3-Year Plan.

Poland suffered heavy losses during World War II. In addition to significant population losses, it suffered catastrophic damage to its infrastructure during the war; the losses in national resources and infrastructure amounted to over 30% percent of pre-war potential. Rebuilding of the economy was also made more difficult by the major territorial changes of Poland after World War II.

The Three-Year Plan was developed and monitored by the Central Planning Office (Centralny Urząd Planowania), a body of the government tasked with creation of economic policy, and in the early years dominated by a more liberal Polish Socialist Party (PPS) faction. Among the economists involved in its development was the then CUP director, Czesław Bobrowski. CUP centralized planning for the entire Polish economy was previously broken into separate bodies working on planning for separate branches.

The plan, significantly influenced by the PPS, was designed to create a balance between the private sector, the public sector and the cooperatives. Instead of ideology, commonly stressed by later communist plans, it concentrated on the realistic problems and ways to address them.

On 21 September 1946 the State National Council (KRN), a Polish communist-dominated unelected Polish parliament accepted the plan for the Polish economy up to 1949. On 2 July 1947 the newly elected Sejm declared that: "The primary goal of the national economy in the years 1947-1949 is to raise the living conditions of working classes to above the pre-war levels."

The plan as described by the above bodies was designed to develop industry and service sectors, foreign trade and ensure the supply of basic consumer items. The plan specified the size of industrial and agricultural production to be achieved in the following years. In 1949 both the industrial and agricultural productions were to be above the pre-war levels. The industrial output was also to be higher than agricultural output. The plan did not involve creation of new industrial centers, only the rebuilding of the old ones (unless they were over 50% destroyed).

== Results and assessment ==
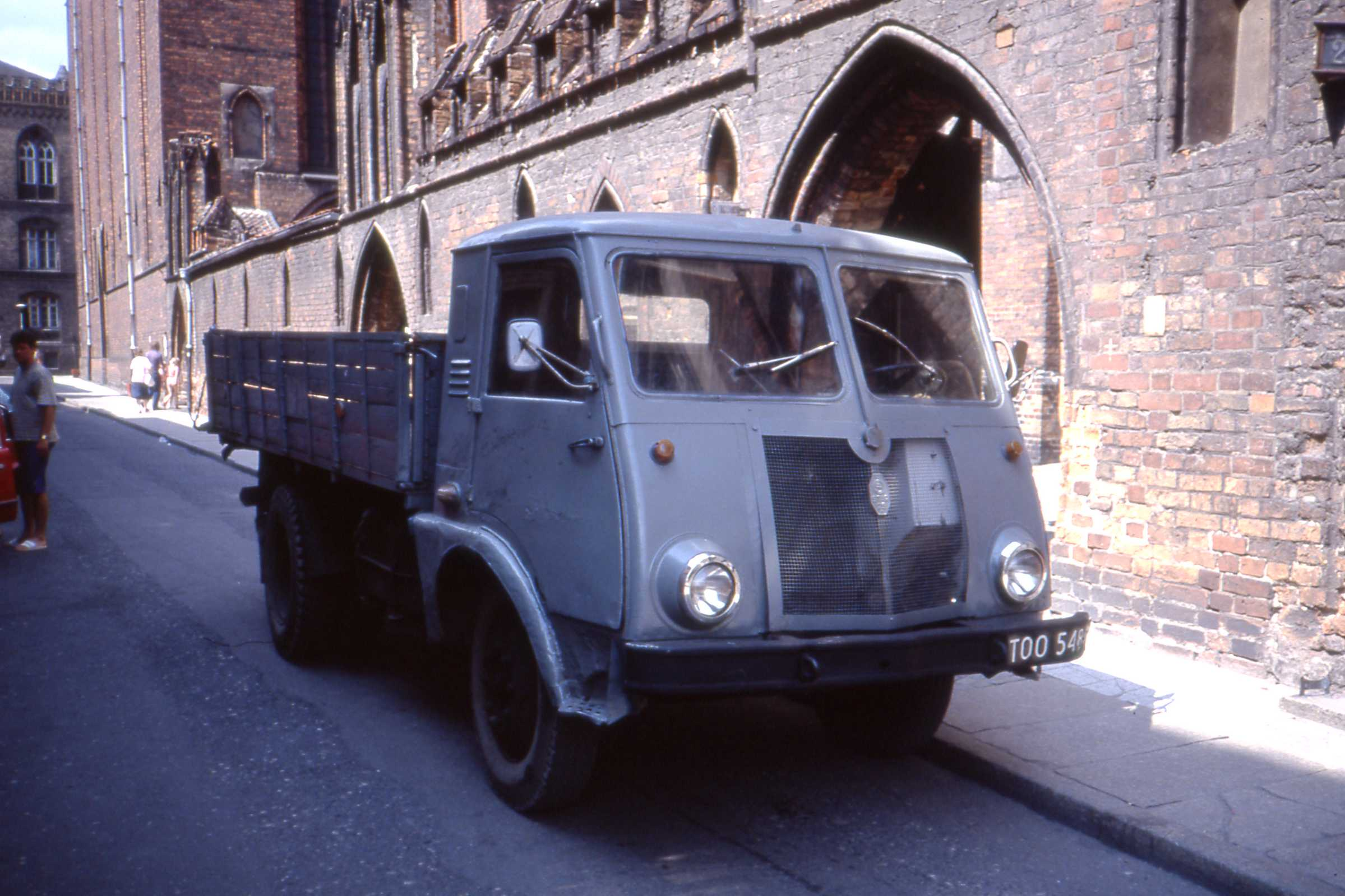
Post-war Polish truck brand – Star

Due to the dedication of substantial resources to industrial rebuilding, and the successful adoption of the Stakhanovite movement (the communist propaganda of that time created a new "hero of the working class", Wincenty Pstrowski), where workers were encouraged to work above their quota, the expected increase in industrial output was reached ahead of schedule. However, the agricultural output did not increase as much as predicted, partially due to bad weather in 1947, partially due to inefficiencies involved in collectivization of farming and finally, partially due to side-effects of the battle for trade, which damaged traditional supply chains. In 1948 industrial production was 30% higher compared to 1939, but agricultural production was 30% lower (compared to the 1934-38 period).

The battle for trade, pushed for by Stalinist hardliners like Hilary Minc, suggested that both the cooperative and private sectors should be eliminated and the public sector should be dominant, assumptions contrary to the foundations of the three-year plan which stated that all three sectors are equal. The battle for trade also resulted in a decrease of the craftmanship sector.

Already in 1949 the stress was moved from consumer goods to producer goods, and light industry development was slowed. The next plan in the Polish communist economy was the Six-Year Plan (1950–1956), much more critically assessed by modern historians and economists, as by 1950 the CUP and Polish government were dominated by Stalinist hardliners, and PPS economists responsible for creation of the Three-Year Plan were no longer influencing government policy. The Six-Year Plan, designed to bring the economy of Poland in line with the Soviet economy, concentrated on heavy industrialization, with projects such as Nowa Huta.

Rebuilding of the Polish economy was also slowed in 1947, as Soviet influence caused the Polish government to reject the American-sponsored Marshall Plan, designed to aid European economies in post-war rebuilding.

With the simultaneous rebuilding of the cities, substantial migration from rural areas to urban centers occurred, increasing urbanization. Warsaw and other ruined cities were cleared of rubble and rebuilt with great speed during those years. In 1939, 60% of Poles worked in agriculture and 13% in industry; in 1949, the figures were 47% and 21%, respectively.

The three-year plan is widely considered a success and the only efficient economic plan in the history of People's Republic of Poland. It succeeded in its primary aim: mostly rebuilding Poland from the devastation of the war, as well as in increasing output of Polish industry and agriculture.

== See also ==
- The Fourth and Fifth Plans of USSR which were aimed at rebuilding USSR after World War II
- Eastern Bloc economies
