= Rakoszyn =

- Village
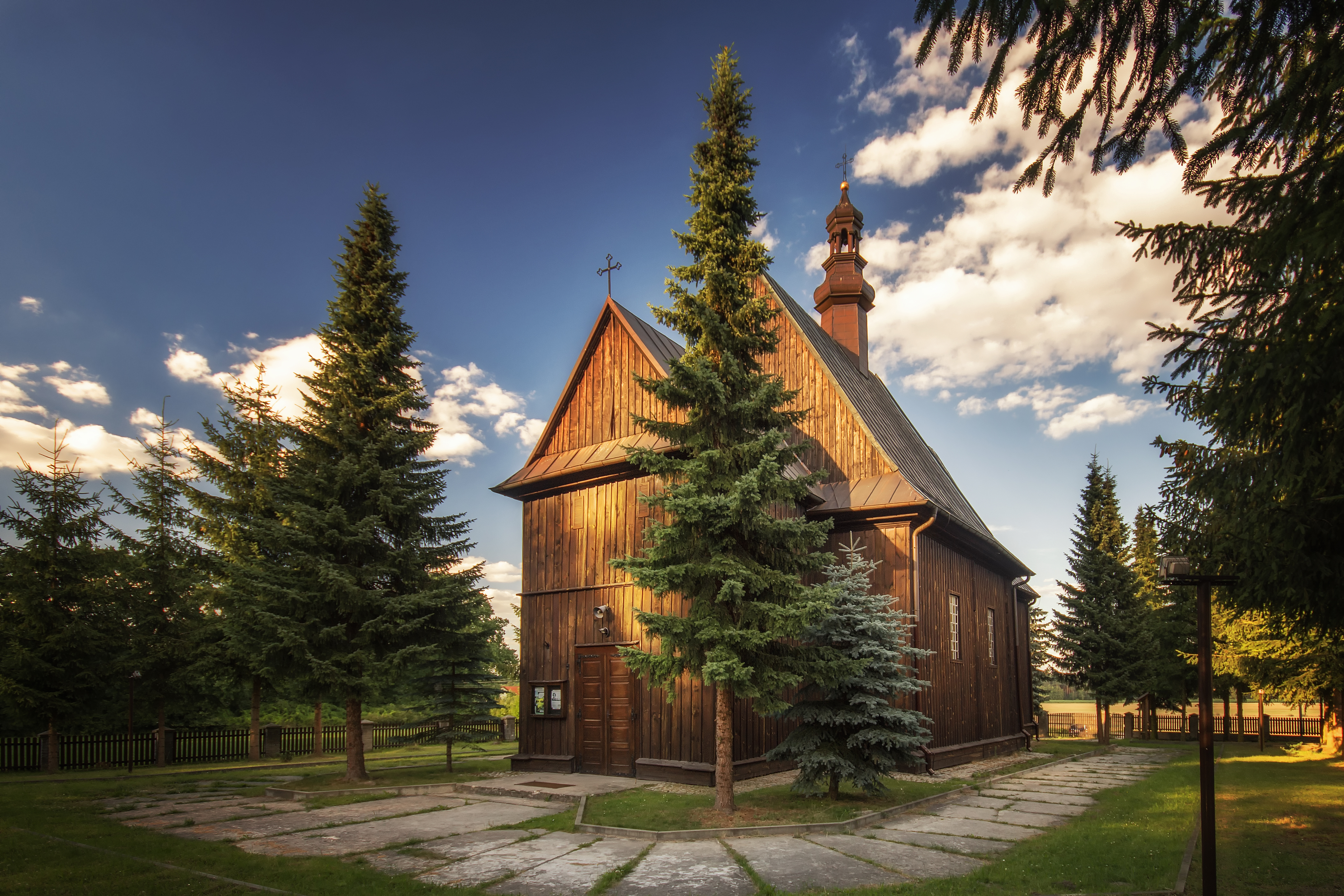
- Catholic church

- Location within Poland
- Coordinates: 50°38′51″N 20°4′42″E
- Country: Poland
- Voivodeship: Świętokrzyskie
- County: Jędrzejów
- Gmina: Nagłowice
- Population: 380

Rakoszyn [raˈkɔʂɨn] is a village in the administrative district of Gmina Nagłowice, within Jędrzejów County, Świętokrzyskie Voivodeship, in south-central Poland. It lies approximately 5 km (3 mi) south-west of Nagłowice, 16 km (10 mi) west of Jędrzejów, and 47 km (29 mi) south-west of the regional capital Kielce.
