= Zdanowice =

- Village
- Location within Poland
- Coordinates: 50°40′5″N 20°10′8″E
- Country: Poland
- Voivodeship: Świętokrzyskie
- County: Jędrzejów
- Gmina: Nagłowice
- Population: 280

Zdanowice [zdanɔˈvit͡sɛ] is a village in the administrative district of Gmina Nagłowice, within Jędrzejów County, Świętokrzyskie Voivodeship, in south-central Poland. It lies approximately 5 km (3 mi) east of Nagłowice, 11 km (7 mi) north-west of Jędrzejów, and 40 km (25 mi) south-west of the regional capital Kielce.
