= Caców =

- Village
- Location within Poland
- Coordinates: 50°42′4″N 20°12′20″E
- Country: Poland
- Voivodeship: Świętokrzyskie
- County: Jędrzejów
- Gmina: Nagłowice
- Population: 120

Caców [ˈt͡sat͡suf] is a village in the administrative district of Gmina Nagłowice, within Jędrzejów County, Świętokrzyskie Voivodeship, in south-central Poland. It lies approximately 8 km (5 mi) east of Nagłowice, 11 km (7 mi) north-west of Jędrzejów, and 36 km (22 mi) south-west of the regional capital Kielce.
