= Zagórze, Jędrzejów County =

Zagórze
- Village
- Location within Poland
- Coordinates: 50°36′N 20°10′E
- Country: Poland
- Voivodeship: Świętokrzyskie
- County: Jędrzejów
- Gmina: Nagłowice

Zagórze [zaˈɡuʐɛ] is a village in the administrative district of Gmina Nagłowice, within Jędrzejów County, Świętokrzyskie Voivodeship, in south-central Poland. It lies approximately 10 km (6 mi) south-east of Nagłowice, 11 km (7 mi) west of Jędrzejów, and 45 km (28 mi) south-west of the regional capital Kielce.
