= Rejowiec =

Rejowiec may refer to the following places:

- Rejowiec, Greater Poland Voivodeship (west-central Poland)
- Rejowiec, Lublin Voivodeship (east Poland)
- Rejowiec, Świętokrzyskie Voivodeship (south-central Poland)
- Rejowiec Fabryczny, Lublin Voivodeship (east Poland)
- Gmina Rejowiec an administrative district in Lublin Voivodeship (east Poland)
- Gmina Rejowiec Fabryczny an administrative district in Lublin Voivodeship (east Poland)
