= Stanisław Bolkowski =

Polish engineer (1930–2023)

- Born: 12 December 1930; Równe, Second Polish Republic
- Died: 14 July 2023 (aged 92)
- Education: Warsaw University of Technology (PhD)
- Known for: Electrical Engineer's Handbook
- Awards: Order of Polonia Restituta, Cross of Merit, Medal of the Commission for National Education, Badge of "Merit for Power Engineering", Badge of "Merit for Communications"
- Scientific career
- Workplaces: Warsaw University of Technology, Bialystok University of Technology, Association of Polish Electrical Engineers
- Thesis: Voltage and current waveforms in a long line with non-linear load (1965)

Stanisław Bolkowski (12 December 1930 – 14 July 2023) was a Polish scientist, professor, engineer, academic teacher, deputy chairman of the Electrotechnical Committee of the Polish Academy of Sciences (1993–1995 and 2003–2019), former president of the Association of Polish Electrical Engineers (1998–2006), author of academic and technical textbooks on electrical engineering, electrician.

== Biography ==
Stanisław Bolkowski was born on 12 December 1930. In 1940, he and his mother were expatriated to Siberia by the NKVD in the Soviet Union, from where, in 1946, he repatriated with his family and moved to Łódź. In 1950, he began his studies at the Faculty of Electrical Engineering of the Warsaw University of Technology, which he completed in 1956 with a master's degree in engineering, specialising in power networks. In 1952, while still a student, he worked as an assistant at the university, and in 1965 he obtained his doctoral degree. In 1971 he became an assistant professor, in 1983 the title of professor, and in 1992 he was appointed full professor.

Bolkowski was associated with the Warsaw University of Technology and since 2002 with the Bialystok University of Technology, among others former Vice-Chancellor of the Warsaw University of Technology (for didactics in 1996–1999, for science in 1999–2002) and Dean of the Faculty of Electrical Engineering at the Warsaw University of Technology (1987–1993). In 2009 he was awarded an honorary doctorate by the Silesian University of Technology.

Bolkowski was a specialist in electrical engineering and a teacher of several generations of Polish electrical engineers. He is one of the co-authors of the "Electrical Engineer's Handbook" ("Poradnik Inżyniera Elektryka").

His merits for the Association of Polish Electrical Engineers (SEP) have been awarded Gold Honorary Badges of SEP and NOT, Mieczysław Pożaryski's Medal, Adam Hoffmann's Medal, Michał Doliwo-Dobrowolski's Medal, Józef Węglarz's Medal, Statuette of Outstanding Teacher, Mentor and Ally of Youth and in 2002 with the highest in the Association dignity of Honorary Member.

For his scientific and didactic activity Professor Bolkowski was awarded: the Order of Polonia Restituta, the Gold Cross of Merit, the Medal of the Commission for National Education, the Gold Badge of Merit for the Warsaw University of Technology, the Gold Badge of "Merit for Power Engineering" and the Honorary Badge of "Merit for Communications".

Bolkowski died on 14 July 2023, at the age of 92.
