= Six-Year Plan =

The Six-Year Plan (1950–1955) was the second centralized plan of the People's Republic of Poland, following the completed Three-Year Plan (1947–1949). It concentrated on increasing the heavy industry sector.

By 1950, the Polish government was dominated by Stalinist hardliners, such as Hilary Minc, and liberal economists responsible for creation of the Three-Year Plan were no longer influencing government policy. The Six-Year Plan, designed to bring the economy of Poland in line with the Soviet economy, concentrated on heavy industrialization, with projects such as Nowa Huta. The plan was accepted by the Sejm on July 21, 1950. Later on, it was modified several times, and never fully completed.

Polish society paid a heavy price for poorly thought-out and rapid industrialization. Living standards were reduced, since investments in other fields, such as construction, were cut. In agriculture, the idea of collectivization was promoted, to the protests of Polish farmers. The plan was fashioned after similar Soviet plans, and was based on certain Soviet-style principles, such as central planning of economy, limiting the so-called Capitalist elements, and close cooperation with other Eastern Bloc nations. New urban districts were built in big cities, attracting residents of overpopulated villages. At the same time, however, the balance between supply and demand deepened, and shortages of basic products were common. As a result, rationing was re-introduced in the early 1950s. One of the main factors determining the weakness of the socialist economy was the phenomenon of hidden unemployment, which means excessive employment in industrial plants in relation to needs. This phenomenon should be considered in two aspects: economic and social.

The only real achievement of the Six-Year Plan was quick development of heavy industry. At the same time, however, other fields of Polish economy, such as services and food industry, remained underdeveloped, as all state funds were directed at construction of shipyards, steel plants, chemical plants and car factories. Among major investments of the plan are:

- Skawina Aluminum Factory,
- development of Oświęcim Chemical Works (formerly Buna Werke),
- development of Zakłady Azotowe Kędzierzyn (formerly IG Farben Heydebreck),
- development of Synthetic Fibres Plant Stilon Gorzów Wielkopolski (formerly IG Farben-Werks Landsberg (Warthe)),
- Shoe Factory at Nowy Targ,
- Lenin Steelworks at Nowa Huta,
- Warsaw Steelworks,
- FSO Warszawa,
- FSC Lublin,
- FSC Star at Starachowice,
- Wierzbica Cement Plant,
- development of Jaworzno Power Station,
- development of Częstochowa Steelworks,
- development of Gdańsk Shipyard (formerly Schichau-Werft and Danziger Werft),
- development of Szczecin Shipyard (formerly AG Vulcan Stettin).
