= Alfons Hoffmann =

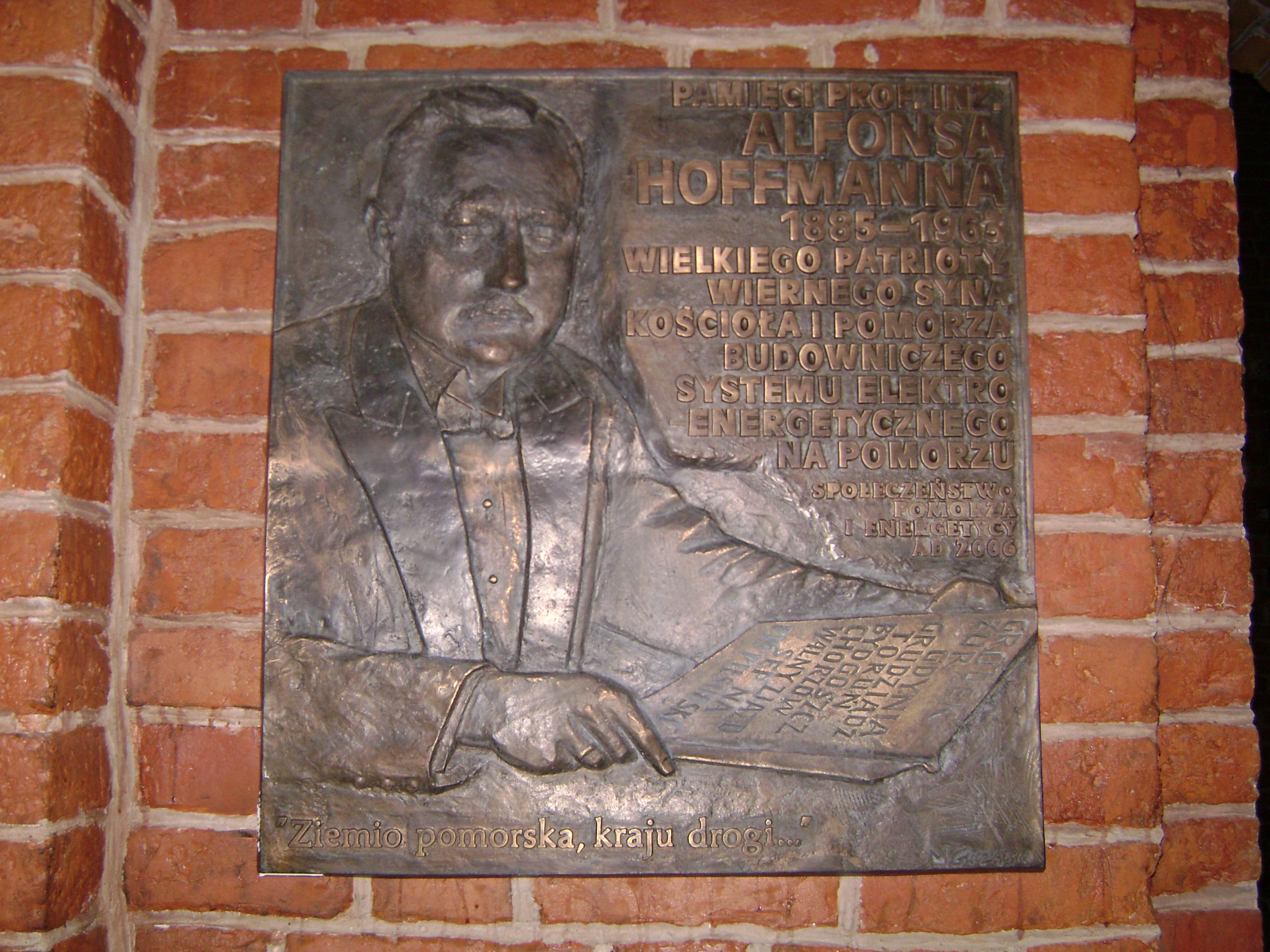
- A comparative plaque for Hoffman in his home town of Grudziądz
- Born: 12 March 1895; Grudziądz, West Prussia, German Empire
- Died: 30 December 1963 (aged 68)
- Resting place: Wrzeszcz, Gdańsk, Poland
- Scientific career
- Fields: Electrical engineering

Professor Alfons Hoffmann (born 12 March 1895 in Grudziądz (Graudenz) - 30 December 1963 in Gdańsk) was a Polish engineer and political activist.

He attended Königliche Technische Hochschule zu Danzig, from 1905 to 1910, earning degrees in mechanical and electrical engineering. After graduating, between 1911–1913 and 1918–1919, Prof. Hoffman worked as an engineer for the Garbe Lahmeyer company in the electric machine laboratory and in the construction department, in Aachen, Westphalia.

Before World War I Hoffman was a prominent member of the Polish intelligentsia in the portion of Poland that was part of the Prussian partition. He was active in social and cultural organizations, including the youth movement Sokół and local choirs. At the end of the war, between 1918 and 1920 he became politically involved and advocated for the return of Pomerania to newly independent Poland.

In 1922 Hoffmann worked out the first plan for the electrification of Province of Pomerania. He is called the father of electrification in the pre-war Poland.

During the Stalinist era, Hoffmann was removed from any position which would have a direct effect on the development of Polish power engineering industry. He became an instructor at the Gdańsk University of Technology in the Engineering Department and was working, from 1950 to 1955, under Prof. Kazimierz Kopecki. Later he joined the Institute of Hydroengineering of the Polish Academy of Sciences, where he became professor in 1957. He was active until his death.

Alfons Hoffmann died on 30 December 1963 and was buried in the Gdańsk-Wrzeszcz cemetery.

== Prof. A. Hoffmann's Medal ==
In 1992, Prof. A. Hoffman's Medal was created by the Association of Polish Electrical Engineers as the Patron of all Polish Power Engineering. To this day, distinguished persons are awarded the Prof. A. Hoffmann's Medal. The criteria for receiving this honor is formally described as persons representing high ethical values, meritorious for the development of national electrical power particularly in the field of projects, scientific research, exploitation and repairs in power engineering, and the building of power industry objects.

Award recipients:

- In 2004 Professor Xose M. Lopez-Fernandez for his activity in promoting the knowledge on Electrical Power Transformer.
- In 2007 Pierre Boss for outstanding merits in the field of the Power Engineering.
