= Czesław Bobrowski =

Polish economist

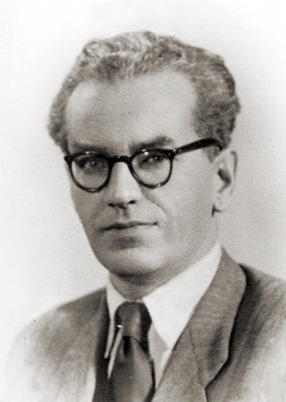
- Czesław Bobrowski
- Born: 17 February 1904; Sarny, Volhynian Governorate, Russian Empire
- Died: 18 May 1996 (aged 92); Warsaw, Poland

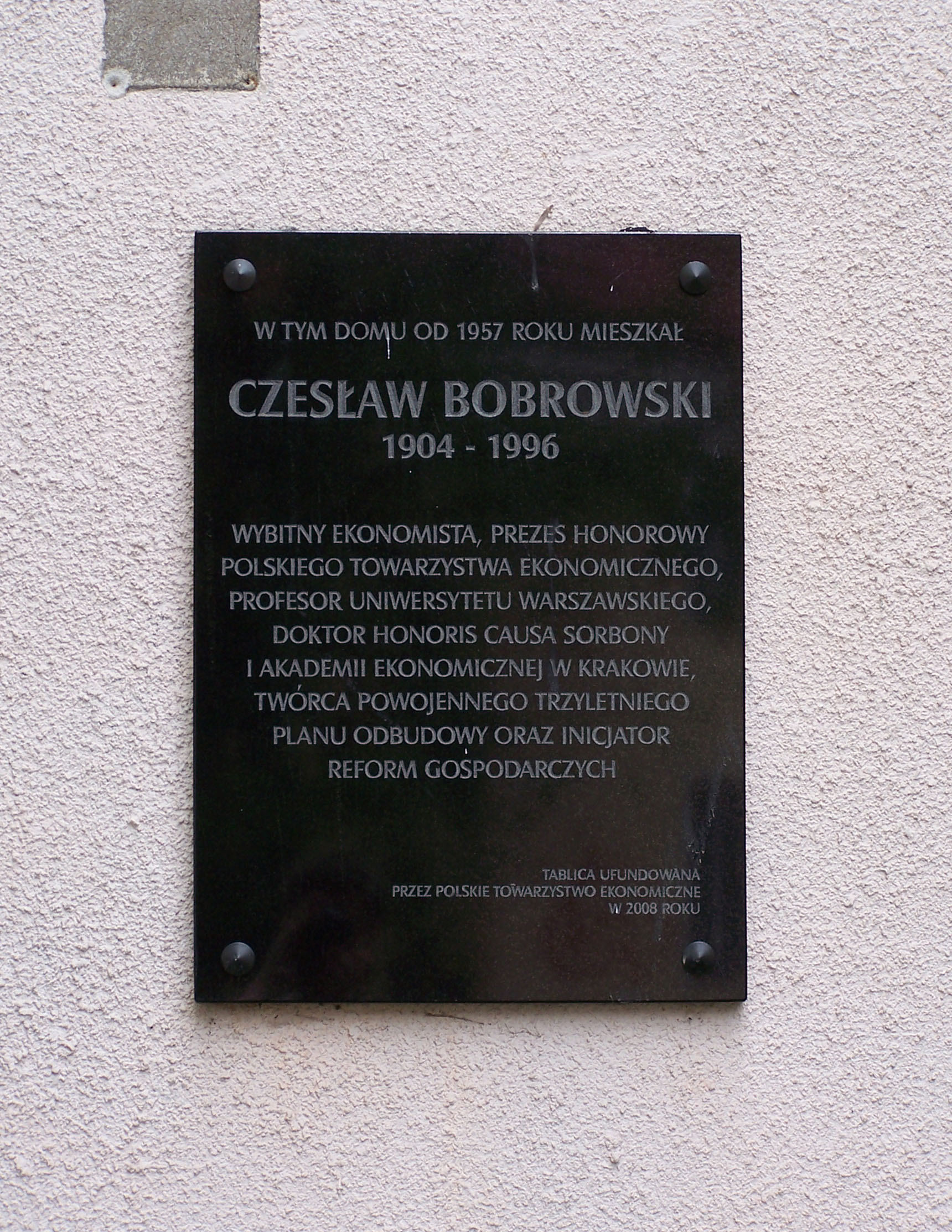
Memorial plaque in Warsaw-Żoliborz

Czesław Bobrowski (17 February 1904, in Sarny – 18 May 1996, in Warsaw) was a Polish economist. In postwar Poland, he was a director of Central Planning Office (Centralny Urząd Planowania) from 1945–1948, author of the Three-Year Plan. He was also a member of the State National Council (1945–1947) and Parliament (1947–1948).

Sidelined by Stalinist hardliners, he returned to politics after the Polish October as vice president of the Economic Committee to the Council of Ministers (1957–1963) and professor of Warsaw University (from 1958). In the 1970s he was a United Nations expert for developing countries (Algeria, Ghana and Syria). Chairman of the Consultant Economy Council from 1981–1987, member of the Counsultant Council to the Head of State from 1986–1990.

He was the author of many academic publications in the realm of economics.

== Early life and education ==
Son of Adolf Korolko-Bobrowski and Jadwiga from Okło-Kułaków originally from the vicinity of Mstsislaw in Belarus. As a volunteer (a senior shooter) he participated in the Polish–Soviet War. Graduate of the gymnasium in Lublin (1921), the Faculty of Law of the University of Warsaw from 1925. In the years 1925–1926 he worked as legal consultant of the Consulate General in Prague. Intern at the Paris School of Political Sciences (Ecole des Sciences Politiques) from 1927.

== Pre war ==
In the period 1927–1929 he worked in the economic department of the Ministry of Industry and Commerce of the republic of Poland (Ministerstwo Przemysłu i Handlu II RP), performing, among others, the function of deputy commissioner of the Polish Trade Association with Russia "Polros". In the years 1931–1932 he was the director of the Soviet-Polish commercial company Sowpoltorg in Moscow, then in the period 1935–1939 the director of the economic department at the Ministry of Agriculture and Rural Development of the republic of Poland. In the 1930s he founded and became the editor-in-chief of the "Gospodarka Narodowa" magazine, gathering a group of young economists around him.

== Second world war ==
After the aggression of the Third Reich and the aggression of the USSR against Poland, together with the ministry's officials, he was evacuated to Romania on 17 September 1939. From there, through Yugoslavia and Italy, he went to France, where in 1940 he joined the Polish Army. After the defeat of France, he was interned in Switzerland. Then he escaped from the internment camp to France, where he began to work first in the Red Cross, then in the Society for the Care of Poles in France. He helped refugees from Poland and was imprisoned in the camps. In 1943, avoiding arrest by the Gestapo, he left occupied France, through Spain and Portugal he reached Gibraltar from where he went to London. In London, in 1944, he found himself in a study group at the Minister of Treasury in the Polish Government in exile, Ludwik Grosfeld. The team developed a program for the reconstruction and development of Poland after war damage and model solutions for the Economy of Poland after the war.

== Post war ==
After the establishment in June 1945 in the implementation of the Yalta Conference of the Provisional Government of National Unity and the withdrawal of international recognition on 6 July 1945 for the Polish Government in exile, in August 1945 Czesław Bobrowski returned to Poland (similarly to Ludwik Grosfeld).

He was co-opted to the State National Council, and on 10 November 1945 was appointed president of the Central Planning Office. He held the function from 1945 to February 1948. In CUP, among others, three-year Economic Reconstruction Plan. In February 1948 removed from office under the pressure of the Polish Workers' Party, Stalinizing the economic policy of the country. In the period from March to December 1948 he was a member of a parliament in Sweden in Stockholm. Summoned to the country, for fear of arrest, he refused to come and went in December 1948 to emigrate to France. From 1952 to 1956 he was a research fellow at the Institute of Political Sciences and the National Center for Scientific Research in Paris (Center Nationale de la Recherche Scientifique).

== Return to Poland ==
After October 1956, he returned to Poland, became a research worker at the University of Warsaw and vice-chairman of the Economic Council of the Council of Ministers (1957–1963). In 1958 he received the title of full professor at the University of Warsaw, from where he left after the events of March 1968. In the period 1967–1971 he was a lecturer at the University of Paris I - La Sorbonne. In the 1970s he was a UN expert advising in Algeria, Ghana, Iraq and Syria. Chairman of the Consultative Economic Council in 1981–1987. A member of the Consultative Council at the Chairman of the Council of State PRL Wojciech Jaruzelski in 1986–1990. Honorary President of the Polish Economic Society in 1986.

== Later life ==
Member of the State National Council (1945–1947) and Legislative Sejm (1947–1948). A member of the Polish Socialist Party (in 1946–1948) he was a member of the general council), then PZPR.

In 1961, together with Zygmunt Bauman, Jan Strzelecki and Jerzy Wiatr, he participated in a discussion devoted to the future of Polish society. Not as a sociologist, educator or psychologist, but as an economist, the greatest danger threatening in our social life, he saw in the gaps of social education, in the erroneous philosophical justifications of human attitudes: the sense of the absurdity of life and the feeling of lack of connection between his own actions and what it meets us, the philosophy of blind destiny is by no means fully overcome.

Author of a number of economic works published in Poland and abroad.

== Publications ==
- Conditions and ways of economic development of the village (1936)
- Social policy on the economic background (1944)
- At the source of socialist planning (1956)
- Socialist Yugoslavia (1957)
- Models of the socialist economy (1957)
- Economic planning. Basic problems (1965)
- On mixed economy in Third World countries (1967)
- Sources, problems and trends in the transformation of economic planning (1981)
- Memories from the century (1985)

== Medals ==
Decorated, among others Gold Cross of Merit with Swords, Medal of Victory and Freedom 1945, Commander's Cross of the Order of Polonia Restituta (1946), Commander's Cross with the Star of the Order of the White Lion (Czechoslovakia), Commander's Cross with the OOP Star and the Order of Polish People's Builders.

== See also ==
- List of Poles
- Michał Kalecki
- Leszek Balcerowicz
