= Wincenty Pstrowski =

Polish miner awarded for his high production in the communist era

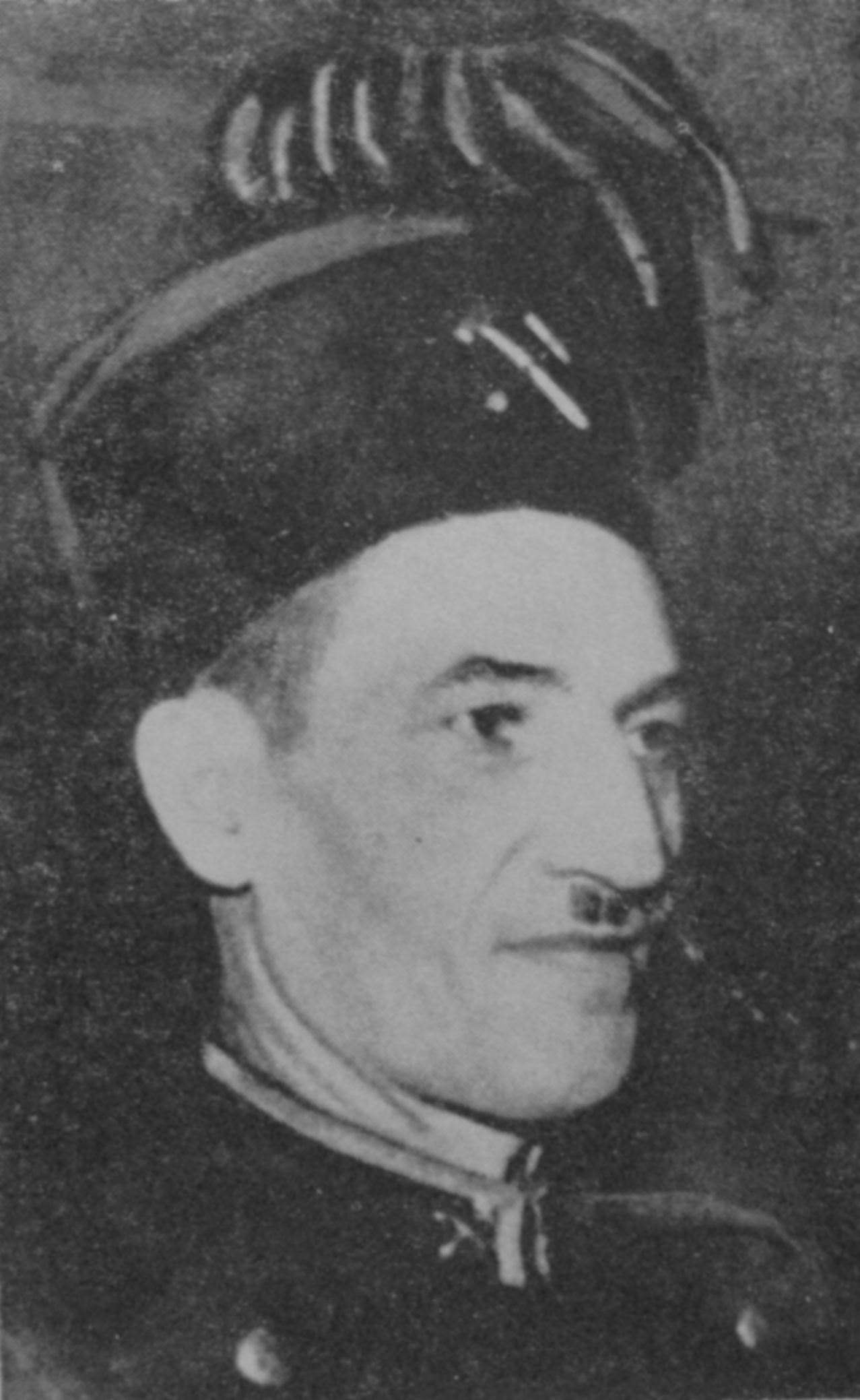
- Pstrowski
- Born: 28 May 1904; Deszno, Świętokrzyskie Voivodeship
- Died: 18 April 1948 (aged 43); Krakow
- Occupation: Miner
- Known for: Productivity

Wincenty Pstrowski (28 May 1904 – 18 April 1948) was a Polish miner, known as the Polish Stakhanov and recognized with awards for his high productivity, during the Three Year Plan.

Pstrowski was given the title of przodownik pracy when in 1947 he achieved 270 percent expected efficiency per month. Pstrowski died in 1948 due to misconducted dental intervention, but in official propaganda, his death was due to deadly exhaustion.

== See also ==
- Piotr Ożański

== Bibliography ==
- Nazwy do zmiany / ul. Pstrowskiego Wincentego stronie IPN
