= Ludwik de Laveaux (officer) =

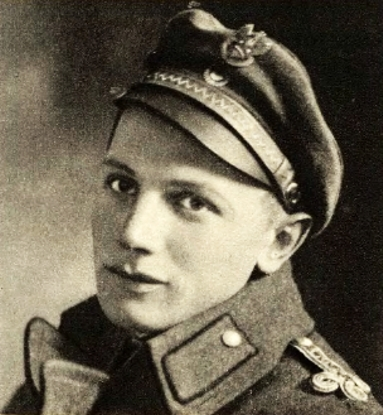
Ludwig de Laveaux in 1918

Ludwik de Laveaux was a brigadier general of the Polish Army who served in World War I, World War II and the Polish–Soviet War.

He was born on 18 June 1891 in Frysztakua a relative of the painter, Ludwik de Laveaux. He graduated in 1911 from Krakow University, and then studied architecture at the Technical University of Lwów.

In World War I he served in the Polish legions 1 and 4 in the Lvov region. Starting as a private soldier he was made an officer on 1 April 1916, and in 1917 took command of the city Defense Command where they took the main train station in Lviv between 3–4 November 1918. After the war he was assistant to Chief Executive lomendanta Czesław Mączyński in the peace negotiations.

From June to December 1919 he was a student at the military general staff School Course in Warsaw, but his studies were interrupted by the Polish-Soviet War where he was Chief of staff of the 5th Infantry Division but he resumed his studies from 1921 to 1922 at Doszkolenia Military School in Warsaw.

After graduating he was then assigned to the 1st Division as Chief of staff. In December 1926 he transferred to Warsaw, and in July 1929 he took command of the 2nd Infantry Regiment in Sandomierz.

In January 1936, he was appointed Pułkownik (commander) of the 8th Infantry Division in Modlin, where he was stationed at the outbreak of World War II.

In 1939, de Laveaux fought in the area around Modlin. His division also served in the Warsaw Uprising; his son and daughter survived the Warsaw Uprising, in which they fought.

In 1966, August Zaleski promoted de Laveaux to the rank of Brigadier General. After the war the family moved to live in England where he died on 16 December 1969 in London. He is buried in the cemetery of South Ealing.

== Honours ==
- Silver Cross of the Virtuti Militari
- Officer's Cross Of The Order Of The Rebirth Of Poland
- Cross of independence (with swords)
- Cross of Valor (4 times)
- Gold cross of merit (2 times)
- Honorary citizen of the city of Sandomierz (1936)
