= Rejowiec, Świętokrzyskie Voivodeship =

Rejowiec
- Village
- Location within Poland
- Coordinates: 50°41′15″N 20°5′43″E
- Country: Poland
- Voivodeship: Świętokrzyskie
- County: Jędrzejów
- Gmina: Nagłowice

Rejowiec (Polish pronunciation: [rɛˈjɔvjɛt͡s]) is a village in the administrative district of Gmina Nagłowice, within Jędrzejów County, Świętokrzyskie Voivodeship, in south-central Poland. It lies approximately 2 km (1 mi) north-west of Nagłowice, 16 km (10 mi) north-west of Jędrzejów, and 43 km (27 mi) south-west of the regional capital Kielce.
