= Jaronowice =

- Village
- Location within Poland
- Coordinates: 50°39′18″N 20°1′45″E
- Country: Poland
- Voivodeship: Świętokrzyskie
- County: Jędrzejów
- Gmina: Nagłowice

Jaronowice [jarɔnɔˈvit͡sɛ] is a village in the administrative district of Gmina Nagłowice, within Jędrzejów County, Świętokrzyskie Voivodeship, in south-central Poland. It lies approximately 7 km (4 mi) south-west of Nagłowice, 20 km (12 mi) west of Jędrzejów, and 49 km (30 mi) south-west of the regional capital Kielce.
