= Ślęcin =

- Village
- Location within Poland
- Coordinates: 50°40′4″N 20°4′49″E
- Country: Poland
- Voivodeship: Świętokrzyskie
- County: Jędrzejów
- Gmina: Nagłowice
- Population: 420

Ślęcin [ˈɕlɛnt͡ɕin] is a village in the administrative district of Gmina Nagłowice, within Jędrzejów County, Świętokrzyskie Voivodeship, in south-central Poland. It lies approximately 3 km (2 mi) south-west of Nagłowice, 16 km (10 mi) west of Jędrzejów, and 45 km (28 mi) south-west of the regional capital Kielce.
