= Gmina Nagłowice =

Gmina Nagłowice Nagłowice Commune
- Gmina
- Coat of arms
- Interactive map of Gmina Nagłowice
- Coordinates (Nagłowice): 50°40′45″N 20°6′24″E
- Country: Poland
- Voivodeship: Świętokrzyskie
- County: Jędrzejów
- Seat: Nagłowice

Area
  - Total: 117.3 km^{2} (45.3 sq mi)

Population (2006)
  - Total: 5,290
  - Density: 45.1/km^{2} (117/sq mi)
- Website: http://www.ug-naglowice.webpark.pl

Gmina Nagłowice is a rural gmina (administrative district) in Jędrzejów County, Świętokrzyskie Voivodeship, in south-central Poland. Its seat is the village of Nagłowice, which lies approximately 15 kilometres (9 mi) west of Jędrzejów and 43 km (27 mi) south-west of the regional capital Kielce.

The gmina covers an area of 117.3 square kilometres (45.3 sq mi), and as of 2006 its total population is 5,290.

== Villages ==
Gmina Nagłowice contains the villages and settlements of Brynica Mokra, Caców, Chycza-Brzóstki, Cierno-Żabieniec, Deszno, Jaronowice, Kuźnice, Nagłowice, Rakoszyn, Rejowiec, Ślęcin, Trzciniec, Warzyn Drugi, Warzyn Pierwszy, Zagórze and Zdanowice.

== Neighbouring gminas ==
Gmina Nagłowice is bordered by the gminas of Jędrzejów, Moskorzew, Oksa, Radków, Sędziszów and Słupia.
