= Ludwik de Laveaux (painter) =

Polish painter

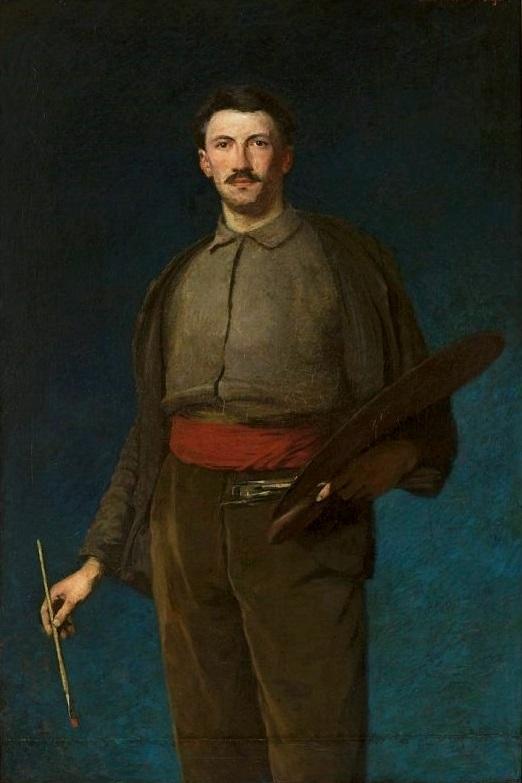
self portrait, 1892

Stanisław Ludwik de Laveaux (21 November 1868 – 5 April 1894) was a Polish painter.

Born in Jaronowice, he came from a French Protestant family who had emigrated to Poland in the 18th century.

He studied at the Kraków School of fine arts from 1884 to 1890 under Józef Mehoffer, and for two years he studied painting at the Academy of Fine Arts, Munich under Otto Seitz. He then went to Paris on a permanent basis, but he travelled to Brittany, London and Oxford. Often living in poverty contributed to his development of tuberculosis, of which he died at the age of 25 years. Known for his many romances, the most famous of which was his affair with a count's daughter Iwona Prośnieńska from the town of Olkusz. He also had a fiancee, Maria Mikołajczykówna.

He died on 5 April 1894 in Paris and was buried at the Cimetière parisien de Pantin (plot 2, range 11, nr. 2).

== Gallery ==
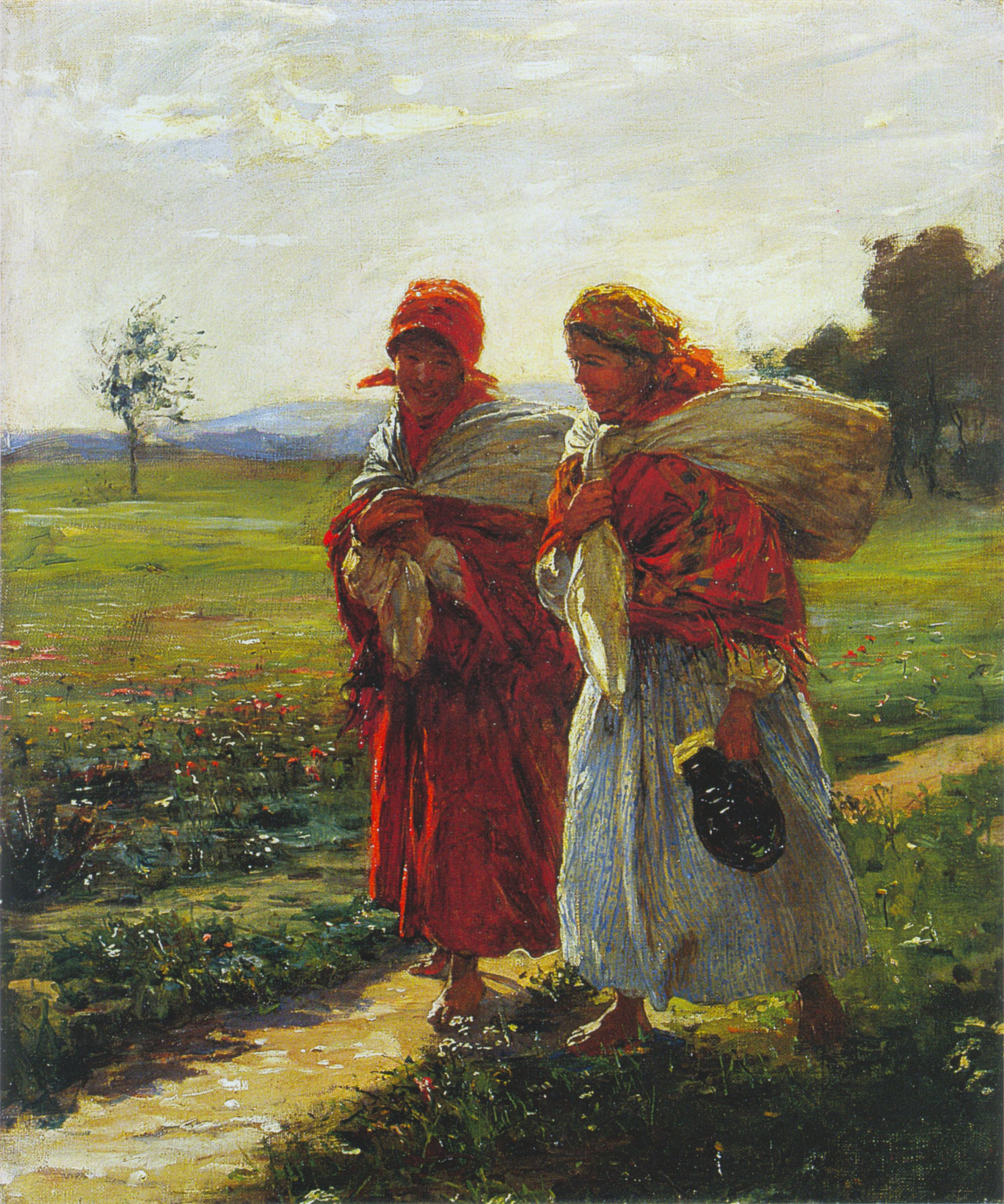
Do miasta (To Town)

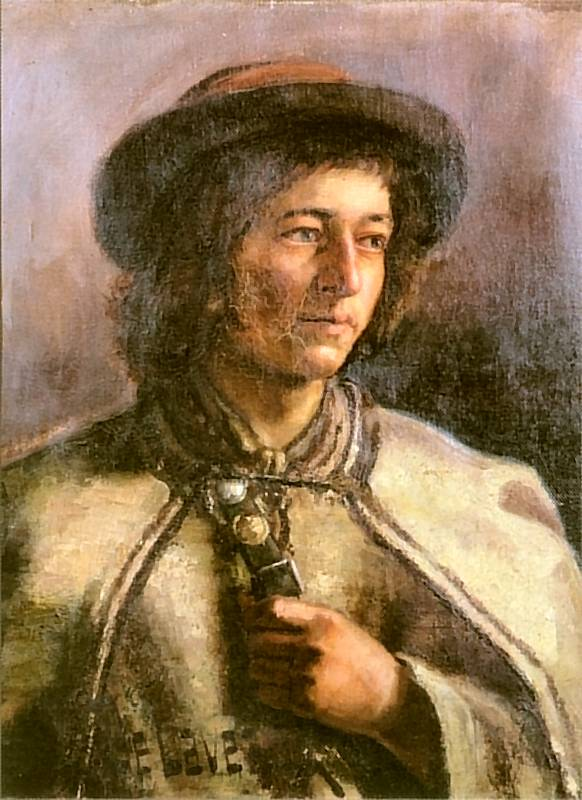
Góralczyk

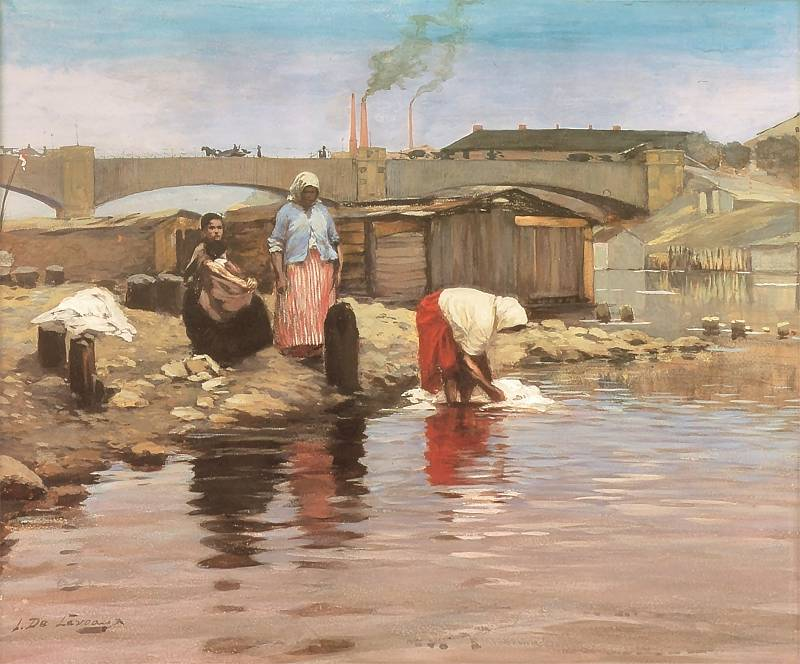
Praczki

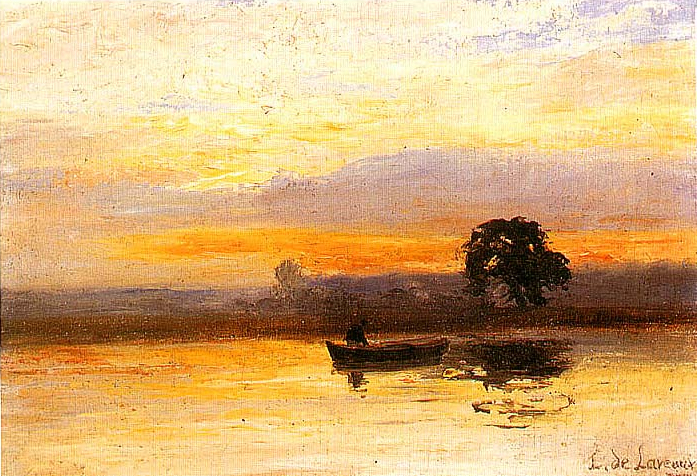
W zachodzącym słońcu

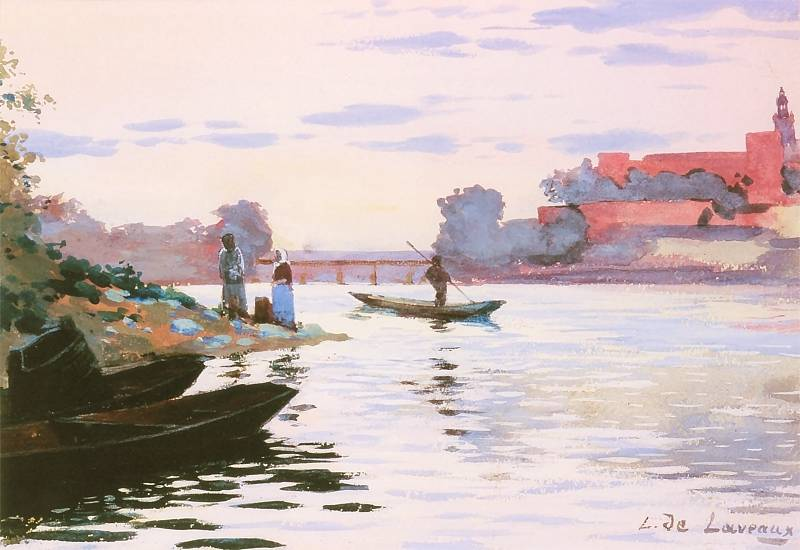
Wisła pod Dębnikami

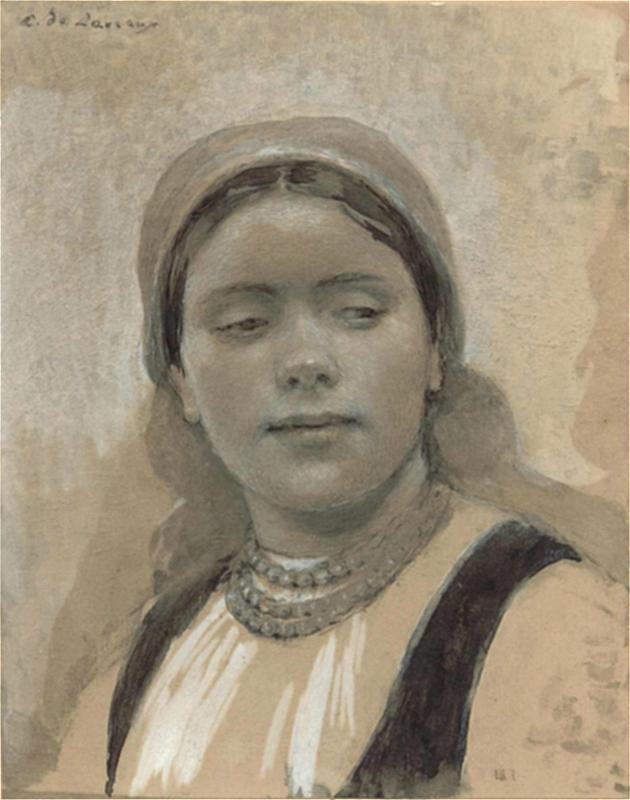
Dziewczyna z Bronowic

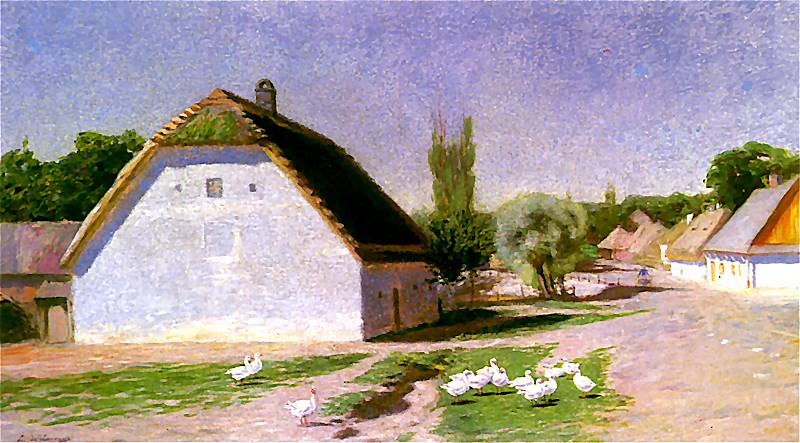
Lato w Bronowicach

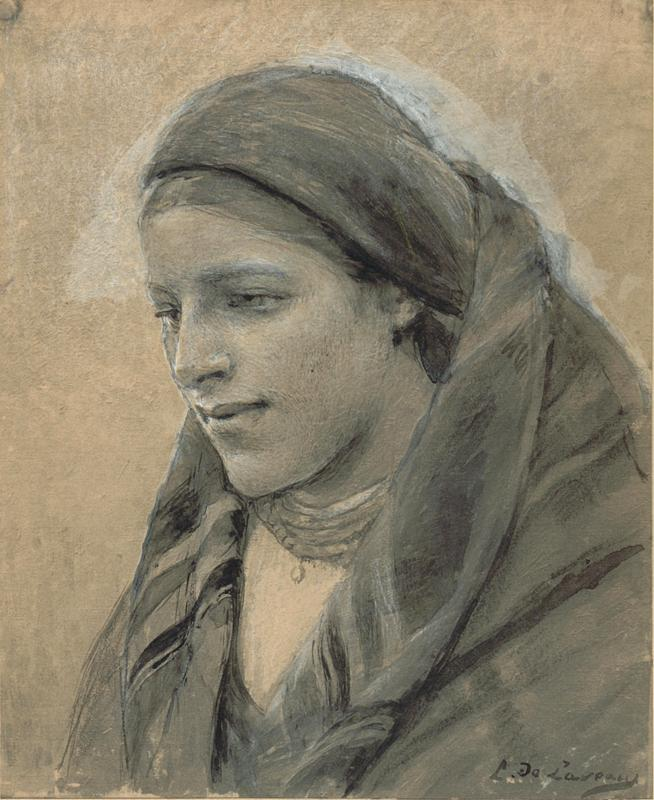
Marysia
