= Association of Polish Electrical Engineers =

- Stowarzyszenie Elektryków Polskich
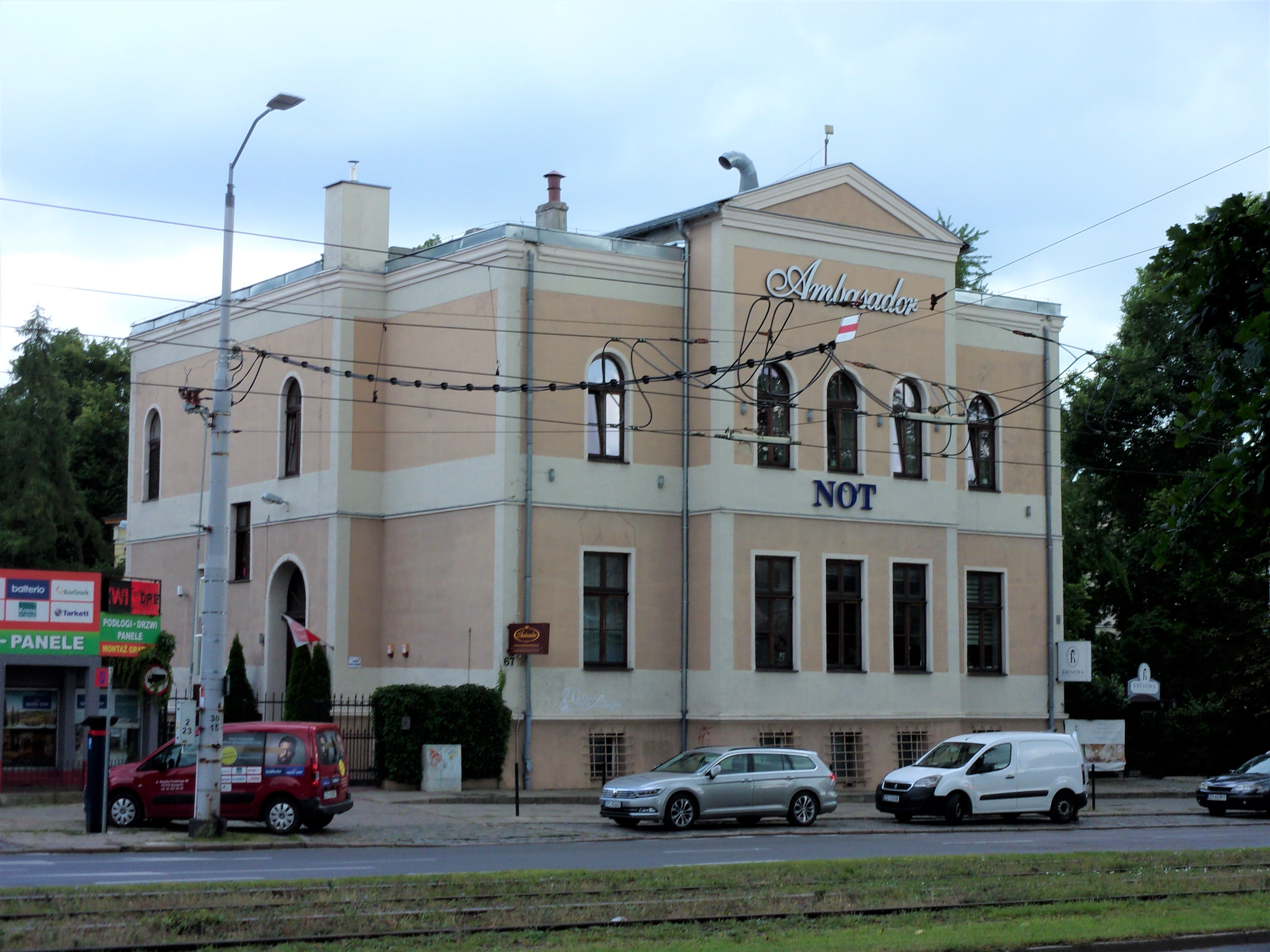
- Szczecin branch of the association
- Abbreviation: SEP
- Pronunciation: [ˌstɔvaʒɨˈʃɛ̃ɲɛ ɛˈlɛktrɨkuf pɔlsʲcix]
- Formation: 1919; 107 years ago
- Type: NGO
- Legal status: association
- Headquarters: 14 Świętokrzyska Street, 00-050
- Location: Warsaw, Poland
- Coordinates: 52.236583°N 21.014056°E
- Products: education, appraisals
- Fields: electrical engineering
- Official language: Polish
- Secretary General: Jacek Nowicki
- President: Sławomir Cieślik
- Main organ: main board
- Website: sep.com.pl

The Association of Polish Electrical Engineers (Stowarzyszenie Elektryków Polskich, SEP; also called Association of Polish Electricians) is a Polish non-governmental organisation integrating the community of electricians of Polish origin worldwide. The organisation brings together both engineers and technicians, as well as young students (pupils of technical and vocational schools) in electrical engineering in the broadest sense.

== Activities ==
SEP is mainly involved in education activities (training courses for the operation of electrical equipment). It is also involved in conformity assessment of low-voltage electrical products (since 1933), through its office of quality, an SEP agency with national accreditations and recognition from the most prestigious international and European organisations. It also carries out extensive international cooperation under the English name of "Association of Polish Electrical Engineers". It is a member of the National Federation of Scientific and Technical Associations of Poland and the European organisation EUREL.

== History ==
From 7 to 9 June 1919, a congress was held to establish the Association of Polish Electrical Engineers. Professor Mieczysław Pożaryski was elected its first president. In 1928 the organisation merged with the Association of Polish Radio Engineers, and in 1929 the name was changed to its present name by a decision of the board of directors. In 1939, the Association of Polish Telecommunication Engineers joined SEP.

== Presidents ==
- 1919–1928 – Mieczysław Pożaryski (first president of the SEP)
- 1928–1929 – Kazimierz Straszewski
- 1929–1930 – Zygmunt Okoniewski
- 1930–1931 – Kazimierz Straszewski
- 1931–1932 – Felicjan Karśnicki
- 1932–1933 – Tadeusz Czaplicki
- 1933–1934 – Alfons Kühn
- 1934–1935 – Jan Obrąpalski
- 1935–1936 – Alfons Kühn
- 1936–1937 – Janusz Groszkowski
- 1937–1938 – Alfons Hoffmann
- 1938–1939 – Kazimierz Szpotański
- 1939 – Antoni Krzyczkowski
- 1939–1946 – Kazimierz Szpotański
- 1946–1947 – Kazimierz Straszewski
- 1947–1949 – Włodzimierz Szumilin
- 1949–1950 – Stanisław Ignatowicz
- 1950–1951 – Tadeusz Żarnecki
- 1951–1952 – Jerzy Lando
- 1952–1959 – Kazimierz Kolbiński
- 1959–1961 – Tadeusz Kahl
- 1961–1981 – Tadeusz Dryzek
- 1981–1987 – Jacek Szpotański
- 1987–1990 – Bohdan Paszkowski
- 1990–1994 – Jacek Szpotański
- 1994–1998 – Cyprian Brudkowski
- 1998–2002 – Stanisław Bolkowski
- 2002–2006 – Stanisław Bolkowski
- 2006–2014 – Jerzy Barglik
- 2014–2022 – Piotr Szymczak
- from 2022 – Sławomir Cieślik
