= Hilary Minc =

Polish economist and politician (1905–1974)

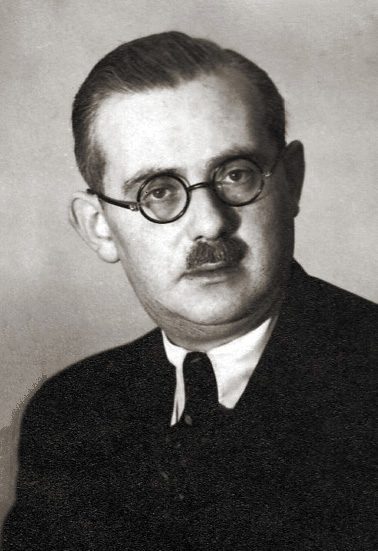
- Hilary Minc in 1949.

Deputy Prime Minister of Poland
- In office 20 April 1949 – 10 October 1956
- Prime Minister: Józef Cyrankiewicz (1949–1952, 1954–1956); Bolesław Bierut (1952–1954)

Chairman of the State Economic Planning Commission
- In office 20 April 1949 – 18 March 1954
- Prime Minister: Józef Cyrankiewicz (1949–1952); Bolesław Bierut (1952–1954)
- Preceded by: Tadeusz Dietrich
- Succeeded by: Eugeniusz Szyr

Minister of Industry and Trade
- In office 31 March 1947 – 16 February 1949
- Prime Minister: Józef Cyrankiewicz
- Preceded by: Himself (as Minister of Industry)
- Succeeded by: Tadeusz Dietrich

Minister of Industry
- In office 11 December 1944 – 31 March 1947
- Prime Minister: Edward Osóbka-Morawski (1944–1947); Józef Cyrankiewicz (1947)
- Preceded by: Jan Kwapiński (as Minister of Industry, Trade and Shipping of the Polish government-in-exile)
- Succeeded by: Himself (as Minister of Industry and Trade)

Personal details
- Born: 24 August 1905 Kazimierz Dolny, Congress Poland, Russian Empire
- Died: 26 November 1974 (aged 69) Warsaw, Polish People's Republic
- Resting place: Powązki Military Cemetery
- Party: Communist Party of Poland (1921–1938); Polish Workers' Party (1942–1948); Polish United Workers' Party (1948–1959)
- Profession: Economist

Hilary Minc (24 August 1905 – 26 November 1974) was a Polish economist and communist politician prominent during Stalinist Poland.

Minc was born into a middle class Jewish family; his parents were Oskar Minc and Stefania née Fajersztajn. In 1921 Minc joined the Communist Party of Poland, which was later eliminated by the Comintern before World War II. He studied law and economics in Poland and France, where he obtained a doctorate before being expelled by the authorities in 1928.

During World War II he was exiled in the Soviet Union, where he participated in the founding and activities of the Union of Polish Patriots. As an officer in the Polish People's Army, he fought on the Eastern Front and received military decorations, including the Virtuti Militari. Between 1944 and 1956, he was a member of the Politburo of the Polish Workers' Party (PPR) and then the Polish United Workers' Party (PZPR).

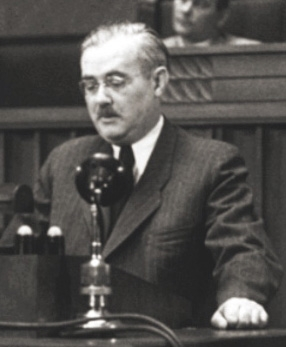
Hilary Minc giving a speech, 1950

Minc was a top-ranking member of Bolesław Bierut's political apparatus from 1948, together with Jakub Berman. He served as minister of industry and commerce and deputy prime minister for economic affairs during the Stalinist period in the Polish People's Republic (until 1956). Although his main responsibility was economy, he was a willing participant in political repressions of this period. Minc participated in Władysław Gomułka's meetings with Joseph Stalin at the Kremlin. Stalin personally assigned Minc first to the Ministry of Industry and then to the Ministry of Transportation of Poland in 1949. Minc was one of the main architects of Poland's Six-Year Plan, implemented in 1950. His wife, Julia Minc, was editor-in-chief of the Polish Press Agency until 1954.

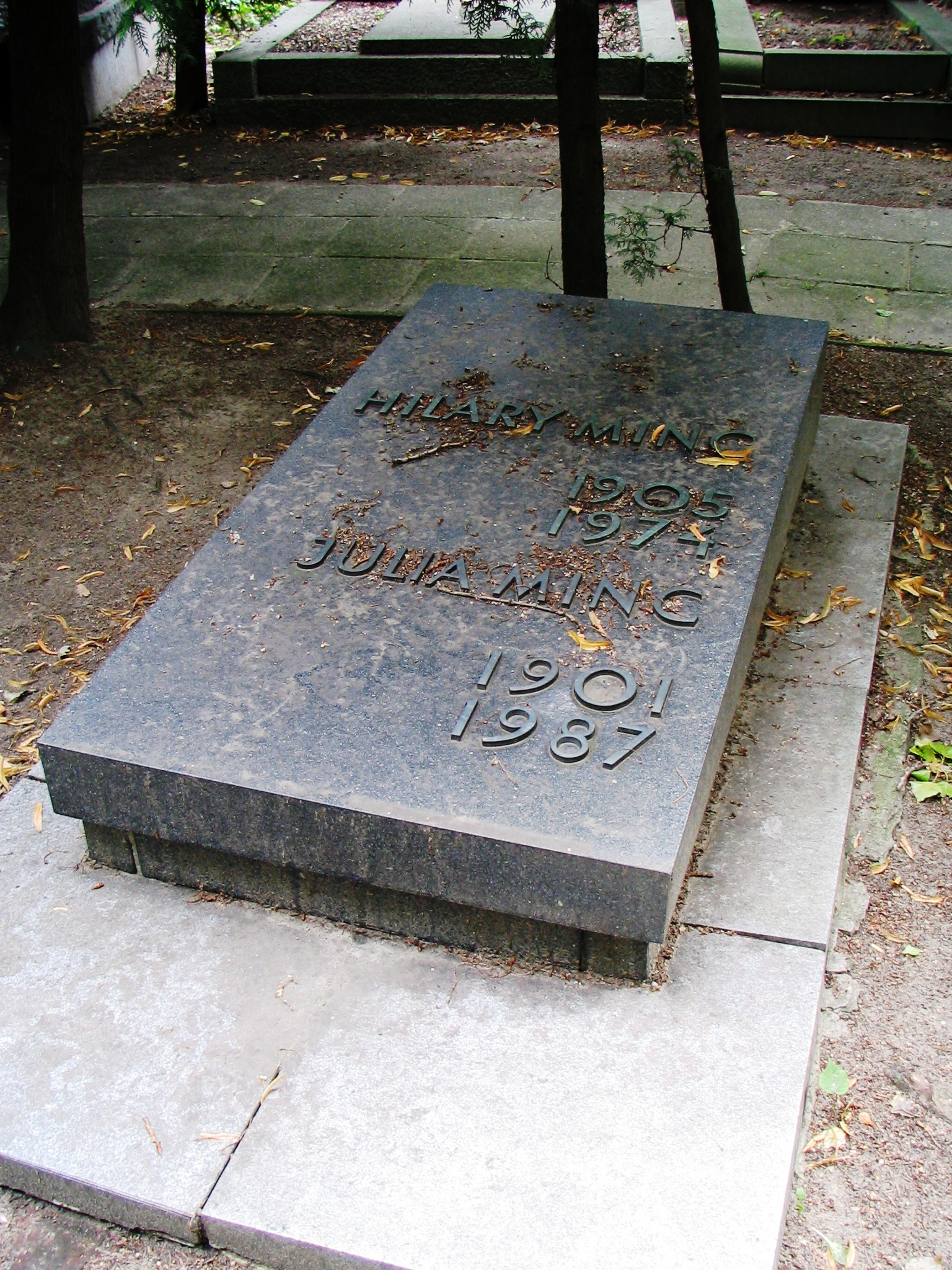
The grave of Hilary Minc and his wife Julia at the Powązki Military Cemetery in Warsaw

At a celebration in Wrocław for the Recovered Territories, Minc acclaimed the regaining of land, including its remaining German population, and proclaimed his government's right to remove the remaining Germans by appropriate methods.

In 1956, during the Polish October, Minc was removed from the Politburo as well as from his position as Deputy Prime Minister. In 1959 he was expelled from PZPR altogether. He died in 1974 and was buried with full military and party honors at Powązki Military Cemetery.

== Awards and decorations ==
- Order of the Builders of People's Poland (1954)
- Order of the Banner of Labour, 1st Class (1955)
- Commander's Cross with Star of the Order of Polonia Restituta (19 July 1946)
- Order of the Cross of Grunwald, 2nd Class (3 January 1945)
- Silver Cross of Virtuti Militari
- Silver Medal For Merit on the Field of Glory
- Medal for Warsaw 1939–1945 (17 January 1946)
- Grand Cross of Order of the White Lion (Czechoslovakia, 1947)
- Commander Grand Cross of the Order of the Lion of Finland (Finland, 1948)
- Order of 9 September 1944, 1st Class (Bulgaria, 1948)
- Order of the Patriotic War, 2nd Class (USSR)
