= Nagłowice =

- Village
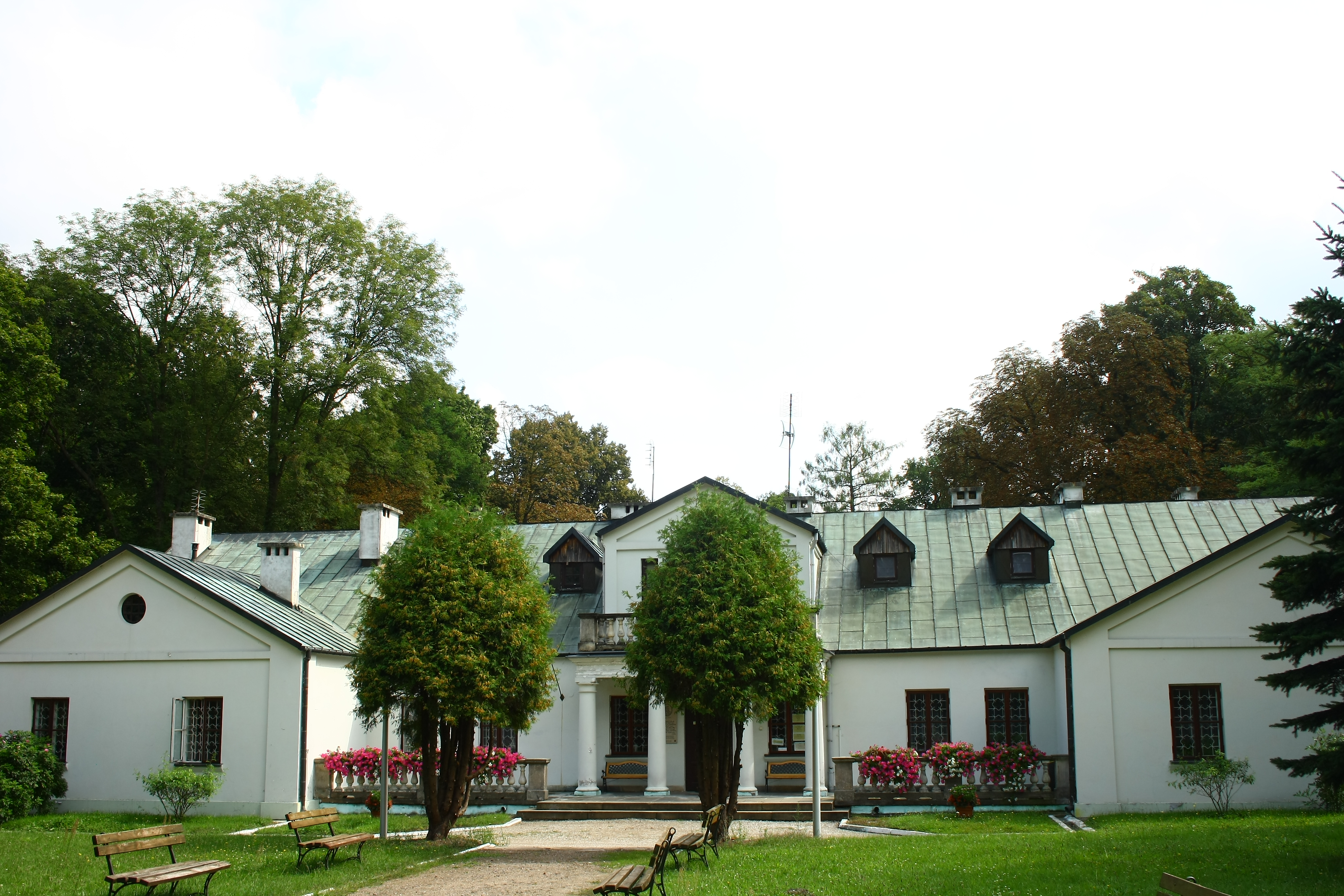
- Manor house

- Coat of arms

- Location within Poland
- Coordinates: 50°40′45″N 20°6′24″E
- Country: Poland
- Voivodeship: Świętokrzyskie
- County: Jędrzejów
- Gmina: Nagłowice
- Population: 950

Nagłowice [naɡwɔˈvit͡sɛ] is a village in Jędrzejów County, Świętokrzyskie Voivodeship, in south-central Poland. It is the seat of the gmina (administrative district) called Gmina Nagłowice. It lies approximately 15 km (9 mi) west of Jędrzejów and 43 km (27 mi) south-west of the regional capital Kielce.

Mikołaj Rej (1505–1569), the father of Polish literature, lived in the village.
