= History of Poland (1939–1945) =

The history of Poland from 1939 to 1945 encompasses primarily the period from the invasion of Poland by Nazi Germany and the Soviet Union to the end of World War II. Following the German–Soviet non-aggression pact, Poland was invaded by Nazi Germany on 1 September 1939 and by the Soviet Union on 17 September. The campaigns ended in early October with Germany and the Soviet Union dividing and annexing the whole of Poland. After the Axis attack on the Soviet Union in the summer of 1941, the entirety of Poland was occupied by Germany, which proceeded to advance its racial and genocidal policies across Poland.

Under the two occupations, Polish citizens suffered enormous human and material losses. According to the Institute of National Remembrance estimates, about 5.6 million Polish citizens died due to the German occupation and about 150,000 due to the Soviet occupation. The Jews were singled out by the Germans for a quick and total annihilation and about 90 percent of Polish Jews (nearly three million) were murdered as part of the Holocaust. Jews, Poles, Romani people and prisoners of many other ethnicities were killed en masse at Nazi extermination camps, such as Auschwitz, Treblinka and Sobibór. Ethnic Poles were subjected to both Nazi German and Soviet persecution. The Germans killed an estimated two million ethnic Poles. Generalplan Ost contemplated turning the remaining majority of Poles into slave labor and annihilating those perceived as "undesirable". Ethnic cleansing and massacres of Poles and to a lesser extent Ukrainians were perpetrated in western Ukraine (prewar Polish Kresy) from 1943. The Ukrainian Insurgent Army participated.

In September 1939, the Polish government officials sought refuge in Romania, but their subsequent internment there prevented the intended continuation abroad as the government of Poland. General Władysław Sikorski, a former prime minister, arrived in France, where a replacement Polish Government-in-Exile was soon formed. After the fall of France, the government was evacuated to Britain. The Polish armed forces were reconstituted and fought alongside the Western Allies in France, Britain and elsewhere. A Resistance movement began organizing in Poland in 1939, soon after the invasions. Its largest military component was a part of the Polish Underground State network and became known as the Home Army. The whole clandestine structure was formally directed by the Government-in-Exile through its delegation resident in Poland. There were also peasant, right-wing, leftist, Jewish and Soviet partisan organizations. Among the failed anti-German uprisings were the Warsaw Ghetto Uprising and the Warsaw Uprising. The aim of the Warsaw Uprising was to prevent domination of Poland by the Soviet Union.

In order to cooperate with the Soviet Union after Operation Barbarossa, Sikorski, an important war ally of the West, negotiated in Moscow with Joseph Stalin and they agreed to form a Polish army in the Soviet Union, intended to fight on the Eastern Front alongside the Soviets. The "Anders' Army" was instead taken to the Middle East in 1942 and then to Italy. Further efforts to continue the Polish-Soviet cooperation had failed because of disagreements over borders, the discovery of the Katyn massacre of Polish POWs perpetrated by the Soviets, and the death of General Sikorski. Afterwards, in a process seen by many Poles as a Western betrayal, the Polish Government-in-Exile gradually ceased being a recognized partner in the Allied coalition.

Stalin pursued a strategy of facilitating the formation of a Polish government independent of (and in opposition to) the exile government in London by empowering the Polish communists. Among Polish communist organizations established during the war were the Polish Workers' Party in occupied Poland and the Union of Polish Patriots in Moscow. In late 1943 a new Polish army was formed in the Soviet Union to fight together with the Soviets. At the same time Stalin worked on co-opting the Western Allies (the United States led by President Franklin D. Roosevelt and the United Kingdom led by Prime Minister Winston Churchill), who, in terms of practical implementations, conformed to Stalin's views on Poland's borders and future government. The fate of Poland was determined in a series of negotiations that included the conferences in Tehran, Yalta, and Potsdam. In 1944, the Polish Government-in-Exile approved and the underground in Poland undertook unilateral political and military actions aimed at establishing an independent Polish authority, but the efforts were thwarted by the Soviets. The Polish communists founded the State National Council in 1943/44 in occupied Warsaw and the Polish Committee of National Liberation in July 1944 in Lublin, after the arrival of the Soviet army. The Soviet Union kept the eastern half of prewar Poland, granting Poland instead the greater southern portion of the eliminated German East Prussia and shifting the country west to the Oder–Neisse line, at the expense of Germany.

== Before the war ==
=== Rearmament and first annexations ===
After the death of Józef Piłsudski in 1935, the Sanation government of his political followers, along with President Ignacy Mościcki, embarked on a military reform and rearmament of the Polish Army in the face of the changing political climate in Europe. Thanks in part to a financial loan from France, Poland's new Central Industrial Region participated in the project from 1936 in an attempt to catch-up with the advanced weapons development by Poland's richer neighbors. Foreign Minister Józef Beck continued to resist the growing pressure on Poland from the West to cooperate with the Soviet Union in order to contain Germany. Against the rapidly growing German military force, Poland not only possessed no comparable quantity of technical resources, but also lacked the knowledge and concepts of developing modern warfare.

Also in 1935, Adolf Hitler announced and expanded the hitherto secret German rearmament contrary to the provisions of the Treaty of Versailles – the foundation of the post-World War I international order. Unable to prevent Hitler's remilitarization of the Rhineland, the United Kingdom and France also pursued rearmament. Meanwhile, German territorial expansion into central Europe began in earnest with the Anschluss of Austria in March 1938. Poland dispatched special diversionary groups to the disputed Zaolzie (Czech Silesia) area in hope of expediting the breakup of Czechoslovakia and regaining the territory. The Munich Agreement of 30 September 1938 was followed by Germany's incorporation of the Sudetenland. Faced with the threat of a total annexation of Czechoslovakia, the Western Powers endorsed the German partition of the country.

Poland insistently sought a great power status but was not invited to participate in the Munich conference. Minister Beck, disappointed with the lack of recognition, issued an ultimatum on the day of the Munich Agreement to the government of Czechoslovakia, demanding an immediate return to Poland of the contested Zaolzie border region. The distressed Czechoslovak government complied, and Polish military units took over the area. The move was negatively received in both the West and the Soviet Union, and it contributed to the worsening of the geopolitical situation of Poland. In November, the Polish government also annexed a small border region in dispute with the newly autonomous state of Slovakia and gave its support to Hungary's expansion into Carpatho-Ukraine, located within the now federal Czechoslovakia.

=== Aftermath of the Munich Agreement ===
The Munich Agreement of 1938 did not last for long. In March 1939 the German occupation of Czechoslovakia began with the invasion of Bohemia and Moravia, leaving Slovakia as a German puppet state. Lithuania was forced to give up its Klaipėda Region (Memelland). Formal demands were made for the return of the Free City of Danzig to Germany, even though its status was guaranteed by the League of Nations. In early 1939 Hitler proposed Poland an alliance on German terms, with an expectation of compliance. The Polish government would have to agree to Danzig's incorporation by the Reich and to an extraterritorial highway passage connecting East Prussia with the rest of Germany through the so-called Polish Corridor (an area linking the Polish mainland with the Baltic Sea). Poland would join an anti-Soviet alliance and coordinate its foreign policy with Germany, thus becoming a client state. The independence-minded Polish government was alarmed and a British guarantee of Poland's independence was issued on 31 March 1939. Reacting to this act and to Poland's effective rejection of the German demands, Hitler renounced the existing German–Polish declaration of non-aggression on April 28.

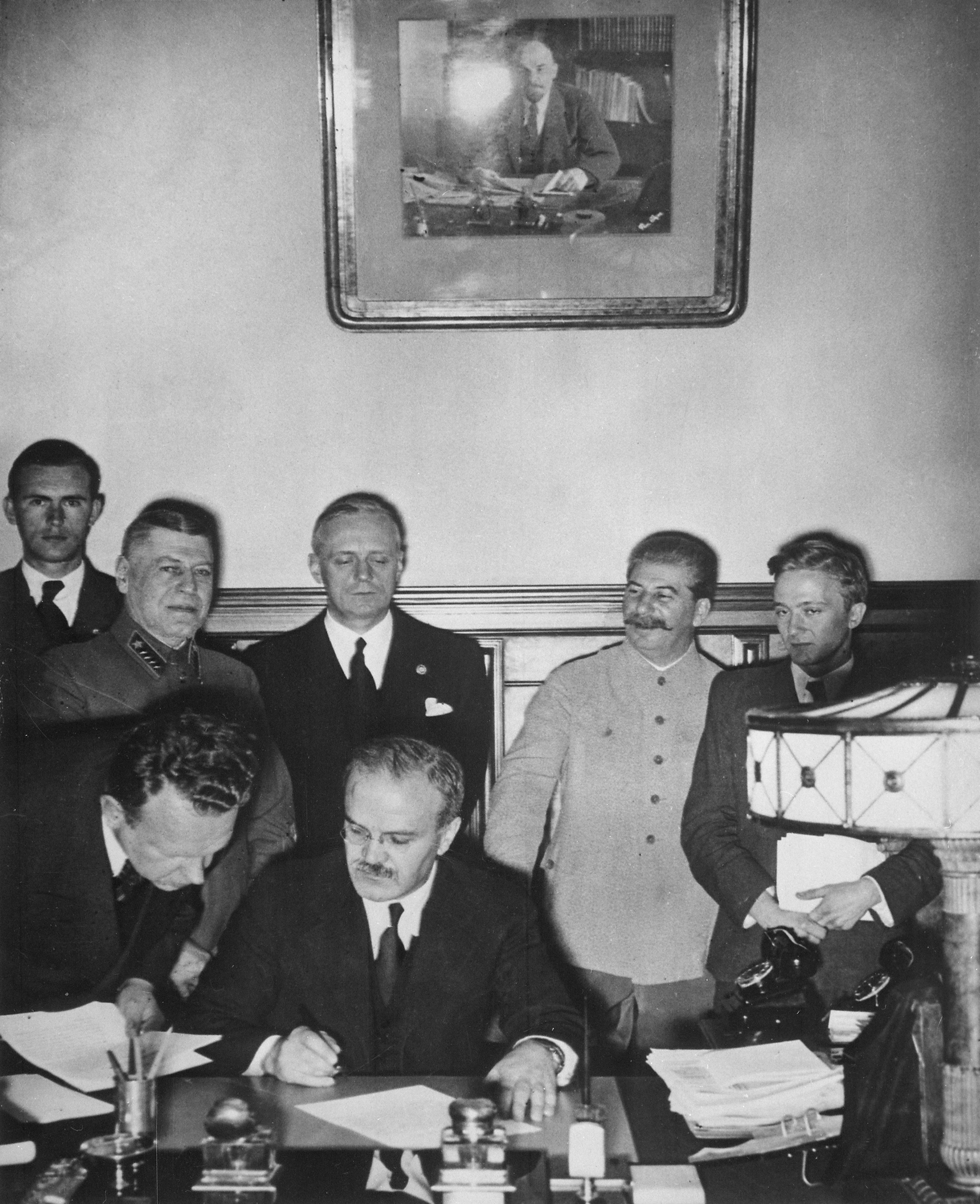
Soviet Prime Minister Vyacheslav Molotov signs the Molotov–Ribbentrop Pact. Behind him stand (left) Foreign Minister Joachim von Ribbentrop of Germany and (right) Joseph Stalin. The non-aggression pact had a secret protocol attached in which arrangements were made for a partition of Poland's territory.

In August 1939 negotiations took place in Moscow, launched by the competing Allied-Soviet and Nazi-Soviet working groups, each attempting to enlist Stalin's powerful army on their side. By the evening of 23 August 1939, Germany's offer was accepted by default, because the Polish leaders' refusal to cooperate militarily with the Soviets prevented the possibility of the alternate outcome. The Molotov–Ribbentrop Pact of non-aggression was signed. In anticipation of an attack and occupation of Poland by Nazi Germany, the pact had secret provisions attached, which delineated carving up parts of Eastern Europe into spheres of influence of the two signatories. The dividing line was running through the territory of east-central Poland. The "desirability of the maintenance of an independent Polish State" was left to mutually agreed "further political developments" read the text, which was discovered years later.^{[l]}

=== Military alliances ===
The Soviet Union, having its own reasons to fear the German eastward expansionism, repeatedly negotiated with France and the United Kingdom, and through them made an offer to Poland of an anti-German alliance, similar to the earlier one made to Czechoslovakia. The British and the French sought the formation of a powerful political-military bloc, comprising the Soviet Union, Poland and Romania in the east, and France and Britain in the west. As of May 1939, the Soviet conditions for signing an agreement with Britain and France were as follows: the right of the Red Army troops to pass through Polish territory, the termination of the Polish–Romanian alliance, and the limitation of the British guarantee to Poland to cover only Poland's western frontier with Germany. The Polish leaders believed that once on Polish territory the Soviet troops would not leave and throughout 1939 refused to agree to any arrangement which would allow Soviet troops to enter Poland.

The Polish unwillingness to accept the Soviet dangerous offer of free entry is illustrated by the quote of Marshal Edward Rydz-Śmigły, commander-in-chief of the Polish armed forces, who said: "With the Germans we run the risk of losing our liberty. With the Russians we will lose our soul". The attitude of the Polish leadership was also reflected by Foreign Minister Józef Beck, who, apparently confident in the French and British declarations of support, asserted that the security of Poland was not going to be guaranteed by a "Soviet or any other Russia". The Soviets then turned to concluding the German offer of a treaty and the Molotov–Ribbentrop Pact was signed. The Soviet-Nazi cooperation had been making progress since May 1939, when Vyacheslav Molotov became the Soviet minister of foreign affairs.

The German military used a system of automated code for the secret transfer of messages based on the Enigma machine. The constantly generated and altered code scheme was broken by Polish mathematicians led by Marian Rejewski and the discovery was shared with the French and the British before the outbreak of the war. Cryptanalysis of the Enigma was an immensely important Polish contribution to the war effort, as it was continued throughout the war in Britain and deprived the unsuspecting Germans of secrecy in their crucial communications.

At the end of August, the Polish-British and Polish-French alliance obligations were updated. Poland, surrounded by the Nazi-led coalition, was under partial military mobilization but poorly prepared for war.^{[p]} Full (general) mobilization was prevented by the pressure from the British and French governments, who sought a last-minute peaceful solution to the imminent Polish-German conflict. On 1 September 1939, Poland was invaded by Nazi Germany. Britain and France, bound by military alliances with Poland, declared war on Germany two days later.

== German and Soviet invasions of Poland ==
=== German invasion ===
Polish infantry in action during the Invasion of Poland in September 1939

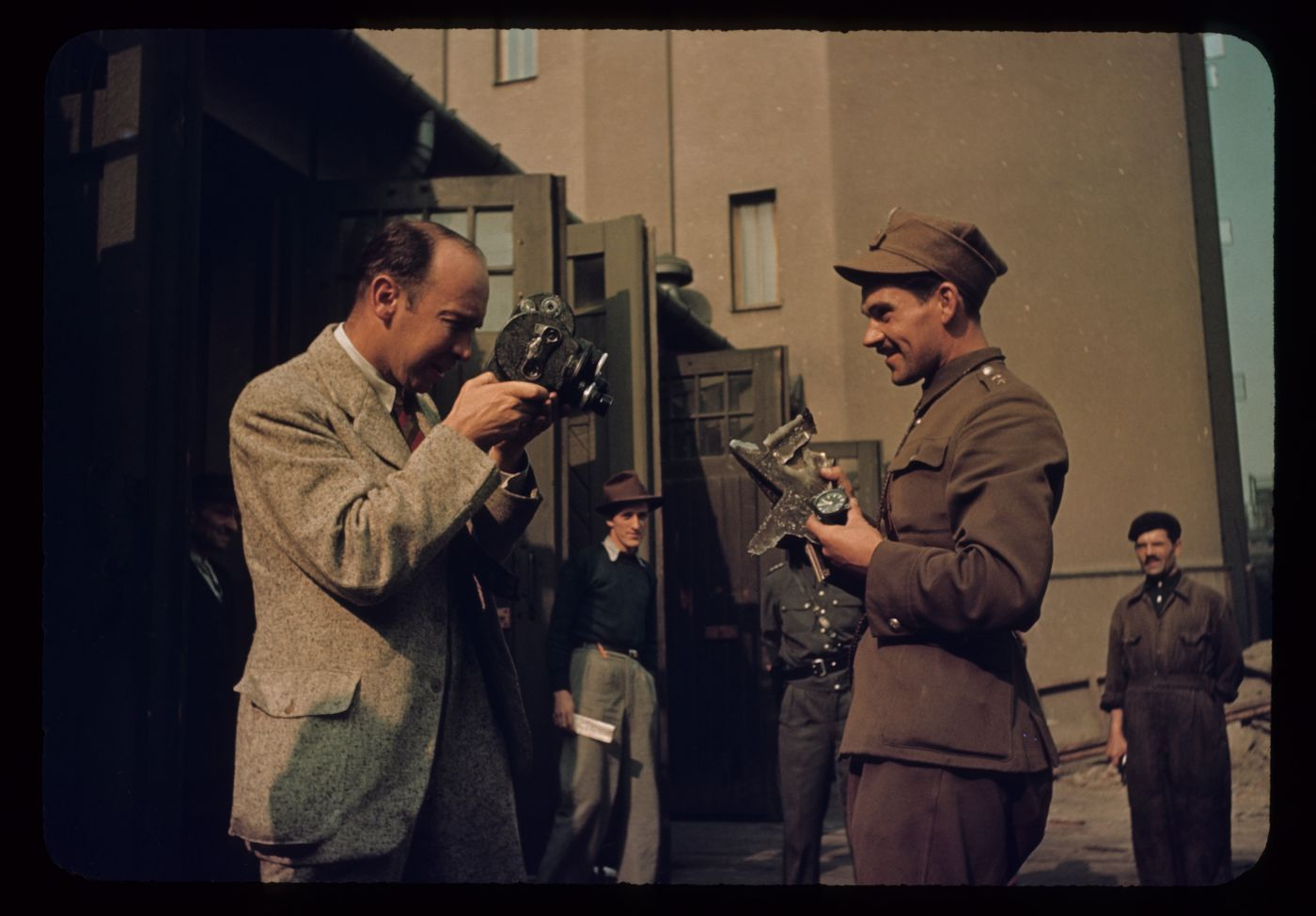
Polish anti-aircraft artillery in September 1939

"Poland: A Military Autopsy" American map

On 1 September 1939, without a formal declaration of war, Nazi Germany invaded Poland using the pretext of the Gleiwitz incident, a provocation (one of many) staged by the Germans, who claimed that Polish troops attacked a post along the German–Polish border. During the following days and weeks the technically, logistically and numerically superior German forces rapidly advanced into the Polish territory. Secured by the Molotov–Ribbentrop Pact, the Soviet troops also invaded Poland on 17 September 1939. Before the end of the month, most of Poland was divided between the Germans and the Soviets.

The Polish military did not anticipate the German attack. After 1926, Józef Piłsudski led the military to discontinue defense preparations of the western border. They were resumed in March 1939. Afterwards the Polish Armed Forces were organized for the defense of the country. According to the historian Andrzej Leon Sowa, the technical and organizational level of the Polish forces corresponded to that of the World War I period. The armed forces' strategic position was made more hopeless by the recent German occupation of Czechoslovakia. Poland was now surrounded on three sides by the German territories of Pomerania, Silesia and East Prussia, and the German-controlled Czechoslovakia. The newly formed Slovak state assisted their German allies by attacking Poland from the south. The Polish forces were blockaded on the Baltic Coast by the German navy. The Polish public, conditioned by government propaganda, was not aware of the gravity of the situation and expected a quick and easy victory of the Polish-French-British alliance.

The German "concept of annihilation" (Vernichtungsgedanke) that later evolved into the Blitzkrieg ("lightning war") provided for rapid advance of Panzer (armoured) divisions, dive bombing (to break up troop concentrations and destroy airports, railways and stations, roads, and bridges, which resulted in the killing of large numbers of refugees crowding the transportation facilities), and aerial bombing of undefended cities to sap civilian morale. Deliberate bombing of civilians took place on a massive scale from the first day of the war, also in areas far removed from any other military activity. The German forces, ordered by Hitler to act with the harshest cruelty, massively engaged in murder of Polish civilians. The Polish army, air force and navy had insufficient modern equipment to match the onslaught.

Each of Germany's five armies involved in attacking Poland was accompanied by a special security group charged with terrorizing the Polish population; some of the Polish citizens of German nationality had been trained in Germany to help with the invasion, forming the so-called fifth column. Many German leaders in Poland and communist activists were interned by the Polish authorities after 1 September. 10–15,000 ethnic Germans were arrested and force marched toward Kutno soon after the beginning of the hostilities. Of them about 2,000 were killed by angry Poles, and other instances of killing ethnic Germans took place elsewhere. Many times greater numbers of Polish civilians had been killed by the Wehrmacht throughout the "September Campaign".

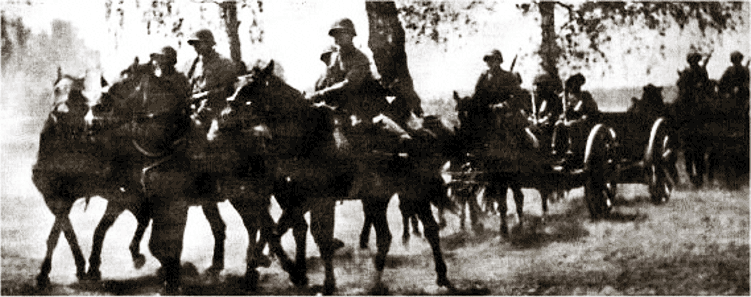
Polish cavalry at Battle of the Bzura

58 German divisions, including 9 Panzer divisions, were deployed against Poland. Germany commanded 1.5 million men, 187,000 motor vehicles, 15,000 artillery pieces, 2,600 tanks, 1,300 armored vehicles, 52,000 machine guns and 363,000 horses. 1,390 Luftwaffe warplanes were used to attack Polish targets. On 1 September the German navy positioned its old battleship Schleswig-Holstein to shell Westerplatte, a section of the Free City of Danzig, a defended enclave separate from the main city and awarded to Poland by the Treaty of Versailles in 1919. 53 navy ships were designated for action against Poland.

According to Antoni Czubiński, 1.2 million Polish troops had been mobilized, but some did not even have rifles. There were 30 infantry divisions, 11 cavalry brigades, 31 light artillery regiments, 10 heavy artillery regiments and 6 aerial regiments. They possessed 3,600 artillery pieces (mostly regular, with only a few hundred of anti-armor or anti-aircraft units), and 600 tanks, of which 120 were of the advanced 7TP-type. The air force regiments included 422 aircraft, including 160 PZL P.11c, 31 PZL P.7a and 20 P.11a fighters, 120 PZL.23 Karaś reconnaissance-bombers, and 45 PZL.37 Łoś medium bombers. The Polish-made P-series fighter planes were becoming obsolete; state-of-the art P-24s were built but sold abroad to generate currency. Łoś bombers were modern and fast. The navy's participation was limited by the withdrawal of major ships to the United Kingdom to prevent their destruction, and their linking up with the Royal Navy (known as the Peking Plan). The navy consisted of four destroyers (of which three had left for England), one minelayer, five submarines, and some smaller vessels, including six new minesweepers.

Although the UK and France declared war on Germany on 3 September, little movement took place on the western front. The offensive in the West that the Poles understood they were promised was not materializing, and, according to Norman Davies, it was not even immediately feasible or practical. Because of the Western inaction, of the secret protocols of the German-Soviet treaty, and other factors including its own poor intelligence, the Polish government was initially not fully aware of the degree of the country's isolation and the hopelessness of its situation. The combined British and French forces were strong in principle, but not ready for an offensive for a number of reasons. The few limited air raids attempted by the British were ineffective and caused losses of life and equipment. Dropping propaganda leaflets had henceforth become their preferred course of action, to the dismay of the Polish public, which was led to believe that a real war on two fronts and a defeat of the Third Reich were coming.

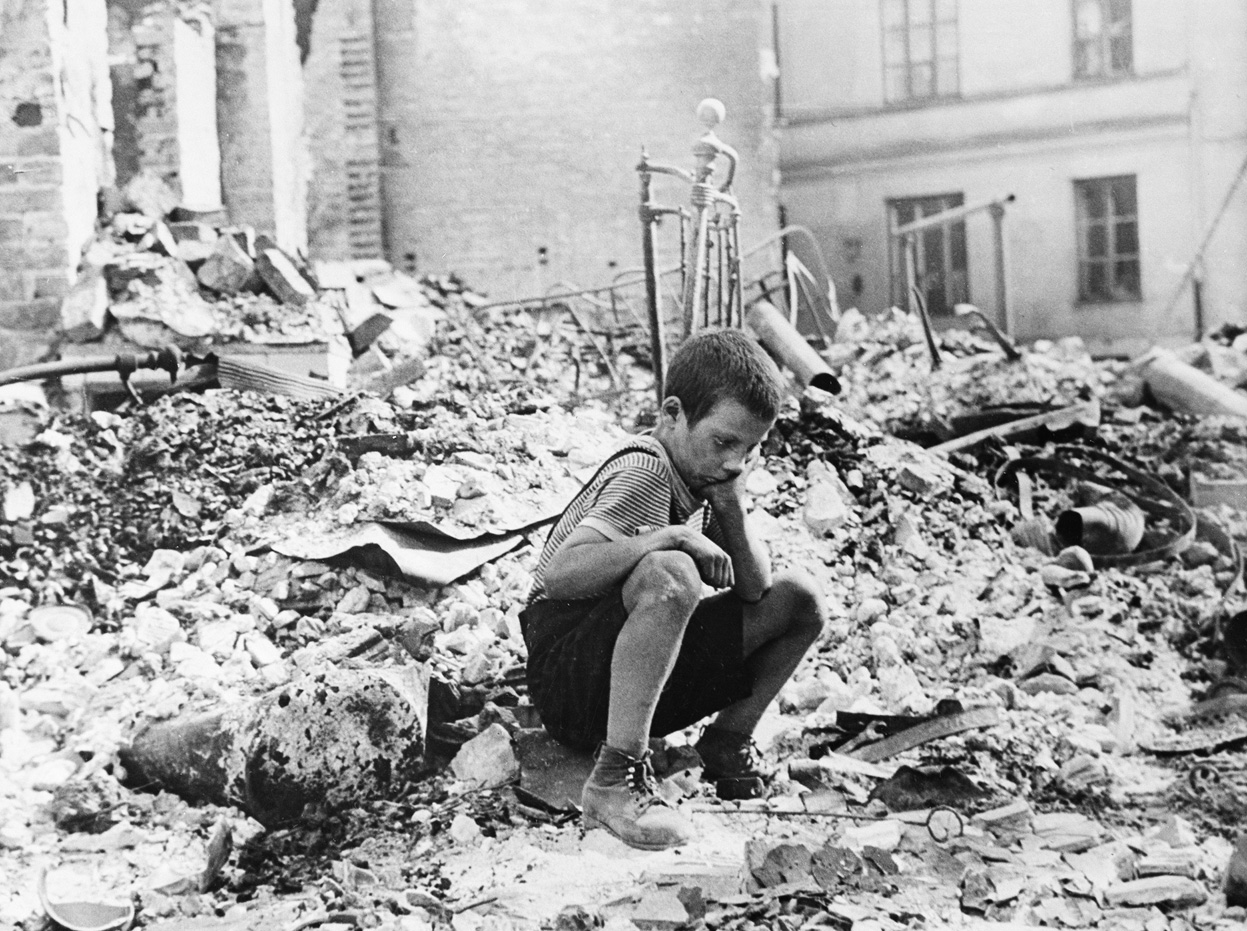
Survivor of bombing of Warsaw

The several Polish armies were defending the country in three main concentrations of troops, which had no territorial command structure of their own and operated directly under orders from Marshal Edward Rydz-Śmigły; it turned out to be a serious logistical shortcoming. The armies were positioned along the border in a semicircle, which provided for weak defense, because the Germans concentrated their forces in the chosen directions of attacks. The German armored corps quickly thwarted all attempts of organized resistance and by 3–4 September the Polish border defenses were broken along all the axes of attack. Crowds of civilian refugees fleeing to the east blocked roads and bridges. The Germans were also able to circumvent other concentrations of the Polish military and arrive in the rear of Polish formations.

As the Polish armies were being destroyed or in retreat, the Germans took Częstochowa on 4 September, Kraków and Kielce on 6 September. The Polish government was evacuated to Volhynia and the supreme military commander Rydz-Śmigły left Warsaw on the night of 6 September and moved in the eastern direction toward Brześć. General Walerian Czuma took over and organized the defense of the capital city. According to Halik Kochanski, Rydz-Śmigły fled the capital and the Polish high command failed its army. Rydz-Śmigły's departure had disastrous effects on both the morale of the Polish armed forces and on his ability to exercise effective overall command.

The Germans began surrounding Warsaw on 9 September. City president Stefan Starzyński played an especially prominent role in its defense. The campaign's greatest Battle of the Bzura was fought west of the middle Vistula on 9–21 September. Heavy fighting took place also at a number of other locations, including the area of Tomaszów Lubelski (until 26 September), and a determined defense of Lwów was mounted (against the German forces until 22 September, when the defenders surrendered to the Soviets upon their arrival). On 13 September, Marshal Rydz-Śmigły ordered all Polish forces to withdraw toward the so-called Romanian Bridgehead in southeastern Poland, next to the Romanian and Soviet borders, the area he designated to be the final defense bastion.

On 11 September, foreign minister Józef Beck asked France to grant asylum to the Polish government and Romania to allow the transfer of the government members through its territory. On 12 September, the Anglo-French Supreme War Council deliberating in Abbeville, France concluded that the Polish military campaign had already been resolved and that there was no point in launching an anti-German relief expedition. The Polish leaders were unaware of the decision and still expected a Western offensive.

=== Soviet invasion ===
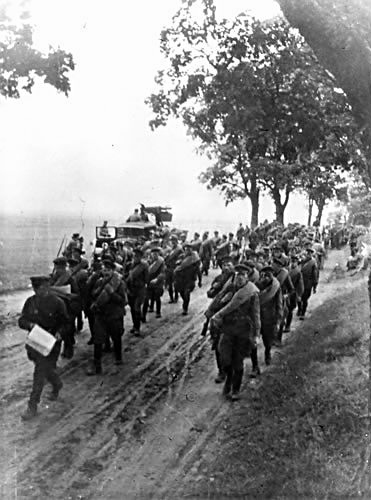
Soviet invasion of Poland, September 1939

From 3 September Germany urged the Soviet Union to engage its troops against the Polish state, but the Soviet command kept stalling, waiting for the outcome of the German-Polish confrontation and to see what the French and the British were going to do. The Soviet Union assured Germany that the Red Army advance into Poland would follow later at an appropriate time.

For the optimal "political motivation" (a collapse of Poland having taken place), Molotov wished to hold the Soviet intervention until the fall of Warsaw, but the city's capture by the Germans was being delayed due to its determined defense effort (until September 27). The Soviet troops marched on 17 September into Poland, which the Soviet Union claimed to be by then non-existent anyway (according to the historian Richard Overy, Poland was defeated by Germany within two weeks from 1 September). The Soviet invasion of Poland was justified by the Soviets by their own security concerns and by the need to protect the ethnically Belarusian and Ukrainian populations. The invasion was coordinated with the movement of the German army, and met limited resistance from the Polish forces. The Polish military formations available in the eastern part of the country were ordered by the high command, who were then at the Romanian border, to avoid engaging the Soviets,^{[c]} but some fighting between Soviet and Polish units did take place (such as the Battle of Szack fought by the Border Protection Corps). The Soviet forces moved west (to the Bug River) and south to fill the area allotted to them by the secret protocol of the Molotov–Ribbentrop Pact. They took steps to block the potential Polish evacuation routes into Lithuania, Latvia, Romania and Hungary.

About 13.4 million Polish citizens lived in the areas seized by the Soviet Union. Of those, about 8.7 million were Ukrainians, Belarusians and Jews. The minorities' relations with the Polish authorities were generally bad and many of their members greeted and supported the arriving Red Army troops as liberators. The British and French responses to the "not unexpected" Soviet encroachment were muted.

Had it not been for the Soviet-German treaty and the Soviet invasion, all of prewar Poland would have likely been captured by Nazi Germany already in 1939.

=== End of campaign ===
The Nazi-Soviet treaty process was continued with the German–Soviet Frontier Treaty signed on 28 September. It adjusted and finalized the territorial division, placing Lithuania within the Soviet sphere and moving the Soviet-German agreed boundary east from the Vistula to the Bug River, and authorized further joint action to control occupied Poland. An idea of retaining a residual Polish state, considered earlier, was abandoned.

The Polish government and military high command retreated to the southeast Romanian Bridgehead territory and crossed into neutral Romania on the night of 17 September. From Romania on 18 September President Ignacy Mościcki and Marshal Rydz-Śmigły issued declarations and orders, which violated their status of persons passing through a neutral country. Germany pressured Romania not to allow the Polish authorities to depart (their intended destination was France) and the group was interned. The Polish ambassador in Romania helped General Władysław Sikorski, a member of the Polish opposition who was refused a military assignment and also entered Romania, to acquire departure documents and the general left for France.

Resistance continued in many places. Warsaw was eventually bombed into submission. The event that served as a trigger for its surrender on 27 September was the bombing damage to the water supply system caused by deliberate targeting of the waterworks. Warsaw suffered the greatest damage and civilian losses (40,000 killed), already in September 1939.^{[s]} The Modlin Fortress capitulated on 29 September, the Battle of Hel continued until 2 October, and the Battle of Kock was fought until 4 October. In the country's woodlands, army units began underground resistance almost at once. Major "Hubal" and his regiment pioneered this movement. During the September Campaign, the Polish Army lost about 66,000 troops on the German front; about 400,000 became prisoners of Germany and about 230,000 of the Soviet Union.^{[e]} 80,000 managed to leave the country. 16,600 German soldiers were killed and 3,400 were missing. 1000 German tanks or armored vehicles and 600 planes were destroyed. The Soviet Army lost between 2,500 and 3,000 soldiers, while 6,000 to 7,000 Polish defenders were killed in the east. Over 12,000 Polish citizens executed by the Nazis were among the approximate 100,000 civilian victims of the campaign.

Several Polish Navy ships reached the United Kingdom and tens of thousands of soldiers escaped through Hungary, Romania, Lithuania and Sweden to continue the fight. Many Poles took part in the Battle of France, the Battle of Britain, and, allied with the British forces, in other operations (see Polish contribution to World War II).

== Occupation of Poland ==
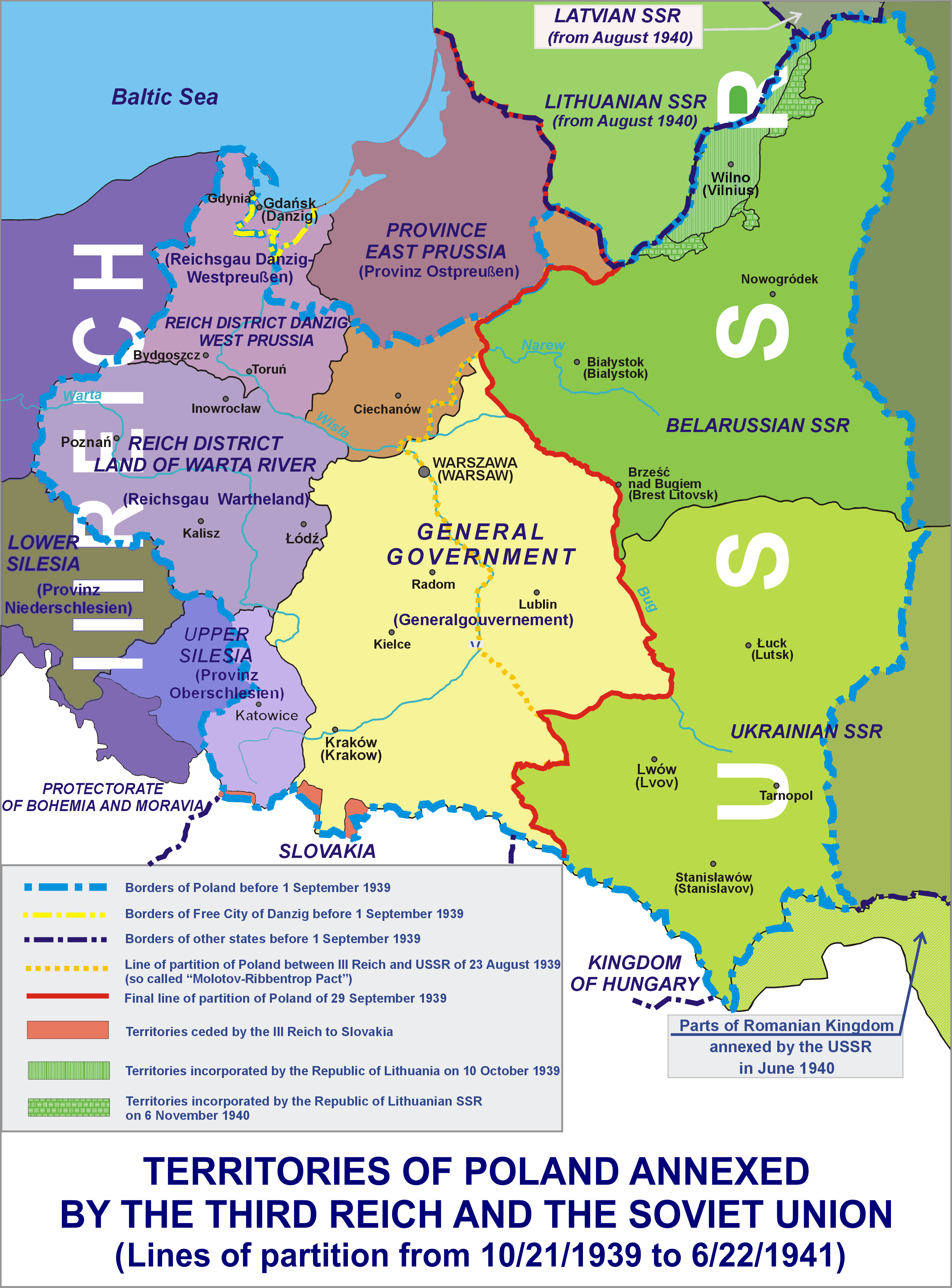
Poland was partitioned in 1939 as agreed by Germany and the Soviet Union in their treaty; division of Polish territories in 1939–41

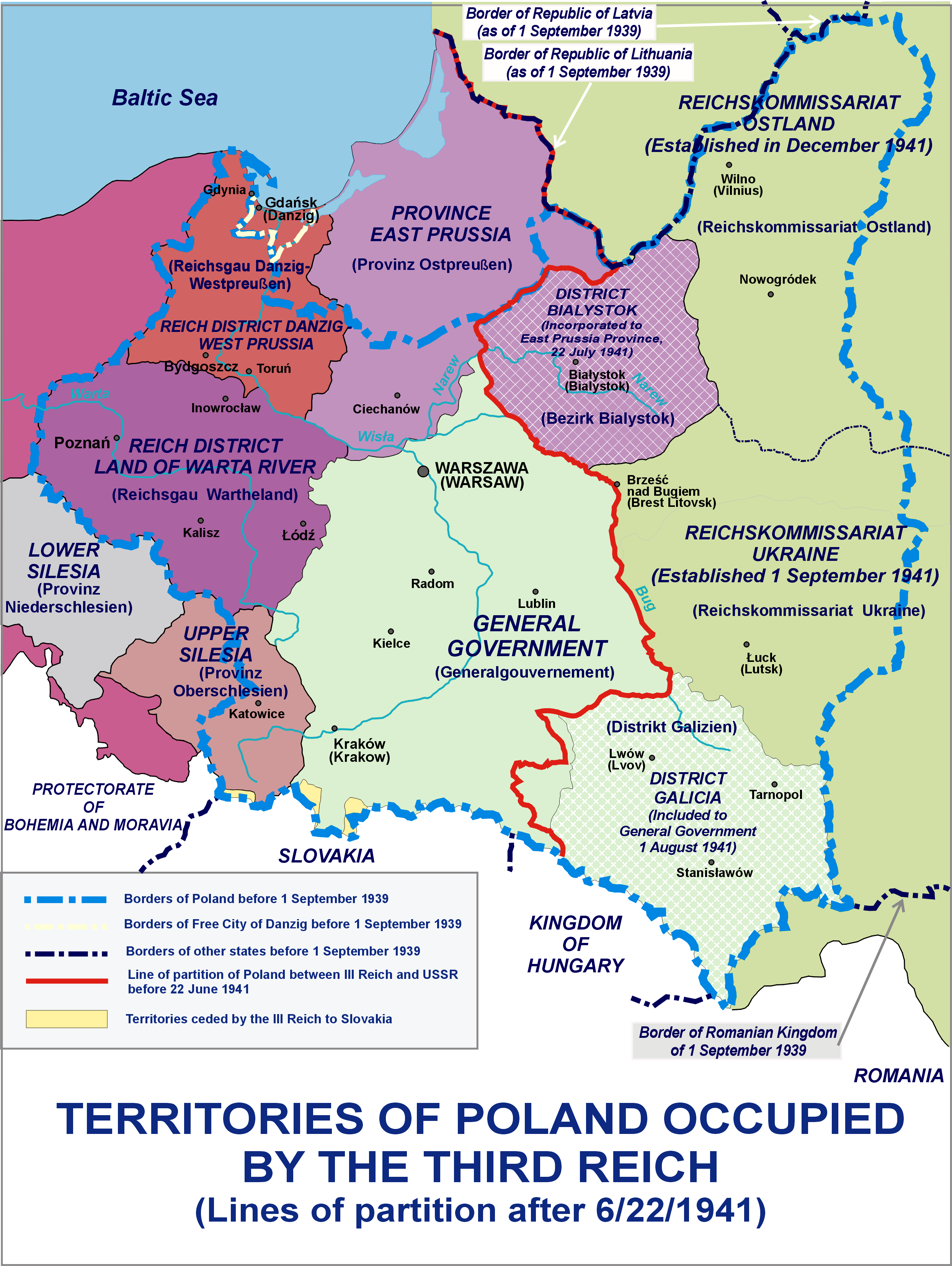
Changes in administration of Polish territories following the 1941 German invasion of the Soviet Union

=== German-occupied Poland ===
The greatest extent of depredations and terror inflicted on and suffered by the Poles resulted from the German occupation. The most catastrophic series of events was the extermination of the Jews known as the Holocaust.

About one-sixth of Polish citizens lost their lives in the war, and most of the civilian losses resulted from various targeted, deliberate actions. The German plan involved not only the annexation of Polish territory but also a total destruction of Polish culture and the Polish nation (Generalplan Ost).

Under the terms of two decrees by Hitler (8 October and 12 October 1939), large areas of western Poland were annexed to Germany. These included all the territories which Germany had lost under the 1919 Treaty of Versailles, such as the Polish Corridor, West Prussia and Upper Silesia, but also a large, indisputably Polish area east of these territories, including the city of Łódź.

The annexed areas of Poland were divided into the following administrative units:

- Reichsgau Wartheland (initially Reichsgau Posen), which included the entire Poznań Voivodeship, most of the Łódź Voivodeship, five counties of the Pomeranian Voivodeship, and one county of the Warsaw Voivodeship;
- the remaining area of the Pomeranian Voivodeship, which was incorporated into the Reichsgau Danzig-West Prussia (initially Reichsgau Westpreussen);
- Ciechanów District (Regierungsbezirk Zichenau) consisting of five northern counties of the Warsaw Voivodeship (Płock, Płońsk, Sierpc, Ciechanów and Mława), which became a part of East Prussia;
- Katowice District (Regierungsbezirk Kattowitz) or, unofficially, East Upper Silesia (Ost-Oberschlesien), which included the Silesian Voivodeship, Sosnowiec, Będzin, Chrzanów, Oświęcim, and Zawiercie counties, and parts of Olkusz and Żywiec counties, which became a part of the Province of Upper Silesia.

The area of these annexed territories was 92,500 square kilometres and the population was about 10.6 million, a great majority of whom were Poles.

In Pomeranian districts German summary courts sentenced to death 11,000 Poles in late 1939 and early 1940. A total of 30,000 Poles were executed there already in 1939, with an additional 10,000 in Greater Poland and 1500 in Silesia. Jews were expelled from the annexed areas and placed in ghettos such as the Warsaw Ghetto or the Łódź Ghetto. Catholic priests became targets of campaigns of murder and deportation on a mass scale. The population in the annexed territories was subjected to intense racial screening and Germanisation. The Poles experienced property confiscations and severe discrimination; 100,000 were removed from the port city of Gdynia alone already in October 1939. In 1939–40, many Polish citizens were deported to other Nazi-controlled areas, especially the General Government, or to concentration camps. With the clearing of some western Poland regions for German resettlement, the Nazis initiated the policies of ethnic cleansing. About one million Poles were forcibly removed from their dwellings and replaced with over 386,000 ethnic Germans brought from distant places.

(see also: Expulsion of Poles by Nazi Germany)

Under the terms of the Molotov–Ribbentrop Pact and the German–Soviet Frontier Treaty, the Soviet Union annexed all Polish territory east of the line of the rivers Pisa, Narew, Bug and San, except for the area around Vilnius (known in Polish as Wilno), which was given to Lithuania, and the Suwałki region, which was annexed by Germany. These territories were largely inhabited by Ukrainians and Belarusians, with minorities of Poles and Jews (for numbers see Curzon Line). The total area, including the area given to Lithuania, was 201,000 square kilometres, with a population of 13.2 million. A small strip of land that was a part of Hungary before 1914 was given to Slovakia.

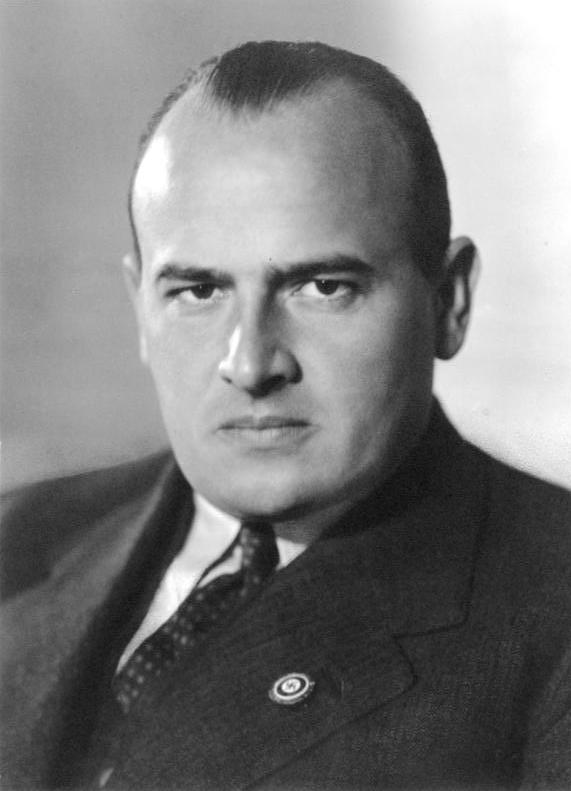
Hans Frank

After the German attack on the Soviet Union in June 1941, the Polish territories previously occupied by the Soviets were organized as follows:

- Bezirk Bialystok (District of Białystok), which included the Białystok, Bielsk Podlaski, Grajewo, Łomża, Sokółka, Wołkowysk, and Grodno counties, was "attached" to (but not incorporated into) East Prussia;
- Bezirke Litauen und Weißrussland – the Polish part of White Russia (today western Belarus) and the Vilnius province were incorporated into the Reichskommissariat Ostland;
- Bezirk Wolhynien-Podolien – the Polish Province of Volhynia, was incorporated into the Reichskommissariat Ukraine;
- Distrikt Galizien, East Galicia, was incorporated into the General Government and became its fifth district.

The remaining block of territory was placed under a German administration called the General Government (in German Generalgouvernement für die besetzten polnischen Gebiete), with its capital at Kraków. It became a part of Greater Germany (Grossdeutsches Reich). The General Government was originally subdivided into four districts, Warsaw, Lublin, Radom, and Kraków, to which East Galicia and a part of Volhynia were added as a district in 1941. (For more detail on the territorial division of this area see General Government.) The General Government was the nearest to Germany proper part of the planned Lebensraum or German "living space" in the east, and constituted the beginning of the implementation of the Nazi grandiose and genocidal human engineering scheme.

A German lawyer and prominent Nazi, Hans Frank, was appointed Governor-General of the General Government on 26 October 1939. Frank oversaw the segregation of the Jews into ghettos in the larger cities, including Warsaw, and the use of Polish civilians for compulsory labour in German war industries.

Some Polish institutions, including the police (the number of the so-called Blue Police reached about 12,500 in 1943), were preserved in the General Government. Over 40,000 Poles worked in the General Government's administration, supervised by over 10,000 Germans. Political activity was prohibited and only basic Polish education was allowed. University professors in Kraków were sent to a concentration camp and in Lviv were shot.^{[d]} Ethnic Poles were to be gradually eliminated. The Jews, intended for a more immediate extermination, were herded into ghettos and severely repressed. The Jewish councils in the ghettos had to follow the German policies. Many Jews escaped to the Soviet Union (they were among the estimated 300,000 to 400,000 refugees that arrived there from German-occupied Poland) and some were sheltered by Polish families.

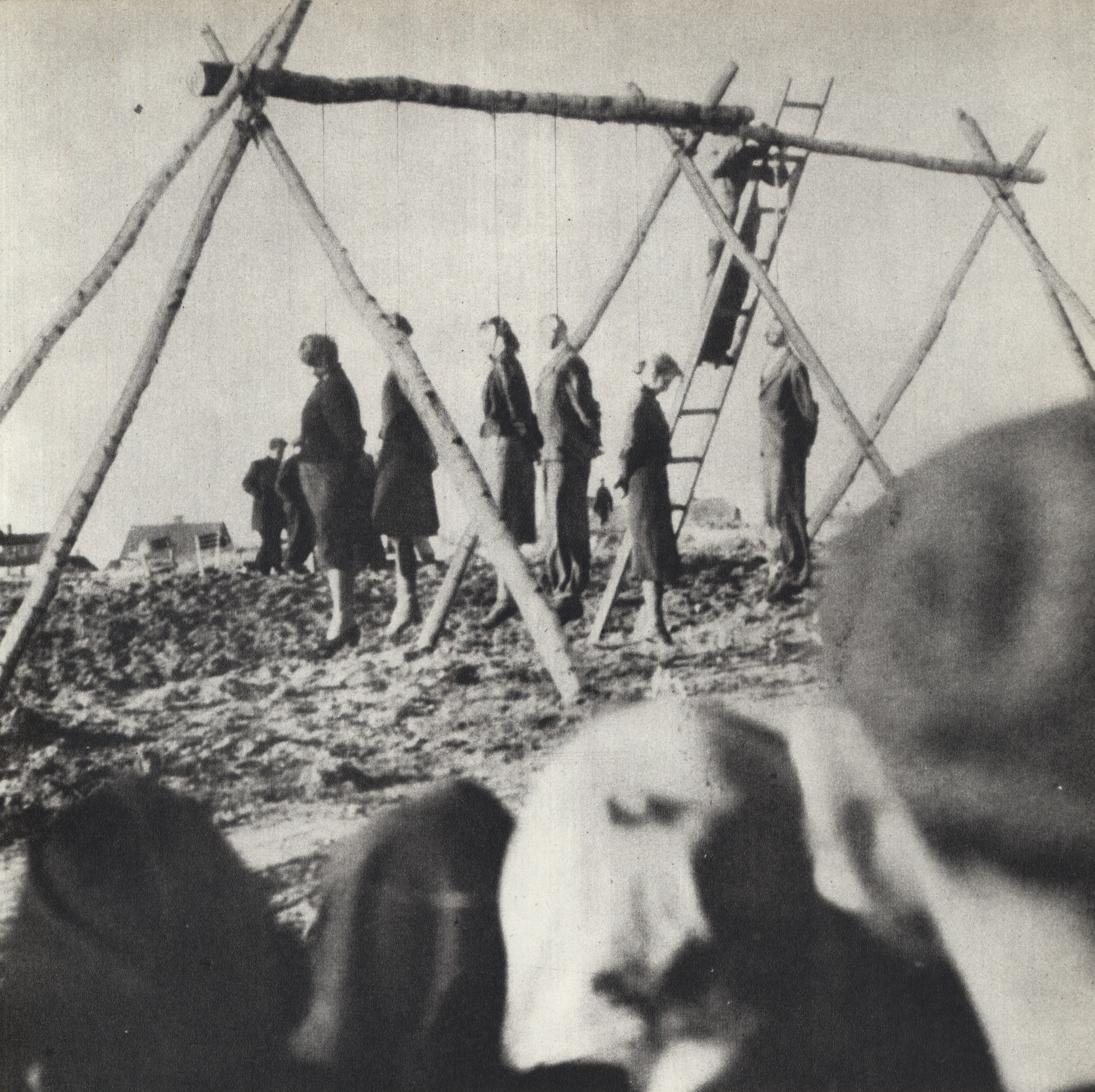
Public execution of 54 Poles in Rożki village, 1942

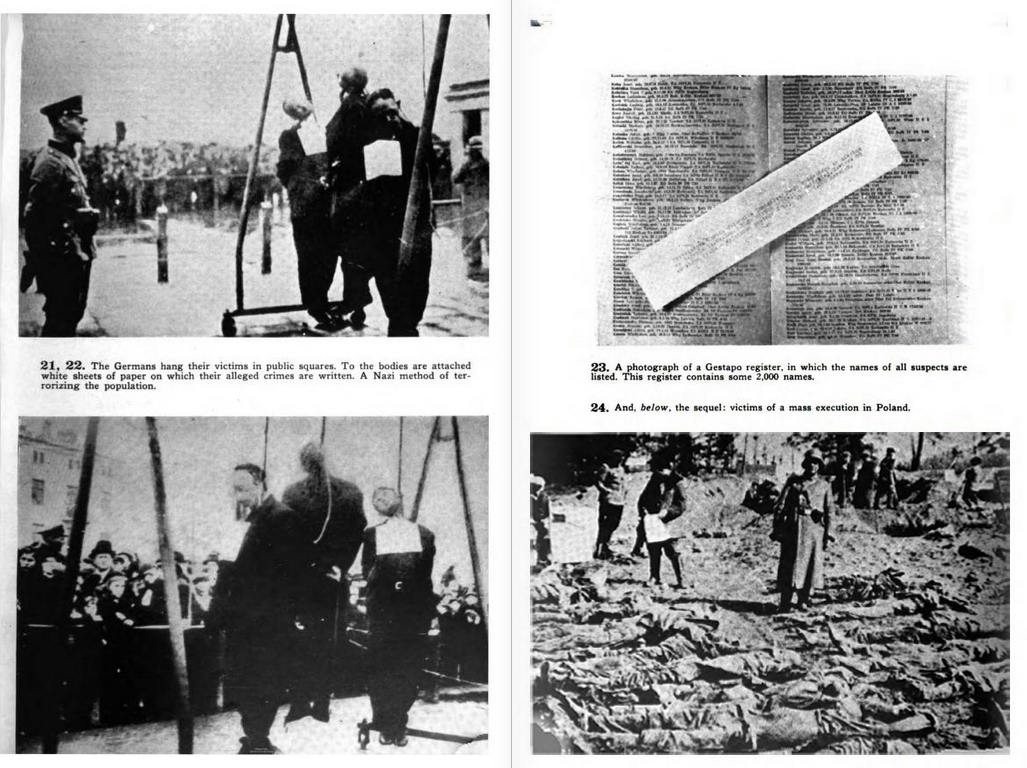
Photos from The Black Book of Poland, published in London in 1942 by the Polish Government-in-Exile

The population in the General Government's territory was initially about 11.5 million in an area of 95,500 km^{2}, but this increased as about 860,000 Poles and Jews were expelled from the German-annexed areas and "resettled" in the General Government. After Operation Barbarossa, the General Government's area was 141,000 km^{2}, with 17.4 million inhabitants.

Tens of thousands were murdered in the German campaign of extermination of the Polish intelligentsia and other elements thought likely to resist (e.g. Operation Tannenberg and Aktion AB). Catholic clergy were commonly imprisoned or otherwise persecuted; many were murdered in concentration camps. Tens of thousands of members of the resistance and others were tortured and executed at the Pawiak prison in Warsaw. From 1941, disease and hunger also began to reduce the population, as the exploitation of resources and labor, terror and Germanisation reached greater intensity after the attack on the Soviet Union. Poles were also deported in large numbers to work as forced labor in Germany, or taken to concentration camps. About two million were transported to Germany to work as slaves and many died there.^{[i]} Łapanka or random roundup, on streets or elsewhere, was one of the methods practiced by the Nazis to catch prisoners for labor. Several hundred Wehrmacht brothels, for which local non-German women were forcibly recruited, operated throughout the Reich. In contrast to Nazi policies in occupied Western Europe, the Germans treated the Poles with intense hostility and all Polish state property and private industrial concerns were taken over by the German state. Poland was plundered and subjected to extreme economic exploitation throughout the war period.

The future fate of Poland and Poles was stipulated in Generalplan Ost, a Nazi plan to engage in genocide and ethnic cleansing of the territories occupied by Germany in Eastern Europe in order to exterminate the Slavic peoples. Tens of millions were to be eliminated, others resettled in Siberia or turned into slave populations. The cleared territories were to be resettled by Germans. A trial evacuation of all Poles was attempted in the Zamość region in 1942 and 1943. 121,000 Poles were removed from their villages and replaced with 10,000 German settlers.

Under the Lebensborn program, about 200,000 Polish children were kidnapped by the Germans to be tested for racial characteristics that would make them suitable for Germanisation. Of that number (many were found unsuitable and killed), only between 15% and 20% were returned to Poland after the war.

When German occupation extended to the eastern Kresy territories after they were taken from the Soviet Union in the summer of 1941, the Nazis unleashed there their genocidal anti-Jewish policies. They conducted terror campaigns directed against ethnic Poles, including especially such groups as intelligentsia or Catholic clergy. Ethnic Ukrainians, Belarusians and Lithuanians, while themselves subjected to brutal occupation, generally received more favorable treatment from the Nazis. Their nationalists and others were used by the occupant in actions against ethnic Poles or allowed to conduct anti-Polish activities themselves. Members of all four ethnicities were encouraged to act against the Jews and participated in pogroms and other instances of killing of Jews.

Different segments of Polish society experienced different degrees of suffering under the German occupation. Residents of rural villages and small towns generally did better than big city dwellers, while the land-owning class (ziemiaństwo or szlachta), privileged in independent Poland, prospered also during the war.

In the postwar Nuremberg trials, the International Military Tribunal stated: "The wholesale extermination of Jews and also of Poles had all the characteristics of genocide in the biological meaning of this term".

According to a 2009 estimate by the Institute of National Remembrance (IPN), between 5.62 million and 5.82 million Polish citizens (including Polish Jews) died as a result of the German occupation.

=== Soviet-occupied Poland ===
By the end of the Soviet invasion, the Soviet Union took 50.1% of the territory of Poland (195,300 km^{2}), with 12,662,000 people. Population estimates vary; one analysis gives the following numbers in regard to the ethnic composition of these areas at the time: 38% Poles, 37% Ukrainians, 14.5% Belarusians, 8.4% Jews, 0.9% Russians and 0.6% Germans. There were also 336,000 refugees from the areas occupied by Germany, most of them Jews (198,000). Areas occupied by the Soviet Union were annexed to Soviet territory, with the exception of the Wilno/Vilnius region, which was transferred to the Republic of Lithuania. The majority of Polish-speaking inhabitants of the Vilnius region soon found themselves subjected to the Lithuanization policies of the Lithuanian authorities, which led to lasting ethnic conflicts in the area. Lithuania, including the contested Vilnius area, was itself incorporated by the Soviet Union in the summer of 1940 and became the Lithuanian Soviet Socialist Republic.

The Soviets considered the Kresy territories (prewar eastern Poland) to be colonized by the Poles and the Red Army was proclaimed a liberator of the conquered nationalities. Many Jews, Ukrainians, Belarusians and Lithuanians shared that point of view and cooperated with the new authorities in repressing the Poles. The Soviet administrators used slogans about class struggle and dictatorship of the proletariat, as they applied the policies of Stalinism and Sovietization in occupied eastern Poland. On 22 and 26 October 1939, the Soviets staged elections to Moscow-controlled Supreme Soviets (legislative bodies) of the newly created provinces of Western Ukraine and Western Byelorussia to legitimize the Soviet rule. The new assemblies subsequently called for the incorporation into the Soviet Union, and the Supreme Soviet of the Soviet Union annexed the two territories to the already existing Soviet republics (the Ukrainian Soviet Socialist Republic and the Byelorussian Soviet Socialist Republic) on 2 November.

All institutions of the dismantled Polish state were closed down and reopened with new directors who were mostly Russian and in rare cases Ukrainian or Polish. Lviv University and other schools restarted anew as Soviet institutions. Some departments, such as law and humanities were abolished; new subjects, including Darwinism, Leninism and Stalinism were taught by the reorganized departments. Tuition was free and monetary stipends were offered to students.

The Soviet authorities attempted to remove all signs of Polish existence and activity in the area. On 21 December, the Polish currency was withdrawn from circulation with limited exchange to the newly introduced ruble. In schools, Polish language books were burned.

All the media became controlled by Moscow. Soviet occupation implemented a police state type political regime, based on terror. All Polish parties and organisations were disbanded. Only the communist party and subordinate organisations were allowed to exist. Soviet teachers in schools encouraged children to spy on their parents.

Ukrainian and Belarusian social organizations, closed by the Polish government in the 1930s, were reopened. In schools, the language of instruction was changed to Ukrainian or Belarusian.

The Roman Catholic and Greek Catholic churches were persecuted, lost many estates, seminaries and affiliated social organizations, but kept most of their primary facilities (houses of worship) open and were able to provide religious services and organize pilgrimages. Priests were discriminated against by the authorities and subjected to high taxes, drafts into military service, arrests and deportations.

Many enterprises were taken over by the state or failed, small trade and production shops had to join cooperatives, but only a small proportion of peasant agriculture was made collective (over ten percent of the arable area) by the start of the war with Germany. Among the industrial installations dismantled and sent east were most of the Białystok textile industry factories. The results of the Soviet economic policies soon resulted in serious difficulties, as shops lacked goods, food was scarce and people were threatened by famine. Nevertheless, the conditions were better under the Soviets than in the German-run General Government. The industry was developed in Lviv and elsewhere and unemployment was officially eliminated by the spring of 1940. The living standards, following the initial collapse, kept gradually improving, many services were free or inexpensive and the poor and people with technical education fared better than under the Polish rule. The cities, of which Lviv and Białystok were particularly well-maintained by the Soviet authorities, were in much better shape than the countryside. The situation was very difficult for the Polish retirees, deprived of their pensions, and for the tens of thousands of war refugees who fled German-occupied Poland and settled in the eastern cities.

According to the Soviet law of 29 November 1939, all residents of the annexed area, referred to as citizens of former Poland, automatically acquired the Soviet citizenship. Residents were still required and pressured to consent and those who opted out (most Poles did not want to give up the Polish citizenship) were threatened with repatriation to Nazi controlled territories of Poland.

The Soviets exploited past ethnic tensions between Poles and other ethnic groups, inciting and encouraging violence against Poles by calling upon the minorities to "rectify the wrongs they had suffered during twenty years of Polish rule". The hostile propaganda resulted in instances of bloody repression.

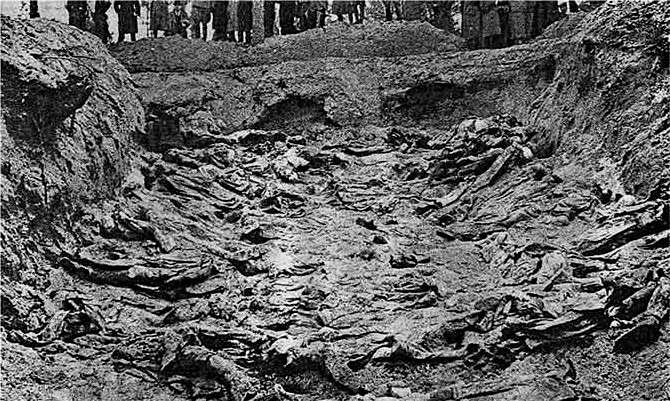
One of the mass graves of the Katyn massacre (spring 1940), exhumed in 1943. The number of victims is estimated at 22,000, with a lower limit of confirmed dead of 21,768. Of them 4,421 were from Kozelsk, 3,820 from Starobelsk, 6,311 from Ostashkov, and 7,305 from Byelorussian and Ukrainian prisons.

Parts of the Ukrainian population initially welcomed the end of Polish rule and the phenomenon was strengthened by a land reform. The Soviet authorities also started a limited collectivisation campaign. There were large groups of prewar Polish citizens, notably Jewish youth, and, to a lesser extent, Ukrainian peasants, who saw the Soviet power as an opportunity to start political or social activity outside of their traditional ethnic or cultural groups. Their enthusiasm faded with time as it became clear that the Soviet repressions affected everybody. The organisation of Ukrainians desiring independent Ukraine (the OUN) was persecuted as "anti-Soviet".

A rule of terror was started by the NKVD and other Soviet agencies. The first victims were the approximately 230,000 Polish prisoners of war. The Soviet Union had not signed any international convention on rules of war and they were denied the status of prisoners of war. When the Soviets conducted recruitment activities among the Polish military, an overwhelming majority of the captured officers refused to cooperate; they were considered enemies of the Soviet Union and a decision was made by the Soviet Politburo (5 March 1940) to secretly execute them (22,000 officers and others). The officers and a large number of ordinary soldiers were then murdered (see Katyn massacre) or sent to Gulag. Of the 10,000–12,000 Poles sent to Kolyma in 1940–41, mostly POWs, only 583 men survived, released in 1941–42 to join the Polish Armed Forces in the East.

Terror policies were also applied to the civilian population. The Soviet authorities regarded service for the prewar Polish state as a "crime against revolution" and "counter-revolutionary activity", and subsequently started arresting large numbers of Polish intelligentsia, politicians, civil servants and scientists, but also ordinary people suspected of posing a threat to the Soviet rule. Schoolchildren as young as 10 or 12 years old who laughed at Soviet propaganda presented in schools were sent into prisons, sometimes for as long as 10 years.

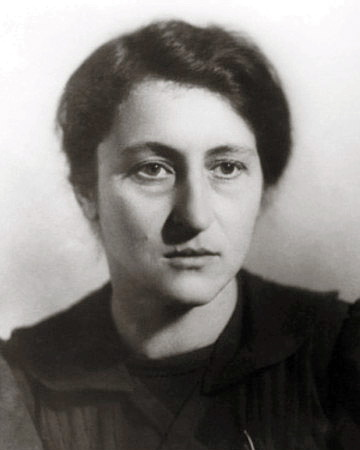
Wanda Wasilewska

The prisons soon became severely overcrowded with detainees suspected of anti-Soviet activities and the NKVD had to open dozens of ad hoc prison sites in almost all towns of the region. The wave of arrests led to the forced resettlement of large categories of people (kulaks, Polish civil servants, forest workers, university professors or osadniks, for instance) to the Gulag labor camps. An estimated 30–40 thousand Polish citizens were held at the labor camps in 1939–1941. The Polish and formerly Polish citizens, a large proportion of whom were ethnic minorities, were deported mostly in 1940, typically to northern Russia, Kazakhstan and Siberia. According to the NKVD data, of the 107,000 Polish citizens of different ethnicities arrested by June 1941, 39,000 were tried and sentenced for various transgressions, including 1200 given death sentences. At that time, 40,000 were imprisoned in NKVD prisons and about 10,000 of them were murdered by the Soviets during prison evacuation after the German attack.

Among the Poles who decided to cooperate with the Soviet authorities were Wanda Wasilewska, who was allowed to publish a Polish language periodical in Lviv, and Zygmunt Berling, who from 1940 led a small group of Polish officers working on the concept of formation of a Polish division in the Soviet Union. Wasilewska, an informal leader of Polish communists, was received by Stalin at the Kremlin on 28 June 1940. The event marked the beginning of the reorientation of Soviet policies with respect to Poles, which would have momentous consequences for the next half-century and beyond. The Soviets undertook a number of conciliatory measures, such as organizing celebrations of the 85th anniversary of the death of the poet Adam Mickiewicz in November 1940 in Moscow, Lviv, and at other concentrations of the Polish population, or expanding Polish language general and higher education activities in Soviet-controlled territories. Wasilewska and Berling pushed for the Polish division again in September 1942, but Soviet permission for building a Soviet-allied Polish armed force was granted only after the break in diplomatic relations between the Soviet Union and the Polish Government-in-Exile in April 1943.

Unlike in German-occupied Poland, where open cooperation with the occupier was rare among the Polish elites, many Polish intellectuals, artists, literary figures, and journalists cooperated with the Soviets and their activity often included participation in Soviet propaganda undertakings.

Following the Operation Barbarossa and the Sikorski–Mayski agreement, in the summer of 1941, the exiled Poles were released under the declared amnesty. Many thousands trekked south to join the newly formed Polish Army, but thousands were too weak to complete the journey or perished soon afterwards.

According to a 2009 estimate by the IPN, around 150,000 Polish citizens died as a result of the Soviet occupation. The number of deportees was estimated at 320,000.

=== Collaboration with the occupiers ===
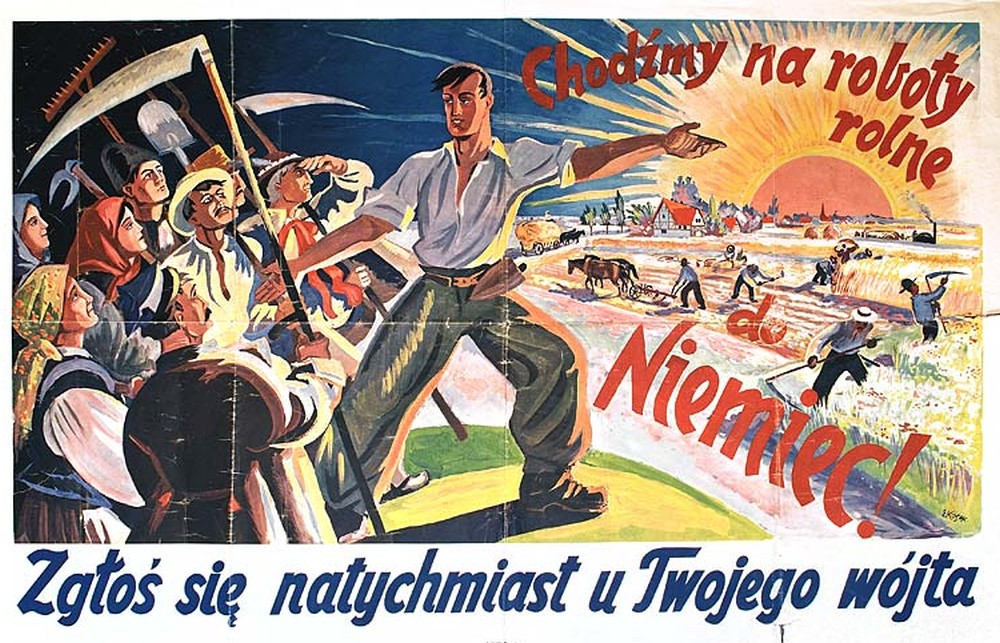
German recruitment poster: "Let's do agricultural work in Germany: report immediately to your Vogt"

In occupied Poland, there was no official collaboration at either the political or economic level. The occupying powers intended permanent elimination of Polish governing structures and ruling elites and therefore did not seek this kind of cooperation. The Poles were not given positions of significant authority. The vast majority of the prewar citizenry collaborating with the Nazis came from the German minority in Poland, the members of which were offered several classes of the German Volksdeutsche ID. During the war, there were about 3 million former Polish citizens of German origin who signed the official Deutsche Volksliste.

Depending on a definition of collaboration (and of a Polish citizen, including the ethnicity and minority status considerations), scholars estimate the number of "Polish collaborators" at around several thousand in a population of about 35 million. The estimate is based primarily on the number of death sentences for treason by the Underground court of the Polish Underground State. The underground courts sentenced 10,000 Poles, including 200 death sentences. John Connelly quoted a Polish historian (Leszek Gondek) calling the phenomenon of Polish collaboration "marginal" and wrote that "only relatively small percentage of Polish population engaged in activities that may be described as collaboration when seen against the backdrop of European and world history". Some researchers give much higher numbers of collaborators, especially when it comes to denouncing Jews.

In October 1939, the Nazis ordered a mobilization of the prewar Polish police to the service of the occupational authorities. The policemen were to report for duty or face the death penalty. The so-called Blue Police was formed. At its peak in 1943, it numbered around 16,000. Its primary task was to act as a regular police force and to deal with criminal activities, but they were also used by the Germans in combating smuggling and patrolling the Jewish ghettos. Many individuals in the Blue Police followed German orders reluctantly, often disobeyed them or even risked death acting against them. Many members of the Blue Police were double agents for the Polish resistance; a large percentage cooperated with the Home Army. Some of its officers were ultimately awarded the Righteous Among the Nations awards for saving Jews. However, the moral position of Polish policemen were often compromised by a necessity for cooperation, or even collaboration, with the occupier. According to Timothy Snyder, acting in their capacity as a collaborationist force, the Blue Police may have killed more than 50,000 Jews. The police assisted the Nazis at tasks such as rounding up Poles for forced labor in Germany.

During Nazi Germany's Operation Barbarossa against the Soviet Union in June 1941, the German forces quickly overran the eastern half of Poland controlled by the Red Army since 1939. New Reichskommissariats were formed across the Kresy macroregion. As the Soviet-German war progressed, the Home Army fought against both invaders, including the Soviet partisans, who often considered the Polish underground as enemies on a par with the Germans and from June 1943 were authorized by their command to denounce them to the Nazis. Due to the intensified, by the fall of 1943, warfare between the Home Army and the Soviet partisans in Poland, a few Polish commanders accepted weapons and ammunition from the Germans to fight the communist forces. In 1944, the Germans clandestinely armed some regional AK units operating in the areas of Navahrudak and Vilnius. This AK-Nazi cooperation was condemned by General Kazimierz Sosnkowski, commander-in-chief in the Polish Government-in-Exile, who ordered the responsible officers court-martialed. The AK turned these weapons against the Nazis during the Operation Ostra Brama. Such arrangements were purely tactical and did not evidence the type of ideological collaboration as shown by the Vichy regime in France, the Quisling regime in Norway, or the OUN leadership in Distrikt Galizien. Tadeusz Piotrowski quotes Joseph Rothschild as saying: "The Polish Home Army (AK) was by and large untainted by collaboration" and that "the honor of AK as a whole is beyond reproach".

The former prime minister of Poland Leon Kozłowski was released from a Soviet prison and crossed into the German zone of occupation in October 1941. However, his reasons and the context of his action are not known. Historian Gunnar S. Paulsson estimates that in Warsaw the number of Polish citizens collaborating with the Nazis during the occupation might have been around "1 or 2 percent". Fugitive Jews (and members of the resistance) were handed over to the Gestapo by the so-called "szmalcowniks", who received financial rewards.

Soon after the German takeover of the town of Jedwabne in July 1941, the Jedwabne pogrom took place. The exact circumstances of what happened during the pogrom are not clear and vigorously debated. According to the investigation by the Institute of National Remembrance, completed in 2002, at least 340 members of Jewish families were rounded up by or in the presence of the German Ordnungspolizei. They were locked in a barn which was then set on fire by Polish residents of Jedwabne. By several accounts, this was done under German duress.

== Resistance in Poland ==
=== Armed resistance and the Underground State ===
The Polish resistance movement in World War II was the largest in all of occupied Europe. Resistance to the German occupation began almost at once and included guerrilla warfare. Centrally commanded military conspiratorial activity was started with the Service for Poland's Victory (Służba Zwycięstwu Polski) organization, established on 27 September 1939. Poland's prewar political parties also resumed activity. The Service was replaced by the Polish Government-in-Exile in Paris with the Union of Armed Struggle (Związek Walki Zbrojnej), placed under the command of General Kazimierz Sosnkowski, a minister in that government.

In June 1940 Władysław Sikorski, prime minister in exile and chief military commander, appointed General Stefan Rowecki, resident in Poland, to head the Union. Bataliony Chłopskie, a partisan force of the peasant movement, was active from August 1940 and reached 150,000 participants by June 1944. The Home Army (Armia Krajowa or AK), loyal to the Government-in-Exile then in London and a military arm of the Polish Underground State, was formed from the Union of Armed Struggle and other groups in February 1942. In July its forces approached 200,000 sworn soldiers, who undertook many successful anti-Nazi operations. Gwardia Ludowa and its successor Armia Ludowa were the much smaller leftist formations, backed by the Soviet Union and controlled by the Polish Workers' Party. The National Military Organization was a military structure of the National Party. Its forces split in 1942 and again in 1944, with most joining the Home Army and the rest forming the ultra-nationalist National Armed Forces that operated separately. By mid-1944, partial coalescing of several underground formations had taken place and the AK membership may have reached some 400,000, but its supply of arms remained quite limited. According to Czubiński, the AK counted 300,000 committed soldiers, who performed about 230,000 actions of sabotage and diversion throughout the war. According to Zbigniew Mikołejko, 200,000 soldiers and civilians participated in AK activities during the war. However, the Home Army's resources were so scarce that it could effectively equip only about 30,000 fighters in the spring of 1944. Partisan attacks were also hampered by the Nazi policy of retaliation against the civilian population, including mass executions of randomly rounded up individuals. The occupiers would typically kill one hundred Polish civilians for each German killed by the resistance. The AK encountered difficulties establishing itself in the eastern provinces (Kresy) and in the western areas annexed to Germany. General Rowecki was betrayed and arrested by the Gestapo in June 1943.

The Underground State originated in April 1940, when the exile government planned to establish its three "delegates" in occupied Poland: for the General Government, the German-annexed areas and the Soviet-occupied zone. After the fall of France, the structure was revised to include only a single delegate. The Underground State was endorsed by Poland's main prewar political blocks, including the peasant, socialist, nationalist and Catholic parties and absorbed many supporters of the Sanation rule, humbled by the 1939 defeat. The parties established clandestine cooperation in February 1940 and dedicated themselves to a future postwar parliamentary democracy in Poland. From autumn 1940, the "State" was led by a delegate (Cyryl Ratajski) appointed by the Polish government in London. The Underground State maintained the continuity of the Polish statehood in Poland and conducted a broad range of political, military, administrative, social, cultural, educational and other activities, within practical limits of the conspiratorial environment. In November 1942 Jan Karski, a special emissary, was sent to London and later to Washington, to warn the Western Allies of the imminent extermination of the Jews in Poland. Karski was able to convey his personal observations to American Jewish leaders and he met with President Roosevelt.

=== After Operation Barbarossa ===
Leopold Trepper, a Polish-Jewish communist, worked as a master spy and was the chief of the Red Orchestra network in Western Europe. He became aware and informed Stalin of the Nazi-planned Operation Barbarossa, but the Soviet leader did not take his – nor the similar alerts from his top intelligence officer in Japan, Richard Sorge – advance warnings seriously regarding the imminent Nazi invasion.

In Poland, the communists, more active after the 1941 Nazi invasion of the Soviet Union, and the right wing extremists, neither joined the broad coalition nor recognized the Government Delegate. The situation of the Polish armed resistance was made more difficult by the fact that the Allies now assigned Poland to the Soviet sphere of operations, and Britain refrained from or limited direct support of resistance movements in central-eastern Europe.

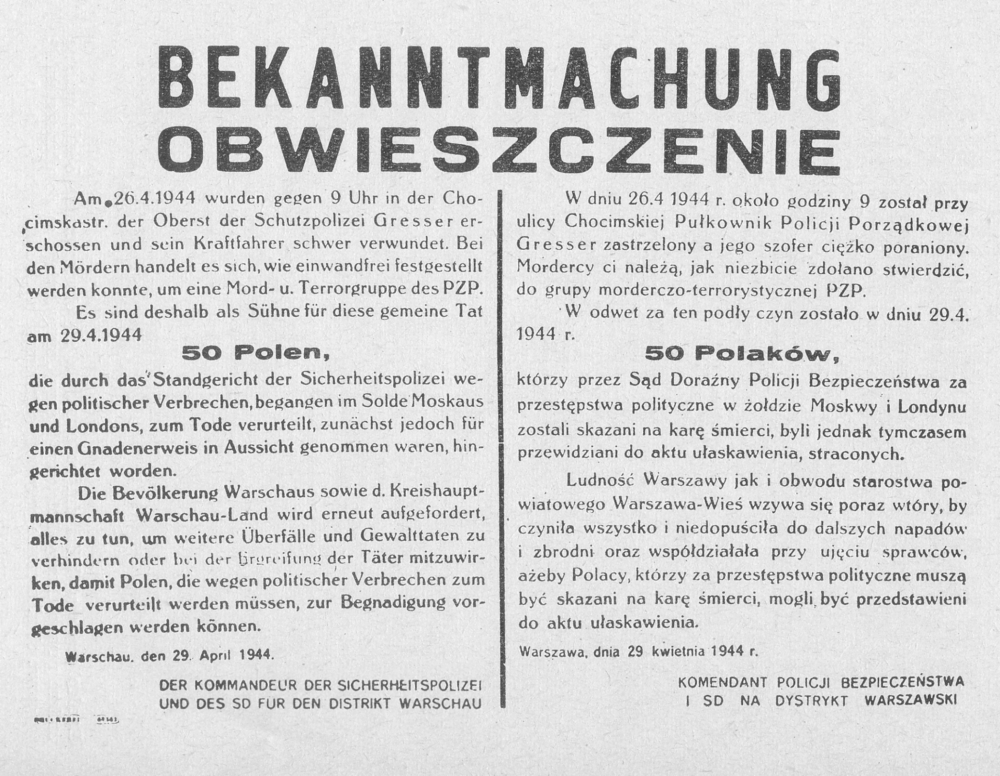
An announcement of fifty Poles tried and sentenced to death by a Standgericht in retaliation for the assassination of one German policeman, 1944

After Operation Barbarossa, the Soviet partisans also developed and became militarily active in the General Government. They were generally aligned with the Polish leftist Gwardia Ludowa and posed a significant threat to the authority of the AK, which had not adopted a policy of more direct and widespread confrontations with the Nazis until 1943. The Soviet partisans were especially prevalent in Belarus and elsewhere in Kresy.^{[y]} The presence of the various partisan formations, who often represented irreconcilable political orientations, followed contradictory military strategies and were mutually hostile, including also the Jewish, National Armed Forces, Bataliony Chłopskie (some right-, some left-wing), and of criminal armed bands preying on local populations, led to armed clashes, assassinations, murder, and a climate of chaos and uncertainty, as the Soviet armies, having established their superiority on the Eastern Front, approached Poland's prewar eastern boundaries.

With Stalin's encouragement, Polish communist institutions rival to the Government-in-Exile and the Underground State were established. They included the Polish Workers' Party (from January 1942) and the State National Council in occupied Poland, as well as the Union of Polish Patriots in the Soviet Union.

The Jewish Combat Organization groups undertook armed resistance activities in 1943. In April, the Germans began deporting the remaining Jews from the Warsaw Ghetto, provoking the Warsaw Ghetto Uprising (19 April–16 May). The Polish-Jewish leaders knew that the rising would be crushed but they preferred to die fighting than wait to be murdered in the extermination camps.

In August 1943 and March 1944, the Underground State announced its long-term plan, partially designed to counter the attractiveness of some of the communist proposals. It promised parliamentary democracy, land reform, nationalization of the industrial base, more powerful trade unions, demands for territorial compensation from Germany, and re-establishment of the pre-1939 eastern border. Thus, the main difference between the Underground State and the communists, in terms of politics, amounted not to radical economic and social reforms, which were advocated by both sides, but to their attitudes towards national sovereignty, borders, and Polish-Soviet relations.

=== Operation Tempest and the Warsaw Uprising ===
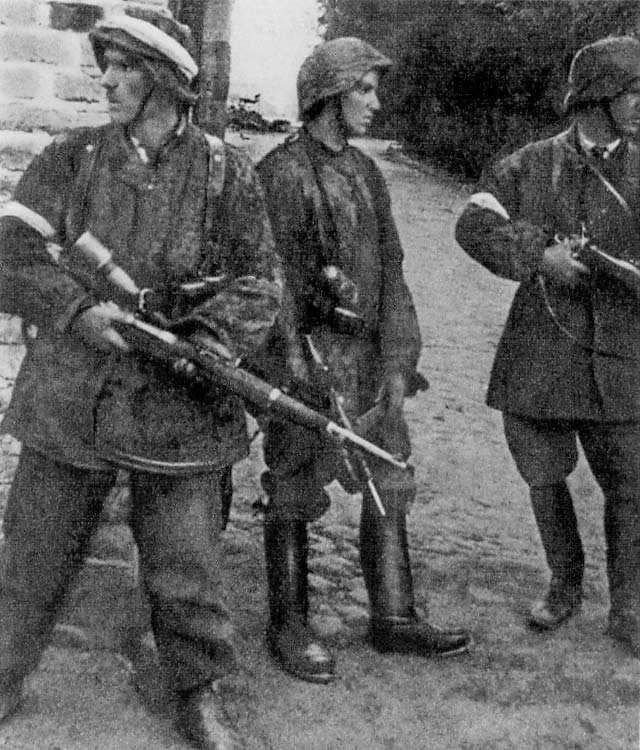
Battalion Zośka soldiers in Wola during the Warsaw Uprising

In early 1943, the Home Army built up its forces in preparation for a national uprising. The situation was soon complicated by the continuing strength of Germany and the threat presented by the advance of the Soviets, who promoted a territorial and political vision of a future Poland that was at odds with what the Polish leaders were striving for. The Council of National Unity, a quasi-parliament, was instituted in occupied Poland on 9 January 1944; it was chaired by Kazimierz Pużak, a socialist. The plan for the establishment of Polish state authority ahead of the arrival of the Soviets was code-named Operation Tempest and began in late 1943. Its major implemented elements were the campaign of the 27th Home Army Infantry Division in Volhynia (from February 1944), Operation Ostra Brama in Vilnius and the Warsaw Uprising. In most Polish-Soviet encounters, the Soviets and their allies ultimately opted not to cooperate with the Home Army and ruthlessly imposed their rule; in the case of the Warsaw Uprising, the Soviets waited for the Germans to defeat the insurgents. The forces of the Polish right-wing called for stopping the war against Germany and concentrating on fighting the communists and the Soviet threat.

As the Operation Tempest failed to achieve its goals in the disputed eastern provinces, the Soviets demanded that the Home Army be disbanded there and its underground soldiers enlist in the Soviet-allied First Polish Army. The AK commander Tadeusz Bór-Komorowski complied, disbanding in late July 1944 his formations east of the Bug River and ordering the fighters to join the army led by Zygmunt Berling. Some partisans obeyed, others refused, and many were arrested and persecuted by the Soviets.

In the summer of 1944, as the Soviet forces approached Warsaw, the AK prepared an uprising in the German-occupied capital city with the political intention of preempting an imposition of a communist government in Poland. The Polish supreme commander in London, General Sosnkowski, was opposed to the AK strategy of waging open warfare against the German forces on the eve of the arrival of the Soviet armies (the effective scope of those military undertakings was in any case limited because of insufficient resources and external pressures), as self-destructive for the AK. He dispatched General Leopold Okulicki to Poland in May 1944, instructing him not to allow such actions to proceed. Once in Poland, Okulicki pursued his own ideas instead and in Warsaw he became the most ardent proponent of an uprising there, pushing for a quick commencement of anti-German hostilities. Prime Minister Stanisław Mikołajczyk, who thought an uprising in Warsaw would improve his bargaining position in the upcoming negotiations with Stalin, cabled on 27 July Jan Stanisław Jankowski, the government delegate, declaring the Polish Government-in-Exile's authorization for the issuance of an uprising proclamation by the Polish underground authorities in Warsaw, at a moment chosen by them. To some of the underground commanders, the German collapse and the entry of the Soviets appeared imminent, and the AK, led by Bór-Komorowski, launched the Warsaw Uprising on 1 August. The insurgents' equipment and supplies would suffice for only several days of fighting and the uprising was planned to last no longer than that. On 3 August Mikołajczyk, conferring with Stalin in Moscow, announced an upcoming "freeing of Warsaw any day now" and asked for military help. Stalin promised help for the insurgents, but noted that the Soviet armies were still separated from Warsaw by powerful and thus far undefeated concentrations of enemy troops.

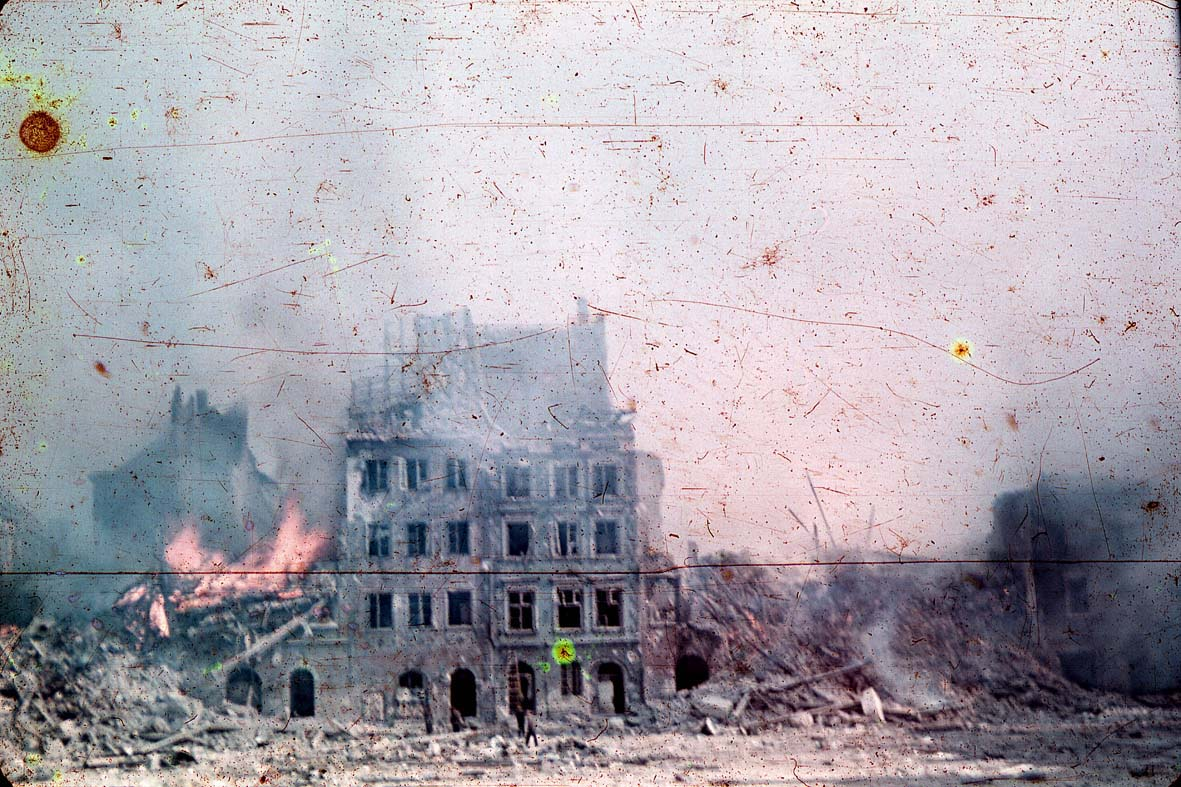
Warsaw Uprising in the Old Town

In Warsaw, the Germans turned out to be still overwhelmingly strong and the Soviet leaders and their forces nearby, not consulted in advance, contrary to the insurgents' expectations gave little assistance. Stalin had no interest in the uprising's success and following the failure of the talks with Mikołajczyk, the Soviet TASS information agency stated in the 13 August broadcast that "the responsibility for the events in Warsaw rests entirely with the Polish émigré circles in London". The Poles appealed to the Western Allies for help. The Royal Air Force and the Polish Air Force based in Italy dropped some arms but little could be accomplished without Soviet involvement. Urged by the communist Polish Committee of National Liberation and the Western leaders, Stalin eventually allowed airdrops for the Warsaw insurgents and provided limited military assistance. Soviet supply flights continued from 13 to 29 September and an American relief operation was allowed to land on Soviet-controlled territory, but by that time the area under insurgent control had been greatly reduced and much of the dropped material was lost. General Berling's failed but costly attempt to support the fighters on 15–23 September using his Polish forces (First Army units crossed the Vistula but were slaughtered in a battle over the bridgehead) derailed Berling's own career.^{[z]} The Soviets halted their western push at the Vistula for several months, directing their attention south toward the Balkans.

In the Polish capital, the AK formations initially took over considerable portions of the city, but from 4 August they had to limit their efforts to defense and the territory under Polish control kept shrinking. The Warsaw AK district had 50,000 members, of whom perhaps 10% had firearms. They faced a reinforced German special corps of 22,000 largely SS troops and various regular army and auxiliary units, up to 50,000 soldiers total. The Polish command had planned to establish a provisional Polish administration to greet the arriving Soviets but came nowhere close to meeting this goal. The Germans and their allies engaged in the mass slaughter of the civilian population, including between 40,000 and 50,000 massacred in the districts of Wola, Ochota and Mokotów. The SS and auxiliary units were recruited from the Soviet Army deserters (the Dirlewanger Brigade and the R.O.N.A. Brigade) were particularly brutal.

After the uprising's surrender on 2 October, the AK fighters were given the status of prisoners-of-war by the Germans but the civilian population remained unprotected and the survivors were punished and evacuated. The Polish casualties are estimated to be at least 150,000 civilians killed, in addition to the fewer than 20,000 AK soldiers. The German forces lost over two thousand men. Under three thousand of the First Polish Army soldiers died in the failed rescue attempt. 150,000 civilians were sent to labour camps in the Reich or shipped to concentration camps such as Ravensbrück, Auschwitz, and Mauthausen. The city was almost totally demolished by the German punitive bombing raids, but only after being systematically looted of works of art and other property, which were then taken to Germany. General Sosnkowski, who criticized the Allied inaction, was relieved of his command. Following the defeat of Operation Tempest and the Warsaw Uprising, the remaining resistance in Poland (the Underground State and the AK) ended up greatly destabilized, weakened and with damaged reputation, at the moment when the international decision-making processes impacting Poland's future were about to enter their final phase. The Warsaw Uprising allowed the Germans to largely destroy the AK as a fighting force, but the main beneficiaries were the Soviets and the communists, who were able to impose a communist government on postwar Poland with reduced risk of armed resistance. The Soviets and the allied First Polish Army, having resumed their offensive, entered Warsaw on 17 January 1945. In January 1945, the Home Army was officially disbanded. The AK, placed under General Okulicki after General Bór-Komorowski became a German prisoner, was in late 1944 extremely demoralized. Okulicki issued the order dissolving the AK on 19 January, having been authorized to do so by President Raczkiewicz. The civilian Underground State structure remained in existence and hoped to participate in the future government of Poland.

== The Holocaust in Poland ==
=== Jews in Poland ===
Despite the various forms of anti-Jewish harassment that took place in late prewar Poland, the Jewish community there was the largest in Europe and thrived. Jews constituted a large percentage and often the majority of the urban bourgeoisie and urban poor in many towns.

In 1938, the Polish government passed a law withdrawing Polish citizenship from Poles who had lived outside of Poland for over five years. The law was aimed at and used to prevent the tens of thousands of Polish Jews in Austria and Germany, threatened or expelled by the Nazi regime, from returning to Poland.

In December 1939, the Polish diplomat and resistance fighter Jan Karski wrote that, in his opinion, some Poles felt contempt and dismay in observing the barbarian anti-Jewish deeds of the Nazis, while others watched these deeds with interest and admiration. He warned of the threat of demoralization of broad segments of Polish society because of the narrow common ground that the Nazis shared with many ethnic Poles on the Jewish issue. Local antisemitism, encouraged by the Nazis and augmented by their propaganda, resulted during the war in many instances of violence directed against Jews. According to Laurence Weinbaum, who quotes Aleksander Smolar, "in wartime Polish society ... there was no stigma of collaboration attached to acting against the Jews". According to the writer and researcher Anna Bikont, most Jews who escaped the Nazi ghettos could not have survived the war even if they had been in possession of material resources and social connections because ethnic Poles diligently and persistently excluded them from Polish society.

=== Nazi persecution and elimination of ghettos ===
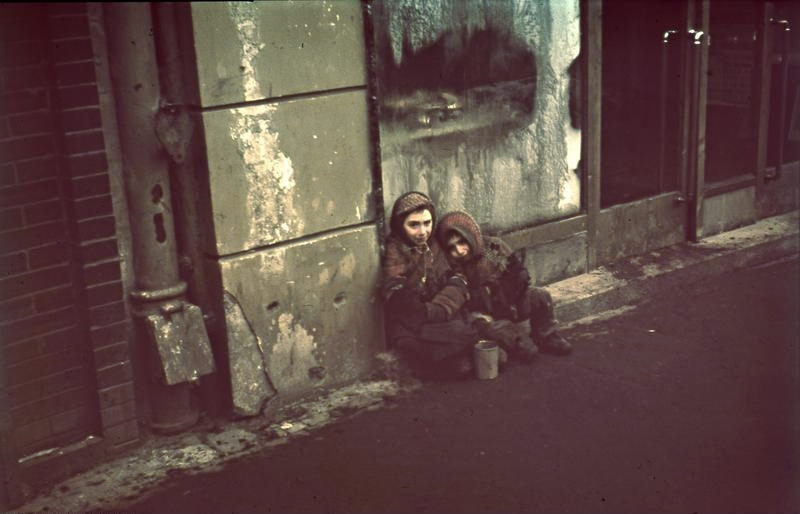
Starving Jewish children in the Warsaw Ghetto (1940–1943), during the German occupation of Poland

Persecution of the Jews by the Nazi occupation government, particularly in the urban areas, began immediately after the commencement of the occupation. In the first year and a half, the Germans confined themselves to stripping the Jews of their property, herding them into ghettos (approximately 400 were established beginning in October 1939) and putting them into forced labor in war-related industries. Thousands of Jews survived by managing to stay outside the ghettos. During this period, a Jewish so-called community leadership, the Judenrat, was required by the Germans in every town with a substantial Jewish population and was able to some extent to bargain with the Germans. Already during this initial stage tens of thousands of Jews died because of factors such as overcrowding, disease and starvation. Others survived, supported by the Jewish social self-help agency and the informal trading and smuggling of food and necessities into the ghettos.

The ghettos were eliminated when their inhabitants were shipped to slave labor and extermination camps. The Łódź Ghetto, one of the largest and most isolated, lasted also the longest (from April 1940 until August 1944), because goods were manufactured there for the Nazi war economy. The deportations from the Warsaw Ghetto began in July 1942. They were facilitated by collaborators, such as the Jewish police, and opposed by the resistance, including the Jewish Combat Organization (ŻOB). An estimated 500,000 Jews died in the ghettos, and a further 250,000 were murdered during their elimination.

While many Jews reacted to their fate with disbelief and passivity, revolts did take place, including at the Treblinka and Sobibór camps and at a number of ghettos. The leftist ŻOB was established in the Warsaw Ghetto in July 1942 and was soon commanded by Mordechai Anielewicz. As the final liquidation of the remaining ghetto population was commenced by the Nazis on 19 April 1943, hundreds of Jewish fighters revolted. The Warsaw Ghetto Uprising lasted until May 16 and resulted in thousands of Jews killed and tens of thousands transported to Treblinka. The Polish underground and some Warsaw residents assisted the ghetto fighters.

=== Extermination of Jews ===
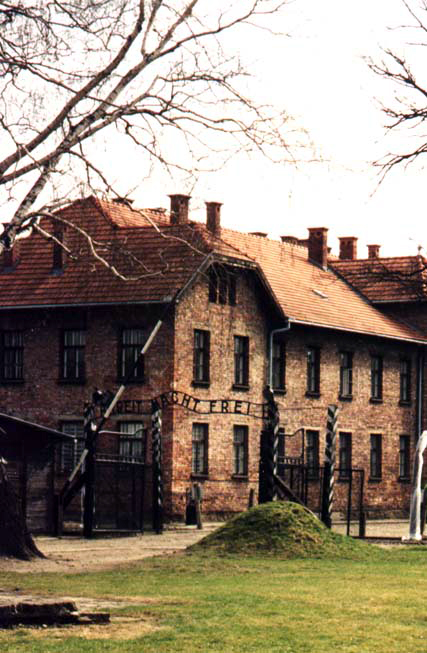
The entrance to the Auschwitz I concentration camp, established by Nazi Germany in Poland

After the German attack on the Soviet Union in June 1941, special extermination squads (the Einsatzgruppen) were organised to kill Jews in the areas of eastern Poland which had been annexed by the Soviets in 1939. The Nazi anti-Jewish persecutions assumed the characteristics and proportions of genocide, and, from the fall of 1941, of the organized Final Solution. The Chełmno extermination camp near Łódź was put into operation first. Beginning on 8 December 1941, at least 150,000 Jews were murdered there.

About two million Jews were killed after the beginning of Operation Barbarossa, mostly by the Germans, in areas where Soviet presence was replaced with the Nazi occupation. Especially in the early weeks of the German offensive, many thousands of Jews were murdered by members of local communities in the western parts of the previous Soviet zone, such as the Baltic countries, eastern Poland, and western Ukraine. The pogroms, encouraged by the Germans, were sometimes perpetrated primarily or exclusively by the locals, including Lithuanians, Belarusians, Ukrainians and Poles.

In 1942, the Germans engaged in the systematic killing of the Jews, beginning with the Jewish population of the General Government. The General Government had the largest in Europe population of Jews and was designated to be the primary location of Nazi installations for the elimination of Jews. Six extermination camps (Auschwitz, Bełżec, Chełmno, Majdanek, Sobibór and Treblinka) were established in which the most extreme measure of the Holocaust, the mass murder of millions of Jews from Poland and other countries, was carried out between 1942 and 1945. Nearly three million Polish Jews were murdered, most in death camps during the so-called Operation Reinhard.

Prisoners of many nationalities were kept at Auschwitz and parts of the complex were used as a brutal and deadly labor camp, but about 80% of the arriving Jews were murdered upon arrival (some 900,000 people). Auschwitz, unlike Treblinka or Bełżec, was not solely a death camp, but it likely had the highest number of Jewish victims.^{[k]} Of Poland's prewar Jewish population of about or above three million, about or above 10% survived the war. Davies wrote of some 150,000 Jews surviving the war in Poland. Between 50,000 and 100,000 survived in hiding helped by other Poles according to Kochanski, between 30,000 and 60,000 according to Sowa. Dawid Warszawski wrote of estimated 50,000 Jews surviving in Poland, a majority of them in camps. According to historian Jan Grabowski, about 35,000 Polish Jews survived the war in Poland, but he counts the Jewish deaths caused directly or indirectly by ethnic Poles in hundreds of thousands (victims of the Blue Police and of civilians). About 250,000 Jews escaped German-occupied Poland and went mostly to the Soviet Union. At Treblinka (a site that, together with Auschwitz, produced the highest number of Jewish victims) and other extermination locations, Heinrich Himmler ordered measures intended to conceal the Nazi crimes and prevent their future detection.

The Romani people were also marked by the Nazis for immediate elimination. Of the 80,000 Romani living in Poland, 30,000 survived the German occupation.

=== Efforts to save Jews ===
Some Poles tried to save Jews. In September 1942, the Provisional Committee to Aid Jews (Tymczasowy Komitet Pomocy Żydom) was founded on the initiative of Zofia Kossak-Szczucka. This body later became the council to Aid Jews (Rada Pomocy Żydom), known by the code-name Żegota and under the auspices of the Government Delegation for Poland. Żegota is particularly noted for its children-saving operation led by Irena Sendler. Jewish children were smuggled out of the Warsaw Ghetto before the ghetto was eliminated and thus saved. (See also an example of the village that helped Jews: Markowa). Because of such actions, Polish citizens have the highest number of Righteous Among the Nations awards at the Yad Vashem Museum. Thousands of Jews were saved with the help of the Greek Catholic Metropolitan Andrey Sheptytsky in western Ukraine.

Helping Jews was extremely dangerous because people involved exposed themselves and their families to Nazi punishment by death. The official policies of the Polish Government-in-Exile and the Polish Underground State called for providing assistance to the Jews. However, they reacted to tragic events with delays and were hampered by what General Stefan Rowecki, chief of the armed underground, characterized as overwhelmingly antisemitic attitudes of Polish society. Gangs and individuals denounced Jews and preyed on Jewish victims. Right-wing organizations, such as the National Radical Camp (ONR) and the National Armed Forces (NSZ), remained virulently antisemitic throughout the occupation period.

== Polish-Ukrainian conflict ==
=== Background ===
The bloody ethnic conflict exploded during World War II in areas of today's western Ukraine, inhabited at that time by Ukrainians and a Polish minority (and until recently by Jews, most of whom had been killed by the Nazis before 1943). The Ukrainians blamed the Poles for preventing the emergence of their national state as a result of the outcomes of their conflict at the end of World War I and for Poland's nationality policies (such as military colonization in Kresy). Ukraininan partisans therefore undertook a campaign of terror during the interwar years, led by the Organization of Ukrainian Nationalists (OUN). Under Piłsudski and his successors the Polish state authorities responded with harsh pacification measures. The events that unfolded in the 1940s were a legacy of this bitterness and also a result of other factors, such as the activities of Nazi Germany and the Soviet Union. Ukrainians, generally assigned by the Nazis the same inferior status as Poles, in many practical respects received more favorable treatment. However, the Germans thwarted the Ukrainian attempts to establish a Ukrainian state, imprisoned Ukrainian leaders, and split the occupied lands that Ukrainians considered theirs into two administrative units. Following the Soviet victory at Stalingrad, the Ukrainian nationalists feared a repeat of the post-World War I scenario: a power vacuum left by the exhausted great powers and a Polish armed takeover of western Ukraine. Aiming for a country without any Poles or Polish interests left, the Ukrainian Insurgent Army (UPA) undertook to create an ethnically homogenous Ukrainian society by physically eliminating the Poles. The German occupiers, whose long-standing policy was to aggravate further the Polish-Ukrainian enmity, for the most part, did not intervene in the resulting campaigns of ethnic cleansing.

=== Ethnic cleansing ===
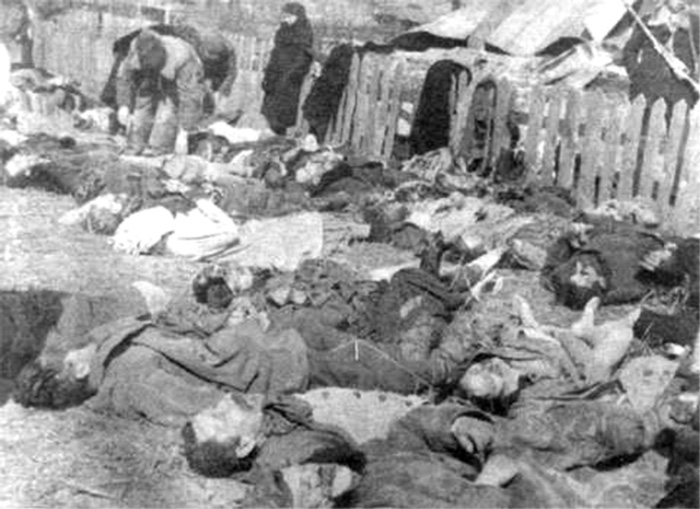
Victims of a massacre committed by the UPA in the village of Lipniki in Volhynia, 1943

The wartime Polish-Ukrainian conflict commenced with the massacres of Poles in Volhynia (Polish: Rzeź wołyńska, literally: Volhynian slaughter), a campaign of ethnic mass murder in western Reichskommissariat Ukraine, which was the Polish Volhynian Voivodeship before the war. The entire conflict took place mainly between late March 1943 and August 1947, extending beyond World War II. The actions, orchestrated and conducted largely by the UPA together with other Ukrainian groups and local Ukrainian peasants in three former Polish provinces (voivodeships), resulted in between 50,000 and 60,000 Polish civilians killed in Volhynia alone. Other major regions of the slaughter of Poles were eastern Galicia (20,000–25,000 killed) and southeastern Lublin province (4,000–5,000 killed). The peak of the massacres took place in July and August 1943, when Dmytro Klyachkivsky, a senior UPA commander, ordered the extermination of the entire ethnically Polish population between 16 and 60 years of age. Hundreds of thousands of Poles fled the affected areas. The massacres committed by the UPA led to ethnic cleansing and retaliatory killings by Poles against local Ukrainians both east and west of the Curzon Line. Estimates of the number of Ukrainians killed in Polish reprisals vary from 10,000 to 20,000 in all areas affected by the conflict. Ukrainian historians give higher numbers for the Ukrainian losses. The reprisal killings were committed by the Home Army, Bataliony Chłopskie, and Polish self-defense units. They were restrained from mounting indiscriminate attacks by the Polish Government-in-Exile, whose goal was to retake and govern western Ukraine after the war. As a result of the fierce fighting that took place in May and June 1944, a Polish-Ukrainian front had been established along the Huczwa River with several thousand participants on each side; it ceased to exist only with the arrival of the Soviet Army.

The ethnic cleansing and securing ethnic homogeneity reached its full scale with the post-war Soviet and Polish communist removal of the Polish and Ukrainian populations to the respective sides of the Poland-Soviet Ukraine border and the implementation of the Operation Vistula, the dispersing of Ukrainians still remaining in Poland in remote regions of the country. Due in part to the successive occupations of the region, ethnic Poles and Ukrainians were brutally pitted against each other, first under the German occupation, and later under the Soviet occupation. Tens or hundreds of thousands on both sides (estimates differ widely) lost their lives over the course of this conflict.

== Government-in-Exile, communist victory ==
=== Polish government in France and Britain ===
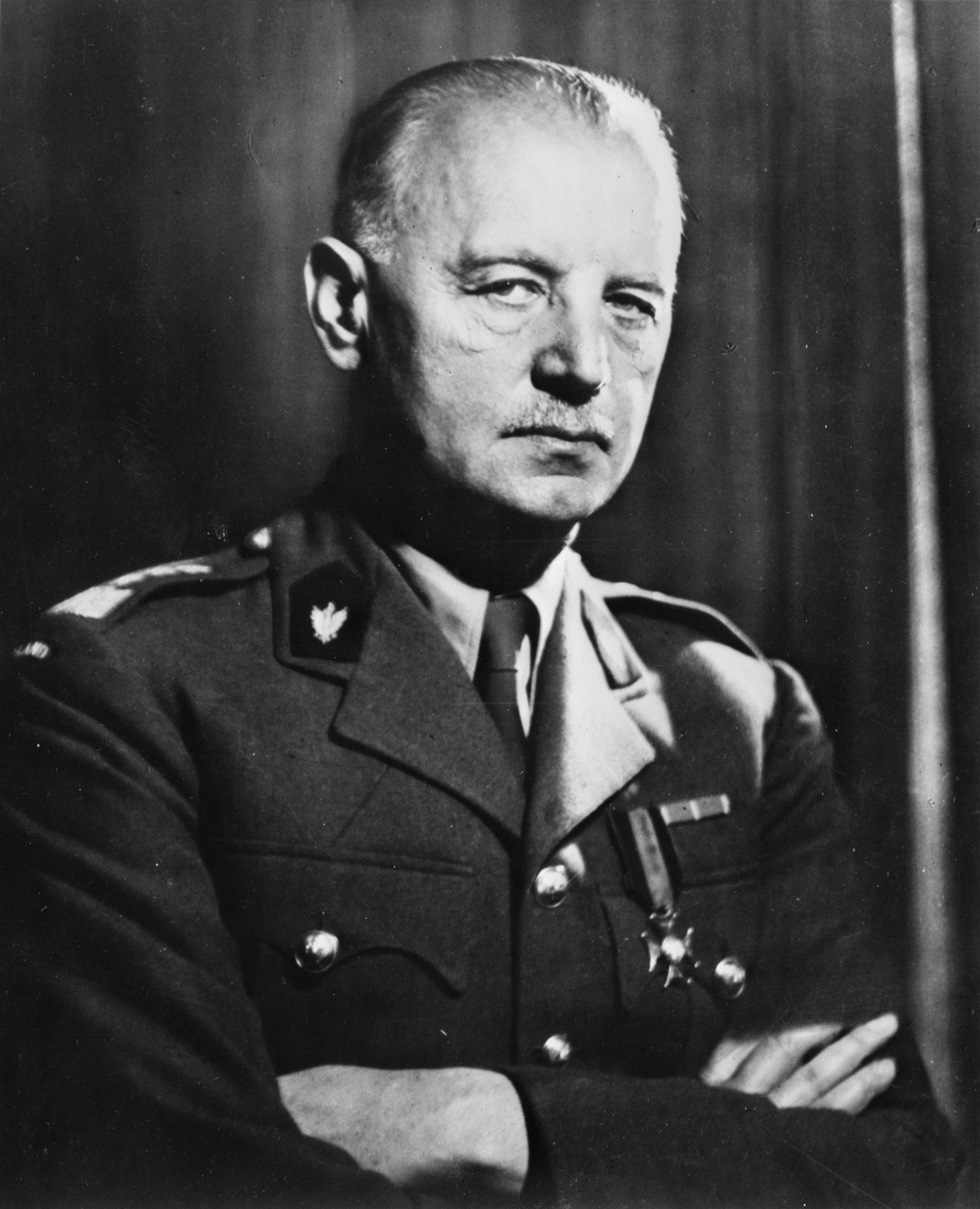
Władysław Sikorski

Because of the Polish government leaders' internment in Romania, a practically new government was assembled in Paris as a Government-in-Exile. Under French pressure, on 30 September 1939 Władysław Raczkiewicz was appointed as president and General Władysław Sikorski became prime minister and commander-in-chief of the Polish armed forces, reconstructed in the West and as an underground activity in occupied Poland. The exile government was authorized by the Sanation government leaders interned in Romania and was conceived as a continuation of the prewar government, but was beset by strong tensions between the sympathizers of the Sanation regime, led by President Raczkiewicz and General Kazimierz Sosnkowski, and anti-Sanation opposition, led by Prime Minister Sikorski, General Józef Haller, and politicians from the Polish parties persecuted in the past in Sanation Poland. The 1935 April Constitution of Poland, previously rejected by the opposition as illegitimate, was retained for the sake of continuity of the national government. President Raczkiewicz agreed not to use his extraordinary powers, granted by that constitution, except in agreement with the prime minister. There were calls for a war tribunal prosecution of the top leaders deemed responsible for the 1939 defeat. Sikorski blocked such attempts, but allowed forms of persecution of many exiles, people seen as compromised by their past role in Poland's ruling circles.

A quasi-parliamentary and advisory National Council was established in December 1939. It was chaired by the Polish senior statesman Ignacy Paderewski. The vice-chairmen were Stanisław Mikołajczyk, a peasant movement leader, Herman Lieberman, a socialist, and Tadeusz Bielecki, a nationalist.

The war was expected to end soon in an Allied victory and the government's goal was to reestablish the Polish state in pre-1939 borders, augmented by East Prussia, Danzig, and the planned significant adjustments of the western border, all to be obtained at the expense of Germany. The government considered Poland to be in a state of war with Germany, but not with the Soviet Union, the relationship with which was not clearly specified.^{[f]} The eastern border problem placed the Polish government on a collision course not only with the Soviets but also with the Western Allies, whose many politicians, including Winston Churchill, kept thinking of Poland's proper eastern boundary in terms of the "Curzon Line". The exile government in Paris was recognized by France, Britain, and many other countries and was highly popular in occupied Poland. By the spring of 1940, an 82,000 strong army was mobilized in France and elsewhere. Polish soldiers and ships fought in the Norwegian Campaign.

France was invaded and defeated by Germany. The Polish Army units, dispersed and attached to various French formations, fought in the defense of France and covered the French retreat, losing 1,400 men. On 18 June 1940, Sikorski went to England and made arrangements for the evacuation of the Polish government and armed forces to the British Isles. Only 19,000 soldiers and airmen could be evacuated, which amounted to less than a quarter of the Polish military personnel established in France.^{[h]}

The infighting within the exile government circles continued. On July 18 President Raczkiewicz dismissed Prime Minister Sikorski because of the disagreements concerning possible cooperation with the Soviet Union. Sikorski's supporters in the Polish military and the British government intervened and Sikorski was reinstated, but the internal conflict among the Polish émigrés intensified.

Polish pilots became famous because of their exceptional contributions during the Battle of Britain. Polish sailors, on Polish and British ships, served with distinction in the Battle of the Atlantic. Polish soldiers participated in the North African Campaign.

=== Polish Army's evacuation from the Soviet Union ===
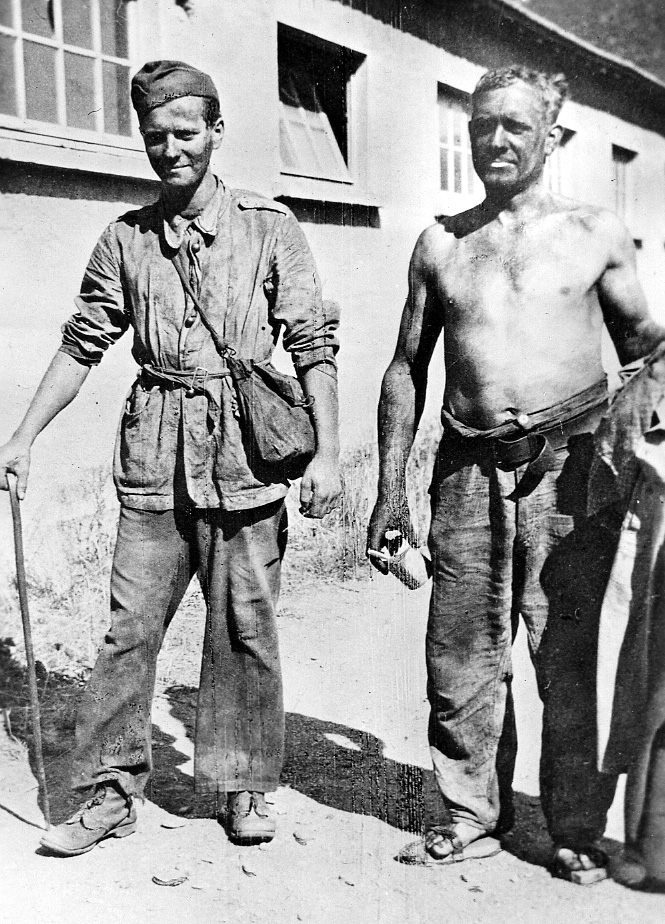
Polish volunteers to Anders' Army, released from a Soviet POW camp

After Germany attacked the Soviet Union on 22 June 1941, the British government allied itself with the Soviet Union on 12 July and Churchill pressed Sikorski to also reach an agreement with the Soviets. The Sikorski–Mayski treaty was signed on 30 July despite strong resistance from Sikorski's opponents in the exile government (three cabinet ministers resigned, including Foreign Minister August Zaleski and General Sosnkowski) and Polish-Soviet diplomatic relations were restored. The territorial aspects of the Molotov–Ribbentrop Pact had been invalidated. Polish soldiers and others imprisoned in the Soviet Union since 1939 were released and the formation of a Polish army there was agreed, intended to fight on the Eastern Front, help the Red Army to liberate Poland and establish a sovereign Polish state. Other issues, including Poland's borders, were left to be determined in the future. A Polish-Soviet military agreement was signed on 14 August; it attempted to specify the political and operational conditions for the functioning of the Polish army. Sikorski's preference, stated around 1 September, was for the Polish army to be deployed in defense of the Caucasus oil fields, which would allow it to maintain close contacts with the British forces.

To resolve the various problems that surfaced during the recruitment and training of the Polish divisions and concerning their planned use, Sikorski went to the Soviet Union, where he negotiated with Stalin. The two leaders announced a common declaration "of friendship and mutual assistance" on 4 December 1941. But political and practical difficulties continued; for example the Soviets were unable or unwilling to properly feed and supply the Poles. Ultimately, with British help, the chief of the Polish army in the Soviet Union Władysław Anders and Sikorski obtained Stalin's permission to move the force to the Middle East. According to one source, 78,631 Polish soldiers and tens of thousands of civilians left the Soviet Union and went to Iran in the spring and summer of 1942. The majority of General Anders' men formed the II Corps in the Middle East, from where the corps was transported to Italy in early 1944, to participate in the Italian Campaign. Its 60,000 soldiers grew to 100,000 by mid-1945. Overall, the Polish soldiers were taken from where they conceivably could have had enhanced the faltering standing of the Polish Government-in-Exile and influenced the post-war fate of Poland, to where, as it turned out, they could not.^{[g]}

=== In the shadow of Soviet offensive, death of Prime Minister Sikorski ===
As the Soviet forces began their westward offensive with the victory at Stalingrad, it had become increasingly apparent that Stalin's vision of a future Poland and of its borders was fundamentally different from that of the Polish government in London and the Polish Underground State; the Polish-Soviet relations kept deteriorating. Polish communist institutions rival to those of the main national independence and pro-Western movement were established in Poland in January 1942 (the Polish Workers' Party) and in the Soviet Union (the Union of Polish Patriots). Early in 1943, the Polish communists (their delegation led by Władysław Gomułka) engaged in Warsaw in negotiations with the Delegation of the Government-in-Exile, but no common understanding was arrived at and the Delegation terminated the talks after the Soviet-Polish breach in diplomatic relations caused by the dispute concerning the Katyn massacre. The Polish Workers' Party formulated its separate program and from November was officially under Gomułka's leadership. On the initiative of the Union of Polish Patriots, presided by Wanda Wasilewska, in the spring of 1943 the Soviets began recruiting for a leftist Polish army led by Zygmunt Berling, a Polish Army colonel, to replace the "treacherous" Anders' army that left. The Kościuszko Division was rushed to its first military engagement and fought at the Battle of Lenino on 12–13 October. The Soviet-based communist faction, organized around the Central Bureau Communists of Poland (activated January 1944), directed by such future Stalinist Poland's ruling personalities as Jakub Berman, Hilary Minc, and Roman Zambrowski, was increasingly influential. They also had a prevailing sway on the formation of Berling's First Polish Army in 1943–44.

In April 1943, the Germans discovered the graves of 4,000 or more Polish officers at Katyn near Smolensk. The Polish government, suspecting the Soviets to be the perpetrators of an atrocity, requested the Red Cross to investigate. The Soviets denied involvement and the request was soon withdrawn by Sikorski under British and American pressure, but Stalin reacted by "suspending" diplomatic relations with the Polish Government-in-Exile on 25 April. The Katyn massacre information was suppressed during and after the war by the British, to whom the revelation was an embarrassment and presented a political difficulty.

Prime Minister Sikorski, the most prominent of the Polish exile leaders, was killed in an air crash near Gibraltar on 4 July 1943. Sikorski was succeeded as head of the Government-in-Exile by Stanisław Mikołajczyk and by Kazimierz Sosnkowski as the top military chief. Sikorski had been willing to work closely with Churchill, including on the issue of cooperation with the Soviets. The prime minister believed that Poland's strategic and economic weaknesses would be eliminated by a takeover of German East Prussia, Pomerania and Silesia and that Polish territorial concessions in the east were feasible. On the other hand, Sikorski was credited with preventing the Soviet territorial demands from being granted in the Anglo-Soviet Treaty of 1942. After his death, the Polish government's position within the Allied coalition deteriorated further and the body splintered into quarreling factions.

=== Decline of Government-in-Exile ===
At the Moscow Conference of foreign ministers of the three Allied great powers (October 1943), at the request of the Polish government borders were not discussed, but US President Franklin D. Roosevelt had already expressed his support for Britain's approval of the Curzon Line as the future Polish-Soviet boundary. The powers represented divided Europe into spheres of influence and Poland was placed within the Soviet sphere. The Poles were also disappointed by a lack of progress regarding the resumption of Polish-Soviet diplomatic ties, an urgent issue, because the Soviet armies were moving toward Poland's 1939 frontiers.

In November–December 1943, the Tehran Conference of the Allied leaders took place. President Roosevelt and Prime Minister Churchill agreed with Stalin on the issue of using the Curzon Line as the basis of Poland's new eastern border and on compensating Poland with lands taken from Germany. The strategic war alliance with the Soviets inevitably outweighed the Western loyalty toward the Polish government and people. The Poles were not consulted or properly informed of the three Allied leaders' decisions.

With the Western Allies stalling a serious offensive undertaking from the west,^{[j]} it was clear that it would be the Soviet Union who would enter Poland and drive off Nazi Germans. The Soviet offensive aimed at taking the Vistula basin commenced in January 1944. Churchill applied pressure to Prime Minister Mikołajczyk, demanding accommodation with the Soviets, including on the issue of the borders. As the Red Army was marching into Poland defeating the Nazis, Stalin toughened his stance against the Polish Government-in-Exile, wanting not only the recognition of the proposed frontiers, but also a resignation from the government of all elements 'hostile to the Soviet Union', which meant President Raczkiewicz, armed forces commander Sosnkowski, and other ministers.

The Underground State governing structures were formed by the Peasant Alliance, the Socialist Party, the National Alliance and the Labour Alliance. They acted as rivals in a fragile coalition, each defining its own identity and posturing for the expected post-war contest for power. The Polish government in London was losing its already weak influence on the views of the British and American governments.

The British and Soviet demands on the exile government were made in January 1944, in the context of a possible renewal of Polish-Soviet diplomatic relations and, contingent on the Polish agreement, a Soviet consent for an independent, presumably "Finlandized" Polish state. Following a refusal to accept the conditions by the Polish government, the Soviets engaged in supporting only the leftist government structures they were in process of facilitating, allowing contacts with Mikołajczyk, but already within the framework of communist control.^{[q]}

In the aftermath of the controversial visit of Oskar R. Lange to the Soviet Union, the Polish American Congress was established in the US in May 1944; among the organization's goals was the promotion of interests of independent Poland before the US Government. Mikołajczyk visited the US in June and on several occasions met with President Roosevelt, who urged him to travel to Moscow and talk to the Soviet leaders directly. Mikołajczyk, subsequently engaged in negotiations with Stalin and the emerging Polish communist government (PKWN), eventually resigned his post and Tomasz Arciszewski became the new prime minister in exile in November 1944. Mikołajczyk's disagreements with his coalition partners (he was unable to convince the ministers that restoration of the prewar eastern border of Poland was no longer feasible and further compromises were necessary) and his departure created a vacuum, because the British and the Americans were practically unwilling to deal with the Polish government that followed.^{[o]}

In 1944, the Polish forces in the West were making a substantial contribution to the war. In May, participating in the Italian Campaign, the Second Corps under General Anders stormed the fortress of Monte Cassino and opened a road to Rome. In the summer and fall, the corps participated in the Battle of Ancona and the Gothic Line offensive, finishing the campaign with the Battle of Bologna in April 1945. In August 1944, after the Normandy landings, General Stanisław Maczek's 1st Armoured Division distinguished itself at the Battle of Falaise. After fighting the Battle of Chambois and defending Hill 262, the division crossed into Belgium, where it took Ypres. In October, heavy fighting by its units helped secure Antwerp and resulted in the taking of the Dutch city of Breda. In April 1945 the division concluded its combat in Germany, where it occupied Wilhelmshaven and liberated a war prisoner camp that held many Polish female POWs, captured by the Nazis after the Warsaw Uprising. In September General Stanisław Sosabowski's Parachute Brigade fought hard at the Battle of Arnhem. The Polish Air Force, comprising 15 warplane squadrons and 10,000 pilots, fully participated in the Western offensive, as did the Polish Navy ships.

=== Soviet and Polish-communist victory ===
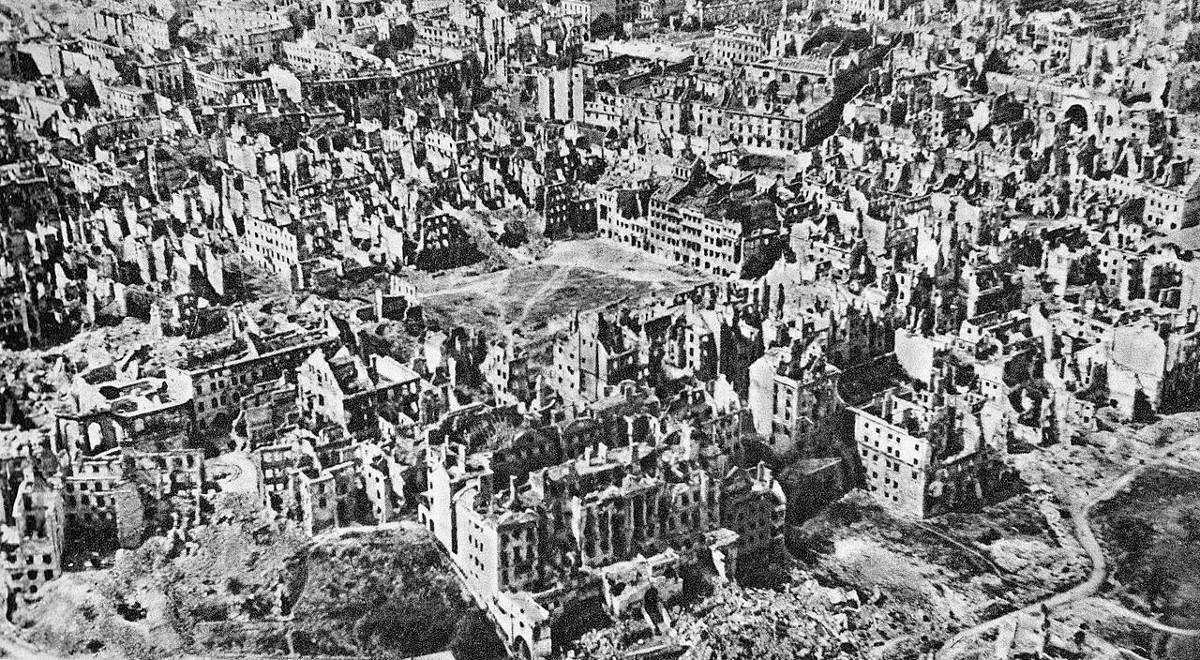
January 1945 aerial photo of destroyed Warsaw

The Bug River was crossed by the Soviets (1st Belorussian Front) on 19 July 1944 and their commander Konstantin Rokossovsky headed for Warsaw, together with the allied Polish forces. As they approached the Polish capital, German panzer divisions counterattacked, while the Poles commenced the Warsaw Uprising. After the German attack was brought under control, Rokossovsky informed Stalin on 8 August that his forces would be ready to engage in an offensive against the Germans in Warsaw around 25 August, but received no reply. The Soviets secured their Vistula bridgeheads, and, with the First Polish Army, established control over the Praga east-bank districts of Warsaw.^{[z]} The situation on the ground, combined with political and strategic considerations, resulted in the Soviet decision to pause at the Vistula for the remainder of 1944.

The Government-in-Exile in London was determined that the Home Army would cooperate with the advancing Red Army on a tactical level, as Polish civil authorities from the Underground State took power in Allied-controlled Polish territory, to ensure that Poland remained an independent country after the war. However, the failure of Operation Tempest and the Warsaw Uprising laid the country open to the establishment of communist rule and Soviet domination. The Soviets performed arrests, executions and deportations of the Home Army and Underground State members, although AK partisans were generally encouraged to join the communist-led Polish armies.

In January 1945, Soviet and allied Polish armies undertook a massive offensive, aiming at the liberation of Poland and the defeat of Nazi Germany. Marshal Ivan Konev's 1st Ukrainian Front broke out of its Sandomierz Vistula bridgehead on 11 January and rapidly moved west, taking Radom, Częstochowa and Kielce on 16 January. Kraków was liberated on 18 January, a day after Hans Frank and the German administration fled the city. Marshal Konev's forces then advanced toward Upper Silesia, freeing the remaining survivors of the Auschwitz concentration camp on 27 January. In early February, the 1st Ukrainian Front reached the Oder River in the vicinity of Breslau.

North of the Ukrainian Front, the 1st Belorussian Front under Marshal Georgy Zhukov went to the Oder along the Łódź and Poznań route. Still further north operated the 2nd Belorussian Front commanded by Marshal Konstantin Rokossovsky. The First Polish Army fought on the 1st and 2nd Belorussian Fronts. It entered the rubble of Warsaw on 17 January, formally liberating the city. Poznań was taken by Soviet formations after a bloody battle. In the context of the westbound offensive but also to support the clearing of East Prussia and the forces engaged in the Battle of Königsberg, the First Polish Army was directed northwards to the Pomeranian region, where its drive began at the end of January.

The heaviest battles fought by the Poles included the breaching of the Pomeranian Wall, accomplished by the badly battered First Polish Army and the Soviets on 5 February, during their East Pomeranian Offensive. The Poles, commanded by General Stanisław Popławski, then led the assault on Kolberg, completed on 18 March. Gdynia and Danzig were taken over by the 2nd Belorussian Front by the end of March, with the participation of the Polish 1st Armoured Brigade. The First Polish Army's campaign continued as it forced the Oder in April and finally reached the Elbe River in early May.

The Second Polish Army was led by Karol Świerczewski and operated with the 1st Ukrainian Front. The soldiers, who were recently conscripted, poorly taken care of and badly commanded, advanced toward Dresden from 16 April and suffered huge losses as they struggled in the Battle of Bautzen. Subsequently, the Second Army took part in the capture of Dresden and then crossed into Czechoslovakia to fight in the final Prague Offensive, entering the city on 11 May.

The Polish Army, placed under the overall command of Michał Rola-Żymierski, was ultimately expanded to 400,000 people, and, helping to defeat Germany all the way to the Battle of Berlin (elements of the First Polish Army), suffered losses equal to those experienced during the 1939 defense of the country (according to Czubiński). Over 600,000 Soviet soldiers died fighting German troops in Poland. Terrified by the reports of Soviet-committed atrocities, masses of Germans fled in the westerly direction.

According to Czubiński, in the final stages of the war, the Polish armed forces were the fourth largest on the Allied side, after the armies of the Soviet Union, the United States, and the United Kingdom.

== Polish state reestablished with new borders and under Soviet domination ==
=== Poland's war losses ===
The numerical dimensions of Polish World War II human losses are difficult to ascertain. According to the official data of the Polish War Reparations Bureau (1946), 644,000 Polish citizens died as a result of military action and 5.1 million died as a result of the occupiers' repressions and extermination policies. According to Czubiński, the Soviet Union was responsible for the deaths of some 50,000 of the exterminated persons.

Approximately 90% of Polish Jews perished; most of those who survived did so by fleeing to the Soviet Union. 380,000 Polish Jews were estimated to have survived the war. According to an estimate of the Central Committee of Polish Jews, 50,000 Jews survived in Poland. Close to 300,000 Jews found themselves in Poland soon after the war. For a number of reasons, including antisemitic activities such as the Kielce pogrom of 1946, Żydokomuna accusations, loss of families, communities and property, desire to emigrate to Palestine or to places in the West deemed more advantageous than post-war Poland, most of the surviving Jews left Poland in several stages after the war. The goal of Polish communist authorities was a state populated by ethnic Poles and the officials often informally facilitated departures of the Jews.

The heaviest losses among ethnic Poles were experienced by people with secondary and higher education, who were targeted by the occupiers and of whom a third or more had not survived. Academics and professional people suffered the most. According to Kochanski, only about 10% of the human losses of Poland were a result of military action; the rest came from intentional exterminations, persecutions, war and occupation hardships and the attendant attrition. 800,000 Poles became permanently disabled and large numbers failed to return from abroad, which further reduced the manpower potential of Poland. 105,000 service people, or about one-half of the soldiers enlisted in the Polish Armed Forces in the West, returned to Poland after the war.^{[x]}

The war destroyed 38% of Poland's national assets. A substantial majority of Polish industrial installations and agricultural infrastructure had been lost. Warsaw and a number of other cities were for the most part destroyed and required extensive rebuilding.

Biological losses of Polish society as reported by Polish government in January 1947 "Report on the losses and damages of war in Poland in 1939–1945"
Specification	Number of persons in thousands	%
1. Loss of life — total; a) due to direct military action b) due to the occupiers' terror	6.028 644; 5.384	100.0 10.7; 89.3
2. War invalidity (war invalids and civilian invalids — total); a) physical handicap b) mental handicap	590 530; 60	100.0 89.8; 10.2
3. Excess of tuberculosis instances (exceeding the average theoretical number of instances)	1.140	100.0

=== Beginnings of communist government ===
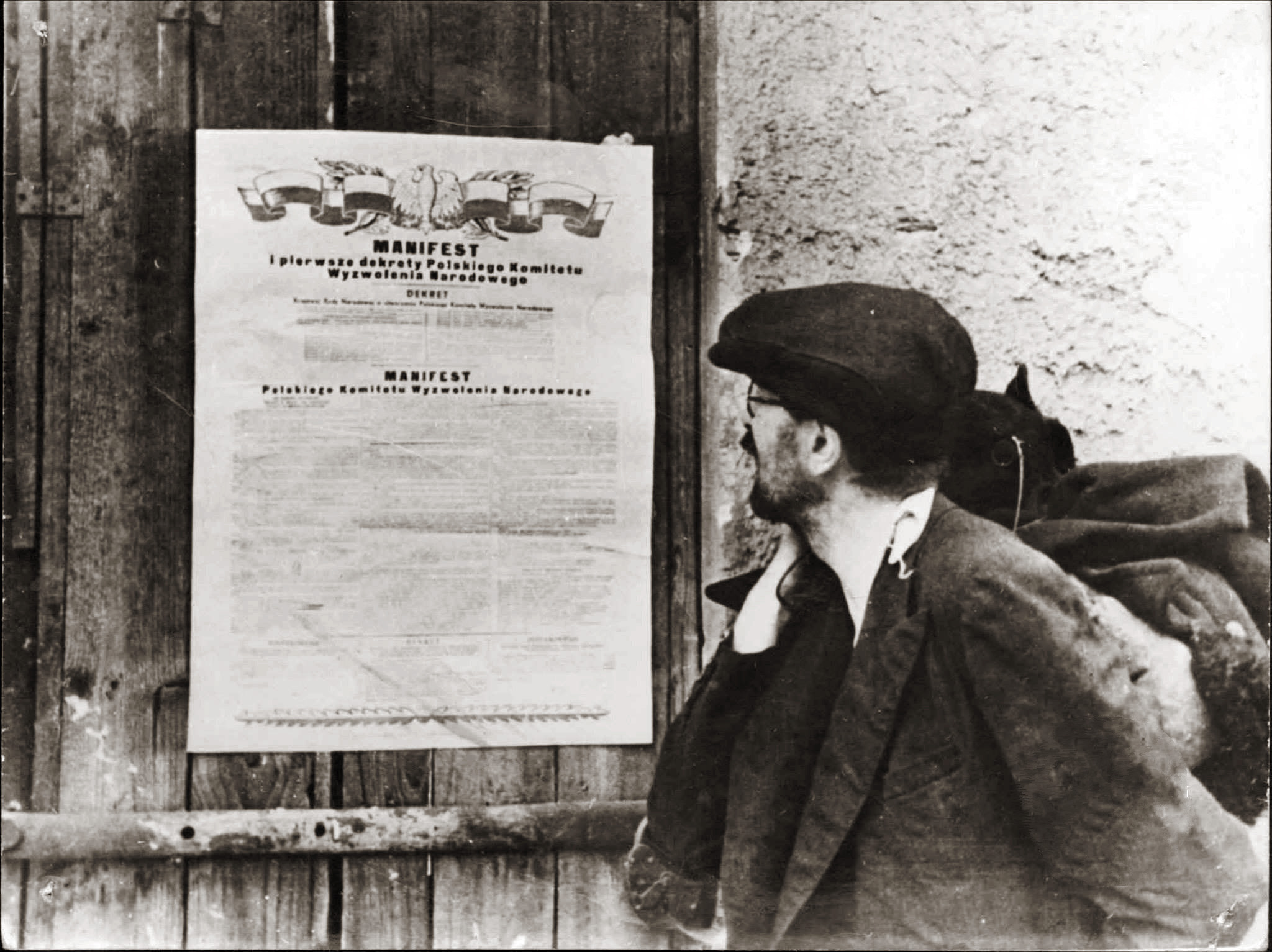
The PKWN Manifesto was issued on 22 July 1944

The State National Council (KRN), chaired by Bolesław Bierut, was established in Warsaw by the Polish Workers' Party (PPR) on January 1, 1944. The Armia Ludowa was its army. The Polish communist centers in Warsaw and in Moscow initially operated separately and had different visions of cooperation with the Soviet Union and regarding other issues. In the spring of 1944, the KRN sent a delegation to the Soviet Union, where it gained Stalin's recognition and the two branches began working together. In intense negotiations, the two Polish communist groups agreed to establish the Polish Committee of National Liberation (PKWN), a sort of temporary government.

As the Soviets advanced through Poland in 1944 and 1945, the German administration collapsed. The communist-controlled PKWN was installed in July 1944 in Lublin, the first major Polish city within the new boundaries to be seized by the Soviets from the Nazis, and began to take over the administration of the country as the Germans retreated. The Polish government in London formally protested the establishment of the PKWN. The PKWN was led by Edward Osóbka-Morawski, a socialist, and included other non-communists. The PKWN Manifesto was proclaimed in Chełm on July 22, initiating the crucial land reform. The agrarian reform, according to Norman Davies, was moderate and very popular.^{[b]} The communists constituted only a small, but highly organized and influential minority in the forming and gaining strength Polish pro-Soviet camp, which also included leaders and factions from such main political blocks as the agrarian, socialist, Zionist, and nationalist movements. The Polish Left in particular, with considerable support from the peasant movement leaders, both critical in respect to the Second Republic's record, was inclined to accept the Soviet territorial concepts and called for the creation of a more egalitarian society. They became empowered and commenced the formation of the new Polish administration, disregarding the existing Underground State structures.

The so-called Provisional Government of the Republic of Poland was established at the end of 1944 in Lublin and was recognized by the Soviet Union, Czechoslovakia and Yugoslavia. It was headed by the socialist Osóbka-Morawski, but the communists held a majority of key posts. In April 1945, the provisional government signed a mutual friendship, alliance and cooperation pact with the Soviet Union.

In late 1944 and early 1945, the Poles on the one hand tended to resent the Soviet Union and communism and feared Poland's becoming a Soviet dependency, while on the other the leftist viewpoints were increasingly popular among the population. There was little support for a continuation of the prewar policies.

=== Allied determinations ===
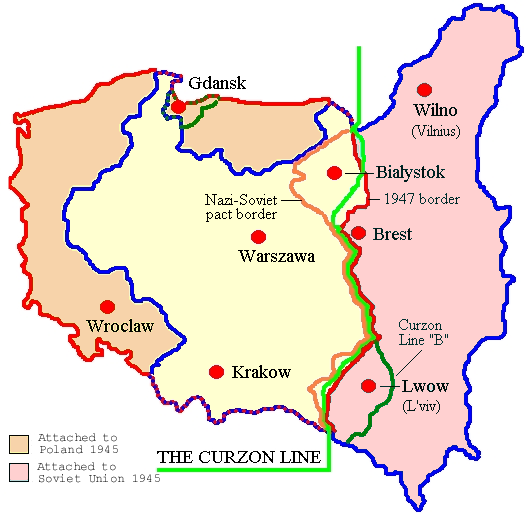
The legacy of World War II: Poland's old and new borders

By the time of the Yalta Conference, in February 1945, the Soviets were at the height of their power, while the fronts in Western Europe and Italy had not advanced as quickly as expected. At the conference, the Allies continued their discussions and informally finalized decisions on the postwar order in Europe. Churchill and Roosevelt accepted the Curzon Line as the basis of Poland's eastern border, but disagreed with Stalin on the extent of Poland's western expansion, at the expense of Germany.^{[n]} Poland was going to get a compromise provisional (until the agreed free elections) government of national unity including both the existing communist government, now unofficially considered principal, and pro-Western forces. There was a disagreement regarding the issue of inclusion of the London-based government in exile as the main pro-Western faction in the government of national unity. The Polish government in exile reacted to the Yalta announcements (unlike the Tehran Conference outcomes, Yalta results were made public) with a series of fervent protests. The Underground State in Poland, through its Council of National Unity that operated in hiding, issued a more measured and pragmatic response, regretting the sacrifices imposed on Poland but expecting a representative government established and committing itself to adapt to the situation and to promote "friendly and peaceful relations" with the Soviet Union. The council declared its readiness to participate in the consultations leading to the formation of the government of national unity.

The tripartite Allied commission made up of Vyacheslav Molotov and the British and American ambassadors in Moscow worked on the composition of the Polish government of national unity from 23 February, but the negotiations soon stalled because of different interpretations of the Yalta Conference agreements. The former prime minister in exile Stanisław Mikołajczyk, approached by representatives of the communist-controlled Provisional Government, refused to make a separate deal with that body, but on 15 April made a statement of acceptance of the Yalta decisions.

Because of the continuing disagreement on the composition of the government of national unity, Churchill convinced Mikołajczyk to take part in a conference in Moscow in June 1945, where he and other Polish democrats agreed with Stalin to a temporary deal (until the elections promised to take place soon, but with no specific time frame provided or even discussed) excluding the government in exile. Mikołajczyk was perceived in the West as the only reasonable Polish politician.

Based on the understanding reached in Moscow by the three powers with Mikołajczyk's help, the Government of National Unity was constituted on 28 June 1945, with Osóbka-Morawski as prime minister, and Władysław Gomułka and Mikołajczyk as deputy prime ministers. Mikołajczyk returned to Poland with Stanisław Grabski in July and was enthusiastically greeted by large crowds in several Polish cities. The new government was quickly recognized by the United Kingdom, the United States, and most other countries. The government, formally a coalition, was in reality controlled entirely by Gomułka's Polish Workers' Party and other Polish politicians convinced of the inevitability of Soviet domination. The government was charged with conducting elections and normalizing the situation in Poland. The exile government in London, no longer recognized by the great powers, remained in existence until 1991.

=== Persecution of opposition ===
Persecution of the opposition intensified in October 1944, when the PKWN authorities encountered widespread loyalty problems among the now conscripted military personnel and other sections of Polish society. The enforcement of the communist rule was undertaken by the NKVD and the Polish security services, all backed by the massive presence of the Red Army in Poland. Potential political opponents of the communists were subjected to Soviet terror campaigns, with many of them arrested, executed or tortured. According to one estimate, 25,000 people lost their lives in labour camps created by the Soviets as early as 1944.

A conspiratorial AK-related organization known as NIE (for Niepodległość or Independence) was set up in 1944 by Emil Fieldorf. General Okulicki became its commander and NIE remained in existence after the AK was dissolved in January 1945. Its activities were directed against the communist Provisional Government. However, as a result of Okulicki's arrest by the NKVD in March and the persecution, NIE ceased to exist. The Armed Forces Delegation for Poland was established instead in May, to be finally replaced by the Freedom and Independence (WiN) formation, whose goal was to organize political rather than military resistance to the communist domination.

Government Delegate Jan Stanisław Jankowski, chairman of the Council of National Unity Kazimierz Pużak and thirteen other Polish Underground State leaders were invited to and on 27 March 1945 attended talks with General Ivan Serov of the NKVD. They were all arrested and taken to Moscow to await a trial. The Polish communist Provisional Government and the Western leaders were not informed by the Soviets of the arrests. The British and the Americans were notified by the Polish Government-in-Exile. After the belated Soviet admission, they unsuccessfully pressured the Soviet government for the release of the captives. In June 1945, the Trial of the Sixteen was staged in Moscow. They were accused of anti-Soviet subversion and received lenient by Soviet standards sentences, presumably because of the ongoing negotiations on the formation of Polish government and Western interventions. Okulicki was condemned to ten years in prison.

Post-German industrial and other property was looted by the Soviets as war reparations, even though the former lands of eastern Germany were coming under permanent Polish administration.^{[v]} As the Soviets and the pro-Soviet Poles solidified their control of the country, a political struggle with the suppressed and harassed opposition ensued, accompanied by a residual but brutally fought armed rebellion waged by unreconciled elements of the former, now officially disbanded underground and the nationalistic right wing. Thousands of militiamen, PPR members and others were murdered before the communist authorities brought the situation under control.^{[r]} According to one estimate, in the post-war violence about 10,000 members of the anti-communist underground were killed, along with 4,500 regime functionaries and several hundred Soviet soldiers.

A "Democratic Bloc" comprising the communists and their socialist, rural and urban allies was established. Mikołajczyk's Polish People's Party (PSL), which refused to join the bloc, was the only legal opposition; they counted on winning the promised legislative elections. Other contemporary Polish movements, including the National Democracy, Sanation, and Christian Democracy were not allowed to function legally and were dealt with by the Polish and Soviet internal security organs.

The Western Allies and their leaders, Roosevelt and Churchill in particular, have been criticised by Polish writers and some Western historians for what most Poles see as the abandonment of Poland to Soviet rule. Decisions were made at the Tehran, Yalta and Potsdam conferences and on other occasions that amounted, according to such opinions, to Western complicity in Stalin's takeover of Eastern Europe.^{[a]} According to Czubiński, blaming the Western powers, especially Winston Churchill, for a "betrayal" of the Polish ally, "seems a complete misunderstanding".

=== Soviet-controlled Polish state ===
Postwar Poland was a state of reduced sovereignty, strongly dependent on the Soviet Union, but the only one possible under the existing circumstances and internationally recognized. The Polish Left's cooperation with the Stalin's regime made the preservation of a Polish state within favorable borders possible. The dominant Polish Workers' Party had a strictly pro-Soviet branch, led by Bierut and a number of internationalist in outlook Jewish communist activists, and a national branch, willing to take a "Polish route to socialism", led by Gomułka.

As agreed by the Allies in Yalta, the Soviet Union incorporated the lands in eastern Poland (Kresy, east of the Curzon Line), previously occupied and annexed in 1939 (see Territories of Poland annexed by the Soviet Union). Deferring to Stalin's territorial schemes,^{[t]} the Allies compensated Poland with the German territories east of the Oder–Neisse line, parts of Pomerania, Silesia and East Prussia (in Polish communist government's propaganda referred to as the Recovered Territories).^{[m]} The deal was practically, but in principle not permanently, finalized at the Potsdam Conference (17 July to 2 August 1945).^{[u]} The entire country was shifted to the west and resembled the territory of Medieval early Piast Poland. Per the Potsdam agreement, millions of Germans were expelled and forced to relocate their families to the new Germany. About 4.4 million had already fled not waiting for the Potsdam decrees (most during the final months of the war), and 3.5 million were removed from what was now territory of Poland in 1945–1949. Davies wrote that the resettlement of Germans was not merely an act of wartime revenge, but a result of decades old Allied policy. The Russians as well as the British saw the German East Prussia as a product of German militarism, the "root of Europe's miseries", and the Allies therefore intended to eradicate it.

The new western and northern territories of Poland were repopulated with Poles "repatriated" from the eastern regions now in the Soviet Union (2–3 million people) and from other places.^{[w]} The precise Soviet-Polish border was delineated in the Polish–Soviet border agreement of 16 August 1945. The new Poland emerged 20% smaller (by 77,700 km^{2} or 29,900 mi^{2}) in comparison to the 1939 borders. Eastern poorly developed regions were lost and western industrialized regions were gained, but the emotional impact for many Poles was clearly negative. The population transfers included also the moving of the Ukrainians and the Belarusians from Poland into their respective Soviet republics. In particular, the Soviet and Polish communist authorities expelled between 1944 and 1947 nearly 700,000 Ukrainians and Lemkos, transferring most of them into Soviet Ukraine, and then spreading the remaining groups in the Polish Recovered Territories during the Operation Vistula, thus ensuring that postwar Poland would not have significant minorities or any minority concentrations to contend with. Thousands were killed in the attendant strife and violence. After the war, many displaced Poles and some of those living in Kresy, now in the Soviet Union, did not end up in Poland as reestablished in 1945. The population within the respective official Polish borders decreased from 35.1 million in 1939 to 23.7 million in 1946.

Poland's western borders were soon questioned by the Germans and many in the West, while the planned peace conference had not materialized because the Cold War replaced the wartime cooperation. The borders, essential to Poland's existence, were in practice guaranteed by the Soviet Union, which only increased the dependence of Polish government leaders on their Soviet counterparts.

== See also ==
- History of Poland (1945–1989)
- List of Polish cities damaged in World War II
- Polish culture during World War II
- Polish material losses during World War II
- World War II casualties of Poland
- Charles Thau

== Notes ==
a. According to Davies, the Grand Alliance (Britain, USA and the Soviet Union) decided in the meetings of its three leaders that the unconditional defeat of the Reich was the Alliance's overriding priority (principal war aim). Once this definition was accepted, the two Western powers, having obliged themselves not to withdraw from the conflict for any reason (including pressuring the Soviets), had lost their ability to meaningfully influence Soviet actions.

b. The PKWN's land reform decree was issued on 6 September 1944. The Polish communists were reluctant to execute the land reform, which represented a radical departure from old Polish legal systems (they claimed adherence to the 1921 March Constitution of Poland). Polish peasants were reluctant to take over the landowners' possessions. Stalin summoned to Moscow in late September the KRN and PKWN leaders, led by Bierut, and inquired about the progress of the land reform. The Soviet leader asked how many estates had already been parceled and was very unhappy to find out that the answer was zero. He repeatedly lectured the Polish leaders, appealing to their communist convictions and patriotism. Stalin urged them to start implementing the land reform without any further delay, not to worry excessively about legal proprieties, because it was a revolutionary action, and to take advantage of the fact that the Red Army was still in Poland to help.

c. Marshal Rydz-Śmigły made a final radio broadcast to Polish troops from Romania on September 20. He stressed the Polish army's involvement in fighting the Germans and told the commanders to avoid pointless bloodshed of fighting the Bolsheviks.

d. All Polish institutions of secondary and higher education were dismantled and remained closed throughout the war. Some managed to continue functioning as an underground activity.

e. According to Kochanski, 694,000 Polish soldiers, including 60,000 Jews, were captured by the Germans, and 240,000 by the Soviets.

f. Kochanski contradicts Czubiński, stating that the exile government did consider itself at war with the Soviet Union. Sikorski's position was that Germany was the principal enemy and that cooperation with the Soviet Union was conditionally possible. There were rival factions in the government and probably no official proclamations on that issue.

g. The British wanted the Polish forces moved to the Middle East because they expected a German offensive in that direction, through the Caucasus. Churchill asked Stalin to permit the Poles to leave the Soviet Union and thanked him when the agreement was secured. Sikorski was opposed to the removal of Polish soldiers from the Soviet Union, but eventually relented. Sikorski wanted Polish armies engaged against Germany in Western Europe, in the Middle East and in the Soviet Union, because of the uncertain outcomes of military campaigns and because of the need for a Polish (Government-in-Exile affiliated) military force fighting along whichever power would eventually liberate Poland. General Anders, earlier characterized in Soviet internal documents as a loyal pro-Soviet Polish officer (he was a strong supporter of the Sikorski–Mayski agreement of July 1941), by the spring of 1942 became convinced of the inevitability of Soviet defeat. Anders then insisted on taking the Polish formations out of the Soviet Union and opposed Sikorski. Eventually Anders became known for his anti-Soviet views; he demanded a dismissal of the government led by Sikorski, his commander-in-chief. At the time of the decision to remove the Polish army from the Soviet Union, it was not yet apparent that the war with Germany would be resolved mainly by a victorious Soviet westbound offensive on the Eastern Front and that the other war theaters would be relegated to a more peripheral role. In particular, it was not known that Poland would be liberated by the Soviets.

h. According to Czubiński, 32,000 Polish soldiers were evacuated, including 6,200 pilots.

i. According to Kochanski, a million and a quarter labor prisoners were forcibly taken by the Nazis from the General Government alone. According to Sowa, over 2.5 million Polish citizens were used as forced laborers in Germany and occupied France.

j. After the abortive Dieppe Raid in Normandy in 1942, the Allies exercised extra caution and would not risk any more failed operations. In general, the Americans demanded accelerated offensive action in Europe, while the British wanted to delay the landing in France, which they judged impractical for the time being, and focus instead on the much easier to execute Italian Campaign.

k. Expecting the arrival of the Red Army, in December 1944 the Nazis at the last moment closed down the Auschwitz slave labor operation, demolished the main compound and force-marched some 60,000 prisoners toward camps in Germany. A smaller number of sick people remained on the premises until the Soviets arrived.

l. The Western powers were soon informed of the secret provisions to the treaty, but failed to notify the Polish government.

m. The lands expected to be taken from Germany were also considered a restored Polish territory by the Polish Underground State leaders.

n. The Polish communists attempted to obtain modifications of the Curzon Line that would result in Poland retaining Vilnius, Lviv and the oil fields of Eastern Galicia. Similar territorial conditions were postulated by the Polish government in London in August 1944, after Prime Minister Mikołajczyk's visit to Moscow. Joseph Stalin decided to satisfy the Lithuanian demands for Vilnius, Ukrainian for Lviv, and to annex for the Soviet Union Eastern Galicia, a region that had never been a part of the Russian Empire.

o. The Polish Government-in-Exile had to cope with a number of instances of negative media and other publicity. In one particularly damaging case, about one third of the Jewish soldiers in the Polish Army in Britain deserted, claiming antisemitism in the institution. Some of them joined a British corps and some were court-martialed, but eventually granted amnesty by President Raczkiewicz.

p. During the 1930s, the relations between the ruling Sanation camp and the various opposition groups and parties were tense, often hostile. From 1938, the growing external threat was clearly perceived by many and there were voices (mainly from the opposition) calling for the formation of a unified Government of National Defense and for taking other steps to promote a defense-minded consolidation of society. The Sanation ruling circle was not inclined to broaden the government's base and in June 1939 ultimately rejected any power-sharing ideas, apparently because they did not believe in the seriousness of German hostile intentions. The delegations that paid visits to President Mościcki and presented petitions on the issue of coalition government and general war preparedness, representing the agrarian and socialist parties and Polish intellectuals, were not well received. The regime did appeal to citizens' patriotism and generosity and several major fund raising efforts, often led by opposition groups and politicians (some of whom returned at that time of danger from political exile), resulted in donations of considerable magnitude, which by and large ended up not utilized.

q. In late February 1945, referring to the post-Yalta Conference protests of the Polish Government-in-Exile, Winston Churchill said the following in the House of Commons: "Let me remind them that there would have been no Lublin Committee or Lublin Provisional Government in Poland if the Polish Government in London had accepted our faithful counsel given to them a year ago. They would have entered into Poland as its active Government, with the liberating Armies of Russia."

r. The right-wing anti-communist National Armed Forces (NSZ) stopped cooperating with the AK in November 1944. Being highly antisemitic, they attacked Jewish partisans in German-occupied Poland. They fought the incoming Soviet troops and Polish security forces. The Holy Cross Mountains Brigade of the NSZ avoided the Soviet advance and collaborated with the German military authorities, which made possible its entry into Czechoslovakia in February 1945. As the war ended, the brigade came in contact with the US 3rd Army. The British refused to agree to the brigade's incorporation into the Polish Armed Forces in the West and the brigade was disarmed by the US Army in August.

s. According to Andrzej Leon Sowa, between 10,000 and 25,000 civilians and 5,000 Polish soldiers perished during the siege and defense of Warsaw.

t. The size of post-war Poland was determined by Joseph Stalin alone, because the Western Allies, as shown by the record of British diplomacy, would not have objected to a much smaller Polish state being established.

u. The communist Provisional Government of Poland demanded the establishment of the post-war Polish-German border at the Oder–Neisse line, that is along the Lusatian Neisse (Western Neisse), and, further north, the Oder river. Joseph Stalin indicated his support for the Polish position and the Provisional Government administered the region as soon as it was cleared of the German forces. The American and especially the British governments had a long-standing preference for the border to run further east in its southern portion, along the Nysa Kłodzka (Eastern Neisse) and the upper Oder rivers, which would keep a large portion of Lower Silesia and of the city of Breslau in post-war Germany. At the Potsdam Conference, the delegation of what was now the Polish Provisional Government of National Unity continued lobbying aimed at keeping all of Lower Silesia under Polish jurisdiction, rather than letting some of it be a part of the Soviet occupation zone of Germany. Taking advantage of the British delegation's disruption by the results of the British election, the Americans engaged in dealing with the Soviets on their own. Its outcome, stated in the conference protocols, was that until the final peace settlement, the area all the way west to the Lusatian Neisse would by administered by Poland and not be a part of the Soviet zone of occupation. The planned peace conference never took place and the border has remained where it was provisionally placed in 1945. It was confirmed in the treaties that Poland signed with West Germany in 1970 and with unified Germany in 1990.

v. The confiscations stopped after repeated appeals to Vyacheslav Molotov by Jakub Berman and Hilary Minc.

w. There was a total of 1,517,983 'repatriates' from the east, according to Halik Kochanski. Others give different figures. Of the several million ethnic Poles living in Kresy, a few million were repatriated to Poland as reestablished within new borders, while perhaps a million stayed in what had become the Soviet territory.

x. Most of the soldiers who opted to stay in the West hailed from the eastern Kresy areas annexed to the Soviet Union. The bulk of Anders' Army fell in that category.

y. Several thousand Poles fought in the Soviet partisans units. A smaller number of Jews also served there and in the Polish communist Gwardia Ludowa. Jews were rarely admitted into the Polish mainstream and nationalist underground armed organizations.

z. The liberation of the Praga right-bank part of Warsaw took over a month of fighting at the cost of eight thousand soldiers killed on each side. After the area was cleared of the Germans in mid-September, General Zygmunt Berling's forces crossed the Vistula and the failed Czerniaków operation (a limited Warsaw Uprising rescue attempt) began.

== Bibliography ==
- Work, Group (1947). "Sprawozdanie w przedmiocie strat i szkód wojennych Polski w latach 1939-1945" (eng. "Report on the losses and damages of war in Poland in 1939-1945") DJVU file (in Polish). Warszawa: Biuro Odszkodowań Wojennych.
- Chodakiewicz, Marek Jan. Between Nazis and Soviets: Occupation Politics in Poland, 1939–1947. Lanham: Lexington Books, 2004 ISBN 0-7391-0484-5. online review
- Coutouvidis, John, and Reynolds, Jaime. Poland, 1939–1947 (1986)
- Davies, Norman (1982), God's Playground. New York: Columbia University Press. ISBN 0-231-05353-3 and ISBN 0-231-05351-7.
- Davies, Norman Rising '44: The Battle for Warsaw (2004)
- Douglas, R.M. Orderly and Humane. The Expulsion of the Germans after the Second World War. Yale University Press, 2012. ISBN 978-0-300-16660-6.
- Fritz, Stephen G. (2011). Ostkrieg: Hitler's War of Extermination in the East. University Press of Kentucky. ISBN 978-0813140506.
- Gross, Jan Tomasz, Revolution from Abroad: The Soviet Conquest of Poland's Western Ukraine and Western Belorussia, Princeton University Press, 2002, ISBN 0-691-09603-1.
- Gross, Jan T. Polish Society under German Occupation: The Generalgouvernement, 1939–1944 (Princeton UP, 1979)
- Hiden, John. ed. The Baltic and the Outbreak of the Second World War, Cambridge University Press, 2003, ISBN 0-521-53120-9
- Kochanski, Halik. The Eagle Unbowed: Poland and the Poles in the Second World War. Harvard U.P., 2012, ISBN 0674071050, with word search by Amazon.
- Koskodan, Kenneth K. No Greater Ally: The Untold Story of Poland's Forces in World War II, Osprey Publishing 2009, ISBN 978-1-84908-479-6.
- Lukas, Richard C. Did the Children Cry: Hitler's War Against Jewish and Polish Children, 1939–1945 (1st ed.; N.Y.:Hippocrene, 1994). ISBN 0-7818-0242-3
- Lukas, Richard C. Forgotten Holocaust:The Poles under German Occupation, 1939–1944 (3rd rev. ed.; N.Y.:Hippocrene, 2012). ISBN 978-0-7818-1302-0
- Lukas, Richard C. Forgotten Survivors:Polish Christians Remember the Nazi Occupation (1st ed.; Lawrence, KS: University Press of Kansas, 2004). ISBN 0-7818-0242-3
- Sword, Keith (1991). The Soviet Takeover of the Polish Eastern Provinces, 1939–41. Palgrave Macmillan. ISBN 0-312-05570-6.
- Snyder, Timothy. Bloodlands: Europe Between Hitler and Stalin (2010)
- Terlecki, Olgierd. (1972), Poles in the Italian Campaign, 1943–1945, Interpress Publishers.
- Steven J. Zaloga, Poland 1939: The birth of Blitzkrieg, Osprey Publishing 2002, ISBN 1-84176-408-6.
