= Maria Kownacka =

Polish writer, translator and editor

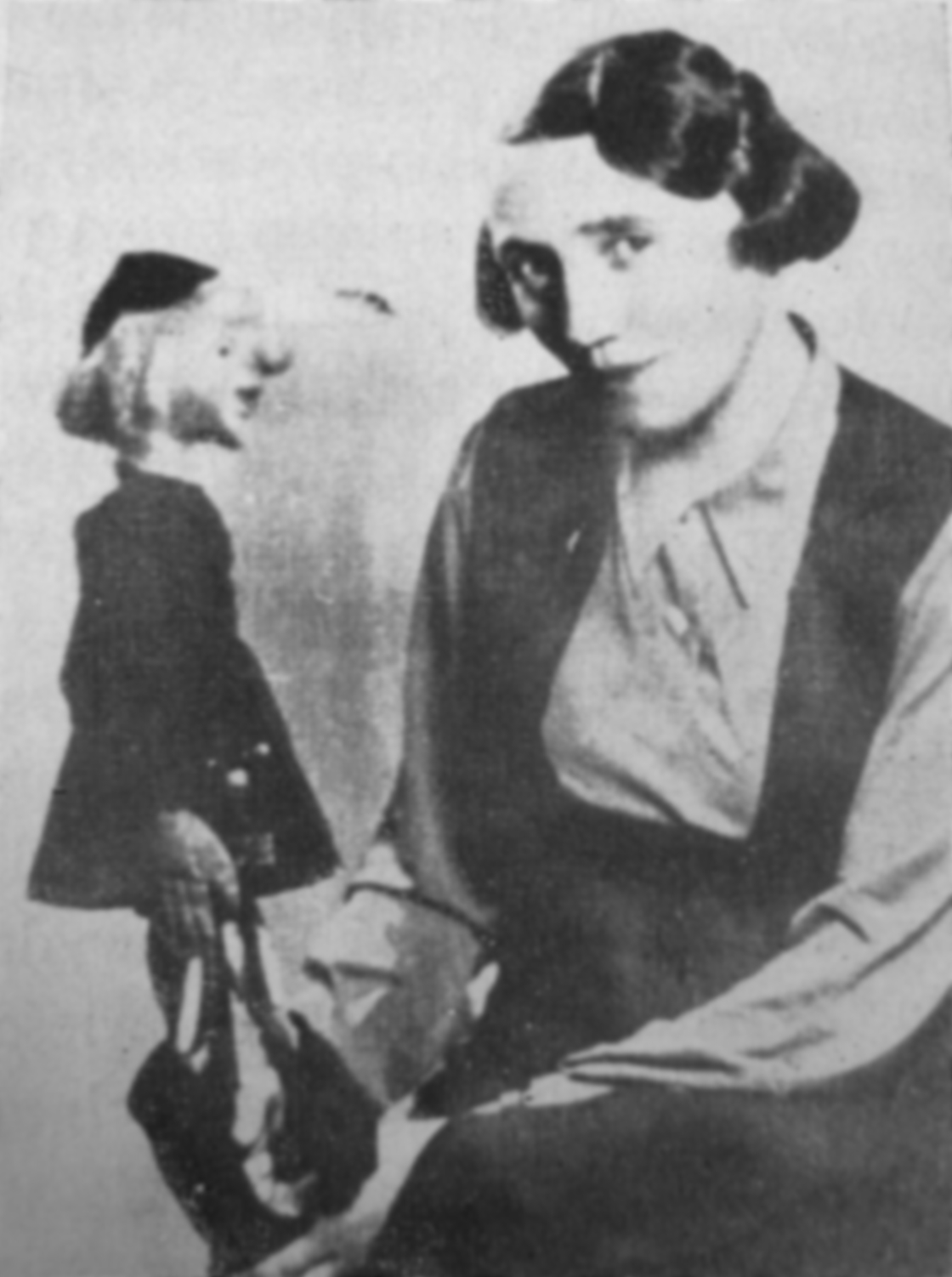
- Born: Maria Kownacka; 11 September 1894; Słup, Privislinsky Krai, Russian Empire
- Died: 27 February 1982 (aged 87); Warsaw, Polish People's Republic
- Occupations: Writer, teacher
- Writing career
- Genres: Fiction, children's literature
- Notable work: Plastusiowy pamiętnik

Maria Kownacka (11 September 1894 – 27 February 1982) was a Polish writer, translator and editor, specializing in children's literature. She was a long-time writer of Płomyk. Her best-known work is the series of books about "Plastuś", that began with Plastusiowy pamiętnik (1936).

== Biography ==
Kownacka was born on 11 September 1894 in Słup, partitioned Poland. She became a village schoolteacher at the age of 18, teaching in Dębowa Góra in 1914. From 1915 to 1918 she worked as a teacher in Minsk, where she also studied literature. As she was teaching in Polish, her activities were considered part of the illegal underground activism. It is around that time she also begun her career as a writer. Later she founded her own school in Krzywda on land owned by a relative. As she did not have sufficient funds to buy books, she wrote down her own stories for the children.

In 1919 she debuted as a writer, with her first work published in magazines for children, Płomyk and Płomyczek.

Due to a disease of the throat, she was forced to abandon her budding career as a teacher. She moved to Warsaw where she worked as a librarian in the Ministry of Agricultural Reforms and was an educational activist for children, active in the Workers Association of Children's Friends. In 1931 she moved to a house in Żolibórz, which would later become a museum dedicated to her. Also that year she published the first part of her best known work, Plastusiowy pamiętnik, in Płomyk (lit. the Diary of a Plasteline Man, about the adventures of a small red character made out of plastelne). It would be published in the book form in 1936 and would become one of the classics of Polish children's literature, and part of the Polish elementary school curriculum.

By 1939 she published eight books, including collections of short stories for children Bajowe bajeczki i świerszczykowe skrzypeczki, czyli o straszliwym smoku i dzielnym szewczyku, prześlicznej królewnie i królu Gwoździku (1935), Kukuryku na ręczniku (1936) and a stage play Cztery mile za pięć (1937). She was also the chief dramaturgist of the doll theater Teatr Baj.

In occupied Poland, she engaged in underground education for children and continued to write children's stories for the underground press, even during the Warsaw Uprising. During this time she contributed to the resistance-published children's magazine "Jawnutka".

She continued publishing children's literature after the war: Kajtkowe przygody (1948), Tajemnica uskrzydlonego serca (1948), Dzieci z Leszczynowej Górki (with Zofia Malicka, 1952), Rogaś z Doliny Roztoki (1957), Szkoła nad obłokami (1958), Za żywopłotem (1971), Na tropach węża Eskulapa (with Kazimierz Garstka, 1980). In 1963 she also co-authored (with Maria Kowalewska a children's encyclopedia about nature, Głos przyrody.

She died on 27 February 1982 in Warsaw. She was buried in the Powązki Cemetery.

== Awards ==
She received the:

- Silver Cross of Merit (1948)
- Officer's Cross of the Order of Polonia Restituta (1952)
- Order of the Smile (1971)
- Medal of the Commission of the National Education (1975)
- Orle Pióro (1978)

== Remembrance ==
Her house in Warsaw became a small museum (Memorial Room of Maria Kownacka) open to the public in 1990.

Many kindergartens in Poland are named after characters from her books.

In 2016 a biography of her, Kownacka. Ta od Plastusia, was published.
