= Bohdan Butenko =

Polish cartoonist (1931–2019)

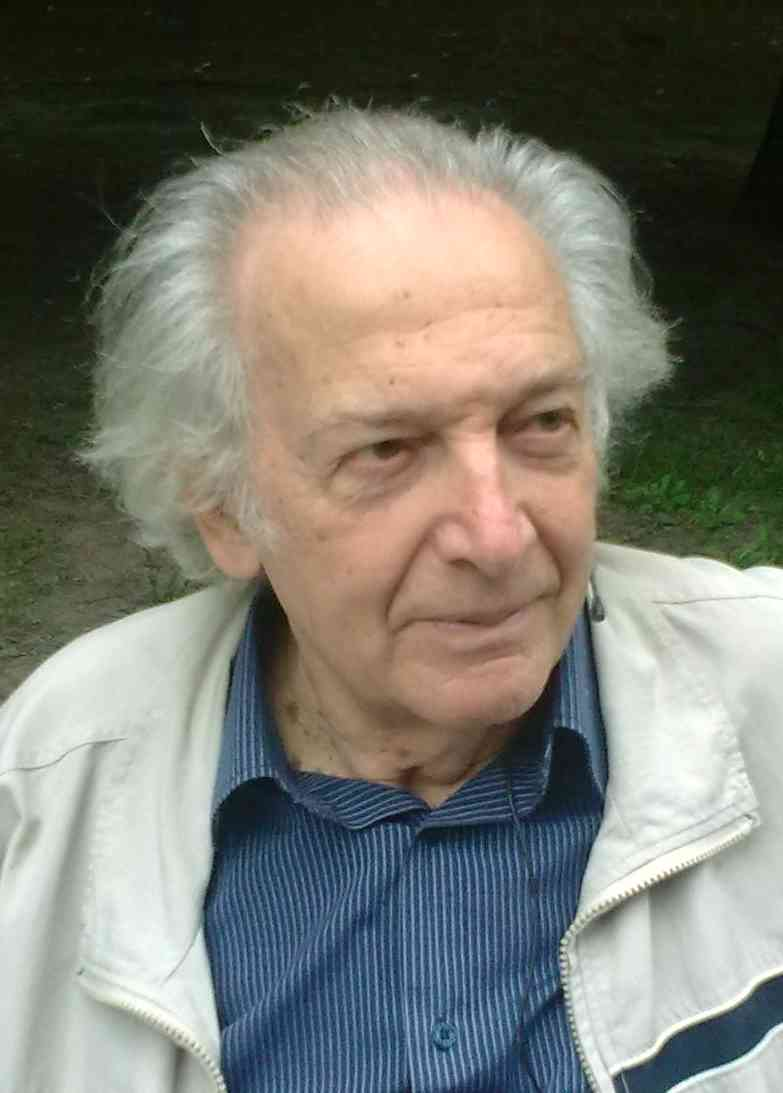
- Born: Bohdan Butenko; 8 February 1931 Bydgoszcz, Poland
- Died: 14 October 2019 (aged 88)
- Areas: Cartoonist, Writer, Penciller, Artist, Inker, Letterer, Colourist
- Notable works: Gapiszon, Kwapiszon, Gucio i Cezar

Bohdan Butenko (8 February 1931 – 14 October 2019) was a Polish cartoonist, illustrator, comic book writer and artist, as well as puppet designer.

His notable works include the comic series Kwapiszon, Gapiszon (Scatterbrain) cartoons, as well as Gucio i Cezar comics (written by Krystyna Boglar). He published his cartoons in numerous children's magazines, such as Płomyk, Płomyczek, Miś, Świerszczyk, as well as the magazines Szpilki and Przekrój, and illustrated numerous children's books.

He was awarded the Order of Polonia Restituta in 2011 and Order of the Smile in 2012.
