= Jan Brzoza =

- Józef Worobiec / Józef Wyrobiec
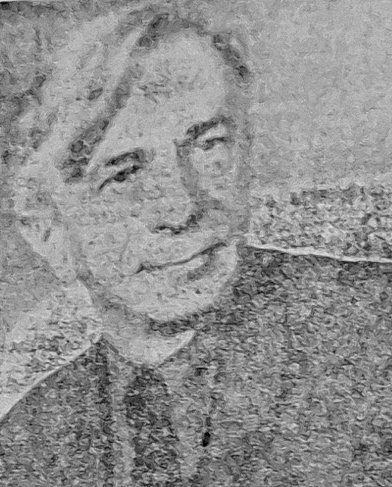
- Born: 10 December 1900; Kingdom of Galicia and Lodomeria, Lviv
- Died: 17 November 1971 (aged 70); Silesian Voivodeship, Myszków
- Resting place: Katowice
- Citizenship: Second Polish Republic; USSR; Polish People's Republic
- Occupations: writer, journalist, publicist, radio-host,
- Writing career
- Pen name: Jan Brzoza
- Language: Polish
- Genre: Socialist realism
- Subject: workers' life
- Notable works: Diaries of the unemployed, Children, Building an edifice, Earth, The Ninth Battalion
- Notable awards: Order of the Banner of Labor (2nd class)

Jan Brzoza, real name Józef Worobiec or Józef Wyrobiec (10 December 1900 – 17 November 1971) was a Polish writer, publicist, radio-host, Communist activist and one of the founders of the proletarian literature in Poland.

== Biography ==
Józef Worobiec was born in a Ukrainian working-class family (father Antoni and mother Katarzyna or Aniela). He was a carpenter by education.

He made his debut in 1932 with the novel Diaries of the unemployed (in Polish: Pamiętnikiem bezrobotnego), unexpectedly winning a special award established for unemployed youth by the Institute of Social Economy (IGS – Instytut Gospodarstwa Społecznego) at the peak of the economic crisis. This novel attracted the attention of Lviv writers and publishers, and for the future writer, it was the beginning of his literary career. Since then, he dedicated himself to a literary creativity. Since 1933, he was a member of the Lviv branch of the Polish Writers' Trade Union. Most of his works are devoted to peasant and working themes.

In 1936, he published the novel Children (Dzieci), describing the Lviv newspapers' environment. The other novel Building an edifice (Budowali gmach) about construction site workers and their strike was issued in 1938.

From 1921, Jan Brzoza was a member of the Communist Party of Western Ukraine. He participated in the Lviv Ant-Fascist Congress of Cultural Workers in 1936.

From 1939 to 1941, he was a member of the Ukrainian Writers' Union and later an activist of the Union of Polish Patriots.

In 1944–1945, Brzoza was the editor of the Lviv newspaper Czerwony Sztandar (Red Banner). After World War II he moved to Poland where lived in Silesia. Up to 1947, he was the cultural editor of the Katowice newspaper Trybuna Robotnicza (Workers' Tribune), then in 1947-1956 he led the Katowice branch of the Polish Writers' Union.

He was elected deputy of the Sejm of the Polish People's Republic in 1957–1961 years.

Brzoza died in Myszków in 1971 and is buried in Katowice.

== Recognition ==
He was awarded the Polish Order of the Banner of Labour (II class).

== Works ==
- Diaries of the unemployed (Pamiętnik bezrobotnego), 1933
- Children (Dzieci), 1936
- Building an edifice (Budowali gmach), 1938
- Earth (Ziemia), 1948
- The Ninth Battalion (Dziewiąty battalion), 1953
- Lodzia tramwajarka, 1958
- The story "Beskyde Nights" (Beskidzkie noce), 1964
- My literary adventures (Moje przygody literackie), 1967
- Return from America (Powrót z Ameryki), 1966
- Good day has come (Przyszedł dobry dzień), 1971

== Literature ==
- Włodzimierz Maciąg, Literatura Polski Ludowej 1944–1964, Warszawa 1973, s. 471.
- Maciej Matwijów, Walka o lwowskie dobra kultury w latach 1945–1948, Wrocław 1996.
- Jacek Trznadel, Kolaboranci: Tadeusz Boy-Żeleński i grupa komunistycznych pisarzy we Lwowie 1939–1941, Komorów 1998, s. 231.
- „Rocznik Literacki” 1971, s. 625.
- Jerzy Kwiatkowski: Dwudziestolecie międzywojenne. Wyd. III – 5 dodruk. Warszawa: Wydawnictwo Naukowe PWN, 2012, s. 301–302, seria: Wielka Historia Literatury Polskiej. ISBN 978-83-01-13851-6.

== See also ==
- Katowice Forum
