= Central Bureau Communists of Poland =

The Central Bureau Communists of Poland (Polish: Centralne Biuro Komunistów Polski or CBKP; Russian: Центральное бюро коммунистов Польши) was a group of Polish Communists in the Soviet Union during World War II, hand-picked by the Russian Secretariat of the Central Committee (BKK) with the aim of assisting in the takeover of power in Poland. It was a secret structure initially, active between January and August 1944, and closely affiliated with the Soviet Central Committee of the Communist Party.

The Bureau was organized between January and February 1944 based on a decree by the Secretariat of the Central Committee of the All-Union Communist Party (Bolsheviks) regarding the takeover of power in postwar Poland. The founding date was January 10, 1944, when the Office manifesto has been issued officially. The Polish members of the Bureau declared themselves to have an overriding role over the PPR. The CBKP was an internal structure, and its personnel composition remained secret for the outside world even when others were informed of its very existence. The PPR authorities learned about the CBKP from a telegram received at the beginning of August 1944 in Lublin, similar to the PPR Secretary General Władysław Gomułka who was informed about it on July 18, 1944 in Warsaw.

== Leadership ==
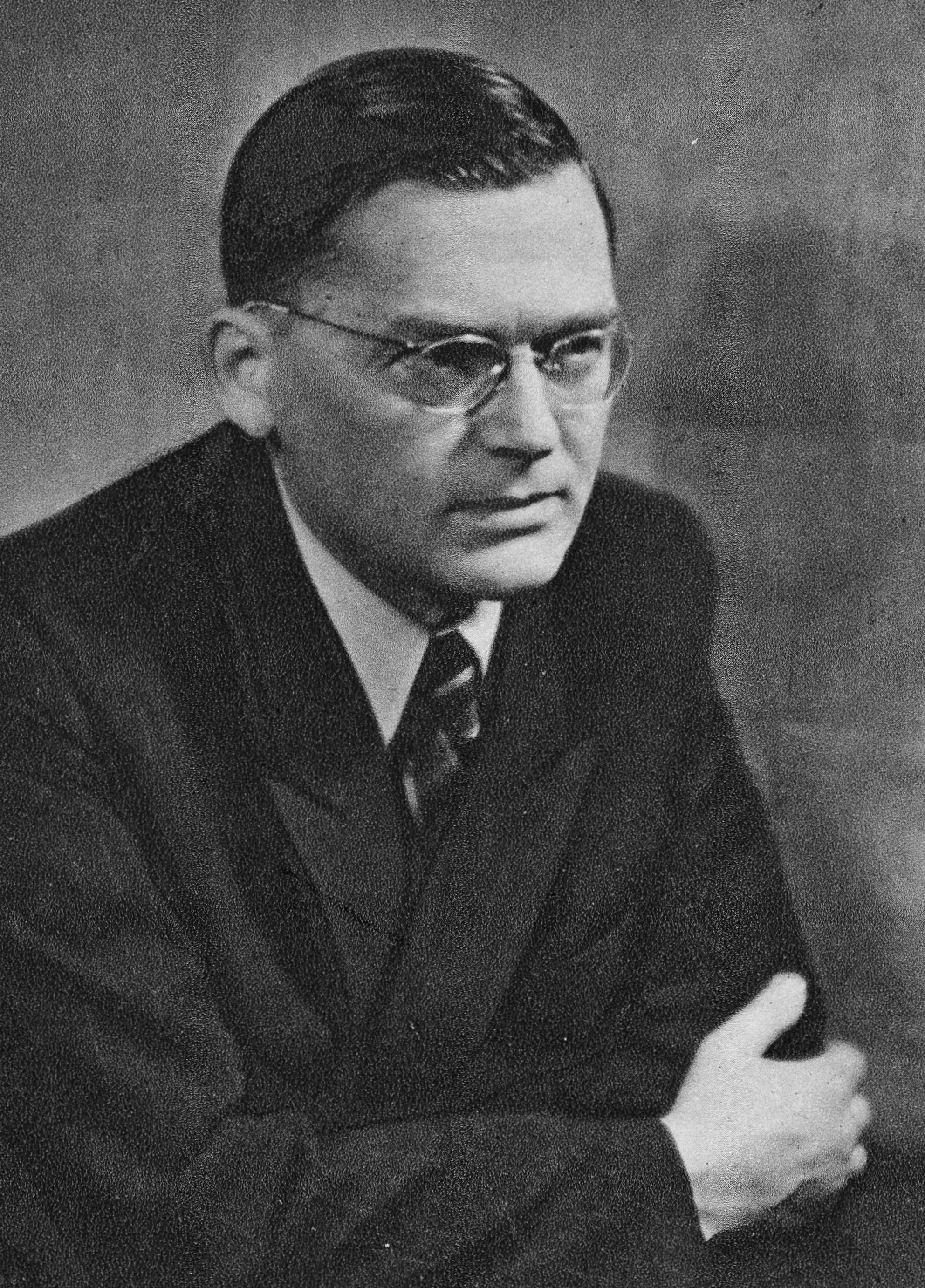
Aleksander Zawadzki

Management of CBKP included: Aleksander Zawadzki - Chairman, Stanisław Radkiewicz - Secretary, Karol Świerczewski - Member, Jakub Berman - Member, Wanda Wasilewska - Member, Hilary Minc - Plenipotentiary, and Stefan Wierbłowski - Plenipotentiary.

Berman was de facto in charge of the Bureau. The seven members were all approved by the Kremlin and had a significant impact on the Communists in Poland, as well as the Berling troops in the Soviet Union and in the country. Zawadzki, as CBKP chairman, was to hold the talks with representatives of the Soviet government and the Central Committee of the Bolshevik Party. Together with Swierczewski, he was to keep watch over the army's political division and deal with the expansion of the Corps. Wasilewska was responsible for the activities of the Polish Patriots' Association. The internal affairs belonged to Berman, who, along with Radkiewicz, managed the Office. Minc was put in charge of developing a draft of future socio-economic policy in Poland. The propaganda matters belonged to Wierblowski.

== Activities ==
CBKP was tasked with sovietizing the Executive Board of the Polish Patriots' Union along with the entire organization after the concept of PKN was abandoned. It had a say in all national affairs and the decisions of the PPR as well as its subordinate National State Council. The Bureau deliberated whether the PPR was not too 'sectarian'. It advised Gomułka to mitigate too harsh a wording on nationalization of industry. The office made sure that the formation of the local councils would not be perceived by the Poles as an attempt at sovietization. Also, the Bureau was in charge of filling the posts in the ZPP, the First Polish Army Corps in the USSR, and then in the Polish Army in the USSR. It led the search and record of Polish communists in the USSR, established the Polish Communist Partisan Staff, co-decided on the composition of the Polish National Liberation Committee and the content of the PKWN manifesto. In August 1944 the members of the office created the PPR Politburo which included Władysław Gomułka, Boleslaw Bierut, Jakub Berman, Hilary Minc and Aleksander Zawadzki (the last three of the CBKP team). In August 1944, the CBKP office was replaced with the Central Committee of the PPR in Moscow, which operated until 1948. In 1948, the group of former CBKP members removed Gomułka from the post of PPR secretary, in all actuality taking over the leadership of the party.
