= Stryjkowski =

The Polish surname of Stryjkowski was borne by at least two notable personalities:

- Maciej Stryjkowski (alias Strykowski; c. 1547 – c. 1593), a poet and historian.
- Julian Stryjkowski (born Pesach Stark, 1905 – 1996), a writer.
