= Czerwony Sztandar (Lviv newspaper) =

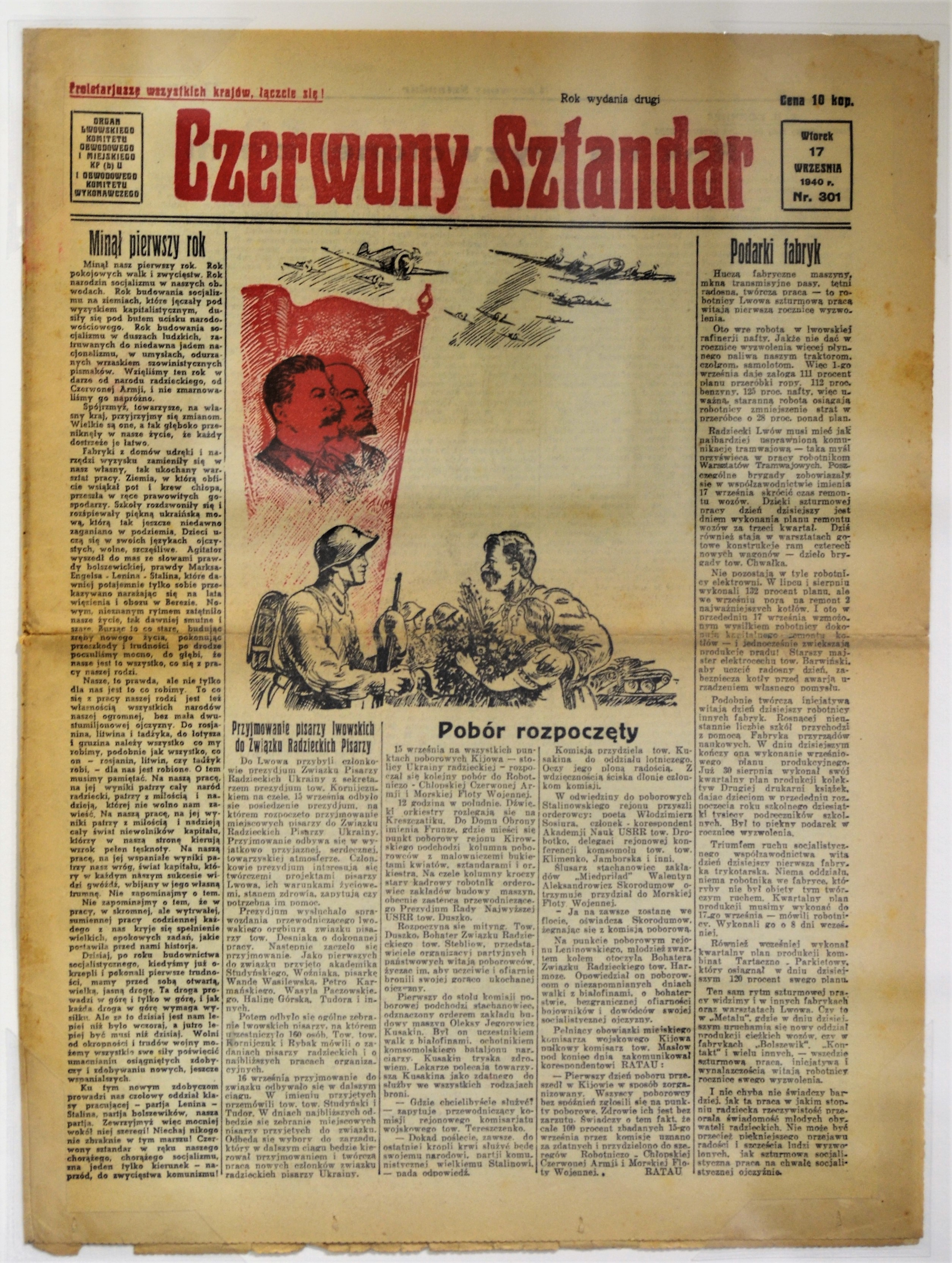
- 17 September 1941 issue
- Type: Daily
- Founded: 5 October 1939
- Ceased publication: June 1941
- Language: Polish
- Headquarters: Lviv
- Circulation: 40,000

Czerwony Sztandar (Polish pronunciation: [t͡ʂɛrˈvɔ.nɘ ˈʂtan.dar], English: Red Banner) was a Polish language daily newspaper, published by the Soviet occupation authorities in the city of Lwów (Lviv, Ukraine), between 5 October 1939 and June 1941, and then again between 1944 and 1950. Its circulation was 40,000 copies daily and the publication contained Soviet propaganda against the Second Polish Republic, clergy and the defeated Polish state authorities. The editor of the newspaper was Jan Brzoza.

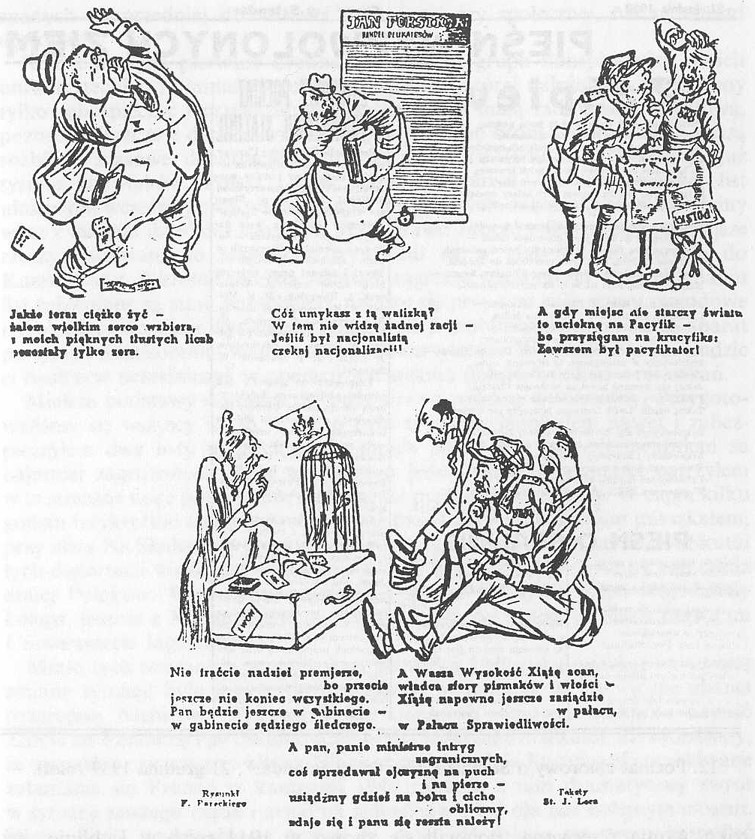
Satirical cartoon published in the September 1940 issue of Czerwony Sztandar

Among writers who published there were Wanda Wasilewska, Julian Stryjkowski, Lucjan Szenwald, Stanisław Jerzy Lec, Władysław Broniewski, Janina Broniewska, Tadeusz Boy-Żeleński and Leon Chwistek. In November 1939, a declaration of Polish writers was published in support of the incorporation of the Western Ukraine into Soviet Union.

== See also ==
- Nowe Widnokręgi
