= Wanda Wasilewska =

Polish politician, novelist and journalist (1905–1964)

- Polish: Wanda Wasilewska; Ukrainian: Ванда Львівна Василевська; Russian: Ванда Львовна Василевская
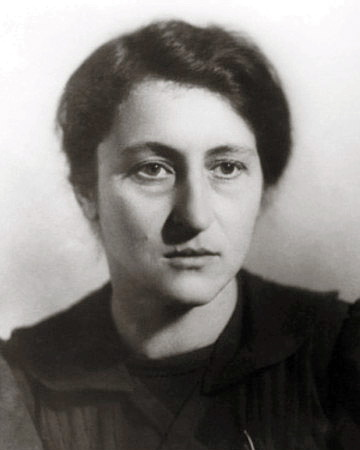
- Born: 21 January 1905; Kraków, Austria-Hungary
- Died: 29 July 1964 (aged 59); Kiev, Ukrainian SSR, Soviet Union
- Resting place: Baikove Cemetery
- Citizenship: Poland; Soviet Union
- Education: Jagiellonian University
- Occupations: Prose writer, poet, playwright, screenwriter, editor, political activist
- Spouse(s): Roman Szymański (1925–31), Marian Bogatko (1936–40), Oleksandr Korniychuk (1940–64)
- Children: Ewa Wasilewska (with Roman Szymański)
- Writing career
- Pen name: Wanda Woskowska
- Language: Polish language
- Genres: Novel, story
- Notable awards: Stalin Prize first degree (1943), Stalin Prizes second degree (1946), Stalin Prizes second degree (1952), Order of the Cross of Grunwald 1st. Class, Order of Lenin
- Movement: Socialist realism

Wanda Wasilewska (Polish pronunciation: [ˈvanda vaɕiˈlɛfska]), also known by her Russian name Vanda Lvovna Vasilevskaya (Russian: Ва́нда Льво́вна Василе́вская) (21 January 1905 – 29 July 1964), was a Polish and Soviet novelist and journalist and a left-wing political activist.

She was a socialist who became a devoted communist. She fled the German attack on Warsaw in September 1939 and took up residence in Soviet-occupied Lviv and eventually in the Soviet Union.

She was a founding member of the Union of Polish Patriots and played an important role in the creation of the 1st Tadeusz Kościuszko Infantry Division. The division developed into the Polish People's Army and fought on the Eastern Front during World War II.

Wasilewska was a trusted consultant to Joseph Stalin, and her influence was essential to the establishment of the Polish Committee of National Liberation in July 1944 and to the formation of the Polish People's Republic.

== Biography ==
=== Before World War II ===
Wasilewska was born, the second of three daughters, on 25 January 1905 in Kraków, Austrian Poland. Her father was Leon Wasilewski, a Polish Socialist Party (PPS) politician and first foreign minister of the newly re-emerging independent Poland. Her mother, Wanda Zieleniewska, was also a PPS member and the young Wasilewska had gotten to know the party leaders at home. From 1923, she studied Polish language and Polish literature at the Jagiellonian University in Kraków, where several years later she acquired her doctorate. While studying, she became involved with the Union of Independent Socialist Youth (ZNMS, allied with the PPS) and the Society of Workers' Universities. From the early 1930s, Wasilewska was strongly involved in women's issues and gender equality. Her attitude was exemplified by her own personal conduct as well as her work in the Women's Section of the PPS. However, she eventually chose to emphasize in her activism the broader class issues, remarked that it was easier to deal with men and criticized Warsaw feminists for coloring their movement with "feminism of half a century ago".

Wasilewska joined the PPS as a student. She was a member of the main party council in 1934–37. She served there with her father, whose connections turned out helpful at the various stages and vicissitudes of her career in Poland. Wasilewska later wrote of her student PPS years: "We had a lot of trouble with the communists because they were adamant about carrying out actions that could lead to bloodshed and we thought that was something that should not be done. Rather, we were into innocent skirmishes with the police ... ". Her radicalism grew gradually from the early 1930s and she began viewing the socialists as former revolutionaries turned conformists, compromised by collaboration with state authorities. Writing to her mother in November 1931, Wasilewska characterized herself as "turning increasingly Bolshevik", and in the spring of 1932, she joined a radical youth faction that pushed for confrontation with the Sanation regime and advocated joint action with the communists within the newly established Popular Front alliance. At that time she wrote to her mother of the "desperation of the people" and concluded: "the communists will do something or we will, or we together with the communists". As Wasilewska drew closer to the communists, her relations with the PPS deteriorated and she lost her seat in the party council, but never left the organization.

Having finished her studies, Wasilewska started working as a secondary school teacher in Kraków, but lost her job when the school authorities refused to extend her contract because of her leftist views. With her husband Marian Bogatko, also dismissed from work as a strike organizer, in autumn 1934, they moved to Warsaw, where Wasilewska became involved with the Polish section of the International Red Aid, an organization concerned with helping political prisoners and their families, and the Polish League for the Defense of Human and Citizens' Rights. Wasilewska found employment in the Editorial Division of the Polish Teachers' Union. She met there and befriended Janina Broniewska, the wife of revolutionary poet Władysław Broniewski; Janina's radical views would significantly influence Wasilewska. Wasilewska was a journalist for various left-wing newspapers, among them Naprzód, Robotnik, Dziennik Popularny, Oblicze Dnia and Lewar, and the chairperson of the Płomyk and Płomyczek monthlies for children. Płomyk was published under the auspices of the Teachers' Union and its March 1936 issue, Wasilewska devoted entirely to the promotion of communist models of upbringing as practised in the Soviet Union. In the aftermath, she was attacked in the Polish parliament by Prime Minister Felicjan Sławoj Składkowski, the printing ended up confiscated by the authorities, government restrictions and oversight were imposed on the activities of the Teachers' Union, and Wasilewska lost her job at the Editorial Division. Following this she was offered employment as the editor of the short lived Gazetka Miki for which, due to her notoriety, she wrote under the pen name Wanda Woskowska. Wasilewska was often criticised for her radical left-wing views and supported an alliance of all the left-wing parties, including the communists, against the ruling Sanation. Wasilewska was closely associated with the communists from the mid-1930s. In May 1936 Wasilewska, among other left-wing Polish and Western Ukrainian writers, participated in the Lviv Anti-Fascist Congress of Cultural Workers. The gathering of intellectuals and cultural activists passed a resolution declaring their support for international humanist values and opposition to fascism, nationalism, capitalism, imperialism and war; it did not invoke a Soviet leadership. Wasilewska left the congress convinced that "today the place of the writer, of the artist is among the proletariat of towns and villages, fighting for its liberation". Among the labour actions actively supported by Wasilewska was the 1937 strike of the Polish Teachers' Union, coordinated by her together with Janina Broniewska.

In Poland Wasilewska, despite her own established position, was known as "Leon's daughter". Leon Wasilewski died in December 1936. Wasilewska recounted her comrades and communists bringing to his funeral a wreath with an inscription that read: "For Wanda's father". It is not clear what Wasilewska's position was on Stalin's persecution and extermination of Polish communists and the 1938 dissolution of the Communist Party of Poland ordered by the Comintern (she seems to have justified a "necessity" of "certain actions", given the pressure and isolation that the Soviet state was subjected to), but on the eve of World War II she was a firm supporter of the Soviet Union, which she saw as the only force capable of stopping fascism. Wasilewska was highly regarded and accomplished in the field of social work. Helping the needy, especially children, was her natural inclination and passion. Early in the period of her studies Wasilewska met Roman Szymański, a mathematics student and popular PPS activist. They married and had a daughter Ewa. Szymański, however, died of typhus in August 1931. Later the same year Wasilewska met Marian Bogatko, a construction worker active in the PPS. Their successful relationship, purposely not sanctioned by traditional marriage, became a formal marriage in late 1936, when Wasilewska and Bogatko needed documents to travel to the Soviet Union. Bogatko was murdered by Soviet agents in May 1940 in Lviv. At that time Wasilewska was already a delegate to the Supreme Soviet of the Soviet Union. There are different versions of what had happened or who was the actual target. Nikita Khrushchev later wrote: "Wasilewska believed that it was not the case of premeditation and continued active work"; according to him, Bogatko was killed by mistake.

=== During World War II ===
After the Invasion of Poland by Nazi Germany in September 1939, Wasilewska, like hundreds of thousands of other Poles, fled to the east and following Stalin's directions ended up in Lviv (after the Soviet invasion of Poland a part of the Soviet-occupied zone). Like other Polish citizens, she soon automatically became a Soviet citizen, but unlike many she was enthusiastic about the historic turn of events and Poland's prospects under the Soviet tutelage that she expected; she thought it would promote both the national and social liberation of Poles. Wasilewska officially joined as a member the (All-Union Communist Party (Bolsheviks) already in September 1939. According to Khrushchev, the Soviets worked with Wasilewska on organizing the Polish intelligentsia members present in their zone and turning them into Soviet allies. Several dozen Polish literary figures indeed joined the Federation of Soviet Writers of Ukraine in the fall of 1940. Wasilewska prevented a complete Ukrainization of the University of Lviv: because of her intervention part of the Polish prewar faculty remained there and teaching in Polish was retained in some departments. Also in 1940, Wanda Wasilewska participated in the production of "Wind from the East" – a propaganda film which justified the Soviet Invasion of Poland. Wasilewska soon came into prominence as a Soviet loyalist and diplomatic arrangements were made to bring members of her immediate family and her associates from Warsaw to Lviv. Five Poles were exchanged for five Germans in a transaction that took place at what was then the Soviet-German border. Wasilewska's daughter Ewa moved to the Soviet zone, but Wanda's mother and Bogatko's brother refused to move there.

She was involved with various communist organisations uniting local Polish and Ukrainian communists. She was a journalist for Czerwony Sztandar ('The Red Banner'), a pro-Soviet newspaper printed in Lviv in Polish from October 1939. Czerwony Sztandar published a declaration signed by Polish writers, including Wasilewska, welcoming the "unification of Ukraine", meaning the incorporation of the southern part of Kresy into the Ukrainian Soviet Socialist Republic. In early 1940 Joseph Stalin, who favored Wasilewska among the Polish communists, awarded her a seat in the Supreme Soviet of the Soviet Union. She became literary director of the Polish Theatre in Lviv, replacing Broniewski, who was arrested by the NKVD. Wasilewska was also one of the founders, together with Jerzy Putrament, of the social-literary monthly Nowe Widnokręgi ('New Horizons'), published from March 1941 and revived in May 1942 with Alfred Lampe.

On 28 June 1940, Stalin received Wasilewska, an unofficial leader of Polish communists, at the Moscow Kremlin. The event initiated a reorientation of Soviet policies in regard to Poles, which was reported with concern by the German embassy in Moscow. As a result, a wide range of official political, military, social, cultural, educational and other Soviet-Polish projects and activities commenced in 1940 and continued during the years that followed.

After the German invasion of the Soviet Union, Wasilewska fled before the advancing Nazi army and in June 1941 arrived in Moscow. She joined the Red Army as a war correspondent and functionary of the Political Commandment, with the military rank of colonel. To agitate for the cause of the Great Patriotic War, she tirelessly traversed the many paths of the Soviet-German front, "everywhere impatiently awaited" by the soldiers. Wasilewska soon wrote the war novel Tęcza ('The Rainbow'), instantly translated into Russian. The novel earned her the Stalin Prize and based on it a film was made. In August 1941 she became chairman of the Polish section of the All-Slavic Anti-Fascist Committee.

According to Jakub Berman, the relationship between Stalin and Wasilewska became one of familiarity; she was free to contact him personally and had his private telephone number. Stalin made no secret of his confidence in Wasilewska, while she displayed considerable moral courage in her handling of the relationship.

Following a January 1943 letter written with Lampe to Vyacheslav Molotov and consultations with Stalin, Wasilewska became the head of the Union of Polish Patriots (Związek Patriotów Polskich, ZPP), a mass-membership political and social organization for Polish citizens in the Soviet Union, officially formed at its founding congress in Moscow in June 1943. The ZPP, where Wasilewska functioned as "Stalin's great trustee", was oriented toward the establishment of socialism in Poland; it facilitated the development of Poland's post-war government. Wasilewska was very involved in organizing material help for Poles dispersed in many parts of the Soviet Union and Polish schools for children. Nearly thirty thousand Polish children in the Soviet Union, many of them orphans, were taken care of by Wasilewska and her ZPP colleagues; most were returned to Poland after the war.

After the Soviets suspended relations with the Polish government-in-exile in late April 1943 (following the revelations of the Katyn massacre), Wasilewska wrote an article in Izvestia sharply critical of the Polish government, which was taken as a sign that no Soviet-Polish government rapprochement was in the offing. On 6 May 1943, in Wasilewska-edited Wolna Polska ('The Free Poland') periodical, the formation of the Polish 1st Tadeusz Kościuszko Infantry Division was announced. Wasilewska and Zygmunt Berling had appealed to Stalin for permission to create a Polish division already in September 1942. Now they accomplished their goal and Stalin's move signaled his definite intention to pursue Poland-related undertakings without regard to the government of Prime Minister Władysław Sikorski.

On 15 July 1943, the newly trained and equipped Polish army was shown to the public and the audience included foreign war correspondents. After the parade a press conference was given by Berling and Wasilewska, who spoke on behalf of the ZPP. In October, the Polish army fought the Germans for the first time in the Battle of Lenino. According to Wasilewska, she herself pressed for early deployment of the force. There was a perception of the need to demonstrate, before the Tehran Conference of the Allies, that the Soviet-allied Polish army was already engaged in combat, ahead of the army of Władysław Anders, which had left the Soviet Union. At Lenino the Poles suffered heavy, but not unusual for the Soviet front casualties. Nevertheless, Wasilewska was appalled by the losses and had the division withdrawn from combat for further training and expansion, until the middle of 1944. Following the battle, the ZPP took it upon itself to award official military medals of the Polish state, such as the Virtuti Militari and the Cross of Valour.

In July 1944, Wasilewska became deputy chief of the Polish Committee of National Liberation (PKWN), a provisional government sponsored by the Soviet Union and established in Lublin, in opposition to the Polish government-in-exile in London. On 6–7 August, together with Bolesław Bierut and Michał Rola-Żymierski, Wasilewska conducted in Moscow unsuccessful negotiations with Prime Minister Stanisław Mikołajczyk of the government-in-exile (he refused their offer of becoming prime minister of a communist-dominated government).

Already in 1942, Wasilewska presented to Ksawery Pruszyński the concept of "Poland of Bolesław Krzywousty", from the Oder to the Bug River. Geographical vision of post-war Poland, deprived of the "Kresy" eastern lands but compensated with the so-called Recovered Territories in the west, was formed in Wasilewska's discussions with Stalin. Back then, the Russian communists demanded reduction of a potentially hostile future Polish state to lands where ethnic Poles formed a majority of inhabitants. In July 1944, Wasilewska additionally secured Stalin's consent for the moving of Poland's western border in its southern portion from Nysa Kłodzka to Nysa Łużycka. It later caused problems at the Potsdam Conference, because the British wanted to preserve this part of Lower Silesia for the future German state.

Wasilewska explained away Stalin's deadly purges by arguing that death of an innocent person was preferable to the risk of demise of the Soviet Union. The persecutions and victims, she felt, were an unavoidable cost of future progress or resulted from licentious conduct by functionaries. She intervened when Poles whom she knew were deported to distant regions of the Soviet Union and engaged in relief activities, such as sending parcels to deportees. Wasilewska's interventions freed her fellow Polish communists (kept in detention by Lavrentiy Beria even after the official amnesty for Poles negotiated by the government of Władysław Sikorski), the poet Broniewski and his by then estranged wife Janina Broniewska. Broniewska, who went to Moscow and worked for Nowe Widnokręgi, took care of Wasilewska's daughter Ewa during Wasilewska's lengthy involvement at the German front. When the Polish People's Army was formed, Wasilewska and Broniewska pushed for the use as an emblem on soldier uniforms and elsewhere of a crownless Piast eagle taken from the restored sarcophagus of Bolesław III Wrymouth, a medieval ruler of Poland. The crownless eagle, contrary to the previously and historically used eagle with a crown, was accepted for the army and remained in exclusive use as the coat of arms of Poland throughout the period of existence of communist Poland (1945–89). 00

Stalin valued Wasilewska's opinion highly, even though (or in part because) she had no prewar background in the Communist Party of Poland. As she later wrote, during the war all the matters were settled through her to the detriment of input from other Polish communists, even though she had not sought a leadership role but rather took advantage of the opportunities as they arose.

=== After World War II ===
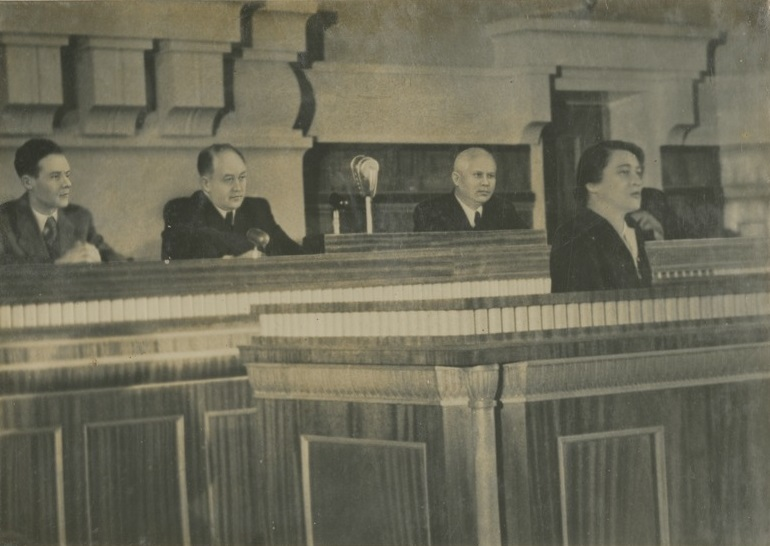
Wasilewska giving a speech in the Ukrainian SSR, 1948/49

After the war, Wasilewska decided to stay in the Soviet Union and retired from public life, thus rejecting the opportunity for becoming an active member of the political elites in communist Poland. She was involved in a long-term relationship with Ukrainian playwright and Soviet state official Oleksandr Korniychuk, with whom she moved to Kiev. Wasilewska had limited Russian and Ukrainian language abilities, but was a member of the Supreme Soviet for six terms. She often visited Poland, where a room was kept for her use at the villa of Broniewska in Warsaw. She was highly influential in the affairs of Poland and consulted by the country's top leaders, including Bierut and Berman. Especially before Gomułka's ascent to power in 1956, Wasilewska's visits followed invitations from the authorities; afterwards they were less frequent and of a more private character. According to communist historian Andrzej Werblan, Wasilewska and Gomułka were politically incompatible. She made frequent foreign trips as an activist in the peace movement, including one to Stockholm in 1956.

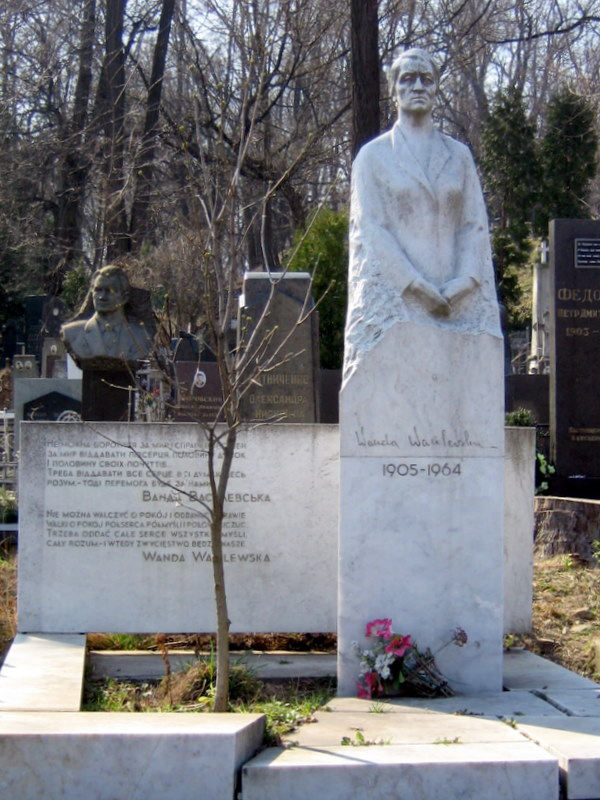
Grave of Wanda Wasilewska at the Baikove Cemetery

Wasilewska wrote to her friend Nikita Khrushchev to complain of the 1955 publication of Poemat dla dorosłych ('A Poem for Adults') by Adam Ważyk, which she saw as one of the manifestations of the increasingly present in Poland anti-socialist agitation. However, after Khrushchev's assumption of the Soviet leadership and his reforms, she seemed primarily preoccupied with her family affairs and by the tending her grandson Peter in particular. She was often visited by family members and friends from Poland. Among other guests Wasilewska and Korniychuk entertained was the writer John Steinbeck. She spent time with her husband in their dacha not far from Kiev, but the relationship eventually deteriorated. She developed heart and circulatory problems.

Wanda Wasilewska died on 29 July 1964 in Kiev and is buried in the Baikove Cemetery. Oleksandr Korniychuk, who outlived her by several years, was buried there in another grave.

== Role, assessments, influence and works ==
Wasilewska has "her place in Polish collective memory as a symbol of the establishment of the communist order after World War II".

Brought up in a patriotic, intellectual, left-wing but anti-Russian Polish establishment environment, Wanda Wasilewska gradually developed a communist identity and revolutionary outlook, to become a theorist, ideologue and promoter of communism in Poland. She was "strongly embedded in the historical and geopolitical context of her era" and blurred in her daily activities and works she produced the distinction between the public or political, and private aspects of her life. The transgressions she engaged in as a radical leftist were of many dimensions and involved transcending the borders of her gender, nationality, and social class (it amounted to "rejecting superstition", as she put it).

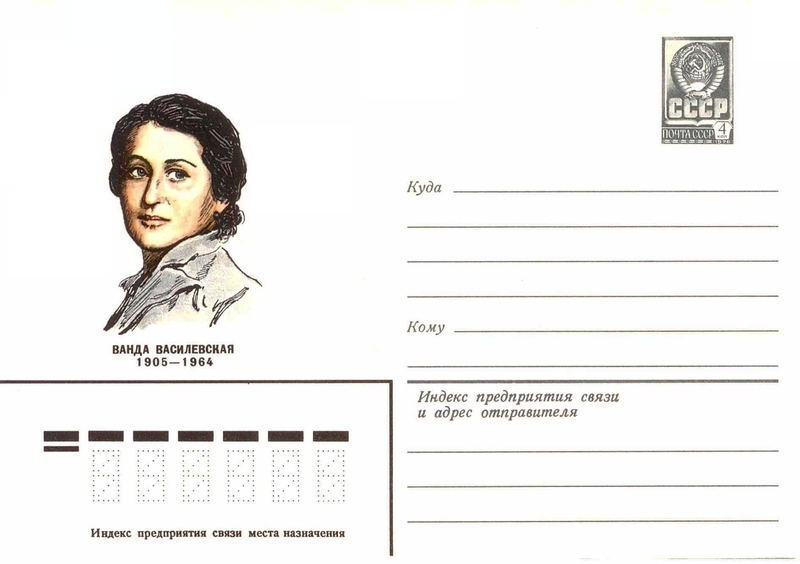
Soviet 1979 commemorative postal cover featuring a portrait of Wanda Wasilewska

Wasilewska writings were heavily socially and ideologically engaged. She accused Sanation Poland of gross discrimination of its citizens based on their rank (the elites vs. the masses) and ethnicity. She pointed to a combination of economic and nationalistic oppression of the working classes and the minorities by the industry and land owners and by people of the dominant Polish language and culture.

With the end of the war, Wasilewska removed herself from the position of power to assume other roles. As Władysław Gomułka saw it, later she must have had regretted the decision she made but had to live with it. She "played her role till the end", but in a letter to her mother complained about the many ailments she suffered from, ascribing them all to "nerves". Agnieszka Mrozik speculates that Wasilewska's diseased body expressed her reaction to "the corset of a monument which she was given to wear" and that she may have been "stuck" in a role which "involved – apart from the appearance of a fulfilled activist and writer – the appearance of a happy woman".

To some degree, Wasilewska might have been pushed out or discouraged from continuing political career in postwar Poland, because of being a lone woman in the Polish communist leadership or because of her image causing a problem for the new authorities (considered too closely associated with Stalin).

Depending on the political orientation of those who judged her and the propaganda needs of the moment, Wasilewska has been depicted in different, often extreme ways. She was a revolutionary icon of the new order and an embodiment of progress under Stalinism. Afterwards, in Gomułka years, the stress was on her military and social activities as she became a patriotic symbol in the national Romantic tradition. For those strongly opposed to communism, radical leftism or the Soviet domination of Poland, she has been a "monstrosity" and represented "pathology" and "betrayal"; labels such as "renegade", "traitor" and "collaborator" have commonly been used. In particular, her gender has been referenced to deny her as a woman individual agency and define her position relative to men, as in the primary characterizations of "Stalin's favorite" or "Leon's disgraced daughter". Adam Ciołkosz, Wasilewska's colleague and friend in her PPS years and an anti-communist émigré in post-war London, wrote "biographical sketches" about her. He patronizingly described Wasilewska as a well-meaning, even if sometimes rebellious (yet lacking truly radical credentials) woman of proper upbringing but limited intellectual ability and emotional maturity, who at the time of the Soviet invasion of Poland (September 1939) succumbed to a sudden onset of infatuation with the Soviet Union. Wasilewska's biography, according to Mrozik, has been "continuously rewritten and corrected" by those who wanted to "inscribe into her their own content". This makes it possible to see her as a "liminal character", used to mark "the boundaries of political periods and ideological attitudes". The great Pole, an outstanding writer and diplomat from her pre-1989 biographies became a "degenerate daughter of the Polish nation" afterwards. Such processing of Wasilewska narrative corresponded with the dominant at a given place and time historical narrative (of pre-1989 Poland, post-1989 Poland, or Polish émigré circles in the West after World War II).

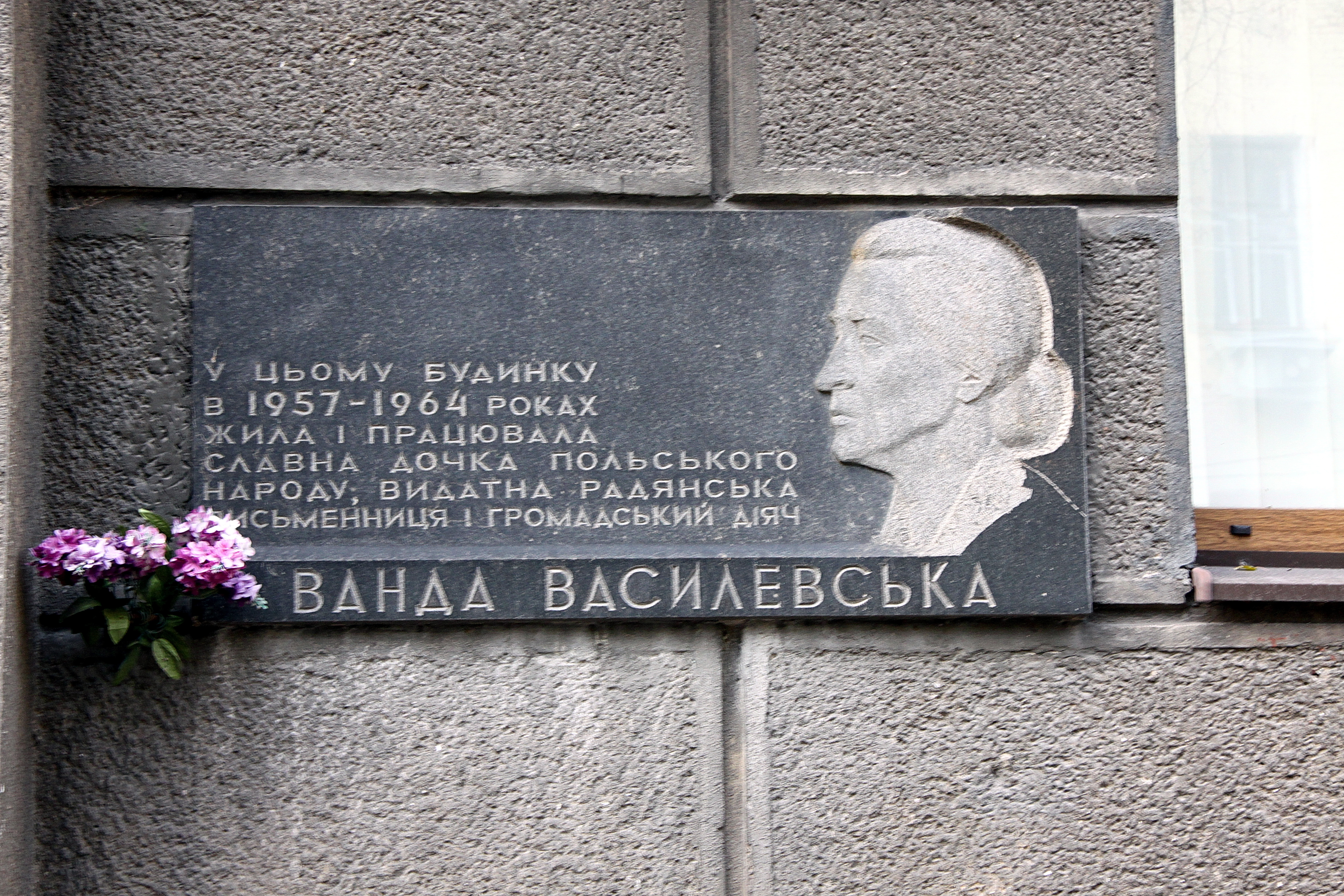
Memorial plaque in Kyiv, Ukraine

Wasilewska was one of the first Polish writers to follow the rules of socialist realism. She wrote several novels and a handful of poems. Oblicze Dnia ('The Face of Day') novel had the printing of its book edition stopped by Sanation censorship (it had already been issued in installments in the leftist Naprzód periodical). After an intervention by Wasilewska's father, the book was published in an expurgated form. However, a Russian translation and edition were soon produced. Around 1936, on several occasions the Soviet Embassy paid Wasilewska compensation for her books published in the Soviet Union. In the Soviet Union, where Wasilewska's literary works were much more appreciated than in Poland, the material she produced, including elements of her personal story, were turned, in accordance with the convention of socialist realism, into a model to be followed by the population.

In the early 1950s, Wasilewska and Korniychuk wrote a libretto for Kostiantyn Dankevych's opera Bohdan Khmelnytsky. After it became a target of ideologically based criticism, the authors submitted self-criticism and revised their work.

Wasilewska was a triple recipient of the Stalin Prize for literature (1943, 1946, 1952). During Stalin's lifetime she was considered a classic writer of Soviet literature and her works were included in the Soviet school curriculum. Her "collected works" were published in Moscow in six volumes in 1955. The first volume was translated into the Ukrainian language and published in Ukraine in 1966. However, after the death of Stalin, Wasilewska was largely forgotten as a writer.

The communist government in Poland named countless streets and schools after her and she was one of the most notable figures in communist society. After the war, some of her books were obligatory school reading.

- Królewski syn (1933)
- Oblicze Dnia (1934)
- Kryształowa Kula Krzysztofa Kolumba (1934)
- Ojczyzna (1935)
- Legenda o Janie z Kolna (1936)
- Ziemia w jarzmie (1938)
- Płomień na bagnach (1940)
- Pieśń nad Wodami (a trilogy: 1940, 1950, 1952)
- Tęcza (1944)
- Po prostu miłość (1944)
- Gdy światło zapłonie (1946)
- Gwiazdy w jeziorze (1950)
- Rzeki płoną (1952)
- Pokój na poddaszu (1954)
- Że padliście w boju (1958)

== Bibliography ==
- Aleksander Wat, Mój Wiek Warszawa 1990
- Helena Zatorska, Wanda Wasilewska, Warszawa 1977
- Adam Ciołkosz, Wanda Wasilewska: dwa szkice biograficzne, Polonia Book Fund: Londyn 1977
- Eleonora Salwa-Syzdek, Działalność Wandy Wasilewskiej w latach drugiej wojny światowej, Warszawa 1981
- Ed. Eleonora Salwa-Syzdek, Wanda Wasilewska we wspomnieniach, Warszawa 1982
- Eleonora Syzdek, W jednym życiu - tak wiele, Warszawa 1965
- Zmarła Wanda Wasilewska. Nowiny, p. 1–2, No. 179, 30 July 1964

== See also ==
- Rosa Luxemburg
- Maria Koszutska
- Małgorzata Fornalska
- Janina Broniewska
- Halszka Wasilewska (soldier)
- Alfred Lampe
- Jakub Berman
- Bolesław Bierut
- Władysław Gomułka
- Edward Ochab
