= Nowe Widnokręgi =

Polish-language magazine

Nowe Widnokręgi (Polish: New Horizons) was a Polish language magazine initially published monthly, later once every two weeks and served as the official organ of the communist Union of Soviet Writers. It was published from February till June 1941 in Soviet-occupied Lwów. Despite its orientation, it differed from the earlier publication Czerwony Sztandar, reflecting a more softened cultural policy of the Soviets vis-a-vis Polish culture.

Later, it was published in the Soviet hinterland. From 1943 it functioned as the organ of the Union of Polish Patriots, and its editor-in-chief was Wanda Wasilewska. Among the contributors of Nowe Widnokręgi were Mieczysław Jastrun, Stanisław Jerzy Lec, Leon Pasternak, Tadeusz Peiper, Julian Przyboś, Jerzy Putrament, Adam Ważyk, Tadeusz Boy-Żeleński, Janina Broniewska, Zofia Dzierżyńska, Adolf Bromberg, Julia Brystygier, Aleksander Dan, Emil Dziedzic, Halina Górska, Stefan Jędrychowski, Witold Kolski, Karol Kuryluk, Stanisław Wasylewski, Roman Werfel, and Jerzy Pomianowski.

The publication of the journal ceased in 1946.
