= Witos =

Witos is a Polish surname. Notable people with the surname include:

- Andrzej Witos (1878–1973), Polish politician and activist, brother of Wincenty
- Wincenty Witos (1874–1945), Polish politician
