= Alfred Lampe =

Polish politician and journalist

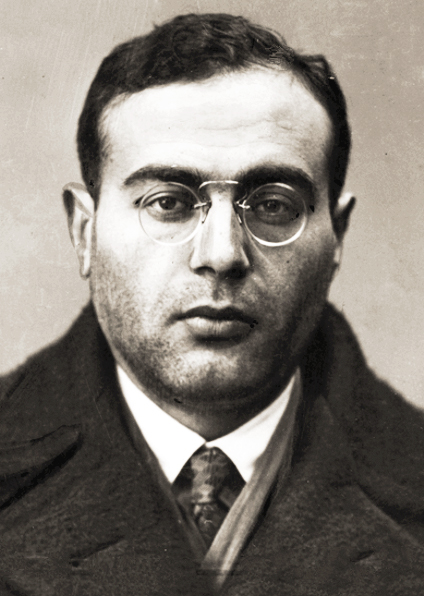

Member of the Politburo of the Communist Party of Poland
- In office 1929–1932

Secretary of the Young Communist League of Poland
- In office 1922–1929

Personal details
- Born: 14 May 1900 Warsaw, Congress Poland
- Died: 10 December 1943 (aged 43) Moscow, Soviet Union
- Resting place: Powązki Military Cemetery
- Party: Communist Party of Poland
- Other political affiliations: Poale Zion

Alfred Lampe (14 May 1900 – 10 December 1943) was a Polish communist politician and journalist.

== Biography ==
Lampe was born into a Jewish working-class family in Warsaw. He was a member of Poale Zion from 1918 to 1921. In 1921, he joined the Communist Party of Poland (KPP). In 1922, at the founding congress of the Young Communist League of Poland (ZMKwP), the youth wing of the KPP, he was made Secretary of the organization. In 1926, Lampe was also elected to the Central Committee of the KPP, and in 1929 he became a member of the Politburo.

In 1932, Lampe moved to the Soviet Union as a KPP representative to the Red International of Labor Unions in Moscow. After his return to Poland the following year, he was arrested and sentenced to 15 years in prison in 1935. At the outbreak of World War II in 1939, Lampe was freed and fled to Białystok (after the Soviet invasion of Poland a part of the Soviet-occupied zone). The rest of his life Lampe spent in the Soviet Union; he served there as editor of the Polish-language magazines Nowe Widnokręgi ('New Horizons') and Wolna Polska ('The Free Poland'). In 1943, together with Wanda Wasilewska, he co-founded the Union of Polish Patriots (ZPP). Participated in the organization's First Congress in June 1943. In the same year, Lampe also participated in the creation of the 1st Tadeusz Kościuszko Infantry Division.

In the Soviet Union, Lampe was an ideologist and planner of the future communist-led Poland. His book Miejsce Polski w Europie ('Poland's place in Europe') was published by the ZPP.

Lampe died of a heart attack in Moscow in December 1943. After the war, his ashes were interred at the Powązki Military Cemetery in Warsaw. He was posthumously awarded the Order of the Cross of Grunwald, 1st class.
