= Polish War Reparations Bureau =

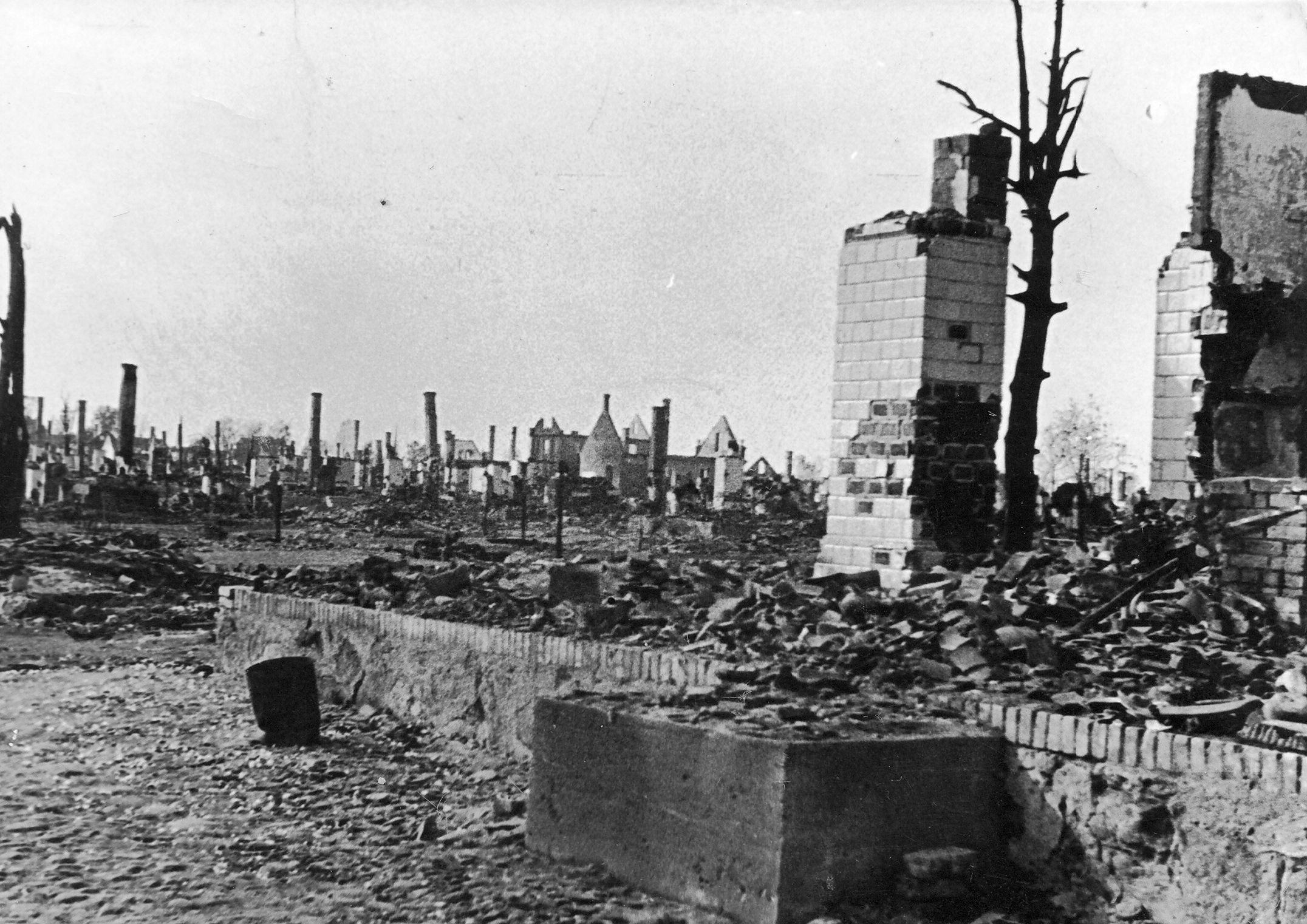
A completely destroyed Polish village - Sucha.

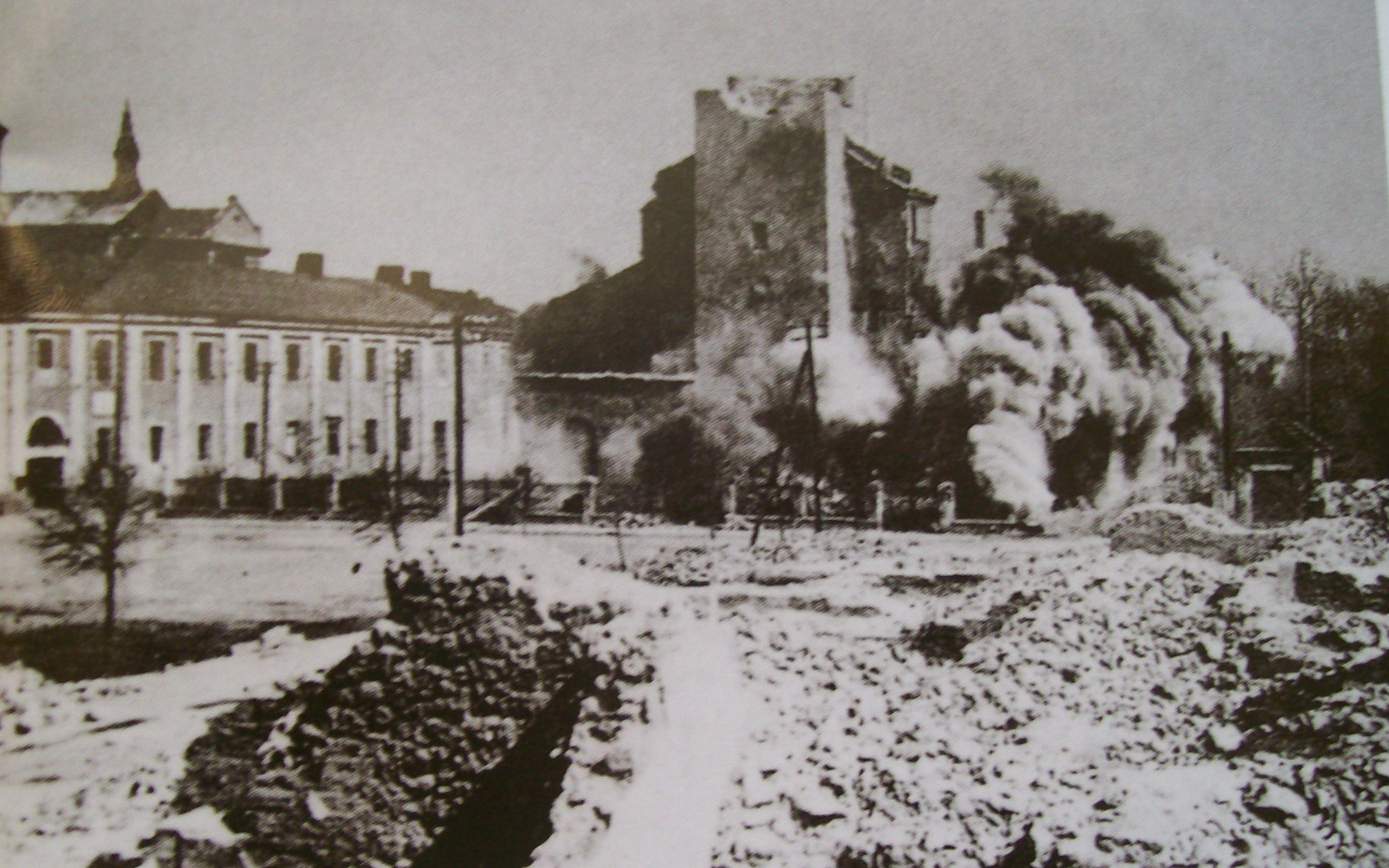
Wehrmacht blowing up Church of Saint Michał from the 13th century in Wieluń.

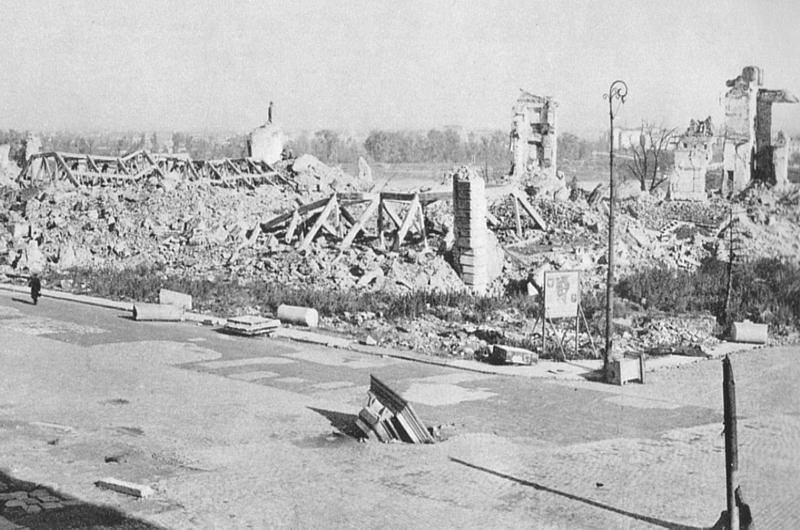
Ruins of the Royal Castle in 1945.

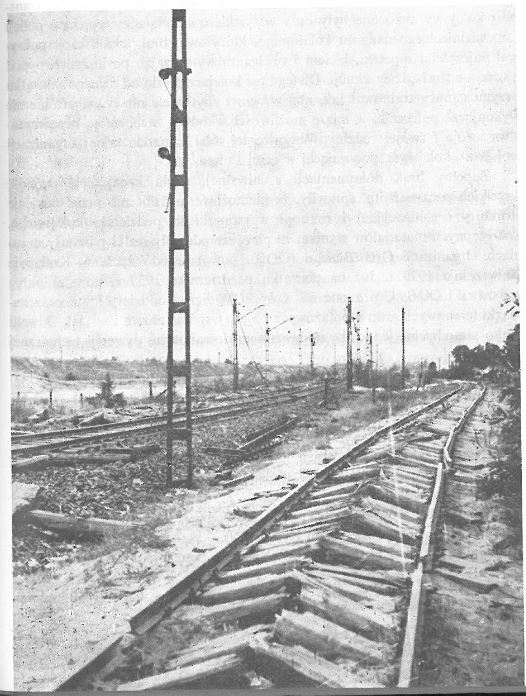
The railway line near Warsaw was destroyed by the retreating German troops - 1945

Biuro Odszkodowań Wojennych BOW (ang. Polish War Reparations Bureau) - institution established in 1945 by the Presidium of the Council of Ministers in Warsaw to assess the war losses suffered by Poland during the Second World War in 1939-1945. The office dealt with determining and estimating the war losses suffered by the Polish state, as well as private individuals in the field of material and cultural goods, coordinating work related to the compensation and recovery.

== History ==
The Military Compensation Center was first established institution at September 27, 1944 before the end of World War II, by decree Polish Committee of National Liberation. In 1947 Biuro Odszkodowań Wojennych prepared a report "Report on the losses and damages of war in Poland in 1939-1945" describing the number of material and biological Polish losses during the war.

During the war, Poland lost 6,028,000 persons of its community, of these 616,000 on account of immediate military action.

The losses sustained by the railways are put at 84%, those of the postal system and telecommunications — at 62%, those of the education system — at 60%, the material cultural assets were lost in 43%, the damage to forests — so hard to ameliorate — is calculated at 28%. But that is not the point of gravity. Poland has over a million citizens infected with tuberculosis, half a million invalids incapable of working, 22% of all Polish citizens have perished.

Biological losses of the Polish society General compilation "Report on the losses and damages of war in Poland in 1939-1945"
Specification	Number of persons in thousands	%
1. Loss of life — total; a) due to direct military action b) due to the occupiers’ terror	6.028 644; 5.384	100.0 10.7; 89.3
2. War invalidity (war invalids and civilian invalids — total); a) physical handicap b) mental handicap	590 530; 60	100.0 89.8; 10.2
3. Excess of tuberculosis instances (exceeding the average theoretical number of instances)	1.140	100.0

== Bibliography ==
- Work, Group (1947). "Sprawozdanie w przedmiocie strat i szkód wojennych Polski w latach 1939-1945” (eng. "Report on the losses and damages of war in Poland in 1939-1945") DJVU file (in Polish). Warszawa: Biuro Odszkodowań Wojennych.
- Góralski, Witold (2004). "Problem reparacji, odszkodowań i świadczeń w stosunkach polsko-niemieckich 1944-2004" (eng. The problem of reparations, compensation and benefits in Polish-German relations 1944-2004) (in Polish). Warszawa: Polski Instytut Spraw Międzynarodowych. ISBN 9788389607300.
- Madajczyk, Czesław (1970). "Polityka III Rzeszy w okupowanej Polsce" (eng. The policy of the Third Reich in occupied Poland) (in Polish). Warszawa: Państwowe Wydawnictwo Naukowe.
- Jezierski, Andrzej (2010). "Historia gospodarcza Polski" (eng. Polish economic history) (in Polish). Warszawa: Key Text Wydawnictwo. ISBN 9788387251710.

== Links ==
- Description of materials collected by the Office of War Compensation at the Presidium of the Council of Ministers in Warsaw archived in the Archives of Modern Records.
- Report on the losses and damages of war in Poland in the years 1939-1945 in the Sejm library.
- 'Report on Poland's losses and war damage in 1939-1945' in three language versions: Polish, German and English (in PDF format) on the Mularczyk's website.
