= Julian Stryjkowski =

Polish journalist

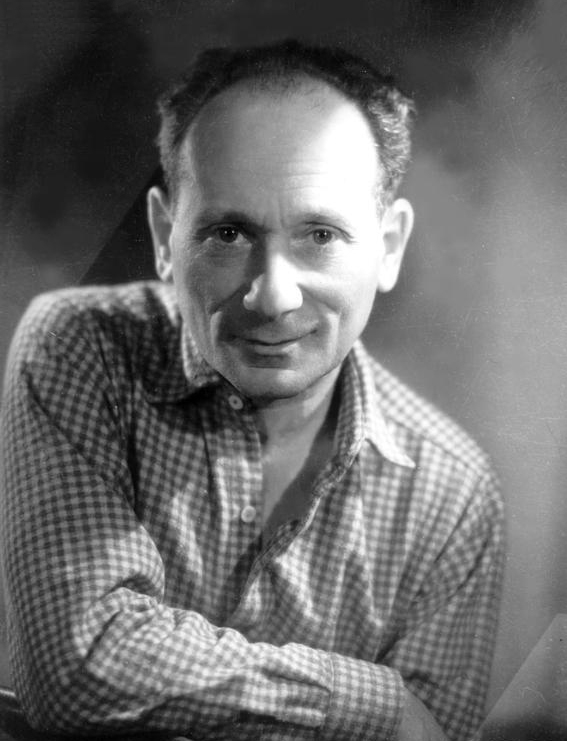
- Born: Pesach Stark; 27 April 1905; Stryi, Congress Poland
- Died: 8 August 1996 (aged 91); Warsaw, Poland
- Education: University of Lviv
- Awards: Order of Polonia Restituta, Medal of the 10th Anniversary of People's Poland

Julian Stryjkowski (born Pesach Stark; April 27, 1905 – August 8, 1996) was a Polish journalist and writer, known for his social prose and radical leftist leanings. He was considered one of the best Polish-Jewish writers of the communist era.

Stryjkowski was born April 27, 1905, in Stryj (Austrian partition, modern Ukraine), to a family of Hasidic Jews. He graduated from the Faculty of Polish Studies and Literature of Jan Kazimierz University in Lwów and in 1932 started working as a teacher of the Polish language in a gymnasium in Płock in central Poland. Initially a Zionist, in 1934 he joined the outlawed Communist Party of Western Ukraine and began teaching his own pupils Communist ideology, for which he was arrested and imprisoned in 1935. Upon his release the following year he moved to Warsaw, where he started working as a journalist for various newspapers, and as a library clerk. About that time he also began working on the Polish translation of Céline's Death on the Installment Plan.

== World War II ==
After the 1939 invasion of Poland, Stryjkowski escaped from Warsaw to Soviet-occupied Lwów (modern Lviv, Ukraine), where he was one of the journalists of Czerwony Sztandar, a Polish language propaganda newspaper published by the Soviets, and the only newspaper available to the city's inhabitants besides Pravda. After the end outbreak of Operation Barbarossa, through Tarnopol, Kiev and Stalingrad he escaped to Kuybyshev, where he tried to join the Polish II Corps. Unsuccessful, he moved to Uzbekistan, where he started working in a factory. On the insistence of Wanda Wasilewska, he was allowed by the Soviet authorities to come to Moscow, where he began working for the weekly Wolna Polska, the organ of Society of Polish Patriots, a communist and the Soviet-backed shadow government of Poland. There he adopted the pen name of Julian Stryjkowski, which became his official surname after World War II.

He returned to Poland in 1946 and became the head of the Katowice branch of the Polish Press Agency. Between 1949 and 1952, he headed that agency's bureau in Rome. However, he was deported from Italy after having published a strongly anti-capitalist novel about the fate of Italian landless peasants. Upon his return to Poland he started working as the head of prose division of Twórczość, a weekly devoted to modern literature. He held that post until his retirement in 1978. Initially strongly devoted to Communism, in 1966 he quit the Polish United Workers' Party in protest against the Communists' suppression of art, science and culture, along with other notable Polish writers of the time. Following this, he had to wait until 1978 before the censorship allowed his novels to appear in print again. He died on August 8, 1996, in Warsaw.

== Personal life ==
Stryjkowski was gay, and came out at the age of 88.
