= Krystyna Boglar =

Polish writer and screenwriter (1931–2019)

- Born: 17 December 1931; Kraków, Poland
- Died: 14 November 2019 (aged 87)
- Citizenship: Polish

Krystyna Boglar (17 December 1931 – 14 November 2019) was a Polish writer and screenwriter known mostly for her work for children and young adults. She wrote the script for the Gucio i Cezar comic book series illustrated by Bohdan Butenko which was adapted to the stage and TV.

== Life ==
Krystyna Boglar was born on 17 December 1931, in Kraków. In 1956, she graduated in Arabic from the Jagiellonian University, then worked at the Jagiellonian Library (1957–1960), before moving to Hungary for a couple of years to work in animated film production, collaborating, among others, with the Hungarofilm company. After returning to Poland in 1965, she worked at the Ministry of Culture, then for the Nasza Księgarnia publishing house. She also worked for the Polish branch of the International Board on Books for Young People. Boglar died on 14 November 2019. She is interred in Oświęcim.

== Career ==
Boglar wrote several dozen books for children and young adults. She debuted in 1966, writing for children's and young adults' magazines. In the late 1960s she started writing scripts for a comic book series Gucio i Cezar, which was illustrated by Bohdan Butenko. The series was adapted to the stage and TV as an animated series (1976–1977) for which Boglar wrote the script. In 2011, Poczta Polska released post stamps showcasing the main characters of the comic book.

Together with director Janusz Łęski, Boglar cowrote a script for a TV series based on two of her novels: Nie głaskać kota pod włos and Każdy pies ma dwa końce. Apart from writing for younger audiences, she also wrote novels for adults, such as Uśmiech czarnej wdowy or Tango na bananowej skórce. In 1981, she received the Prime Minister of Poland's award.

The English translation of her children's novel Clementine Loves Red created by Zosia Krasodomska-Jones and Antonia Lloyd-Jones was shortlisted for the 2017 Warwick Prize for Women in Translation.
