= Gazetka Miki =

Polish Disney comics magazine

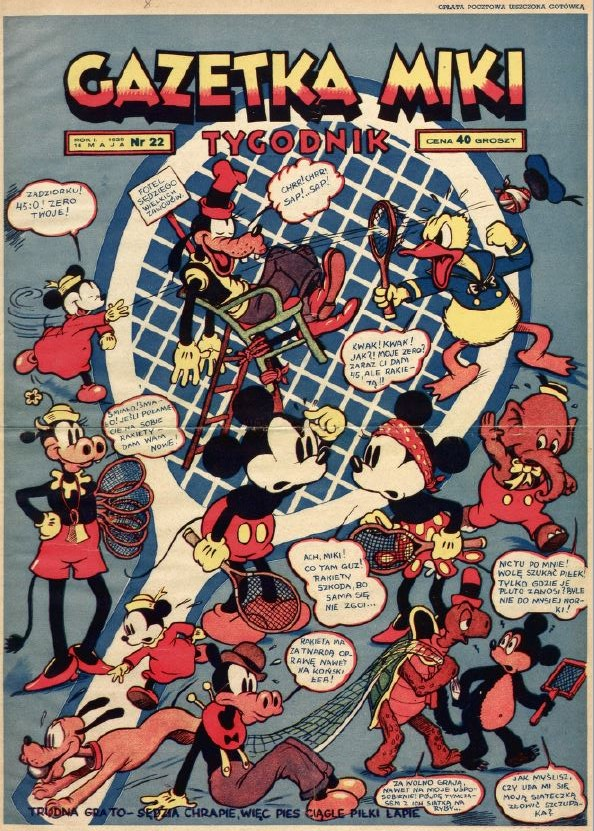
- Cover of the final issue of Gazetka Miki

Publication information
- Publisher: Marek Przeworski
- Schedule: Weekly
- Format: Ongoing series
- Genre: Action/adventure, humor/comedy
- Publication date: December 1938 – May 1939
- No. of issues: 22
- Main characters: Miki; Kaczorek Zadziorek; Hipolit Warkot

Creative team
- Artist: Wilfred Haughton (reprints)
- Editors: Janina Broniewska; Wanda Wasilewska

Gazetka Miki (transl. Mickey's Little Paper) was a short lived weekly children's comic first published in 1938 in inter-war Poland. The publication was the first Mickey Mouse comic produced in Poland.

== Publication history ==
Having first published books containing Walt Disney characters in the mid-1930s, the Warsaw publisher Marek Przeworski conceived of the idea for a new children's comic that would combine high-brow literary elements of magazines produced by respectable publishing houses with, what were often considered to be, less respectable publications. For his new publication Przeworski recruited the illustrator Jan Marcin Szancer, and the children's author Janina Broniewska and novelist Wanda Wasilewska as editors. However, due to their well known left-leaning political persuasions, including links to the Polish Socialist Party, Communist Party of Poland, and International Red Aid, and the Jewish heritage of those involved with the new publication, Aleksandra Bończa-Waśniewska (Broniewska's sister-in-law) was cited as the comic's editor in order to avoid the contemporary Żydokomuna trope. Regular contributors to the comic would also use pseudonyms to avoid censorship by the authorities.

The publication's readership was largely in the 6-12 age bracket, having a wide reach across Poland. However, Gazetka Miki failed to gain enough subscribers and began to make losses leading to its cessation after just 22 issues. The high price of the comic compared to other publications featuring comics was the main contributor to the failure of Gazetka Miki to make a profit, but other editorial decisions likely contributed. For instance, only two comic strips ran the entire 22 editions of Gazetka Miki, while others such as Snow White featured in single issues having been printed in its entitreity in a supplement to Kurier Warszawski. The comic's editors aimed to bridge the ethnic and political divides in Poland at the time, the success of which has been judged positively since.

== Content ==
The comic reproduced the Walt Disney comics characters Mickey Mouse, Donald Duck, and Goofy who were renamed Miki, Kaczorek Zadziorek, and Hipolit Warkot respectively. Other Disney characters featured in the comic included Pluto, and Snow White and the Seven Dwarves, alongside works by E. C. Segar and various other cartoonists. Five of the publication's eight pages were taken up with such cartoons while the remaining content was high-brow literature and readers letters.

Gazetka Miki reproduced extracts from The Adventures of Sajo and Her Beaver People by Grey Owl alongside original work by Polish authors. Polish contributors to the publication included poets Jan Brzechwa, Wanda Grodzieńska and Julian Tuwim, writer Zofia Kossak-Szczucka, journalist Janusz Meissner, author Gustaw Morcinek, and Zygmunt Nowakowski.

At 8 pages long Gazetka Miki was similar in format to other European Disney inspired comics of the time. It featured cover art by British artist Wilfred Haughton and has been described as drawing inspiration from Mickey Mouse Weekly.
