= Jan Marcin Szancer =

Polish illustrator (1902–1973)

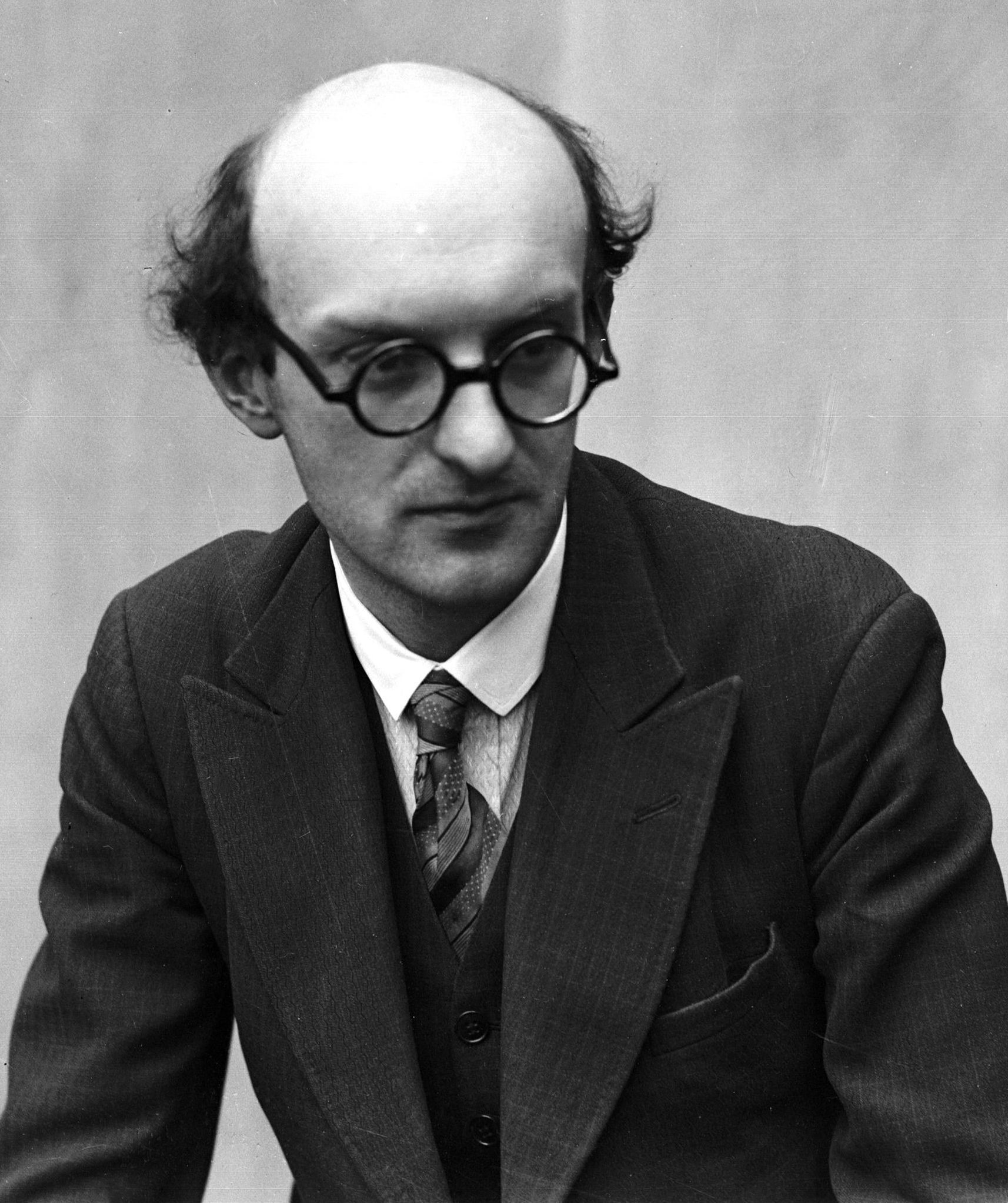
- Portrait of Szancer in 1931
- Born: 12 November 1902; Kraków
- Died: 21 March 1973 (aged 70); Warsaw
- Occupation: Illustrator
- Spouse: Zofia Sykulska-Szancerowa
- Awards: Commander's Cross Gold Cross of Merit Medal of the 10th Anniversary of People's Poland

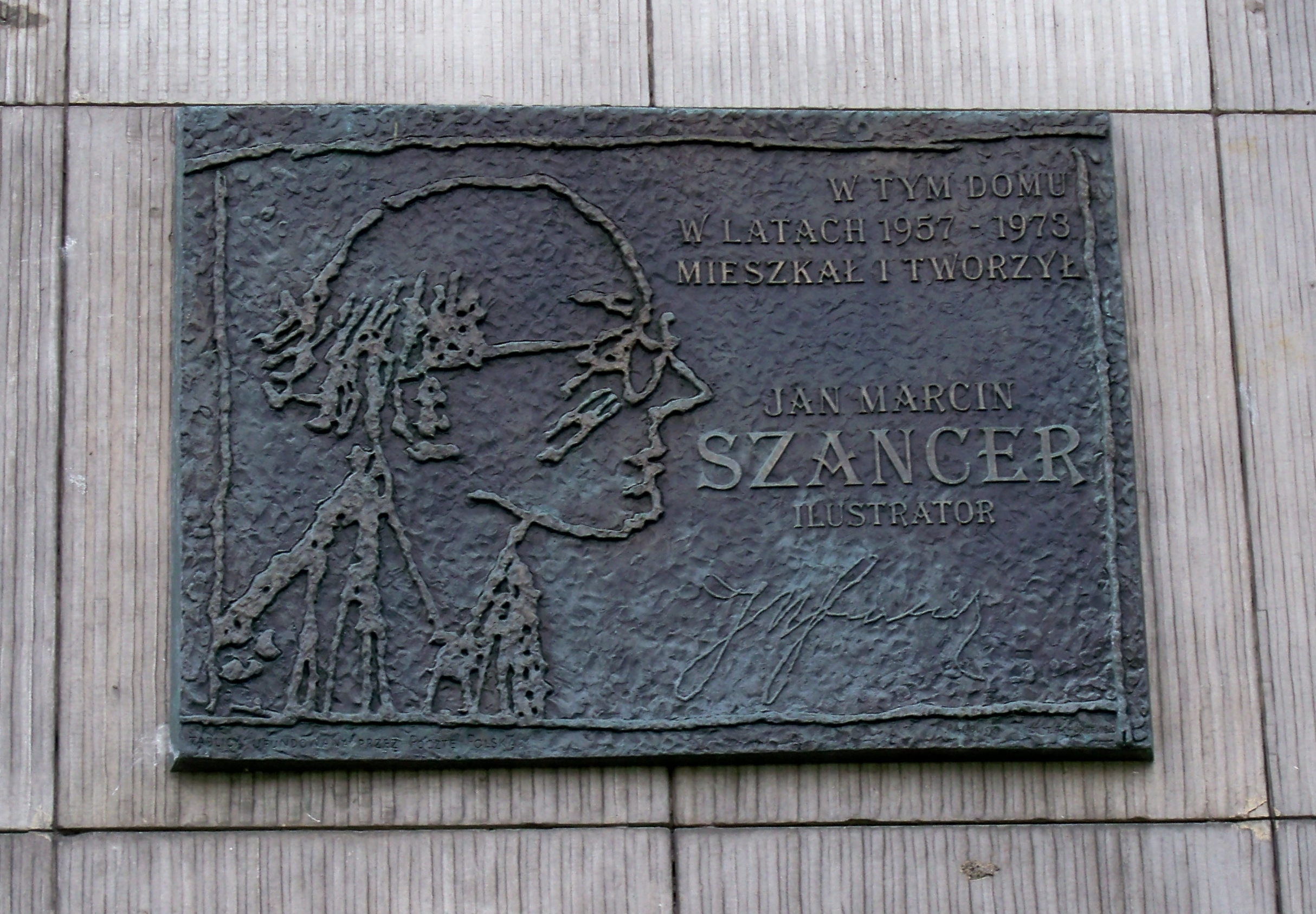
Memorial plaque for Jan Marcin Szancer on the house in Karowa Street, Warsaw, where he used to live

Jan Marcin Szancer (12 November 1902 – 21 March 1973) was a Polish illustrator, scenographer and professor at the Academy of Fine Arts in Warsaw.

Szancer was born into a Jewish family in Kraków. He studied at the Kraków Academy of Fine Arts, and later in France and Italy.

He was a friend of Jan Brzechwa, many of whose poems he illustrated.

Szancer illustrated over 200 books, including Henryk Sienkiewicz's Trilogy, Adam Mickiewicz's Pan Tadeusz and Brzechwa's Pan Kleks series. In 1938 he became the illustrator of the short-lived children's weekly Gazetka Miki. Beginning in May 1945, Szancer was the editor and cover-illustrator of the children's magazine Świerszczyk. He was the first (post World War II) artistic director for Telewizja Polska, the Polish broadcasting organization.

The Krzywy Domek in Sopot is based on one of his drawings.

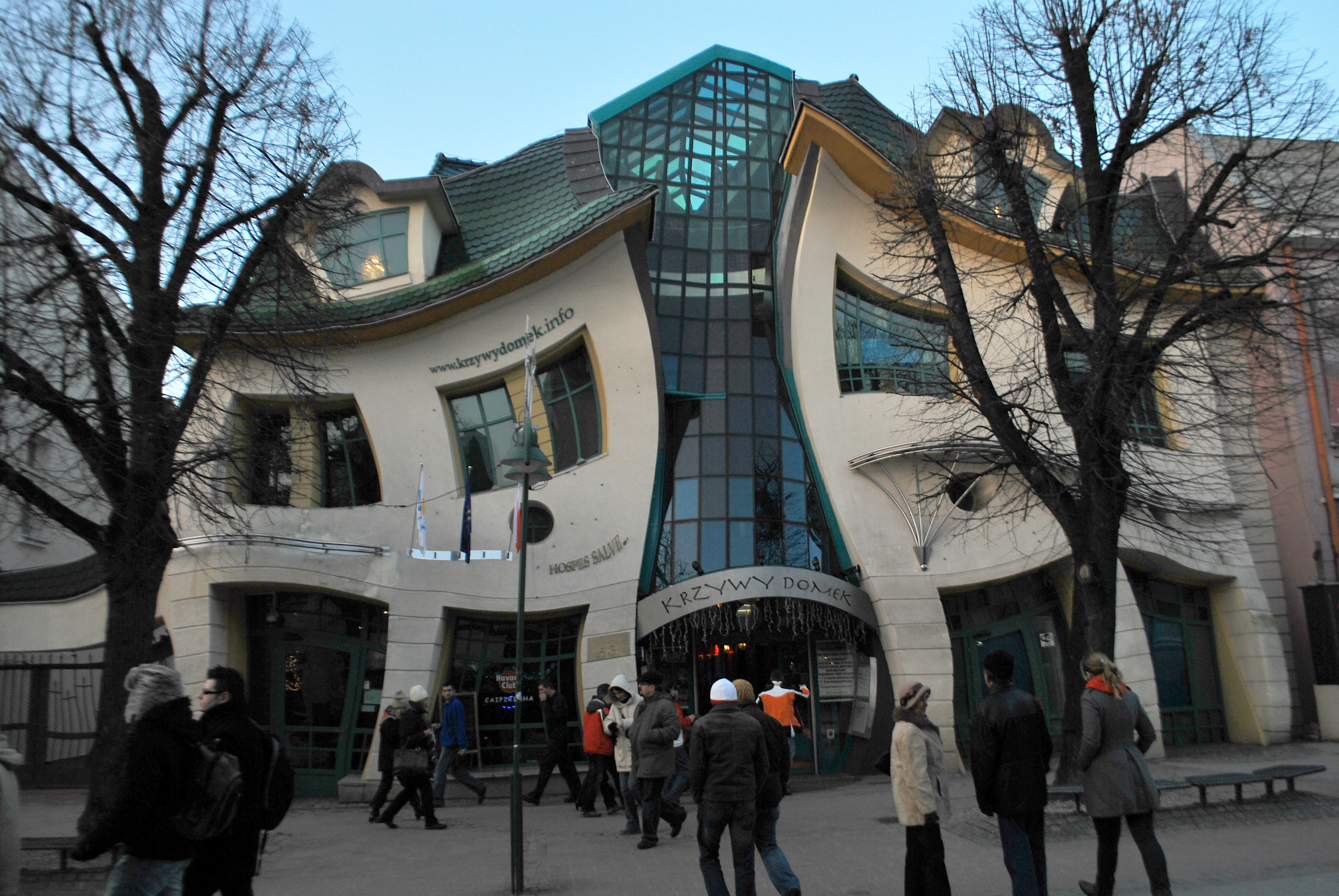
"The Crooked House of Sopot", based on one of Szancer's drawings.
