= Oblicze Dnia =

Oblicze Dnia ('The Face of the Day') was a Polish weekly literary and political newspaper published from Warsaw. The periodical was launched in and published during 1936. It was directed towards the intelligentsia and was inspired by the Popular Front victories in Spain and France. For a short period of time, the publication attracted various prominent cultural figures. Collaborators of the newspaper included Andrzej Strug, Zofia Nałkowska, Maria Dąbrowska, Romain Rolland, Louis Aragon and Paul Langevin. The editors of the newspaper belonged to the Communist Party of Poland and the left-wing tendency of the Polish Socialist Party (PPS).

Wanda Wasilewska served as the editor-in-chief, and the periodical was named after one of her novels, published in 1934. The book dealt with a worker strike in Kraków and had obtained cult status amongst Polish left intellectuals. Wasilewska was a member of the Socialist Party but was considered a close ally of the Communist Party. At the time, negotiations on forming a Popular Front were taking place between the two parties. However, the launching of Oblicze Dnia led to the breakdown of these talks, as the Socialist Party felt that the Communist Party had launched this newspaper under the supposed cover of a PPS sympathizer. The publication remained close to the Communist Party; in particular, it was associated with the communist front organ Czerwona Pomoc ("Red Aid"). As with other publications linked to the Communist Party, Oblicze Dnia was confiscated by the state authorities from time to time.
