= Polish Committee of National Liberation =

Provisional government of Poland, proclaimed in 1944

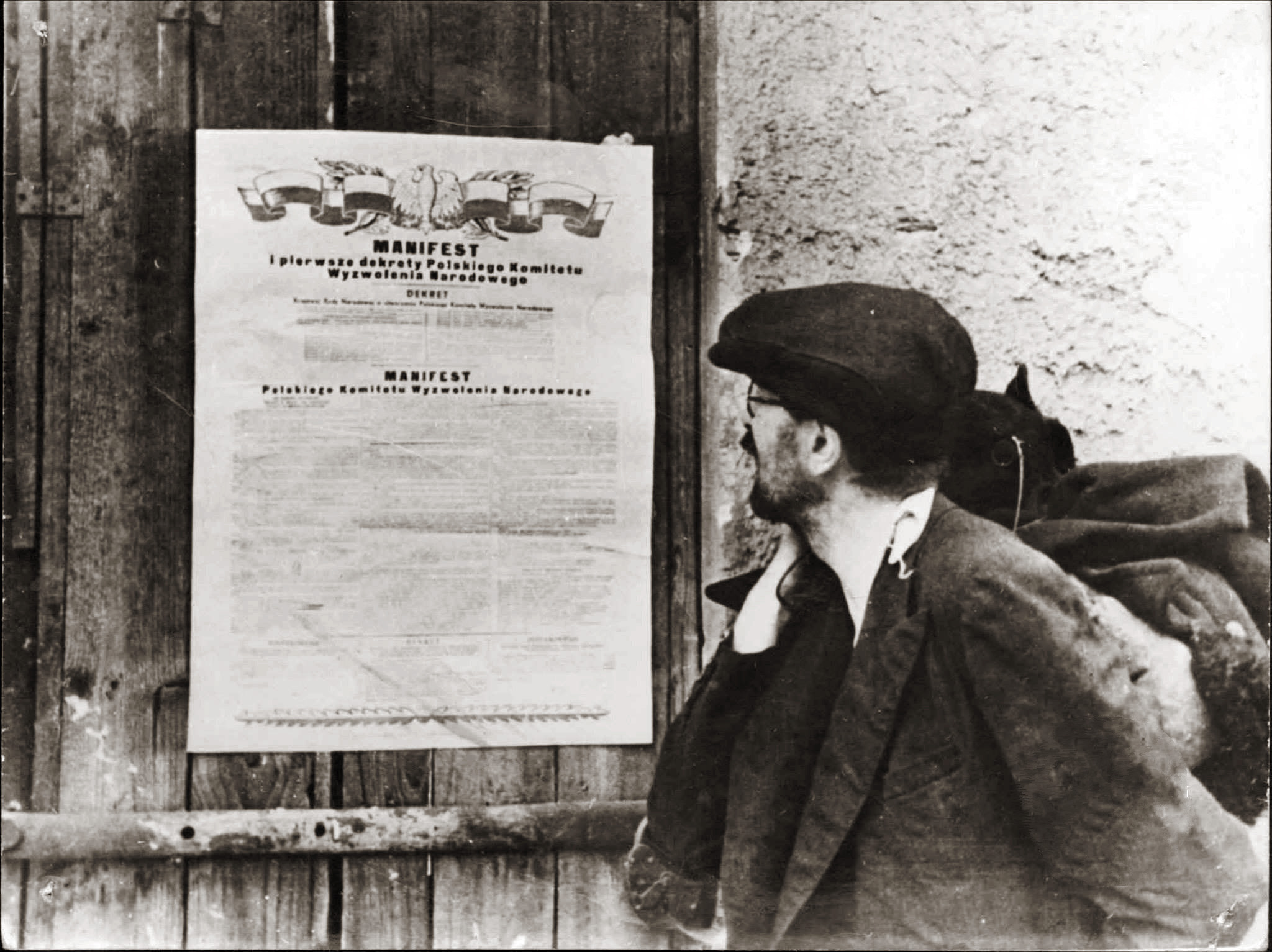
A photo of a citizen reading the PKWN Manifesto, used for propaganda purposes

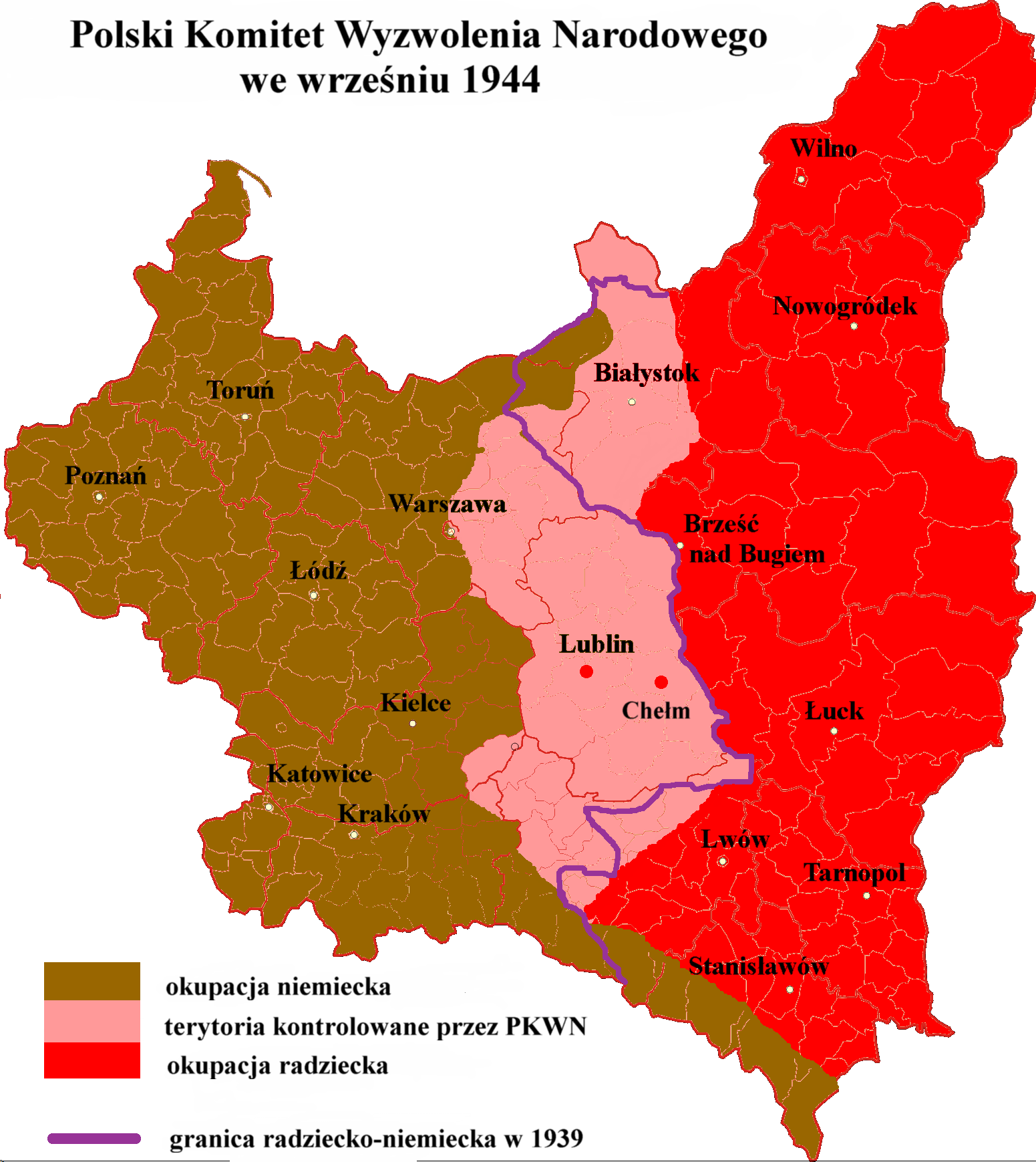
Lands administered by the PKWN in September 1944 (pink); German-occupied lands (brown) and Soviet-occupied lands (red)

The Polish Committee of National Liberation (Polish: Polski Komitet Wyzwolenia Narodowego, PKWN), also known as the Lublin Committee, was an executive governing authority established by the Soviet-backed communists in Poland at the later stage of World War II. It was officially proclaimed on 22 July 1944 in Chełm, installed on 26 July in Lublin and placed formally under the direction of the State National Council (Krajowa Rada Narodowa, KRN). The PKWN was a provisional entity functioning in opposition to the London-based Polish government-in-exile, which was recognized by the Western allies.^{[a]} The PKWN exercised control over Polish territory retaken from Nazi Germany by the Soviet Red Army and the Polish People's Army. It was sponsored and controlled by the Soviet Union and dominated by Polish communists.

== Formation ==
At the time of the formation of the PKWN, the principal Polish authority in German-occupied Poland was the Polish Underground State network of organizations loyal to the Polish government-in-exile, resident in London. As the Red Army, fighting Nazi German forces, entered Polish territory, Joseph Stalin and Polish communists proceeded with the establishment of a rival executive authority, one that they could trust.^{[b]}

The PKWN was formed in negotiations involving primarily the main Polish communist organizations, the Union of Polish Patriots (ZPP) and the Polish Workers' Party (PPR). The Polish communist movement had been decimated during the Soviet purges in the 1930s, but revived under Stalin's auspices beginning in 1940. The PPR was a new party organized in occupied Poland, the ZPP originated during the war in the Soviet Union. The PPR had already established in Warsaw a conspiratorial State National Council (KRN), which they declared to be the wartime national parliament. Because of war-related obstacles, the communist leaders arriving from Warsaw (the PPR delegation that included Władysław Gomułka and Bolesław Bierut) reached Lublin only on 31 July, and attained full agreement with the group from Moscow (ZPP) on 15 August. The documents they produced were antedated to 21 July to comply with the declarations issued as of 22 July.

The PKWN Manifesto, proclaimed on 22 July 1944, was outlined in advance in a Radio Moscow broadcast. The PKWN, located in Lublin, became known as the Lublin Committee. While the administrative authority in Poland was granted to the PKWN, many aspects of wartime governance were determined by the Soviet military surveillance.

As the Red Army and the allied Polish Army moved into Polish territory, the PKWN expanded its authority within the liberated areas, except for Kresy (prewar eastern Poland), intended by the Allies to be incorporated into the Soviet Union (see Tehran Conference, Yalta Conference).

== Membership ==
Among the members of the PKWN were politicians of various communist and leftist parties accepted by Stalin. Its chairman was Edward Osóbka-Morawski of the Polish Socialist Party (PPS). His deputies were Wanda Wasilewska and Andrzej Witos of the Union of Polish Patriots (ZPP); Witos was a younger brother of Wincenty Witos, a notable pre-war politician. Andrzej Witos was later replaced by Stanisław Janusz. The fifteen members included those from the KRN and the ZPP. Officially, three were from the Polish Socialist Workers' Party (RPPS, a left-wing PPS faction), four represented the agrarian People's Party (SL), one the Democratic Party (SD), five the Polish Workers' Party (PPR) and two were unaffiliated. Stanisław Radkiewicz was responsible for the security department and Michał Rola-Żymierski for the defense department. The Soviet side was represented by Nikolai Bulganin, whose role was to provide support for the PKWN's administration and security apparatus, and who was charged with destruction of political and military groupings representing the Polish government-in-exile. The PKWN presented itself as a broad leftist and democratic coalition, but the major Polish political parties were not officially represented. According to historian Norman Davies, most of the key positions in the PKWN were given to people who were essentially Soviet employees and not PPR members. Communists were in charge of the departments of military affairs, security, and propaganda.

== Policies ==
The PKWN Manifesto promised radical agrarian reforms, westward expansion of Polish territory at the expense of Germany, and adherence to the 1921 March Constitution of Poland. It accused the Polish government-in-exile of being a "usurper" and called the 1935 April Constitution of Poland "fascist". At the outset, Polish communists had marginal support among the Polish population and the new regime was completely dependent on Moscow. The committee's early decrees granted the Soviet secret police (the NKVD) authority over the Red Army's "rear areas" (which effectively meant all of Poland) and proclaimed the creation of a Polish Army under Soviet leadership.

The PKWN used a combination of repressive and co-optive measures. It appealed to patriotic sentiment, supported cultural events, and implemented a popular and long-overdue land reform. The newly recreated Polish army, largely staffed with Soviet officers (most of the Polish officer corps present in the east was eliminated in the Katyn massacre or left the Soviet Union with Anders' Army), kept the appearance of a national army and participated in the Soviet offensive all the way to Berlin.

At the end of December 1944, the PKWN was reconstituted as the Provisional Government of the Republic of Poland (RTRP), which was formally recognized by the Soviet Union in January 1945. The government-in-exile retained for the time being the recognition of the United States and the United Kingdom, but in reality the Western powers no longer considered it relevant as an international settlement on the issue of Poland's government was sought.

== See also ==
- Provisional Government of National Unity

== Notes ==
a. "The new Polish regime began to legislate as early as July, 1944. At that time the only existing Polish government was the Polish Government in Exile in London, which was internationally recognized".

b. "In the summer of 1944 there were therefore two rival centres claiming authority in Poland. On one side, there was the non-communist Underground State with the AK, enjoying the support of most Poles, and owing allegiance to the legitimate Polish government in London, which was still recognized by the Western Allies; and on the other, the Soviet sponsored PKWN which, despite its feeble roots among the Polish population, enjoyed the full material support of the Red Army and of the Soviet security forces in the creation of structures of government behind the Soviet front line."
