= Andrzej Witos =

Polish politician and activist

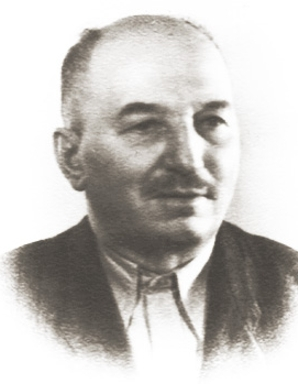
Andrzej Witos (1878-1973) – Polish politician, brother of Wincenty Witos

Andrzej Witos (born 8 November 1878 in Wierzchosławice, died 9 March 1973 in Łódź) was a Polish politician, activist and younger brother of Wincenty Witos.

== Biography ==
From 1902 he lived in Jasionów (between 1905–1907 in the United States). In 1928 in Złoczew, he ran a farm. He belonged to the Polish People's Party (PSL). In the years 1922–1927 he was a member of Polish parliament (the Sejm).

After the Soviet invasion of Poland, in 1940 he was deported to Siberia. In 1941 he was imprisoned in a labor camp as president of the Settlement Union of the Tarnopol Voivodeship. After being released as a result of the Sikorski–Mayski agreement, in 1942–1943 he was an employee of the Polish Embassy in the Soviet Union responsible for the Polish population in Azerbaijan. From May 1943, Witos was a member of the Union of Polish Patriots. In 1944 he was a member of the Polish Committee of National Liberation, where he headed the Ministry of Agriculture and Agricultural Reforms until 9 October 1944. He was also a deputy to the State National Council.

After World War II, Witos was a member of the governing council of Stanisław Mikołajczyk's Polish People's Party, and in the Polish People's Republic a Sejm deputy and member of the United People's Party.

Andrzej Witos died in 1973 and was buried in Łódź.
