= Janina Broniewska =

Polish writer

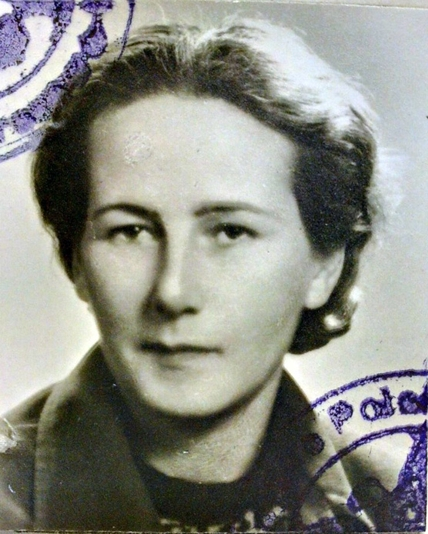
- Born: Janina Kunig; August 5, 1904; Kalisz, Congress Poland
- Died: February 17, 1981 (aged 76); Warsaw, Poland
- Burial place: Powązki Military Cemetery
- Other names: Bronisława Janowska
- Education: Szkoły Zdobniczej przy Muzeum Rzemiosł i Sztuki Stosowanej
- Occupation: Author
- Organization(s): Polish Writers' Union, Society of Fighters for Freedom and Democracy
- Notable work: O człowieku, który się kulom nie kłaniał (biography of Karol Świerczewski)
- Movement: Socialist realism
- Spouse: Władysław Broniewski
- Children: Joanna Broniewska-Kozicka
- Parents: Hugo Oskar Kunig (father); Jadwiga Gejer (mother)
- Awards: Order of the Banner of Labor (1st class) Commander's Cross with Star Commander's Cross Gold Cross of Merit Medal of Victory and Freedom 1945 Medal Komisji Edukacji Narodowej Medal of Merit for National Defence

Janina Broniewska née Kunig (5 August 1904 – 17 February 1981) was a Polish writer, author of many stories for children and young adults, a publicist and teacher. She subscribed to radically leftist views and became a communist activist, writer and official.

Broniewska was born in Kalisz. Between 1934 and 1937, she was the editor of the magazine Płomyk ('Flame') for children, after which she became the editor of the short lived Gazetka Miki for which she wrote under the pen name Bronisława Janowska. Following the Soviet invasion of Poland, she collaborated with Sztandar Wolności ('The Banner of Freedom'), a newspaper published in Minsk. Between 1944 and 1946, she worked as editor for Polska Zbrojna ('Armed Poland') magazine published at that time for the Polish People's Army. Politically influential in the Polish People's Republic, Broniewska was secretary of the Polish United Workers' Party organization of the Polish Writers' Union. She was the first wife of the poet Władysław Broniewski and a close friend of Wanda Wasilewska.

Broniewska died in Warsaw at the age of 76.

== Books ==
- O człowieku, który się kulom nie kłaniał (1948, published by Książka in Warsaw)
- Dziesięć serc czerwiennych (1966)
- Tamten brzeg mych lat (1973)
- Z notatnika korespondenta wojennego (1981)
