= Słup, Gostynin County =

Słup
- Village
- Location within Poland
- Coordinates: 52°19′23″N 19°39′42″E
- Country: Poland
- Voivodeship: Masovian
- County: Gostynin
- Gmina: Szczawin Kościelny

Słup [swup] is a village in the administrative district of Gmina Szczawin Kościelny, within Gostynin County, Masovian Voivodeship, in east-central Poland.
