= Jerzy Putrament =

Polish writer and politician (1910–1986)

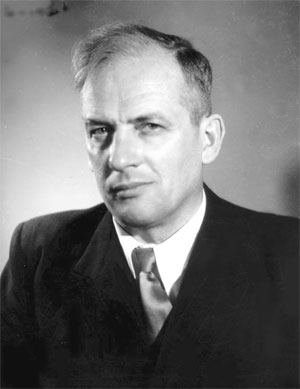
Jerzy Putrament

Jerzy Putrament (14 November 1910 – 23 June 1986) was a Polish writer, poet, editor, publicist and politician.

== Biography ==
Jerzy Putrament was born in Minsk into a family with patriotic traditions. His mother was of Russian origin and adhered to Eastern Orthodox Church, as did Jerzy.

In his youth he was a member of the poetic circle Żagary (Firestorm). His story is told, as the character " Gamma, slave of history", in a chapter of Czesław Miłosz's book The Captive Mind.

In the Second Polish Republic, where he studied at the Stefan Batory University in Wilno, he at first leaned towards the right-wing endecja faction, and became a member of the Camp of Great Poland; later he supported the Communist Party of Poland, for which he was arrested and put on trial. After the Soviet invasion of Poland, he remained in the territories annexed by the Soviet Union and worked as a communist functionary, living in Lviv. At the same time, his mother and sister were deported to Siberia. Having fled to Moscow after the German invasion of the Soviet Union in 1941, he became one of the founders of the Union of Polish Patriots and a war correspondent and a political commissar in the Polish Army in the East. At that time he wrote much pro-Soviet propaganda.

In the People's Republic of Poland, he became a writer, publishing many works supporting the ideals of communism, and a politician. He became an editor of two literary journals (Miesięcznik Literacki from 1966 to 1971 and Literatura from 1955 to 1968), and as such he had significant influence on Polish cultural policy. He was Ambassador to Switzerland from 1945 to 1947, Ambassador to France from 1947 to 1950, a deputy to the Polish Parliament from 1952 to 1961, and eventually a member of the Central Committee of the Polish United Workers' Party from 1964 to 1981.

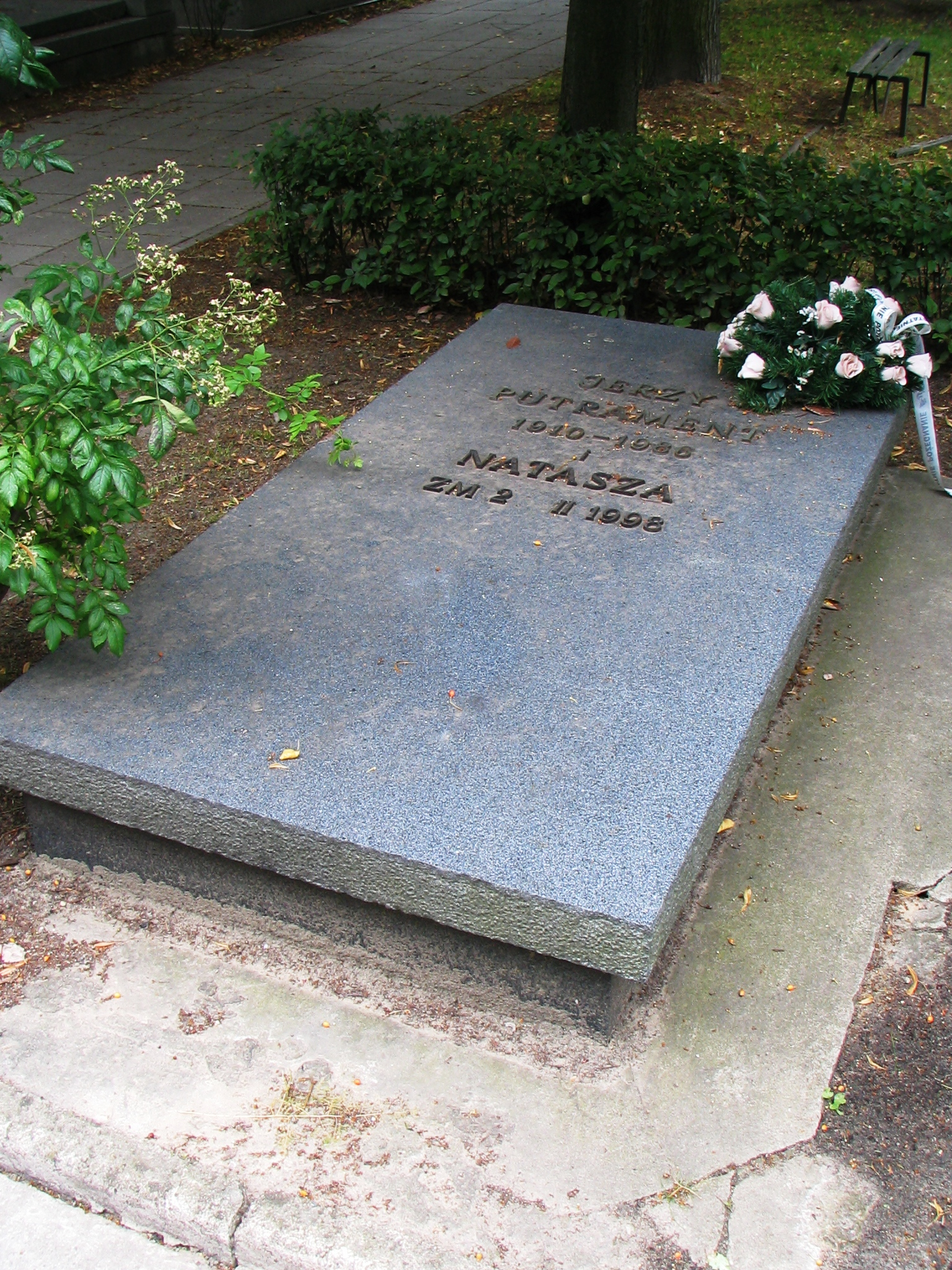
Grave, Warsaw

He was a president of the Polish Chess Federation from 1954 to 1957 and 1963 to 1973. He died in Warsaw in 1986.

== Works ==
Altogether Putrament wrote some 50 fictional works.

He published his first works (poetry) before the war; his poetry anthologies Wczoraj powrót ("Yesterday the Return", 1935) and Droga leśna, ("Forest Road", 1938) were well received. Their main themes were revolutionary politics and beauty of the countryside.

His first novel was Rzeczywistość (1947; "Reality") which draws on his experiences of the trial for communist activism in Poland before the war. His most renowned writings include the political novels Rozstaje (1954; "At the Crossroads") and Małowierni (1967; "Those of Little Faith") and the wartime novel Bołdyn (1969). Bołdyń was filmed in 1982 by Czesław and Ewa Petelska.

== List of works ==
=== Poetry ===
- 1934 – Wczoraj powrót (Yesterday back)
- 1937 – Droga leśna (Forest road)
- 1944 – Wojna i wiosna (War and spring)
- 1951 – Wiersze wybrane (Anthology)

=== Prose ===
- 1936 – Struktura nowel Prusa (The structure of novels)
- 1946 – Święta kulo (Holy ball)
- 1947 – Rzeczywistość (Reality)
- 1952 – Wrzesień (September)
- 1952 – Notatnik chiński (Chinese notebook)
- 1953 – Od Wołgi do Wisły (From the Volga to the Vistula)
- 1954 – Rozstaje (Crossroads)
- 1955 – Trzy powroty (Three returns)
- 1956 – Notatki polemiczne (Polemic notes)
- 1956 – Dwa łyki Ameryki (Two sips of America)
- 1956 – Wakacje (Holiday)
- 1957 – Wypadek w Krasnymstawie (An accident in Krasnystaw)
- 1957 – Trzynasty z Wesołka (The thirteenth of Wesołek)
- 1958 – Strachy w Biesalu (Fears in Biesal)
- 1959 – Kronika obyczajów (Chronicle of customs)
- 1959 – Fiołki w Neapolu (Violets in Napels)
- 1961 – Arka Noego (Noah's ark)
- 1961 – Arkadia (Arcadia)
- 1961 – Chińszczyzna (Chinese food)
- 1961 – Pół wieku, t. I (Half a century)
- 1961 – Pół wieku, t. II (Half a century)
- 1963 – Cztery strony świata (Four sides of the world)
- 1963 – Pasierbowie (Stepchildren)
- 1964 – Odyniec (Odin)
- 1966 – Puszcza (Wilderness)
- 1967 – Małowierni (The infidels)
- 1969 – Bołdyn (Bołdyn)
