= Katowice Forum =

The Katowice Forum (Polish: Katowickie Forum (Partyjne)) was a group of hardline Polish United Workers' Party members affiliated with the PUWP Voivoidship committee in Katowice, that during the 1980-1981 political crisis advocated pro-Soviet views. On May 28, 1981 the forum published an attack on Kania's policies, warning of the “effects of Trotskyite-Zionism, nationalism, clericalism and anti-Sovietism”. TASS reported positively on the article. The de facto leader of the Forum was Wsiewołod Wołczew.
