= Communism in Poland =

Communism in Poland can trace its origins to the late 19th century: the Marxist First Proletariat party was founded in 1882. Rosa Luxemburg (1871–1919) of the Social Democracy of the Kingdom of Poland and Lithuania (Socjaldemokracja Królestwa Polskiego i Litwy, SDKPiL) party and the publicist Stanisław Brzozowski (1878–1911) were important early Polish Marxists.

During the interwar period in the Second Polish Republic, some socialists formed the Communist Party of Poland (Komunistyczna Partia Polski, KPP). Most of the KPP's leaders and activists perished in the Soviet Union during Joseph Stalin's Great Purge in the 1930s, and the party was abolished by the Communist International (Comintern) in 1938.

== Second World War (1939-1945) ==
In 1939, World War II began and Poland was conquered by Nazi Germany and the Soviet Union. The government of the Polish Republic went into exile. In 1942, Polish communists backed by the Soviet Union in German-occupied Poland established a new Polish communist party, the Polish Workers' Party (Polska Partia Robotnicza, PPR). Władysław Gomułka soon became its leader. In the Soviet Union, Stalin and Wanda Wasilewska created the Union of Polish Patriots as a communist organization under Soviet control. As Germany was being defeated, the Polish communist minority collaborated with the Soviet Union, in opposition to the legitimate Polish government-in-exile, to establish a Polish socialist state, albeit subordinate to the Soviet Union. This led to the creation of the Polish People's Republic. The Polish Workers' Party merged with the Polish Socialist Party (Polska Partia Socjalistyczna, PPS), to form the Polish United Workers' Party (Polska Zjednoczona Partia Robotnicza, PZPR), which ruled Poland until 1989. In post-World War II Poland, the communists initially enjoyed popular support due to the land reform, a mass scale rebuilding program, and progressive social policies. The popular support eventually eroded because of repressions, economic difficulties, and lack of freedoms, however the PZPR was kept in power for four decades under Soviet influence.

== Stalinist Period (1945-1953) ==
Towards the end of World War II, with the approval of the United States and the UK, the PPR (under the command of the USSR) started its program of Polonization following the changes of the Polish borders; it was decided that Poland would cede the Eastern Borderlands to the Soviet Union in exchange for the Recovered Territories (formerly German lands) in the west. By the time Władysław Gomułka was appointed General-Secretary of the PPR, the regime had begun cementing its tenuous power by exuding an ethno-nationalist ethos to unite a homogenizing Poland against threats to the country, i.e. minorities such as Germans. This was accomplished by the expulsion of such minorities to neighboring countries, such as Belarus.

Much of this came about through the support of the Catholic Church. The then-Primate of Poland August Hlond actively worked to push Germans out of positions within the church and the newly acquired land in tandem with the Party, while simultaneously asserted the church's autonomy by holding a Mass in 1945 which attracted up to four million people. This assertion of independence allowed the Church to establish its own institutions such as schools, as well as enabling it to undermine the state by supporting anti-PPR organizations. After the 1947 Polish parliamentary election, the PPR felt secure enough to begin targeting its only major rival for control within the country, by imprisoning eighty-one priests in 1948 and seizing church properties two years later.

== Post-Stalin (1953-1956) ==
Poland was one of the first Warsaw Pact countries to abandon the totalitarianism of Stalin's regime, in part due to the stronger nationalist ideas present within it. Krushchev emphasized the continued role of communism - but in a new, revitalized form - whereas Gomułka government established their position as being one serving the interests of Poland.

With Krushchev now serving as leader of the USSR, having delivered his secret speech in 1956, anti-Stalinist ideas began to spread as resentment boiled over into the first of several protests in Poznań at the Stalin Factory (ZiSPO). Its workers and many residents of the city all marched towards the city center on June 28 in expression of their many grievances such as wage cuts, demanding to meet with party leaders - leaders who did not show up. Further incensing the crowd, they stormed the prison and seized its weapons as well as freeing many inmates before descending upon the radio station. The Politburo approved action by Marshal Rokossovsky to send 10,000 troops in to quell the revolt, resulting in 73 deaths as order was restored to the city. Unrest still lingered within a population desperate for reform, leading the PZPR to elevate Gomułka as the new leader to assuage the population..

== Władysław Gomułka (1956-1970) ==
The Poznań protest wasn't the only incident in the mid to late 1950s. On October 2nd 1957, the PZPR censored Po Prostu (Plain Talk), the student's magazine at Warsaw Polytechnical University. The PZPR shut the magazine down because it symbolized press freedom. Two days later on the 4th, the situation worsened. Unhappy young people, mostly students, planned to have a protest meeting there. They were not happy about the current situation in Poland as most of them did not believe in their politicians. To their surprise they were not allowed into the school. Outside many people continued to protest, almost all peacefully. Armed forces who had batons and tear gas in their arsenal started attacking the unarmed peaceful protesters. The forces included normal officers of the law and ZOMO (Zmotoryzowane Odwody Milicji Obywatelskiej / Motorized Reserves of the Citizens’ Militia) battalions whose purpose was ‘riot control’. Throughout the 5 day span many young people were attacked and targeted by ZOMO across the entirety of Poland, especially in cities. These young people started to fight back and led to many more arrests and injuries of officers.

The PZPR finished its strikes on October 7th subsequently bringing the Polish October Thaw to an end around the one year anniversary of Gomułka’s first year in office. By late October, Gomułka had turned on the people who supported him. He lost their support and trust in the process. At a party meeting he was accused of returning to Stalinism. He said there are only two choices: for or against socialism. Gomułka opposed Stalinism because it saw Poland sovereignty as a threat which opposed his nationalistic views.

During this period, some Polish academics and philosophers, including Leszek Kołakowski, Tadeusz Kotarbiński, Kazimierz Ajdukiewicz, and Stanisław Ossowski, tried to develop a form of "Polish Marxism", as part of the revisionist Marxist movement. These efforts to create a bridge between Poland's history and Marxist ideology were mildly successful, especially in comparison to similar attempts elsewhere in the Eastern Bloc. But they were stifled by the regime's unwillingness to risk stepping too far in the reformist direction.

== Pope John Paul II and Solidarity (1979-1989) ==
On June 2nd 1979, then Pope John Paul II began his pilgrimage to his native country of Poland seeking to reinvigorate faith in the country after decades of encouraged atheism by the Soviet government. Beginning in Warsaw, John Paul II made frequent connections to Polish identity and the Catholic faith which had been intertwined for essentially all of the country's history, reminding Poles that they were, at their core, a very spiritual people. The Solidarity protests at the Lenin Shipyard in Gdansk reflected this with religious imagery prevalent throughout, such as pictures of the pope on display. John Paul II's pilgrimage led to a revitalization of religious and nationalist fervor within the country, two aspects which formed the backbone of Solidarity.

On August 7th 1980 crane operator Anna Walentynowicz was fired for supporting trade unions which, aside from the party-approved ones, were illegal. Lech Wałęsa incited a strike amongst Walentynowicz's coworkers in response one week later, and presented their manifesto "Twenty-one Demands" on August 17th 1980. While mostly focusing on the rights of trade unions and their members, it also included demands for the recognition of the right to free speech and other reforms for liberalization, forming the roots for what would become the Solidarity movement. Though it signed the Gdansk Agreement with the PZPR, legalizing its status as an independent trade union, and reached 10 million members by 1981, the government imposed martial law that same year on December 12th in an attempt to crush the rapidly growing anti-communist movement. The following year saw several thousand civilians arrested including Wałęsa himself as crackdowns seemed to push Solidarity further underground, but when John Paul II made another visit to Poland in 1983, whose presence fueled another wave of fervor for the distinctly Catholic union, martial law was lifted in July as Wałęsa earned the Nobel Peace Prize in October.

Gorbachev became the new General Secretary of the USSR in 1985. He introduced his reforms of glasnost and perestroika, encouraging reform within the Warsaw Pact, especially Poland. A new generation of young people who had not borne witness to the brutal crackdown on Solidarity was also coming of age but still held much anti-communist sentiment, as exemplified by the Freedom and Peace Movement (WiP): a pacifist movement born from student organizers in 1980 who opposed the nuclear arms race and championed human rights, independence and self-determination. It was students like these who helped revive Solidarity, and by 1988 the PZPR was willing to compromise with its leadership with Wałęsa by entering discussions rather than utilizing the armed forces in order to stop the strikes. This would eventually result in the Round Table talks in February 1989, where after two months a compromise was hammered out, re-legalizing Solidarity, creating a new free senate, and opening 35% of the seats in the Sejm to outside parties. On the day of the elections on June 4, Solidarity won almost every single senate seat available. Realizing how much power this new opposition had, another compromise was formed where the PZPR would provide a president, General Jaruzelski, and Solidarity would provide the prime minister, Tadeusz Mazowiecki, as an agreement which the Kremlin would agree to. By the next year when presidential elections were held however, Jaruzelski was soundly defeated by Wałęsa, establishing Poland's first non-communist government in roughly 45 years. This landmark event would lead to the subsequent removal of the regimes in the other Warsaw Pact countries, eventually culminating in the dissolution of the USSR and Gorbachev's resignation in 1991.

== Third Polish Republic ==
In post-1989 democratic Poland, declared communists have had a minimal impact on the political and economical life of the country and are ostracized. However, former communists, including members of the Politburo of the PZPR, remained active on the political scene after the transition to liberal democracy. Some were democratically elected to top national leadership positions (e.g. Aleksander Kwaśniewski, who was a two-term president of the Polish Republic). Their center-left party, the Democratic Left Alliance (Sojusz Lewicy Demokratycznej, SLD), was one of the major political parties in Poland and was represented in the Sejm (Polish national parliament) until 2015.

== See also ==
- Solidarity (Polish trade union)
- Polish People's Republic
- Anarchism in Poland
