= Płomyczek =

Polish children's magazine

Płomyczek ('Little flame') is a Polish children's magazine established in 1917. It was created to accompany Płomyk, a magazine for older children and teens (defunct since 1991). Płomyczek is published in Warsaw.
