= Union of Polish Patriots =

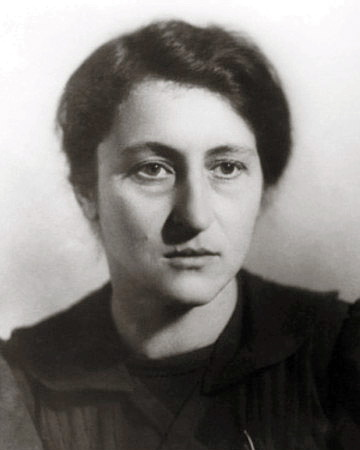
Wanda Wasilewska, founder of the Union of Polish Patriots

Union of Polish Patriots (Society of Polish Patriots, Polish: Związek Patriotów Polskich, ZPP, Russian: Союз Польских Патриотов, СПП) was a political body created by Polish communists in the Soviet Union in 1943. The ZPP, unofficially controlled and directed by Joseph Stalin, became one of the founding structures of the Soviet-controlled communist government that after World War II took power in Poland.

The ZPP was a mass organization with about 100,000 members (Polish citizens in the Soviet Union, mostly war refugees and Soviet deportees left after the departure of Anders' Army). It was dominated by former members of the Communist Party of Poland, in particular people from the Central Bureau Communists of Poland, which was established after the ZPP and also operated in the Soviet Union. The ZPP included activists of many political orientations. During World War II, there were about 1,500 declared Polish communists in the Soviet Union.

In January 1943, Wanda Wasilewska and Alfred Lampe petitioned the Soviet authorities for creation of an all-encompassing Polish center in the Soviet Union; it would function as a "counterweight for the reactionary (Polish) émigré elements". According to Wasilewska, the name of the organization was Stalin's idea. The ZPP was organized from 1 March and its significance increased after the Soviet Union broke relations with the Polish government-in-exile in April 1943, following the discovery of the Katyn massacre.

In May 1943, Wasilewska and other future ZPP activists were involved in the creation of the Polish 1st Tadeusz Kościuszko Infantry Division, which gave rise to the Polish People's Army. It fought on the Eastern Front together with the Soviet Red Army. The Polish People's Army was placed under command of General Zygmunt Berling and later it merged with the Armia Ludowa, the communist underground force in Poland.

The ZPP was officially established by its founding congress, which deliberated in Moscow on 9–10 June 1943. It was placed under the Directorate, which consisted of President Wanda Wasilewska and four members: Stanisław Skrzeszewski, Stefan Jędrychowski, Włodzimierz Sokorski, and Zygmunt Berling. Non-communist members of the Main Council included Andrzej Witos and Bolesław Drobner. The ZPP issued a declaration condemning the Polish government-in-exile led by Władysław Sikorski, as a body whose actions were damaging the "Anglo-Russo-American bloc".

The program of the ZPP, proclaimed at its congress, stressed the importance of alliance with the Soviet Union and postulated the creation of a democratic and socially just Poland. A new agrarian system was promised. The material, cultural and educational needs of Poles in the Soviet Union were to be satisfied. The ZPP relinquished the Polish claims to the disputed eastern borderlands (Kresy) as consisting of Ukrainian, Belarusian and Lithuanian territories, thus denouncing the borders implemented at the Peace of Riga in 1921. The ZPP's main objective was the establishment of socialism in Poland; the institution laid foundations for the creation of the post-war Polish government.

The ZPP published its own weekly Wolna Polska ('The Free Poland'), edited from 1 March 1943 by Wasilewska, and the biweekly Nowe Widnokręgi ('New Horizons'), founded by her still earlier. The organization provided extensive social and social welfare services and conducted educational activities for the Polish population in the Soviet Union, with children receiving particular attention (an estimated half of the children of Polish deportees went to Polish schools). The ZPP's Social Welfare Department took over the Polish welfare activities previously conducted in the Soviet Union by the Government Delegation for Poland of the Polish government-in-exile, and to reach the widely dispersed Polish population it worked together with a Soviet agency set up for the same purpose. About 55,000 Poles were relocated from northern Siberia to the European regions of the Soviet Union. By the end of 1943, 223,000 Polish citizens were under the care of the ZPP. In late 1943, the ZPP established the Polish National Committee (Polski Komitet Narodowy, PKN), with the intention of turning it into a communist-dominated provisional government of Poland.

In 1944 the ZPP formally recognized the State National Council (Krajowa Rada Narodowa, KRN) established in Warsaw by the ZPP's rival communist institution, the Polish Workers' Party (PPR). Together with the PPR and the Soviets, the ZPP was responsible for the formation in July 1944 of the Polish Committee of National Liberation (Polski Komitet Wyzwolenia Narodowego, PKWN), a nascent communist government; it included ZPP members.

In 1944–1946 the ZPP was involved in resettling Poles from the Soviet Union into Poland.

On 30 July 1946, the State National Council dissolved the Union of Polish Patriots.
