= Płomyk =

Magazine for children published in Poland (1917–1991)

- Categories: Children's
- Frequency: Weekly
- Founder: Janina Porazińska
- First issue: 1917
- Final issue: 1991
- Company: Nasza Księgarnia
- Country: Poland
- Based in: Warsaw
- Language: Polish
- ISSN: 0137-8503
- OCLC: 647265944

Płomyk. Tygodnik ilustrowany dla dzieci i młodzieży (Flame: Illustrated Weekly for Children and Teenagers) was a Polish magazine published from 1917 to 1991.

== History ==
The periodical was founded by Janina Porazińska in 1917 and published in Warsaw. Rozalia Brzezińska became the first editor of "Płomyk" for only one year, and after she left Warsaw, it was edited by The Teachers Association of State Schools.

The Ministry of Religions and Public Enlightenment approved using Płomyk in schools; most subscriptions went to classrooms. Initially, it was on a weekly cycle, but financial constraints changed it to a biweekly publication.

The content was interesting for the target audience, featuring articles about discoveries, faraway places, countries, plants, animals, and environmental protection. It included short stories, fairy tales, poems, and education-focused articles.

The publication continued during the Second Polish Republic. During the Interwar period, the magazine also promoted the beauty of traditional Polish folk costumes. Its articles encouraged readers to decorate their clothes with folk embroidery.

The weekly was re-established in the Polish People's Republic after World War II, but it was discontinued after the fall of communism due to losses and unprofitability.

During its history, its contributors included some of the top Polish authors for children and teenagers, such as Edmund Niziurski and Zbigniew Nienacki. Płomyk debuted Hanna Ożogowska in 1932 as an author of children's literature. She later became the editor of Płomyk.

The magazine influenced children and sparked their fascination with many subjects, such as was reflected by Zbigniew Rychlicki.

== See also ==
- Płomyczek
