= Gavrilin =

Gavrilin, feminine: Gavrilina is a Russian patronymic surname derived from Russian vernalular forms Gavrila or Gavrilo of the masculine given name Gavriil (Gabriel). Notable people with the surname include:

- Andrei Gavrilin (born 1978), Kazakh ice hockey player
- Igor Gavrilin (rugby league) (born 1971), Russian rugby league footballer and rugby union coach
- Igor Gavrilin (footballer) (born 1972), Russian professional football coach and former player
- Maria Gavrilina, birth name of Maria Arbatova (born 1957), Russian and Soviet writer, politician and feminist
- Valery Gavrilin (1939–1999), Russian composer
- Yulia Gavrilina (born 2002), Russian vlogger & singer

== See also ==
- 7369 Gavrilin, an asteroid
- Gavrilov
