= Lviv Anti-Fascist Congress of Cultural Workers =

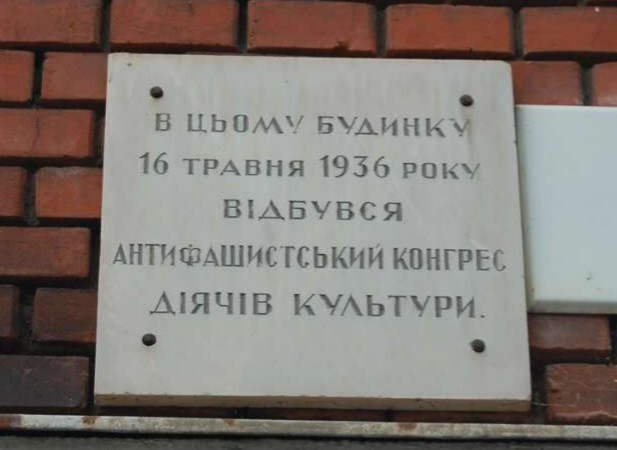
- The memorial plaque on the wall of the Hnat Khotkevych Palace of Culture dedicated to the Lviv Anti-Fascist Congress of Cultural Workers which took place in this building in 1936
- Native name: Ukrainian: Антифашистський конгрес діячів культури у Львові; Polish Antyfaszystowski Kongres Kultury Polskiej
- Date: May 16–17, 1936
- Location: Second Polish Republic, Lviv, Tramway Workers' House
- Type: cultural congress
- Theme: Anti-fascist struggle and working-class and intellectual unity
- Organised by: Communist Party of Poland; Communist Party of Western Ukraine
- Participants: Maxim Gorky, Romain Rolland, Heinrich Mann, Stefan Czarnowski, Tadeusz Kotarbiński, Wanda Wasilewska, Stepan Tudor, Yaroslav Halan, Oleksandr Havryliuk, Leon Kruczkowski, Kuzma Plekhatyi, Halina Górska, Adolf Berman, Henryk Dembiński, Tadeusz Banaś, Ada Eker, Maciej Freudman, Andrzej Gronowicz, Halina Krahelska, Marian Czuchnowski, Bronisław Dabrowski, Emil Zegadłowicz, Aleksander Dan, Tadeusz Hollender, Karol Kuryluk, Kazimierz Lewicki, Marian Promiński, Jan Brzoza

Lviv Anti-Fascist Congress of Cultural Workers was an event that brought together the progressive intellectuals of Poland, Western Ukraine, and Western Belarus. It took place on May 16-17, 1936, in Lviv, being organized by the Communist Party of Poland along with the Communist Party of Western Ukraine in order to create the united front against Fascism.

== Background ==
In Paris in 1935, the International Anti-Fascist Congress of Writers took place, led by, among others, Romain Rolland, André Gide, Andre Malraux. The meeting called for organizing local unions and meetings of intellectuals whose goal was to defend culture from fascism. The idea to organize such a Congress in Poland was the reply to that call. Besides, the Lviv Congress of 1936 was a political event implementing the recommendations of the 7th Comintern World Congress of 1935 on the organization of Popular Fronts.

Well-known intellectuals such as Stepan Tudor, Yaroslav Halan, Oleksandr Havryliuk, Leon Kruczkowski, Kuzma Plekhatyi, Halina Górska, Adolf Berman and others took part in preparing the Congress.

Lviv, as the venue of the Congress, was not chosen by chance. In the 1930s, the city became the center of Polish, Jewish and Ukrainian intellectuals, as well as the arena of class struggle.

Spring of 1936 was a hot period for the working class in Lviv. In April massive clashes between city workers and the police turned into firefights. That time could be called one of the peak moments in the left-wing movement's history in Western Ukraine. The Anti-Fascist Congress became a link of this chain of events, and set the goal to express solidarity between intellectuals and workers.

== Event ==
The event was held in the Tramway Workers' House, also known as the Red Fortress, a cultural club that was built at the expense of workers' donations and constructed by themselves in 1933.

During the meeting, the Congress Hall was decorated with a portrait of Maxim Gorky, who along with Romain Rolland and Heinrich Mann were elected to the Honorary Presidium. The Congress was opened by the Polish communist Henryk Dembiński. The writer Wanda Wasilewska read out the Resolution of the Congress of Cultural Workers.

Representatives of the striking workers and former political prisoners spoke at the congress. In breaks between sessions, the writers made speeches at the factories. According to witnesses, the workers made up the vast majority of the Congress guests. Among the participants, all main nationalities of the country - Poles, Ukrainians, Belarusians, and Jews - were represented. Some writers from the Ukrainian SSR were invited.

During the Congress, the following reports were made: Culture and Fascism (by Henryk Dembinski, Stepan Tudor), War and the Future of Culture (by Leon Kruczkowski), Culture and Conditions of Human Labour (by Halina Krahelska), On the State of Literature, Theatre, Music, Journalism, Education (by Marian Czuchnowski, Yaroslav Halan, Wanda Wasilwska, Bronisław Dabrowski, Emil Zegadłowicz, Aleksander Dan).

Speaking on the national question, the participants of the Congress expressed in favour of meeting all the cultural needs of the nationalities inhabiting the Polish state. The speakers demanded the opening of national schools, Ukrainian and Belarusian universities, and the equal rights of languages. Yaroslav Halan spoke particularly hotly about these issues.

The Congress debunked the oppressive, pro-fascist policy of the government of the Polish Republic, condemned the oppression of the working masses by the capitalists, bourgeois nationalism, chauvinism, militarism.

«... the struggle against the imperialist war, for peace, is the first primary responsibility of all progressive workers of culture»

— The Resolution of the Congress

The resolution, unanimously approved, urged the intelligentsia of Poland, Western Ukraine and Western Belarus to participate in a nationwide struggle against Nazism, to stop the preparation of a war against the USSR, for the free development of science and culture. The Congress ended with singing The Internationale.

The tone of the participants was revolutionary, some of them announced an imminent meeting «in a red Lviv».

== Consequences ==
These political accents have caused a scandal. The Association of Railway Bookstores Ruch, which had a monopoly on the distribution of the press, issued a circular forbidding the distribution of communist newspapers - Chłopskie Jutro, Język Międzynarodowy, Kultura Wschodu, Lewar, Lewy Tor, Literatur, Oblicze Dnia and Przekrój Tygodnia - previously available in normal sales.

For initiators and organizers of the Congress, it was not safe to stay in the city. Soon afterwards, its participants received a signal: «Leave Lviv». For instance, Yaroslav Halan had to move to Warsaw.

Lviv became part of the Soviet Union following the Soviet invasion of Poland in September 1939.

Years later, historians of the Communist Party of Western Ukraine regarded the Congress as a great success for their policies.

== Bibliography ==
- Kongres Kultury Polskiej 1981, red. W. Masiulanis, Warszawa 2000.
- H. Jędruszczak, H. Imbs, T. Jędruszczak, Ostatnie lata Drugiej Rzeczypospolitej (1935-1939), Książka i Wiedza 1970
- Антифашистского конгресс работников культуры во Львове в 1936 г. Документы и материалы. Львов, 1956;
- Проти фашизму та війни: Антифашистський конгрес діячів культури у Львові у 1936 р.: Збірник документів і матеріалів. Київ 1984;
- Антифашистского конгресс работников культуры во Львове в 1936 г. Библиографический указатель. Львов, 1978

== See also ==
- World Committee Against War and Fascism
- 7th World Congress of the Communist International
- Ukrainian interbrigade company Taras Shevchenko
- World Congress of Intellectuals in Defense of Peace
