= Gavrilov =

Gavrilov (Cyrillic: Гаврилов), or Gavrilova (feminine; Гаврилова) is a Russian last name, derived from the first name "Гаврила", "Гаврило" (Gavrila, Gavrilo, i.e., Gabriel). It was also transliterated in other languages as Gawrilov, Gawriloff, Gavriloff; Belarusian: Haurylau,(Гаўрылаў); Ukrainian: Havrylov/Havryliv.

Notable people with the surname include:

- Alexander Gavrilov (figure skater) (b. 1943), Soviet figure skater
- Aleksandr Gavrilov (revolutionary) (1891–1919), Russian revolutionary, Bolshevik
- Andrei Gavrilov (born 1955), a Russian pianist
- Andrey Gavrilov (born 1974), a Kazakhstani butterfly swimmer
- Andrey Gavrilov (born 1952), a Russian interpreter in film dubbing during the last decades of the 20th century
- Asen Gavrilov (1926–2006), a Bulgarian ballet dancer and choreographer
- Boris Anatolyevich Gavrilov, a Russian football coach
- Boris Petrovich Gavrilov, a Soviet rugby union player
- Daria Gavrilova, a Russian–Australian tennis player
- Dmitriy Gavrilov, a Kazakh professional basketball player
- Fyodor Gavrilov, a Russian painter of the second half of the 18th century
- Illya Hawrylaw, a Belarusian professional football player.
- Leonid Gavrilov (born 1954), a Russian-American scientist, and a founder of the reliability theory of aging and longevity
- Marina Gavrilova (born 1971), Russian-Canadian computer scientist
- Mikhail Gavrilov (1893–1954), a Russian professor and Catholic writer
- Neil Hawryliw (1955–2021), a Canadian ice hockey player
- Pyotr Mikhailovich Gavrilov (1900–1979), a Soviet army officer and Hero of the Soviet Union
- Valentin Gavrilov (1946–2003), a Soviet athlete
- Juri Gavrilov (born 1993), Estonian footballer
- Yuri Gavrilov (bandy player), Russian bandy player
- Yuri Gavrilov (footballer, born 1953), Russian football manager
- Yuri Gavrilov (footballer, born 2002), Russian football player
- Yuri Gavrilov (geologist) (born1948), Soviet and Russian geologist
- Yuri Gavrilov (handballer) (1967–2021), Ukrainian handball player
- Yuri Gavrilov (orientalist) (1932–2010), Soviet and Russian orientlist

== See also ==
- Gavrilov (crater), a lunar impact crater on the far side of the Moon
- Gavrilov translation.
- Gavrilin
