= Gavrilă =

Gavrilă is a Romanian surname and a given name. Gavrila is also the Russian vernacular form of the given name Gavriil. All of these are variants of Gabriel that may refer to:

== Surname ==
- Adelina Gavrilă (born 1978), Romanian triple jumper
- Adrian Gavrilă (born 1984), Romanian tennis player
- Bogdan Gavrilă, (born 1992), Romanian football winger
- Camelia Gavrilă (born 1961), Romanian politician
- Ion Gavrilă Ogoranu (1923–2006), paramilitarist
- Mihai Gavrilă (born 1929), Romanian physicist
- Petrus Gavrila (born 1988), Romanian sprint canoeist

== Given name ==
- Gavrila Balint
- Gavrilă Birău (1945–2025), Romanian football defender and manager
- Gavrila Derzhavin (1743–1816), Russian poet
- Gavrila Golovkin
- Gavrilă Marinescu
- Gavrila Törok (1919–20??), Romanian water polo player

== See also ==
- Gavril
- Gavriil
- Gavrilo
