= Myroslava Sopilka =

Ukrainian poet (1897–1937)

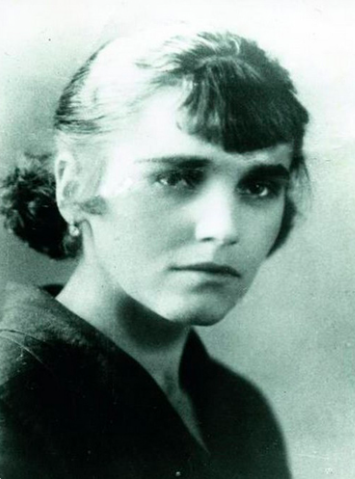
- Born: Yulia Semenivna Mysko; 29 August 1897; Vynnyky, Austria-Hungary
- Died: 28 November 1937 (aged 40); Kyiv, Ukraine
- Occupations: Poet, novelist

Myroslava Sopilka, real name Yulia Semenivna Mysko-Pastushenko (29 August 1897 – 28 November 1937), was a Ukrainian poet and novelist.

== Biography ==
Myroslava Sopilka was born in Vynnyky, Lviv oblast on 29 August 1897 as one of five children in the family of peasants.

Her works were first published in 1928 in the magazines Vikna, Syaivo, and various newspapers. At the end of 1930, she moved with her husband and two children to Soviet Ukraine, first to the city of Kamianets-Podilskyi, where she worked in the local history museum. Then (1932) Myroslava Sopilka moved to Kharkiv. She was a member of the Western Ukraine literary organization. In 1931 she published the book of poems Working Hands. She also acted as a novelist, leaving the novel The Cozy City of Superstitions.

On 12 May 1929, Myroslava Sopilka was among the founders of the literary group Gorno - with her were Vasyl Bobynskyi, Andriy Voloshchak, Oleksandr Gavrylyuk, Yaroslav Galan, Petro Kozlanyuk, Yaroslav Kondra, Nina Matulivna, and Stepan Tudor.

On 30 September 1937, Myroslava Sopilka was arrested together with her husband Mykhailo Pastushenko and accused of spying for Polish intelligence. During the interrogations, neither she nor her husband compromised themselves in anything and rejected all the accusations of the investigation. And yet, on 22 November 1937, a special meeting of The People's Commissariat for Internal Affairs of the USSR (NKVD) sentenced the poet to be shot. The sentence was executed on 28 November in Kyiv. Most likely, her body was buried at the Lukyaniv Cemetery. For a long time, nothing was known about her fate. It was officially believed that she died in exile on 18 November 1942.

Myroslava Sopilka was rehabilitated posthumously.

A street in the city of Vynnyky is named after Myroslava Sopilka.

In 1973, a collection of selected works of Myroslava Sopilka To the Sun was published.
