= Havrylov =

Havrylov or Havryliv (Ukrainian: Гаврилов, Гаврилiв), feminine: Havrylova is a Ukrainian surname, a counterpart of Russian Gavrilov. Notable people with the surname include:

- Anatoliy Havrylov (1932–2021), Ukrainian cinematographer
- Elvira Havrylova, birth name of Elvira Paterson (born 1989), Ukrainian businesswoman
- Volodymyr Havrylov, Ukrainian association football player

== See also ==
- Havryliuk
