= Pastushenko =

Pastushenko is a Ukrainian surname. Notable people with the surname include:

- Leonid Pastushenko (1936–2017), Ukrainian author, journalist, and literary critic
- Olena Pastushenko-Sinyavina (born 14 July 1979) is a retired Ukrainian sprinter
- Yulia Semenivna Mysko-Pastushenko or Myroslava Sopilka (29 August 1897 – 28 November 1937), was a Ukrainian poet and novelist
