= Gavrilović =

Gavrilović (Cyrillic script: Гавриловић) is a predominantly Serbian and to a lesser extent Croatian surname, derived from the male given name "Gavrilo" (Gabriel). It may refer to:

- Andrija Gavrilović (born 1965), Serbian-Italian basketball coach
- Bogdan Gavrilović (1864–1947), Serbian mathematician, philosopher, and educator
- Dragutin Gavrilović (1882–1945), notable Serbian and, later, Yugoslav military officer
- Goran Gavrilović (born 1963), former Serbian professional footballer
- Mihailo Gavrilović (1868–1924), prominent Serbian historian and diplomat
- Miroslav Gavrilović (1930–1920), Serbian Patriarch as Irinej I
- Sanja Gavrilović (born 1982), hammer thrower from Croatia
- Željko Gavrilović (born 1971), veteran Serbian footballer

It may also refer to:

- Gavrilović (company), the oldest Croatian meat and sausage manufacturer, founded in 1620 and based in Petrinja

== See also ==
- Gavrić
