= Gavrić =

Gavrić (Cyrillic: Гаврић) is a Serbian surname. Notable people with the name include:

- Dino Gavrić (born 1989), Croatian footballer
- Dobrosav Gavrić (born 1976), Serbian criminal
- Ivana Gavrić (born 1980 or 1981), British pianist of Bosnian origin
- Momčilo Gavrić (soldier) (1906–1993), youngest soldier in World War I
- Momčilo Gavrić (footballer) (1938–2010), Yugoslav and American footballer
- Lisa Gavrić (1907–1974), Austrian-born communist
- Nebojša Gavrić (born 1991), Serbian footballer
- Nenad Gavrić (born 1991), Serbian footballer
- Nikola Gavrić (born 1995), Croatian footballer

== See also ==
- Gavrilović
- Gavrović
