= Gavril =

Gavril is a variant of the name Gabriel, may refer to:

- Gavril Atanasov, Macedonian icon painter from Berovo in the 19th century
- Gavril Bănulescu-Bodoni (1746–1821), Romanian clergyman who served as Metropolitan of Moldavia
- Gavril Balint (born 1963), former Romanian football striker and current coach
- Gavril Dejeu (born 1932), Romanian politician and Minister of Interior
- Gavril Farkas (born 1973), Hungarian-Romanian-German mathematician
- Gavril Ilizarov (1921–1992), Russian physician, known for inventing the Ilizarov apparatus for lengthening limb bones
- Gavril Krastevich, Bulgarian politician
- Gavril Myasnikov (1889–1945), Russian metalworker from the Urals and Bolshevik underground activist
- Gavril Olteanu, leader of a Romanian paramilitary militia group part of the Maniu guards during World War II
- Gavril Radomir of Bulgaria, ruler of First Bulgarian Empire from 1014 to 1015
- Gavril Sarychev (1763–1831), Russian navigator, hydrographer, admiral and Honorable Member of the Russian Academy of Sciences
- Gavril Stefanović Venclović (1680–1749), Serbian writer, poet, orator and ilumminator
- Gavril Yushvaev (born 1957), ethnic Mountain Jew, is a Russian businessman and shareholder of Wimm-Bill-Dann

== See also ==
- Gavriil
- Gavrilo
