= The Mountains are Smoking =

1949 novel by Yaroslav Halan

- Author: Yaroslav Halan (aka Miron Jaro)
- Original title: Góry dymią
- Translators: Trofymuk, Stepan and Oksana
- Language: Polish
- Genre: Drama
- Publisher: Myśl (Lwów, in Polish)/ Radiansky Pysmennyk (Kyiv, in Ukrainian)
- Publication date: 1939/1956
- Publication place: Second Polish Republic/ UkrSSR
- Media type: Print
- Pages: 288 (first published edition)

The Mountains are Smoking (in Polish: Góry dymią) is a novel by the Polish and Ukrainian writer Yaroslav Halan written in Polish in 1938. It was published as a single book by a private Lviv publisher Myśl under the alias Miron Jaro.

The story has been written in the mountain village Nyzhniy Bereziv.

== Plot ==
The events of the story take place in the early 1920s, in a Hutsul village on the Polish-Romanian border in Pokuttia. Olga, a priest’s daughter, before her father died, makes him promise to marry his friend Martyn Pogodniak, a Polish officer of the local border outpost. However, later she falls in love with the «noble robber» Ivan Semeniuk. Over time they realize that they couldn't live without each other and decide to escape but the robber’s wife Marichka snitches on them to the officer.

== Ukrainian editions ==
- 1956, Kyiv, Radiansky Pysmennyk. Translated by Stepan Trofymuk and his wife Oksana.
- 1959, Kyiv, Dnipro Publishers. The same translation. 50,000 copies.

== Adapted Screenplay ==
- 1989, The Mountains are Smoking (in Ukrainian Гори димлять, two-part TV-movie), by the director Boris Nebieridze, Ukrtelefilm studio.

== See also ==
- Oleksa Dovbush
- Juraj Jánošík
- Robin Hood
