= Yaroslav Halan =

Ukrainian Soviet journalist and playwright (1902–1949)

- Ярослав Олександрович Галан
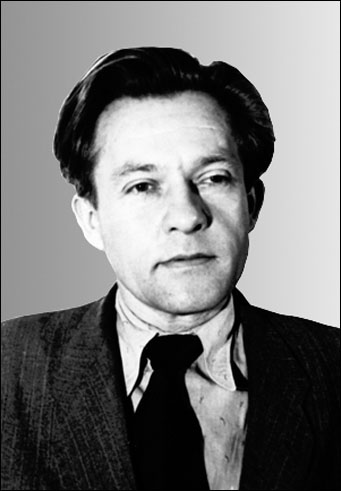
- Born: 27 July 1902; Dynów, Galicia-Lodomeria, Austria-Hungary (now Poland)
- Died: 24 October 1949 (aged 47); Lviv, Ukrainian SSR, Soviet Union (now Ukraine)
- Resting place: Lychakiv Cemetery
- Education: University of Vienna; Jagiellonian University
- Occupations: writer, playwright, publicist, politician, propagandist, radio host
- Spouses: Anna Henyk (m. 1928; died 1937) Maria Krotkova (m. 1944)
- Writing career
- Pen name: Comrade Yaga, Volodymyr Rosovych, Ihor Semeniuk
- Language: Ukrainian
- Years active: 1927–1949
- Genres: plays, pamphlets, articles
- Subject: social contradictions
- Notable works: The Mountains are Smoking (1938); Under the Golden Eagle (1947); Love at Dawn (1949)
- Notable awards: Stalin Prize; Order of the Badge of Honour
- Literary movement: socialist realism

Signature
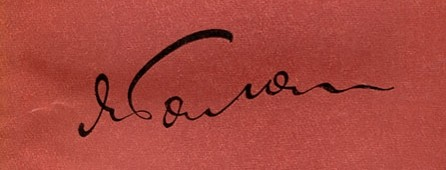

Yaroslav Oleksandrovych Halan (Ukrainian: Ярослав Олександрович Галан, party nickname Comrade Yaga; 27 July 1902 – 24 October 1949) was a Soviet Ukrainian writer, playwright, and publicist.

A member of the Communist Party of Western Ukraine from 1924, he played a role in the 1946 Synod of Lviv that merged the Ukrainian Greek Catholic Church into the Russian Orthodox Church and was controversial for the anti-Catholicism in his writings.

He was assassinated in 1949 in what the Soviet government claimed was an attack by the Ukrainian Insurgent Army, though the organisation's responsibility has since become a source of dispute.

== Early life ==
Yaroslav Oleksandrovych Halan was born on 27 July 1902 in Dynów, then part of the Kingdom of Galicia and Lodomeria within Austria-Hungary, to the family of Oleksandr Halan, a minor post office official. As a child, he lived and studied in Przemyśl. He enjoyed a large collection of books gathered by his father and was greatly influenced by the creativity of the Ukrainian socialist writer Ivan Franko. At school, Yaroslav's critical thoughts brought him into conflict with priests who taught theology.

At the beginning of the First World War his father, along with other "unreliable" elements who sympathised with the Russian Empire, were imprisoned at the Thalerhof internment camp by the Austro-Hungarian authorities.

During the next Austrian offensive, in order to avoid repressions, his mother evacuated the family with the retreating Russian army to Rostov-on-Don, where Yaroslav studied at the gymnasium and performed in the local theatre. Living there, Halan witnessed the events of the October Revolution. He became familiar with Lenin's agitation. Later, these events formed the basis of his story, Unforgettable Days.

While in Rostov-on-Don, he discovered the works of Russian writers such as Leo Tolstoy, Maxim Gorky, Vissarion Belinsky, and Anton Chekhov. Thus, his obsession with this art was born, which in the future guided his decision to become a playwright.

== Student years ==
After the war, Halan returned to Galicia, which was annexed into the Second Polish Republic after the Treaty of Riga. In 1922, he graduated from the Peremyshl Ukrainian Gymnasium. He then studied at the Trieste Higher Trade School in Italy, and in 1922 enrolled in the University of Vienna. In 1926, he transferred to the Jagiellonian University of Kraków, from which he graduated in 1928 (according to some sources he didn't pass the final exams). Halan then began working as a teacher of the Polish language and literature at a private gymnasium in Lutsk. However, ten months later he was banned from teaching due to political concerns.

In his student years, Halan became active in left-wing politics. While at the University of Vienna he became a member of the workers' community Einheit ("Unity"), overseen by the Communist Party of Austria. From 1924, he was actively involved in resisting Polish rule in western Ukraine as a member of the Communist Party of Western Ukraine. He joined the CPWU while he was on vacation in Przemyśl. Later, while studying in Kraków, he was elected a deputy chairman of the Życie student group, which was controlled by the Communist Party of Poland.

=== Creativity and political struggle in Poland ===
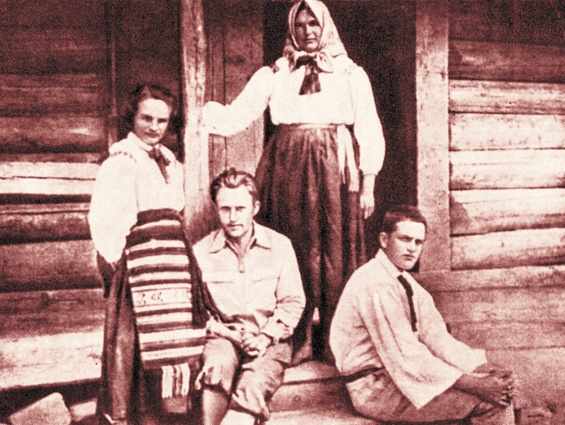
Yaroslav Halan with his first wife Anna Henyk and her relatives in the village Bereziv, 1929

In the 1920s, Halan's creative activity also began. In 1927, he finished work on his first significant play, Don Quixote from Ettenheim. In his play 99% (1930), he condemned Ukrainian nationalism. This was followed by emphasis of class conflict in the plays Cargo (1930) and Cell (1932), which argued for the Ukrainian, Jewish and Polish proletariat to work together.

Halan's play 99% was staged by the semi-legal Lviv Workers' Theatre. On the eve of the premiere, Polish authorities launched a campaign of mass arrest against Western Ukrainian communists, sending them to the Lutsk prison. As the theatre's director and one of the key actors were arrested, the premiere was on the verge of failure. Despite the risks of being arrested, the workers continued rehearsing so that the play was presented with a delay of only one day. About 600 workers attended the premiere; for them, it was a form of protest mobilisation against repression and nationalism.

Halan was one of the founders of the Ukrainian proletarian writers' group Horno. From 1927 to 1932, along with other communist writers and members of the CPWU, he worked for the Lviv-based Ukrainian magazine Vikna, being a member of its editorial board, until it was closed by government censors.

Living in the Polish-controlled city of Lviv, Halan translated novels from German into Polish to earn a living. In 1932, he moved to Nyzhniy Bereziv, the native village of his wife, located in the Carpathian mountains, close to Kolomyia, where he worked on his own plays, stories and articles. In the village he spread communist agitation among peasants, creating cells of the International Red Aid and the Committee for Famine Relief. Without opportunities to find work, he lived in the countryside until June 1935, when he was summoned by the CPWU to return to Lviv.

Halan was denied Soviet citizenship in 1935.

In 1935, Halan traveled extensively around Prykarpattia, giving speeches to peasants. He became active as a communist propagandist and political agitator. Addressing the city workers, Halan explained to them the main points of Marxist theory. In particular, he held lectures on Friedrich Engels's Socialism: Utopian and Scientific, and Karl Marx's Wage Labour and Capital. Together with the young communist writer Olexa Havryliuk, Halan organized safe houses, wrote leaflets and proclamations, and transferred illegal literature to Lviv.

Throughout his political career, the writer was repeatedly persecuted, and twice imprisoned (for the first time in 1934). He was one of the organizers of the Lviv Anti-Fascist Congress of Cultural Workers in May 1936. Halan also took part in a major political demonstration on 16 April 1936 in Lviv, in which the crowd was fired on by Polish police (in total, thirty workers were killed and two hundred injured). Halan devoted his story Golden Arch to the memory of fallen comrades.

Participation in the Anti-Fascist Congress forced him to escape from Lviv to Warsaw, where he eventually found work at the left-wing newspaper Dziennik Popularny, edited by Wanda Wasilewska. In 1937, the newspaper was closed by the authorities, and on 8 April, Halan was accused of illegal communist activism and sent to prison in Warsaw (later transferred to Lviv). Released in December 1937, Halan lived in Lviv under strict supervision by the police, and remained unemployed until 1939.

In 1937, his elder brother, a member of the CPWU, died in Lviv. After the Communist Party of Poland and the Communist Party of Western Ukraine, as its autonomous organization, were dissolved by the Comintern on trumped-up accusations of spying for Poland in 1938, Halan's first wife Anna Henyk (also a member of the CPWU), who was studying at the Kharkiv Medical Institute, was arrested by the NKVD and executed in the Great Purge.

== In Soviet Lviv ==
After the Soviet Union annexed Western Ukraine and Western Belarus in September 1939, Halan worked for the newspaper Vilna Ukraina, directed the Maria Zankovetska Theatre and wrote more than 100 pamphlets and articles on changes taking place in the reunified lands of Western Ukraine.

A group of writers such as Yaroslav Halan, Petro Kozlaniuk, Stepan Tudor and Olexa Havryliuk [...] treated the liberation of Western Ukraine [by the Red Army] as a logical conclusion of the policy of the Communist Party, which fought for the reunification of the Ukrainian people. In this, they actively helped the party in word and deed. In return, they have already had experience with Polish prisons and oppression from their fellow countrymen. Now [after it happened] they could breathe a sigh of relief. That is why their smiles were so sincere and celebratory."

— Petro Panch, "Lviv, 42 Copernicus Street", Vitchyzna, 1960, No. 2, 172

In November 1939, Halan went to Kharkiv to try to locate his vanished wife, Anna Henyk. Together with the writer Yuriy Smolych he came to the dormitory of the Medical Institute and asked the porter for any information about her fate. The porter only gave him back a suitcase with Anna's belongings and said that she had been arrested by the NKVD, in response to which Halan burst into tears.

In June 1941, being a journalist of the newspaper Vilna Ukraina, he took his first professional vacation in Crimea. This was interrupted by the beginning of Operation Barbarossa on 22 June of that year.

== War period ==
When the war on the Eastern Front began, Halan arrived in Kharkiv and went to the military commissariat, having a strong desire to become a volunteer of the Red Army and to go to the frontline, but was denied.

He was evacuated to Ufa. In September 1941, Alexander Fadeyev summoned him to Moscow for working at the Polish-language magazine Nowe Horyzonty. In the days of the Battle for Moscow, on 17 October, he was evacuated to Kazan.

Later the writer arrived in Saratov, where he served as a radio host at the Taras Shevchenko Radio Station. Then he was a special front-line correspondent of the newspaper Sovietskaya Ukraina, and then Radianska Ukraina.

The majority of his radio-comments have been born spontaneously. He listens to the enemy's radio shows, thinks for a while, then goes to the studio with an open microphone and without any preparations responds, expressing everything what he feels. That was a true radio-battle with all Hitler's propagandists starting from Goebbels, Dietrich, and others. The opportunity to fight like this – immediately, without paper [and censorship] – demonstrates a high confidence given to him by the government and the Central Committee of the CPSU(b).

— Vladimir Belyaev, Literaturna Ukraina, 1962

In 1943, in Moscow, he met his future second wife Maria Krotkova, who was an artist.

In October 1943, the publishing house Moscovskiy Bolshevik released a collection of 15 war stories by Halan under the title Front on Air. At the end of the year, Halan moved to the recently liberated Kharkiv and worked there on the frontline radio station in Dnipro.

== Post-war ==
Halan, as a correspondent of the Radianska Ukraina newspaper, represented the Soviet Union at the Nuremberg trials in 1946.

Halan often wrote about the Organisation of Ukrainian Nationalists, condemning them as murderers and war criminals. He privately expressed resentment for this as outside of his field, but continued to write and publish anti-nationalist literature.

The fourteen-year-old girl can't calmly look at meat. She trembles if someone is going to cook cutlets in her presence. A few months ago, on Easter Night, armed people came to a peasant house in a village close to the town of Sarny, and stabbed its inhabitants with knives. The girl having the eyes widened of fear was looking at the agony of her parents. The girl with horror in her eyes was looking at the agony of her parents. One of the gangsters put a knife blade to the child's neck, but at the last moment a new "idea" came to his mind: "Live in glory to Stepan Bandera! And to avoid you being starved to death we will leave you some food. Guys, slice pork for her!" The "guys" liked such a proposal. In a few minutes a mountain of meat made from the bleeding father and mother grew up in front of the horror-struck girl...

— Halan, With Cross or Knife, page 70

In his last satirical pamphlets Yaroslav Halan criticized the nationalistic and clerical reaction (particularly, the Greek Catholic Church and the anti-Communist doctrine of the Holy See), in pieces such as: Their Face (1948), In the service of Satan (1948), In the Face of Facts (1949), Father of Darkness and His Henchmen (1949), The Vatican Idols Thirst for Blood (1949, in Polish), Twilight of the Alien Gods (1948), What Should Not Be Forgotten (1947), The Vatican Without Mask (1949) etc.

When the Holy See discovered that Halan planned to publish his new anti-clerical pamphlet The Father of Darkness and His Henchmen, Pope Pius XII excommunicated him in July 1949. In response, Halan wrote the pamphlet I Spit on the Pope, which attracted considerable attention within the Catholic Church and among believers. In the pamphlet he ironised on the Decree against Communism released by the Vatican on 1 July, in which the Holy See had threatened to excommunicate all members of the Communist parties and active supporters of the Communists:

My only consolation is that I am not alone: together with me, the Pope excommunicated at least three hundred million people, and with them I once again in full voice declare: I spit on the Pope!

— Halan, With Cross or Knife, "I Spit on the Pope!", page 112

== Assassination ==
Halan's body after the murder on 24 October 1949.

Halan was assassinated on 24 October 1949 in his home office, which was situated at Hvadiyska street in Lviv. He received eleven blows to the head with an axe. His blood spilled on the manuscript of his new article, Greatness of the Liberated Human, which celebrated the tenth anniversary of the Soviet annexation of western Ukraine.

The killers – two students of the Lviv Forestry Technical Institute, Ilariy Lukashevych and Mykhailo Stakhur – were accused of orchestrating the assassination at the behest of the OUN's leadership. On the eve of the murder Lukashevych gained the writer's confidence, so the students were let into the house. They came to the apartment under the pretext of being discriminated against at the university and seeking his help. When Lukashevych gave a signal, Stakhur attacked the writer with the axe. After Stakhur was convinced that Halan was dead, they tied up the housekeeper and escaped.

The Ministry of the State Security (MGB) accused the Ukrainian nationalists for his murder, while the OUN claimed that it was a Soviet provocation in order to start a new wave of repressions against locals.

Nikita Khrushchev, the leader of the Ukrainian SSR at that time, took personal control of the investigation. In 1951, the MGB agent Bohdan Stashynsky infiltrated into the OUN underground network and managed to find Stakhur, who himself bragged about assassinating Halan. He was arrested on 10 July, and afterwards fully admitted his responsibility for the crime during the trial. According to Stakhur, he did that because of the writer's critical statements against the Organization of Ukrainian Nationalists, Ukrainian Insurgent Army and the Vatican.

On 16 October 1951 the military tribunal of the Carpathian Military District sentenced Mykhailo Stakhur to death by hanging. He was executed the same day.

Since the dissolution of the Soviet Union, the role of the UPA in Halan's assassination has come under increasing scrutiny. Historian David R. Marples has noted that the methods of the assassination were more similar to the prior killing of Leon Trotsky, which was organised by Soviet intelligence, than typical OUN or UPA assassinations; in contrast to the usage of an axe by Halan's killers, the OUN usually conducted its killings with firearms. Petro Duzhyi, a soldier of the UPA, claimed in a 1993 interview with historian Mykola Oleksyuk that Timofei Strokach expressed a desire to have Halan killed; according to Duzhyi, Strokach had said during an interrogation that Halan's support for arresting the Ukrainian Greek Catholic Church's leadership had sparked a popular uprising. Ukrainian literary historian Yuliia Kysla argues that the assassination was a false-flag operation, referring to Lukashevych and Stakhur as being part of one of many groups which were supposedly part of the UPA, but were actually under the control of the Soviet government. Vasyl Kuk, the leader of the UPA, would continue to claim that the assassination had been organised by the MGB in interviews after the Soviet Union's dissolution.

The possibility that he was assassinated by the OUN or UPA, however, has not been conclusively ruled out. Dmitry Vedeneyev and Sergei Shevchenko, writers for the Ukrainian newspaper 2000, compared Halan to Salman Rushdie in 2002 in reference to the latter's Satanic Verses controversy and noted that Halan's criticism of the Catholic Church made him extremely unpopular in deeply-religious Galicia. Marples also notes that there are several problems with most accounts of Halan's assassination and the aftermath, arguing that it is effectively impossible to determine who was responsible for his assassination given that he was equally loathed by both the Soviet government and the UPA at the time of his death.

The assassination of Halan resulted in increased repression of the UPA, which continued its insurgency against the Soviet government. All the leadership of the MGB arrived in Lviv, Pavel Sudoplatov himself worked there for several months. One of the consequences of the murder of Halan was the elimination of the UPA leader Roman Shukhevych four months later.

== Evaluations by contemporaries ==
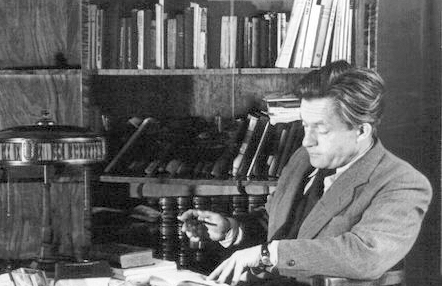
The writer at his home office where he usually worked. 1947.

"Yaroslav Halan is a talented publicist, was a progressive writer in the past. Nowadays he still is the most advanced one among [local] non-party writers. But he's infected with the Western European bourgeois "spirit". Has little respect for Soviet people. Considers them not civilized enough. But just inwardly. In general terms, he understands the policy of the party, but in his opinion, the party makes great mistakes with regards to peasants in Western Ukraine. Halan places responsibility for these mistakes on the regional committee of the CPSU(b), local institutions of the Ministry of Internal Affairs and the local Soviet authorities. Believes in Moscow. Doesn't want to join the party (he was advised to) due to being an individualist, and also in order to keep his hands, mind, and words free. He thinks if he joins the party, he will lose this [freedom]."

Extract from the report of the literary critic G. Parkhomenko to the Central Committee of the Communist Party (Bolshevik) of Ukraine, 15 December 1947.

In 1962, in Toronto, Olexandr Matla, aka Petro Tereschuk, a pro-nationalist historian from the Ukrainian diaspora in Canada, published the brochure History of a Traitor (Yaroslav Halan), in which he accused Halan of being an informer of both Polish and Soviet intelligence services, and of helping them to oppress nationalists and even some pro-Soviet writers from Western Ukraine such as Anton Krushelnytsky, who moved from Lviv to Kharkiv in the 1930s and was killed during the Great Terror.

"[Halan] has used his undeniable publicistic talent to serve the enemy, thereby placing himself outside the Ukrainian people. He has directed his energy and creative mind against his own people and their interests. An outrageous egoist, egocentrist, money lover, slanderer, cynic, provocator, agent of two intelligence services, misanthrope, falsificator, speculator, and an informer are all the characteristics of Yaroslav Halan."

Petro Tereschuk, History of a Traitor (Yaroslav Halan), Canadian League for Ukraine's Liberation, Toronto, 1962.

"Yaroslav is an erudite, artist, polemicist, politician and undoubtedly an international-level journalist. I was amazed at his knowledge of the languages: German, French, Italian, Polish, Jewish, Russian. Picking up any newspaper or document he leafs through, reads it and writes something down. I was also surprised by his efficiency in work, interest in everything, an exceptional ability to "seek" and "raise" topics, problems, his persistent work on processing the material."

Yuri Yanovsky, a Ukrainian Soviet writer, who worked with Halan at the Nuremberg Trial in 1946.

"In 1949 I witnessed an unusual event. On 2 October Yaroslav Halan spoke in Lviv University. It turned out to be his last speech. We condemned him but his presentation surprised me. He spoke as an intelligent person defending Ukrainian culture. It had nothing to do with the series of his pamphlets "I spit on Pope!" Halan turned out to be a totally different man. Several days later he was killed."

Mykhailo Horyn, a Ukrainian anti-Communist dissident.

== Homage ==
- In 1954, the movie It Shouldn't Be Forgotten, based on Halan's life events, with Sergei Bondarchuk in the main role was released. In 1973, another movie based on the biography of Halan, Until the Last Minute with Vladislav Dvorzhetsky in the main role was released.
- In 1969, the studio Ukrkinokhronika filmed the documentary Yaroslav Halan about the life of the writer.
- The Dovzhenko Film Studios, in 1958, filmed Halan's work Under the Golden Eagle, but the film wasn't released as it was considered "too anti-American". His novel The Mountains are Smoking was made into a film in 1989 by the Ukrtelefilm studio.
- In 1962, 1970 and 1976, the USSR Post issued postal envelopes with a portrait of Yaroslav Halan.
- A monument to Yaroslav Halan was installed in Lviv in 1972. Besides, the square where the monument was situated was named after Halan. In 1992, on the eve of the Vatican officials' visit, the local authorities demolished the monument, and its metal was used for constructing a monument to the Prosvita, a nationalist organization which Halan fought with. There was another monument to the writer in the city Park of Culture installed in 1957 and demolished in the 1960s. A monument to Halan also existed in Drohobych that was demolished in the 1990s.
- In 1960, Halan's personal apartment at 18 Hvardiyska street, where he lived in 1944–1949, was turned into his personal museum. The museum stored writer's personal belongings, documents, and materials about his literary and social activity, publications of his works. In the 1990s, it was under threat of closure, but eventually, it was transformed into the museum of Literary Lviv of the First Half of the XX Century.
- From 1964 to 1991, the Yaroslav Halan Prize was awarded by the Writers' Union of Ukraine for the best propagandistic journalism.
- In 1979, the Council of Ministers of the Ukrainian SSR established the Yaroslav Halan Scholarship for talented students of the Taras Shevchenko Kyiv State University and Ivan Franko Lviv State University.
- In the 1970s, in the Lviv Region, there was a network of 450 atheist clubs named after Yaroslav Halan.
- Halan's works in three volumes were published in Kyiv in 1977–1978.
- From 1967 to 1987, the Lviv-based publisher Kameniar issued the anti-fascist and anti-clerical almanac Post Named After Yaroslav Halan. In total, 22 issues were published.
- The streets named after Halan existed in Kyiv, Kharkiv, Kryvyi Rih, Odesa, Chernihiv, Dnipro, Lviv, Khmelnytskyi, Poltava, Cherkasy, Chernivtsi, Kalush, Nikopol, Uzhgorod, Mukachevo, Berzhany, Korosten, and Novograd Volynskyi but they were renamed within the campaign against the Soviet memorial legacy. In Soviet times, in Saratov, the name of Yaroslav Halan was given to the street where he worked at the Taras Shevchenko Radio Station. After the USSR collapsed, the street recovered its historical name Proviantskaya.
- In Donetsk, Luhansk, Enakievo, Torez, Shostka, and Rostov-on-Don, there are still the streets bearing the name of Halan.
- The Lviv Regional Theatre of Drama (Drohobych) and Kolomyia Regional Theatre of Drama (Kolomyia) were given the name of Yaroslav Halan. They were renamed in the 1990s.
- The Ternopil Pedagogical Institute and Lutsk Pedagogical College received the name of Yaroslav Halan. They were renamed in the 1990s.
- The Lviv Regional Library for Adults, established by the Soviet authorities in the Besyadetski Palace building, and the Kyiv Regional Library for Youth received the name of Yaroslav Halan. These were renamed in the 1990s. One of the district libraries in Kharkiv still bears the writer's name.
- In 1954, the Yaroslav Halan Cinema was built in Lychakiv district, Lviv. It was renamed in the 1990s and is nowadays abandoned.
- Halan's name was given to kolkhozes in the following villages: Vuzlove (Radekhiv Raion, Lviv Oblast), Dytiatychi (Mostyska Raion, Lviv Region), Mistky (Pustomyty Raion, Lviv Oblast), Turynka (Zhovkva Raion, Lviv Oblast) Volodymyrivka (Domanivka Raion, Mykolaiv Oblast), Seredniy Bereziv (Kosiv Raion, Ivano-Frankivsk Oblast), Hnylytsi (Pidvolochysk Raion, Ternopil Oblast).
- The name of Yaroslav Halan was given to a passenger steamer of the Belsky river shipping company, which operated on the Moscow-Ufa line. Currently, it is out of use.
- In 2012, the Verkhovna Rada of Ukraine adopted the resolution About the celebration of the 110th anniversary of the birth of the famous Ukrainian anti-fascist writer Yaroslav Oleksandrovych Halan.
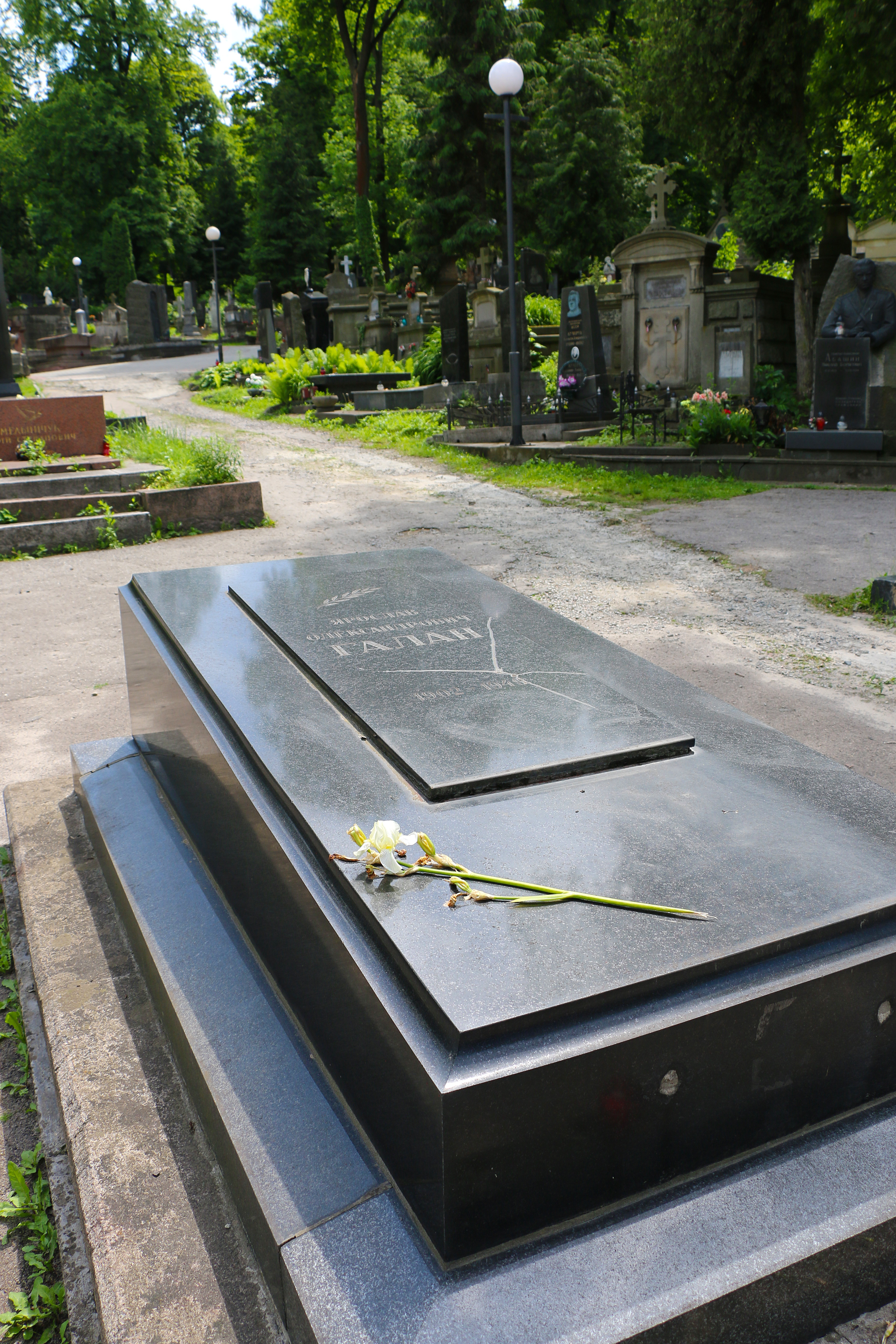
Writer's grave at the Lychakiv Cemetery

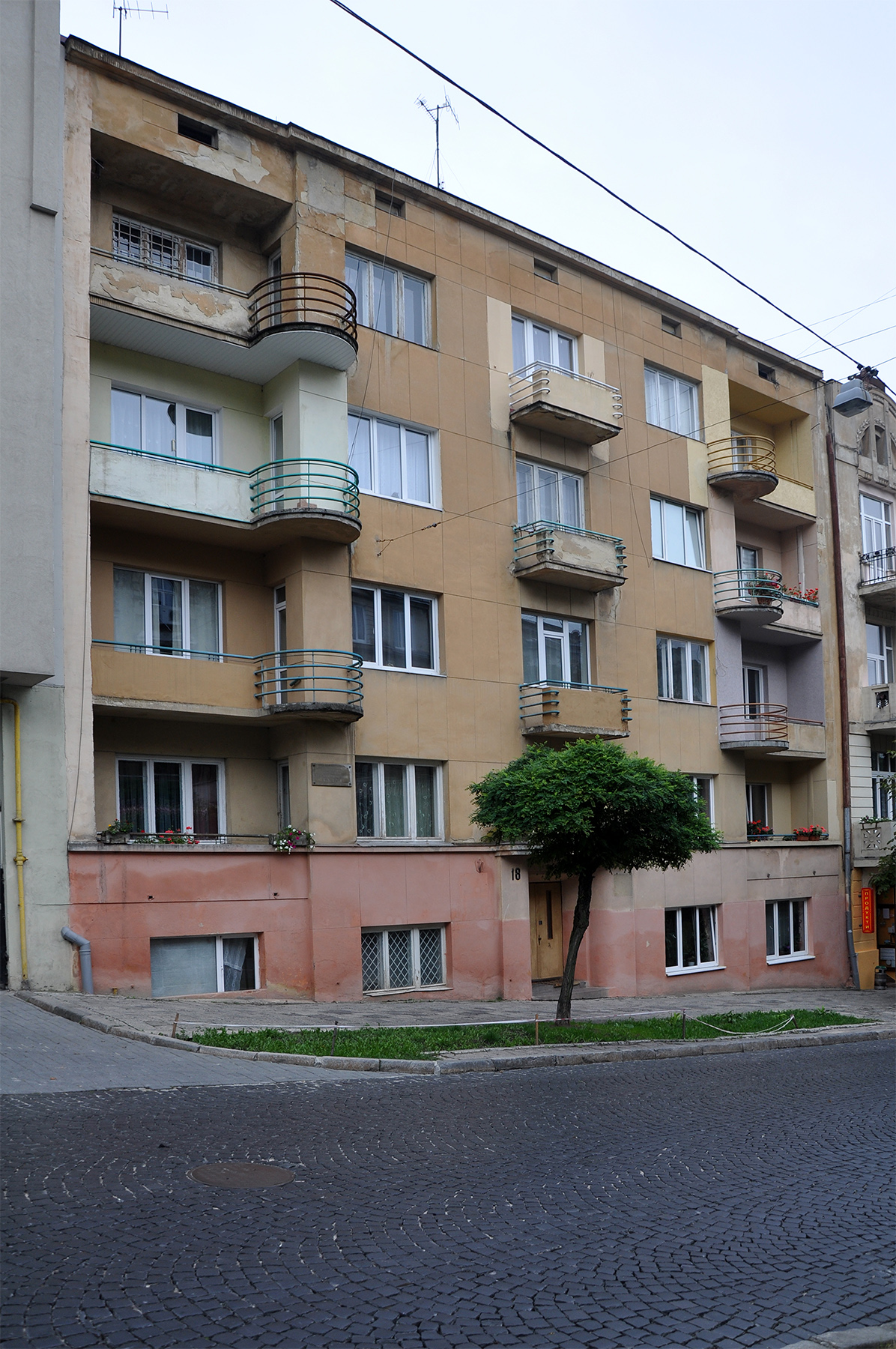
Halan's house in Lviv at Havrdiyska str. 18

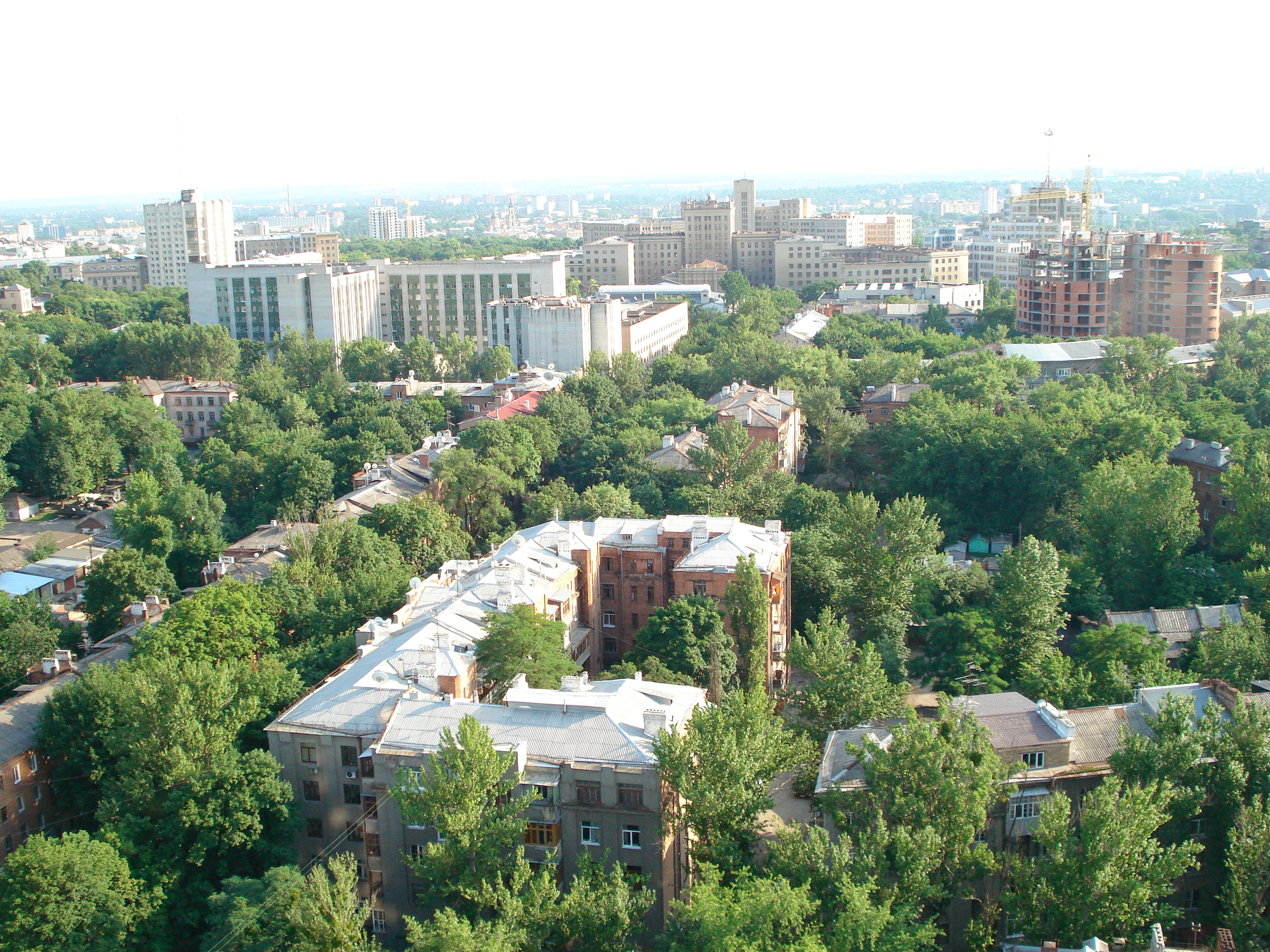
Former Yaroslav Halan street in Kharkiv (renamed in 2016)

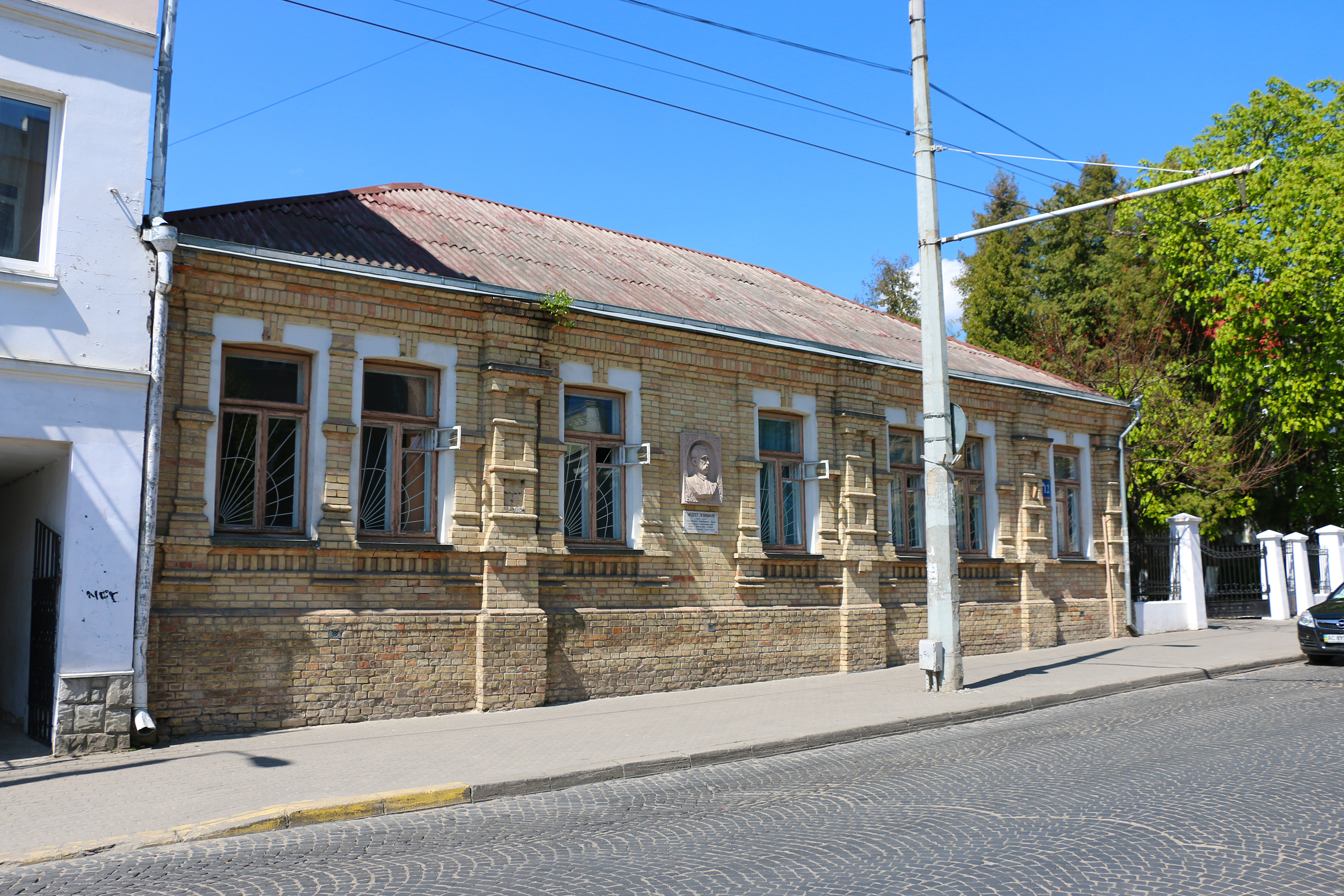
Former building of the Ukrainian gymnasium of Lutsk where Halan worked.

== Awards ==
- Order of the Badge of Honour – twice
- Stalin Prize of the 2nd class (1952, posthumously)
- Medal "For Valiant Labour in the Great Patriotic War 1941–1945"

== Works ==
=== Plays ===
- Don Quixote from Ettenheim (1927)
- 99% (1930)
- Cargo (1930)
- Veronika (1930)
- Cell (1932)
- They Decide (1934)
- Vienna Speaks (1935, lost)
- Shumi Maritsa (1942, in Russian)
- Under the Golden Eagle (1947)
- Love at Dawn (1949, published in 1951)
- Bozhena Shramek (unfinished)

=== Stories and articles (selected) ===
- Unforgettable Days (1930)
- Punishment (1932)
- Three Deaths (1932)
- Virgin Lands (1932)
- Unknown Petro (1932)
- Savko Is Flooded With Blood (1935)
- Dead Are Fighting (1935)
- The Mountains are Smoking (1938, in Polish)
- On the Bridge (1940)
- Yoasia (1940)
- Forget-Me-Not (1940)
- Grandfather Martyn (1940)
- Jenny (1941)
- Miss Mccarty is Losing Faith (1946)
- School (1946)

=== Pamphlets (selected) ===
- With Cross or With Knife (1945)
- Their Face (1947)
- What Should Not Be Forgotten, (1947)
- In the service of Satan (1948)
- Twilight of the Alien Gods (1948, in Russian)
- In the Face of Facts (1949)
- Father of Darkness And His Henchmen (1949)
- The Vatican Idols Thirst for Blood (1949, in Polish)
- The Vatican Without Mask (1949)
- I Spit on the Pope (1949)

=== Single books ===
- Front on Air (1943, radio speeches)

=== Translations ===
- The War Widow, by Leonhard Frank (1932, from German into Ukrainian)
- Three Domobrans, by Miroslav Krleža (1932, excerpt, from Croatian into Ukrainian)
- The Gadfly, by Ethel Voynich (1947, from English into Ukrainian)
- The Sisters, by Doriana Slepian (1948, from Russian into Ukrainian)

=== Adapted Screenplays ===
- Under the Golden Eagle (1958)
- The Mountains are Smoking (1989)

=== Collected works ===
English

- We must not forget. Moscow: Novosti Press Agency Publishing House, 1975
- Reports from Nuremberg. Kyiv: Dnipro Publishers, 1976
- People Without a Homeland: Pamphlets. Kyiv: Dnipro Publishers, 1974
- Lest People Forget: Pamphlets, Articles and Reports. Kyiv: Dnipro Publishers, 1986

Spanish

- Reportajes de Nuremberg. Kyiv: Dnipro Publishers. 1976

German

- "Nürnberg 1945 : Pamphlete". Kiew: Dnipro, 1975.

Russian

- Favorites. Translation from Ukrainian. Moscow: publishing house Sovetskiy Pisatel, 1951.
- Favorites. Translation from Ukrainian. Moscow: publishing house Sovetskiy Pisatel, 1952.
- The Vatican Without a Mask. Translation from Ukrainian. Moscow, publishing house Literaturnaya Gazeta, 1952.
- Plays. Moscow: Iskusstvo. 1956.
- With Cross or With Knife: Pamphlets. Moscow: 1962
- Light from the East. Translation from Ukrainian. Moscow, publishing house Molodaya Guàrdia, 1954.
- Favorites. Translation from Ukrainian. Moscow, Goslitizdat, 1958.

Ukrainian

- Favorites. Kyiv: publishing house Radianskyi Pysmennyk, 1951.
- Works. In 2 volumes. Kyiv: Derzhlitvidav, 1953.
- Works. In 3 volumes. Kyiv: Derzhlitvidav, 1960.
- Unfinished Song. Kyiv: Dnipro Publishers. 1972.
- Favorites. Lviv: Shkilna Biblioteka. 1976
- Works: Pamphlets and Fayletons. Kyiv:Naukova Dumka. 1980.
- Works. Kyiv: Naukova Dumka. 1980.
- Dramas. Lviv: Kameniar. 1981
- Favorites. Lviv: Kameniar. 1987.

Azerbaijani

- Ukrainian Stories. Azərnəşr. 1954

== Bibliography ==
- Беляев В., Ёлкин А. Ярослав Галан. – М.: Молодая гвардия, 1971. – (Жизнь замечательных людей)
- Галан Ярослав: Енциклопедія історії України: Т. 2. Редкол.: В. А. Смолій (голова) та ін. НАН України. Інститут історії України. – Київ 2004, "Наукова думка". ISBN 966-00-0632-2.
- Терещенко Петро. Історія одного зрадника (Ярослва Галан). Торонто: Канадаська ліга за визволення України, 1962.
- Галан Ярослав, Спогади про письменника, Львiв, вид-во "Каменяр", 1965.
- Вальо М. А. Ярослав Галан (1902–1949): до 80-річчя з дня народження. Бібліографічний покажчик. – Львів, 1982.
- Про Ярослава Галана: Спогади, статті. – К., 1987.
- Ярослав Галан – борець за правду і справедливість: Документи // Український історичний журнал. – 1990. – No. 2—3.
- Рубльов О. С., Черченко Ю. А. Сталінщина й доля західноукраїнської інтелігенції (20—50-ті роки XX ст.) – К., 1994.
- Бантышев А. Ф., Ухаль А. М. Убийство на заказ: кто же организовал убийство Ярослава Галана? Опыт независимого расследования. – Ужгород, 2002.
- Цегельник Я. Славен у віках. Образ Львова у спадщині Я. Галана // Жовтень. – 1982. – No. 3 (449). – С. 72–74. – ISSN 0131-0100.
- "Боротьба трудящихся Львівщини проти Нiмецько-фашистьских загарбників". Львів, вид-во "Вільна Україна", 1949.
- Буряк Борис, Ярослав Галан. В кн.: Галан Я., Избранное. М., Гослитиздат, 1958, стр. 593–597.
- Даниленко С., Дорогою ганьби і зради. К., вид-во "Наукова думка", 1970.
- Довгалюк Петро, В кн.: Галан Я., Твори в трьох томах, К., Держлітвидав, 1960, стр. 5–44.
- Добрич Володимир, У тіні святого Юра. Львiв, вид-во "Каменяр", 1968.
- Евдокименко В. Ю., Критика ідейних основ украінського буржуазного націоналізму. К., вид-во "Наукова думка", 1967.
- Ёлкин Анатолий, Ярослав Галан в борьбе с католической и американской реакцией. "Вестник Ленинградского университета", 1951, No. 10, стр. 85–100.
- Елкин Анатолий, Ярослав Галан. (Новые материалы.) "Звезда", 1952, No. 7, стр. 163–172.
- Елкин Анатолий, Библиография противоватиканских работ Я. А. Галана. В кн.: "Вопросы истории религии и атеизма". М., изд-во АН СССР, т. 2, 1954, стр. 288–292.
- Елкин Анатолий, Ярослав Галан. Очерк жизни и творчества. М., изд-во "Советский писатель", 1955.
- Елкин Анатолий, Степан Тудор. Критико-биографич. очерк. М., изд-во "Советский писатель", 1956.
- Замлинський Володимир, Шлях чорної зради. Львів, вид-во "Каменяр", 1969.
- Косач Юрий, Вид феодалізму до неофашизму. Нью-Йорк, 1962.
- "Людьскоі крові не змити". Книга фактів. К, 1970.
- Мельничук Ю., Ярослав Галан. Львівске кн. – журн. вид-во, 1953.
- Млинченко К. М., Зброєю полум'яного слова. К., вид-во АН УССР, 1963.
- Млот Франтишек, Мешок иуд, или Разговор о клерикализме. Краков, 1911. На польском языке.
- Полевой Борис. В конце концов. М., изд-во "Советская Россия", 1969.
- "Пост имени Ярослава Галана". Сборник. Львів, вид-во "Каменяр", 1967.
- "Правда про унію". Документи і матеріяли. Львiв, вид-во "Каменяр", 1968.
- Терлиця Марко, "Правнуки погані". Киев, изд-во "Радянський письменник", 1960.
- Терлиця Марко. Націоналістичі скорпіони. Киев, изд-во "Радянський письменник", 1963.
- "Ті, що канули в пітьму". Львів, вид-во "Каменяр", 1968.
- Ткачев П. И., Вечный бой. Минск, изд-во БГУ, 1970.
- Цегельник Яків, В кн.: Галан Ярослав, Спогади про письменника. Львів, вид-во "Каменяр", 1965.
- Чередниченко В., Націоналізм против націі. К., 1970.
