= Havryliuk =

Havryliuk or Havrylyuk (Ukrainian: Гаврилюк)is a Ukrainian patronymic surname. Notable people with the surname include:

- Mykhailo Havryliuk, Ukrainian activist and politician
- Oleksandr Havryliuk, Ukrainian writer and activist

== See also ==
- Gavrilyuk
- Gavrylyuk
- Gavriliuc
