= Lisa Gavrić =

Austrian-born communist who was an Internationalist participant in the Spanish Civil War

- Born: Elisabeth Bechmann; 31 July 1907; Vienna, Austria-Hungary
- Died: 22 June 1974; Dubna, Moscow, Soviet Union
- Occupations: Political activist Spanish Civil War medical brigadist Résistance activist Languages teacher (Berlitz); Political instructor Print & radio journalist
- Political party: KPÖ; KPJ
- Spouse: Milan Gavrić
- Children: Inga Tarassowa

Lisa Gavrić (born Elisabeth Bechmann; 31 July 1907 – 22 June 1974) was an Austrian-born communist who became an Internationalist participant in the Spanish Civil War. Subsequently, she worked on behalf of the German resistance movement with the French Résistance. After several unsuccessful attempts to return to Vienna, she finally managed to make the journey, using a false identity, during 1943. In July 1944 she was arrested by the security services and deported to the women's concentration camp at Ravensbrück. However, after acquiring a false identity and thereby identified as a foreign detainee, she was deported to Sweden during the final months of the war. She moved in 1948 Yugoslavia where she lived out her final decades, undertaking political work in Belgrade.

== Life ==
=== Provenance and early years ===
Elisabeth "Lisa" Bechmann was born into a lower-middle-class family in Vienna. Her father was a railway worker. She and her siblings were strictly brought up. She trained and qualified for work as a hat-maker. Through her older sister Trude (who had attended university, but had been relegated from it on account of her "political activities"), Lisa became involved with a Vienna Young Communists group. In 1927, no longer able to bear the "mendacious atmosphere" in her parents' house, she secretly "escaped" and made her way to Paris. Paris, according to sources, was a "random" choice. There she took lodgings in a room at the back of a house, living unregistered and working in a small manufactory. The wages were miserable, but she was able to meet a wide range of people, including expatriates such as herself.

=== Milan Gavrić ===
One of her new friends was Milan Gavrić, a communist from the recently renamed and relaunched Kingdom of Jugoslavia. He, too, had come to Paris in a spirit of deep hostility towards his own family. His father was a smallholder from Bosnian peasant stock who had grown prosperous as a businessman and money lender. In Paris Milan Gavrić had ended up at the heart of a circle of friends whose principal topics of conversation were Marxism and Communism. Lisa Bechmann was drawn into this circle: in 1929 Milan Gavrić and Lisa Bechmann were married. Their daughter Inga was born later that year. The family apartment became a conspiratorial meeting point for exiled Jugoslav communists who had fled their newly fascist homeland. Nevertheless, in 1930 Milan and Lisa Gavrić moved together in the opposite direction to Jugoslavia, driven to make the move by unemployment, poverty, hunger, concern for their daughter and the lure of the illegal but nevertheless highly active Jugoslav Communist Party.

=== Expulsion from Bosnia ===
Then new constitution issued by decree in Jugoslavia during the second half of 1931 crystallised the installation of a fascist military dictatorship which in effect had, by that stage, already been in place for more than a year. "Progressive" (antifascist) political movements were suppressed. Communists suffered persecution. Milan and Lisa Gavrić made their home in Bosnia, settling with their daughter in Tuzla, which was the city in which Milan had grown up. Communist organisations were being set up in opposition to the new régime across the country. Milan Gavrić became secretary of the Tuzla region party leadership team. Lisa backed her husband and worked for the party. According to one source she also acted as a point of contact between the communists in Jugoslavia and the Young Communists in Vienna. In January 1933 the Communist groups in Tuzla and a number of other Bosnian cities and towns were betrayed to the authorities by a spy. Members were arrested and charged with high treason. Milan Gavrić was among those arrested and sentenced to several years of imprisonment. He managed to escape and subsequently fought with Tito's partisans against the German occupation. (Note: Milan Gavrić survived the war, and after 1945 re-invented himself as a journalist. He died in 1982.) Lisa Gavrić was convicted of "communist activities" and received a ten month prison sentence. She was later expelled from Jugoslavia and at the start of 1934 fled north with her daughter to Vienna.

=== Return to Vienna ===
Austria was also in a state of turmoil at the time. The "Austrofascist" government had recently outlawed the Communist Party which nevertheless continued to operate. Gavrić arrived in time for the February uprising which had its focus in the larger cities, especially Vienna. Although the event itself lasted less than a week, it consisted of a brutal and consequential confrontation between the forces of the fascist state - the police and the army - and antifascist street protestors and paramilitary groups representing in varying proportions the forces of democracy, socialism and communism. The February insurrection is even sometimes identified, rather grandly, in English-language sources as "the Austrian Civil War". During 1934 Lisa Gavrić worked for the (now illegal) Communist Party, taking her orders from both the Austrian party and its sister party in Jugoslavia. She also helped to sustain contacts between the party and its activist youth wing.

=== Paris ===
In 1936 she was sent by the party to Paris where, following the general election in May of that year, Léon Blum's Popular Front government was installed in power. In Paris Gavrić undertook political work for the French Communist Party (which, unlike Communist Parties elsewhere in Europe, had not been outlawed and was indeed, by some criteria, part of the political mainstream). Later that year, beyond the Pyrenees, General Franco took charge of a military coup which marked the outbreak of the Spanish Civil War. Spain very quickly became the fulcrum of an international left-right military conflict. Lisa Gavrić spent the next six months undergoing a hasty programme of training in order to become a nurse-paramedic in order to be able to help in the struggle to defeat fascism in Spain. Six months later she was almost ready to go. First she handed over her daughter to French comrades in order that Inga might be well looked after. Through the mediation of the Soviet sponsored Red Aid (socialist welfare) organisation the little girl was transferred to the Soviet Union where, from 1937, Inga grew up in the Interdom / Интердом (international children's home) set up under the auspices of Red Aid in 1933 at Ivanovo, a manufacturing city to the north-east of Moscow.

=== Spanish Civil War ===
She arrived by ship at Albacete as one of a group of women destined for war-related medical work in the area. They were distributed among a number of improvised military hospitals in the region administered, for medical purposes, from Murcia. At one point Gavrić was assigned to work at the Hospital Casa Roja in the city. At another time she worked at the University Clinic in the city. The life and the work were hard, not helped by a shortage of almost every category of medical equipment and essential supplies. Fully trained specialist physicians and nurses were also in desperately short supply.

During the first part of 1939 it became apparent that the republican government and their "Internationalist" allies had been defeated by the "nationalist" insurgents. Slightly under four decades of what many, especially on the political left, characterised as fascist dictatorship began. During February 1939 large numbers of wounded international figures were brought to the French frontier, accompanied by the medical personnel who had been caring for them. At the same time thousands of civilian refugees and defeated government soldiers were making the same journey. From the Communist perspective the French government had already abandoned the democratic Spanish government through its failure to intervene in the civil war, and the French authorities now did what they could to intercept the Spanish refugees at the frontier and turn them back. The status of non-Spaniards crossing into France and self-defining as antifascists was less clear-cut. The French "Popular Front" government had collapsed progressively during 1937/38. The new Daladier government was desperately keen to avoid another European war, and for that reason determined not to upset the German dictator and his Spanish ally. Lisa Gavrić made her way back to Paris where she stayed for a few weeks. However, the city authorities were no longer prepared to extend her residence permit ("carte de séjour"), and she was sent back to the south.

=== France and Résistance ===
In the south she was taken by bus with other women to the recently constructed Gurs internment camp, where she spent the next four months. Security at this time depended largely on the camp's extremely remote location, far along up a mountain valley, and the fact that most of the internees were foreign, with little ability to speak local dialects or even French. (Inside the camp the predominant language was Spanish.) Many internees did in fact manage to escape with very little difficulty during these early months, and to find their way down from the mountains: Lisa Gavrić was one. Meanwhile, war had broken out in September 1939, and arrived in France in May 1940. Following French surrender on 22 June. the northern half of the country fell under German military occupation while the south was administered from Vichy by an ultra-conservative puppet government which, at least till 1942, enjoyed a considerable measure of autonomy in respect of domestic policy. Gavrić presumably lived hidden from the authorities and unregistered in the south after leaving Gurs. By February 1941 she had been living for some time in Arles, having established links both with the French Résistance and with residual underground elements of the Austrian Communist Party. Austria had been integrated into an expanding version of Germany since 1938, and it was while she was in Arles that she received instructions from the Austrian party to make her way back to Vienna and undertake party work there. She applied for the appropriate paperwork to the Paris office of the German Armistice Commission, but was refused the necessary permissions. (Note: Sources differ over whether the refusal of permission to leave France came from the German Armistice Commission or from the "Vichy" puppet government.)

Remaining in France, she now deepened her engagement with the French Résistance and established links with groups networked into the Soviet sponsored National Committee for a Free Germany. She worked for the Résistance on a branch of the organisation's "German work" known, among those involved, as "Mädelarbeit" (loosely, "girly work"). During 1942/43 the slaughter at Stalingrad triggered a growing appreciation that there was nothing inevitable about a German victory, and this was matched by a corresponding diminution in enthusiasm for the warfare among the surviving members of the German army and security services. Meanwhile in France the German authorities reacted to the appearance of Anglo-American armies in North Africa by imposing military occupation on the previously semi-autonomous southern half of France. German soldiers and Gestapo officers appeared on the streets, initially in the major population centres such as Marseille and Toulouse and then, increasingly, in the smaller towns. Cafés were increasingly frequented by off-duty German soldiers. "Mädelarbeit", undertaken between 1942 and 1945, was at its most effective when performed by young women able to display fluency in German, unencumbered by a French or other non-German regional accent: it was best undertaken by women who had grown up with mother-tongue German. It involved identifying off-duty soldiers who looked as though they might be dissatisfied with the progress of the war and engaging them in conversation to test their beliefs. The next stage involved befriending the soldiers, trying to persuade them (if they were not already persuaded) of the futility of the war they were fighting and encourage them to desert and / or to co-operate in anti-Hitler resistance activities. There were also opportunities to prepare and distribute German language anti-war newspapers and leaflets. The work was dangerous and exhausting. Misjudging a situation could lead to betrayal followed by deportation to the east and/or an early death. One source implies that Lisa Gavrić was recruited for "Mädelarbeit" while working as a languages teacher at a Berlitz language college which also afforded opportunities for identifying and recruiting more women suitable for the work. In the end, under the cover-name "Maria", Lisa Gavrić became the Paris-based head of a principal "Mädelarbeit" women's group in succession to Gerty Schindel.

Based in Paris during 1943, Lisa Gavrić and Thea Saefkow (under the cover names "Maria" and "Mado") also acted as points of contact between the "Free French" contingent of the French Résistance network and the little antifascist resistance cell around Kurt Hälker, operating from inside "Marinestab West", the German naval command centre based in Paris. Through the clandestine radio-based (and other) contacts that the "Free French" had with the British military, this meant that "Maria" and "Mado" were instrumental in passing important information on German naval planning from the heart of the German military command to British (and indirectly American) military planners during the critical build-up to the Liberation of Paris.

=== Second return to Vienna ===
At the end of 1943 Lisa Gavrić was one of a group of women who ordered back to Vienna by the party. This time, through careful planning and implementation of a subterfuge, they succeeded in making the transfer. Using French names and false papers the women presented themselves as French foreign workers to the authorities in Vienna, where by this time the human wastage of war had created a desperate labour shortage. For a time they were able to undertake resistance operations in the Austrian capital. Then some of the "German work" group were arrested and one of them, probably under severe torture, disclosed the truth about the contingent of "French" foreign workers who had arrived in the city at the end of 1943. "German work" group members still in Paris were able to go into hiding, but all those who had returned to Austria were arrested by the security services including, probably in June or July 1944, "Marie-Louise Béranger" (as Lisa Gavrić was named in her forged francophone identity papers).

=== Ravensbrück ===
Following her arrest she was taken, with others, to the vast canalside police complex in the Alsergrund quarter of north-central Vienna where probably she was held for approximately four months, and subjected to the usual combination of torture and interrogation. The women accused of treason, high treason, espionage and degradation of the military. However, by the second half of 1944 the justice system was one of many parts of the civil (and military) infrastructure that was beginning to disintegrate, and the authorities decided to postpone the court trial to which she and her co-accused would, under other circumstances, have been entitled, till after the war. There could, however, be no question of releasing them, so they were transported north to the women's concentration camp at Ravensbrück, just outside Berlin in the marshy flatlands alongside the main highway towards Rostock.

According to sources, only a few survived the hell of the concentration camps. Those who came out alive did so because of the solidarity and courageous interventions by members of the (illegal) camp committees. It is also clear that by 1944 the slaughter of war had left the German authorities very short of German people prepared and trusted to guard and run the camps. Administration was increasingly delegated to German speaking refugees from the east and to trusted camp inmates. Lisa Gavrić survived the "most terrible" six months of her life at the Ravensbrück concentration camp. Using false papers that identified her, once again, as a French woman, and employing, this time, the French-sounding name "Louise Desmeth", on 25 April 1945 she was a passenger in one of a long convoy of buses leaving Ravensbrück on the road north towards Sweden as part of the Red Cross "White Buses" scheme. (Note: It is believed that approximately 7,500 women, identified as non-German, were transported by bus from Ravensbrück to Sweden between 5 April 1945 and 26 April 1945 under the so-called "White Buses agreement" negotiated between the Swedish diplomat Count Bernadotte and the German leader Heinrich Himmler during the closing weeks of the war. The total number of non-German prisoners evacuated on this basis from all German concentration camps is believed to have been around 31,000.)

=== Return to peace ===
Travelling via Denmark, the convoy arrived in Sweden on 26 April 1945, a couple of weeks before the war in Europe ended. As part of the rescue operation, the Swedish government provided for each former concentration inmate to be permitted to remain in Sweden for a six month recovery period, and then decide whether s/he wished to settle in Sweden permanently or "return home". Gavrić was accommodated in a large villa near Stockholm with fourteen French women and five other Austrian women. There was an uplifting spirit of relief and optimism and relief among them, but also a strong sense of obligation that they should return to their homelands and contribute to the massive and urgent job of post-war reconstruction. Gavrić stayed in Sweden for long enough to recover from the worst effects of the psychological and physical damage to which she had been subjected in the camp, and then went back - again - to Vienna.

Back in Vienna (which remained divided into separately administered sectors under military occupation between 1945 and 1955) she was briefly reunited with her daughter Inga, but Inga had grown up in the Soviet Union and now decided to make her life there. Meanwhile, Gavrić took a job as a party official in the "department for women's work" ("Abteilung für Frauenarbeit"). The party also employed her in Vienna as General Secretary for the Society of Austrian-Jugoslav friendship. At the end of 1948, almost certainly in response to the serious diplomatic and political breach between Yugoslavia and the Soviet Union earlier that year, as the leading figure in the "Society of Austrian-Jugoslav friendship", that Lisa Gavrić, relocated to the Belgrade. According to one source she teamed up with her husband in Belgrade, but other sources are conspicuously silent over whether or not the two of them were ever reunited after Lisa's expulsion from Jugoslavia in 1933/34. There are, however, references in other sources to Gavrić and her daughter having remained in touch with one another, and "visited each other frequently".

In Belgrade she worked as an instructor for members of the German specialist department at the Trades Unions National Council. Laster she took over as editor in chief at the journal "Schaffende", also working as a commentator with the Germany section at Radio Jugoslavia (as the country's international radio broadcaster was known at that time). During the final years before she retired Lisa Gavrić worked at the Jugoslav "Institute for International Economic and Political Problems".

During the mid-1950s Lisa Gavrić suffered a long serious illness, from which she recovered. Twenty years later, however, while visiting her daughter in Dubna (just outside and to the north of Moscow) she suffered a heart attack from which on, 22 June 1974, she died a few weeks short of what would have been her 67th birthday.
