= Henryk Dembiński (politician) =

Polish political activist and journalist

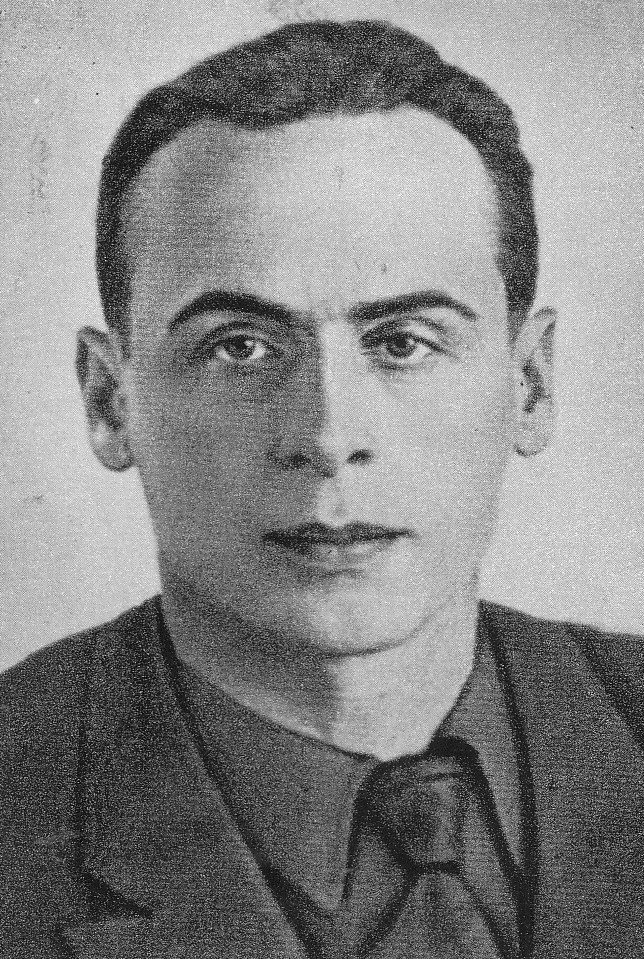
Henryk Dembiński

Henryk Dembiński (31 July 1908 – 12 August 1941) was a Polish political activist and journalist.

== Biography ==
Dembiński studied philosophy and law at the Stefan Batory University in Vilnius. During his studies he was a member of the Association of Catholic Academic Youth "Odrodzenie", and from 1928 to 1930 also the president of its Vilnius branch. From 1931 to 1932 he was president of the Association of Fraternal Aid at Vilnius University.

In 1931–1932 he published in the monthly Żagary. A devout Catholic, Dembiński developed a radical interpretation of Christianity and became active in left-wing causes. In 1934 he became a member of the Union of the Academic Left Front, and began to work closely with the Union of Polish Youth and the Communist Party of Poland. He was the founder and editor-in-chief of the magazine Poprostu. He also collaborated with Karta. In 1937 he joined the Polish Socialist Party. In 1937–1938 he was imprisoned after being accused of communist activities.

After the outbreak of the war and the entry of Soviet troops into Vilnius, he worked as a teacher and mostly withdrew from political activity. After the Germans took over eastern Poland, Dembiński was arrested by the Gestapo and murdered at the train station in the town of Hancewicze near Pinsk in the Belarusian SSR.
