= Kurt Hälker =

German anti-Nazi resister (1922–2010)

- Born: 2 May 1922; Duisburg, Rhine Province, Germany
- Died: 4 February 2010 (aged 87); Berlin, Germany
- Occupations: Upholsterer; President of the East German Peace Council
- Known for: Resistance activism
- Political party: PCF; KPD; SED

Kurt Hälker (2 May 1922 – 4 February 2010) was a German resistance activist against the Nazi regime. During the war he passed on to the French Resistance information which he received in the course of his work as a navy radio operator based for six months in Jersey, and subsequently in mainland France. After the war he was for many years deputy General Secretary of the East German Peace Council.

Sources sometimes identify him by the cover names he used in the course of his wartime activities. These were Robert Vidal and Hugo Erb.

== Life ==
Kurt Hälker was born into a catholic family in Duisburg during the Franco-Belgian occupation. By the time he left school the French army had left the Rhineland: he undertook and completed an apprenticeship as an upholsterer. Shortly after that, however, in 1941 he was conscripted into the army. He was sent to Paris, which had been under German occupation since the previous summer, and trained for work as a naval radio operator. Hälker had managed to live the first nineteen years without taking too much interest in political developments, and his initial reaction to being sent to Paris as a member of an army of occupation was delight that he would become a "god in France". Half a century later, in a television interview, he recalled how the daily experience of Nazi occupation, including the frequent shooting of hostages, progressively transformed "essentially unpolitical people" such as himself into committed opponents of the war.

In the autumn of 1941, he was sent on a six-month posting to Jersey and Guernsey. The German high command became convinced, from the accuracy of British bombing of military targets on the Channel Islands, that detailed information was being transmitted to the British from the islands. They were probably right. Details of resistance activity within the German forces occupying the islands are sketchy, but the radio operator Kurt Hälker was part of it. Early in 1942 the Germans sent a Corvette Captain to investigate. Hälker later recalled that when he arrived on his brief but intense intelligence gathering mission this man was the most senior German naval officer on the islands, which was eloquent testimony to the priority that the Nazi authorities attached to his mission.

After his posting in the Channel Island he returned to Cherbourg and then Paris where he was seconded to work, still as a radio operator, with the Naval General Staff. Through Hans Heisel, a junior German naval officer described in one source as a "like minded comrade", he came into contact with various exiled German resistance fighters such as Thea Saefkow. Through such links he also formed contacts during or before November 1942 with the French resistance. It has been estimated that there were around 3,000 Germans who were members of the French resistance. Most of these had been forced into exile because they were Communists or Jews (or both). Among German resistance members Kurt Hälker was unusual in that he was also a serving member of the German military machine. As a radio operator he was able to obtain militarily important information and pass it to Resistance members who were able to convey it to London. After the formation of CALPO ("Comité „Allemagne libre“ pour l'Ouest" /"National "Free Germany" Committee in the west") in September 1943 he was also involved in distributing printed anti-war material provided by the Resistance to members of the German army. He was already by this stage, with Hans Heisel and Arthur Eberhard, a member of a three-man resistance cell recently formed within the army: the cell's activities would remain undetected by the German authorities till after the Liberation of Paris in August 1944.

In the run up to the Liberation of Paris Kurt Hälker slipped away from his work with the German navy and joined the rapidly emerging French resistance force, using the cover name Robert Vidal. He was among the insurgents who defended the building occupied by the French Communist Party central committee from attacks by German troops. At around this time he became a member of the French Communist Party, till the start of 1945 acting as a German speaking representative of the CALPO on the frontline in Alsace-Lorraine where the fighting continued for several months after Paris itself had been liberated.

Starting in March 1945, together with three dozen other "German antifascists" he embarked on a training course at St. Germain-en-Laye near Paris, with the US army and the OSS (US intelligence services). "Robert Vidal" disappeared overnight and he became "Hugo Erb" of the US army. Selection resulted from an approach made by the OSS to the CALPO organisation in France. The idea was that those selected should be parachuted into Germany behind the German lines. However, it quickly became apparent that the speed of the German military collapse during the next few weeks was making Hälker's original understanding of the tasks to be undertaken out of date. Instead of being trained in close combat with fire arms and use of plastic explosives, the real objective became working to ensure that with Germany under military occupation, political developments should progress towards the right kind of democratic future according to the evolving perceptions in Washington and London. Hälker had only agreed to the training after very careful consideration, and he now took steps to withdraw from it. His withdrawal from the programme was agreed, "on medical grounds", with effect from 2 June 1945.

In July 1945 he returned to Duisburg, his home city, joined the Communist Party of Germany, and became involved in youth work. Since May 1945 the western two thirds of Germany had been divided into zones of military occupation. Duisburg was in the British military occupation zone. Two years later, still himself aged only 25, he relocated to Leipzig in the Soviet occupation zone. There are suggestions that one reason for moving may well be that since 1945 he had been repeatedly contacted by the British and American intelligence services, keen to find out more about the war time exploits of Robert Vidal and Hugo Erb. In Leipzig he pursued his studies and became a member of the Socialist Unity Party ("Sozialistische Einheitspartei Deutschlands" / SED), established through a contentious party merger in April 1946 and now well along the way to emerging, in October 1949, as the ruling party in a new kind of German one-party state. His wartime "antifascist" activities as a young man were celebrated openly and without nuance in ways which further to the west would, some felt, have been unthinkable, at least before 1990.

In East Germany, from 1950 Hälker held various positions in the peace movement and in "antifascist" organisations, both full-time and honorary. In 1976 he was appointed Deputy General Secretary of the East German Peace Council.

== Awards and honours ==
- 1979 Patriotic Order of Merit in silver
- 1982 Star of People's Friendship in silver
- 1987 Patriotic Order of Merit in gold
