= Fyodor Gavrilov =

Russian painter

- Born: 18th century
- Died: Unknown
- Known for: Portrait painting
- Notable work: Portrait of Nikita Kuzhin (1767)
- Movement: Russian portraiture

Fyodor Gavrilov was a Russian painter active in the second half of the eighteenth century. The Tver Regional Picture Gallery contains a single painting by him, a portrait of Nikita Kuzhin which it accessioned in 1950; a label formerly affixed to the back of the painting dates it to 1767. Nothing further is recorded of his career.
