= Gavrilović (company) =

Croatian meat company

- Type: Private
- Industry: Food processing
- Founded: 1821
- Founders: Gavrilović family
- Headquarters: Petrinja, Croatia
- Products: Salami, Sausage, Pâté
- Revenue: € 109.8 million (2024)
- Number of employees: 535
- Website: www.gavrilovic.hr

Gavrilović is a Croatian food processing company specializing in meats such as sausages and salami. The company is based in Petrinja, Croatia and can trace its history there as far back as 1690.

== History ==
The precursor to the modern company began in 1690, when Ivan and Petar Gavrilović began a craft of selling meat in Petrinja. During 1775, the family of Gavrilović are mentioned as one of the founders of the butcher's guild, and at the beginning of the 19th century, they are referenced as the main supplier of Napoleon's army. The company itself was founded in 1821, being granted the concession for manufacture to supply the barracks of the Croatian Military Frontier, and its existing processes were expanded. In 1883, it began producing its trademark winter salami variously known as hrvatska salama or gavrilovićka. It operated as a family company under the name "Mate Gavrilović i drug", renamed in 1889 as "Prva hrvatska tvornica salame, sušena mesa i masti" with about 50 employees. It was eventually incorporated as a limited liability company (d.o.o) during its modernization process in 1902 and began exporting its products to other countries such as Hungary, Switzerland, Germany, Palestine and Egypt.

After two decades, it began producing canned food and prepared food and following its nationalization after World War II by the Communist authorities of Yugoslavia, it was again renamed to "Gavrilović". By then it grew into a company employing 4500 people, opening its first shops in Zagreb and exporting to France, Italy, Czechoslovakia, England and Austria. During the 60s, it also began exporting to the United States. In 1991, the company was given back to Đuro (Georg) Gavrilović.

In 2005, the Gavrilovic Association of Former Workers, just under 2,000, filed a lawsuit against Croatia at the European Court of Human Rights in Strasbourg. The court accepted the lawsuit, and the former employees ask the Court to annul the decision of the Constitutional Court of Croatia (number: U.III.2768 / 2002) of 30 June 2004, as well as the decisions and rulings that preceded it. According to the lawsuit, the Constitutional Court of Croatia, by its decision, "violated the provisions of the Constitution of Croatia to their detriment." Namely: the provisions of Article 3 on the inviolability of property, Article 14 on the equality of citizens before the law, Article 19 which specifies that "individual acts of state administration and bodies with public authority must be based on law", and the provisions of Article 48 of the Constitution guaranteeing the right of ownership. If the Court in Strasbourg rules in favor of the former workers, ie against Croatia, then the "Gavrilović" case will return to the beginning, more precisely to the situation that existed in 1991 when Đuro (Georg) Gavrilović, with political and judicial support, started the operation. According to the Association, the illegal takeover of what was once one of the largest meat industries in Europe.

The company suffered damage during the 2020 Petrinja earthquake, but resumed its production regularly shortly afterwards.

== Jelica ==
The company's trademark logo, depicting the three-year-old girl Jelica Cekuš (cousin of Đuro Gavrilović senior) holding a winter salami, was designed by Croatian comic book author and illustrator Andrija Maurović in 1931.
