= Asen Gavrilov =

Bulgarian ballet dancer and choreographer

Asen Gavrilov (Bulgarian: Асен Гаврилов; 10 June 1926 – 21 May 2006) was a Bulgarian ballet dancer and choreographer.

== Biography ==
Gavrilov was born in Sofia in 1926. He was born in the Ivan Vazov National Theatre. His father was a stage worker there, and as Gavrilov lived in a small apartment with three siblings and his parents, he often preferred to study and sleep at the theatre. He often watched rehearsals. In 1944, he enlisted as a German construction laborer to earn money, which marked him as a German soldier. Because of this, he was sent to the Bogdanovdol forced labor camp later that year after the Red Army entered Bulgaria.

In 1946, Gavrilov began ballet at the unusually late age of twenty years old. The National Opera and Ballet of Bulgaria made use of the National Theater after theirs burned down, and Gavrilov became very fond of one of the ballerinas he watched rehearsing. In hopes of catching her attention, he went to the ballet master, Anastas Petrov, and asked to enroll in his school. Petrov found him naturally talented and accepted him as a student.

He danced his first role in 1947, Vaslav from The Fountain of Bakhchisarai. In 1948, he was offered his first main role as Albert in Giselle, and after his performance, he was appointed first soloist.

In 1950, he was sent to study ballet further in Leningrad, and at the end of his studies, he played Désiré in The Sleeping Beauty at the Mariinsky Theatre. He was invited to remain there as a soloist but decided to return to Bulgaria.

In 1951, he was one of several soloists for a staging of The Red Poppy by the National Opera and Ballet in East Berlin. One of the other soloists, Zhivko Bisserov, attempted to escape to West Berlin but was caught and expelled from the National Opera and Ballet. Gavrilov was told to learn his role but protested on behalf of Bisserov, who was then able to continue dancing at the Varna Opera. However, Gavrilov was once against sent to Leningrad.

He returned to Bulgaria in 1952. After his return, he continued dancing and also began working as a ballet master, choreographer, and teacher; for example, he played a main role in and later staged the ballet "Haidouk Song" by Alexander Raichev.

Gavrilov was most renowned for his role as Phoebe in La Esmeralda.

He received the Order of Saints Cyril and Methodius, 1st class, in 1959, and the award of People's Artist in 1965 for his contributions to Bulgarian culture. He died on 21 May 2006.
