= Elvira Paterson =

Ukrainian businesswoman (born 1989)

- Ельвіра Патерсон-Гаврилова
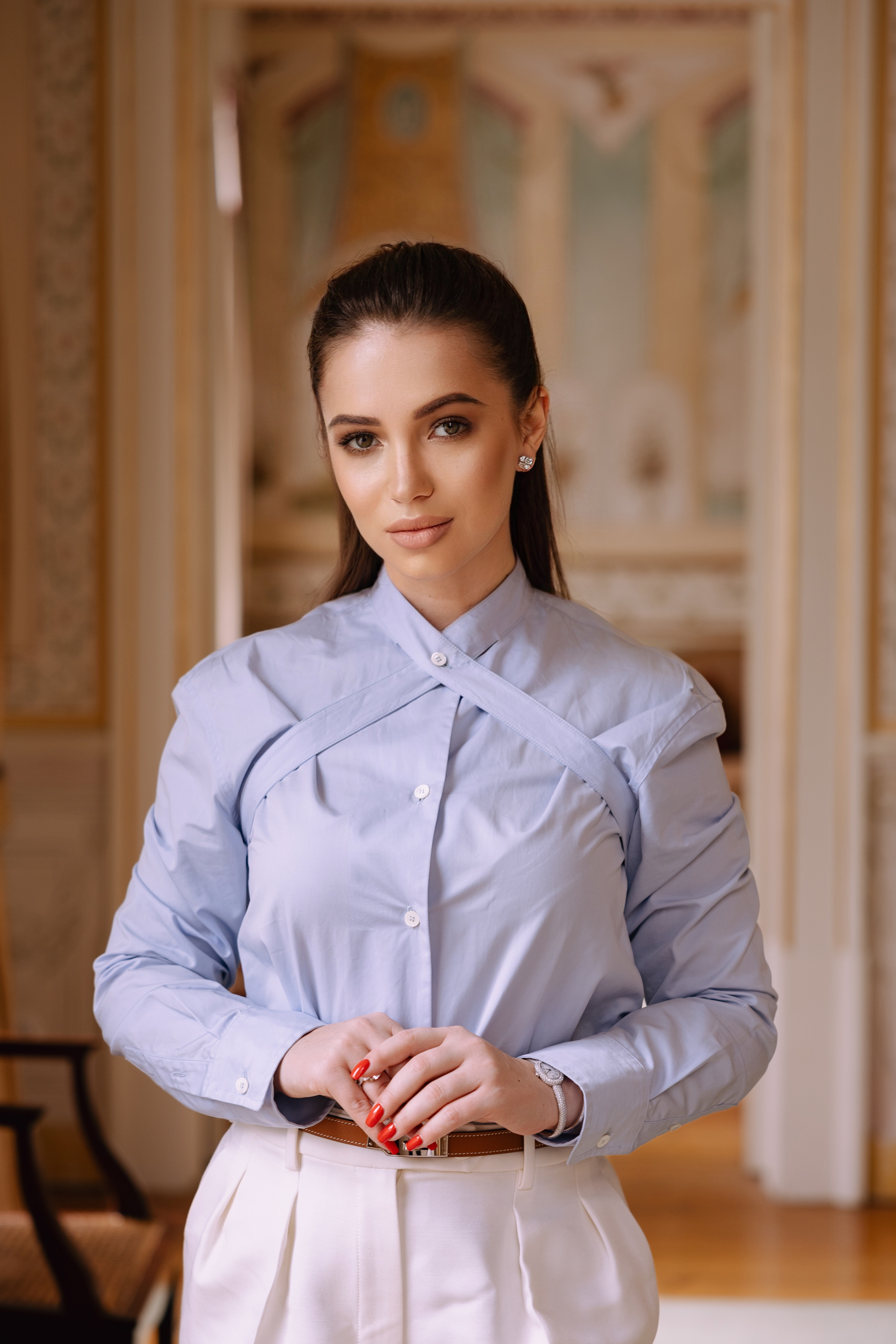
- Born: March 26, 1989 (age 37); Ukraine
- Other name: Elvira Gavrilova
- Occupations: Businesswoman, entrepreneur, film producer, philanthropist
- Years active: 2018–present
- Organization(s): iHaven, SpaceSat, Elledgy Media Group, Paterson Foundation
- Known for: Founder of iHaven, SpaceSat, Elledgy Media Group; organizing Forbes galas; producing films including Holiguards and Superpower
- Notable work: Holiguards (2024–2025), Superpower (2023), The Wall Street Hotel Incident (2021)
- Website: elviragavrilova.com

Elvira Paterson (also known as Elvira Havrylova, Ukrainian: Ельвіра Гаврилова) (born March 26, 1989) is a Ukrainian businesswoman who runs the public relations firm Elledgy Media Group. She also co-owned Amillidius, which was dissolved in 2022 amid media reports that it was extorting its clients. After dissolving Amillidius, she moved to Portugal and changed her last name from Gavrilova to Paterson.

Elledgy, which has been investigated by Portuguese authorities for money laundering, has worked with Russian crypto fraudster Vladimir Okhotnikov.

== Career ==
Paterson is the founder, CEO, and strategic lead of Elledgy Media Group.

In 2018, her first production project, Top-100 Pride of Ukraine, was launched. Elledgy Media Group produced the 2021 short film The Wall Street Hotel Incident with Eric Roberts, shortlisted for the Cannes Film Festival. In 2024–2025, Elledgy Media Group was a producer of the fantasy action feature film Holiguards, starring Kevin Spacey, Dolph Lundgren, Tyrese Gibson, and Eric Roberts. In 2023, Paterson was an executive producer on Sean Penn's documentary about Volodymyr Zelenskyy, Superpower.

Paterson has also founded the companies iHaven and SpaceSat.

== Personal life ==
Paterson was married to Ukrainian businessman Andrey Gerasimov. They divorced in 2023. According to ICIJ.org, as of January 2026 an elite unit of Portugal’s Public Prosecutor’s Office is taking over a money laundering probe into Elvira Gavrilova Paterson, the Ukrainian producer of an upcoming Kevin Spacey film and associate of accused crypto fraudster Vladimir Okhotnikov, whose activities were exposed by the International Consortium of Investigative Journalists’ Coin Laundry investigation.

The Central Department of Investigation and Penal Action, which handles complex crimes, will assume control of the criminal inquiry launched last year after two Portuguese banks flagged unusual financial movements in Gavrilova’s accounts, including a cash deposit of about $312,000, according to ICIJ partner Expresso.

ICIJ found that, in 2024 and 2025, Gavrilova, through her public relations firm Elledgy Media, organized star-studded events around the world to promote Okhotnikov’s start-ups — a series of allegedly fraudulent crypto investment schemes that have received around $1 billion from millions of unsuspecting investors. She is currently based in Portugal.

Okhotnikov, a Russian crypto entrepreneur who co-produced, co-wrote and starred in Spacey’s film, “Holiguards Saga — The Portal of Force,” resides in the United Arab Emirates, where he fled while facing criminal charges from U.S. and Georgian authorities.
