= Gavriil =

Gavriil is a variant of the name Gabriel and may refer to:

- Gavriil Abramovich Ilizarov (1921–1992), Soviet physician
- Gavriil Adrianovich Tikhov (1875–1960), Belarusian astronomer
- Gavriil Baranovsky (1860–1920), Russian architect, civil engineer, art historian and publisher
- Gavriil Beljagin (1870–1936), Russian-Estonian politician, former mayor of Reval (now Tallinn, Estonia)
- Gavriil Belostoksky (1684–1690), child saint in the Russian Orthodox Church
- Gavriil Callimachi (1689–1786), monk at Putna Monastery who became Metropolitan of Moldavia
- Gavriil Gorelov (1880–1966), Russian painter
- Gavriil Ivanovich Golovkin (1660–1734), Russian statesman
- Gavriil Kachalin (1911–1995), Soviet/Russian football player and coach
- Gavriil Kharitonovich Popov (born 1936), Russian politician and economist
- Gavriil Munteanu (1812–1869), Romanian scientist and translator
- Gavriil Musicescu (1847–1903), Romanian composer, conductor and musicologist
- Gavriil Nikolayevich Popov (1904–1972), Soviet-era Russian composer
- Gavriil Pribylov (died 1796), Russian navigator who discovered St. George Island and St. Paul Island
- Gavriil Veresov (1912–1979), Soviet chess player
- Gavriil Zhukov (1899-1957) Soviet naval commander during World War II

== See also ==
- Gavril
- Gavrila
- Gavrilo
