= Gavrila Törok =

Romanian water polo player

Personal information
- Nationality: Romanian
- Born: 7 May 1919; Timișoara, Romania

Sport
- Sport: Water polo

Gavrila Törok (born 7 May 1919, date of death unknown) was a Romanian water polo player. He competed in the men's tournament at the 1952 Summer Olympics.
