= Aleksander Weintraub =

Polish poet and writer

Aleksander Weintraub (pen name Aleksander Dan; 6 January 1897 – 1943) was a Polish poet and writer born to a Jewish family from Lwów. In the 1930s, he published in the Lwów magazine Sygnaly (Signals) and other leftist papers. He was closely associated with the Polish Communist Party. In 1935, he was an initiator of the formation, and later a member, of the Congress of Cultural Workers, associated with the party. For his communist activism he was arrested in 1937 and imprisoned for two years. After the Soviets occupied Lwów he became one of the leading members of the collaborationist newspaper Czerwony Sztandar ("The Red Flag"), writing mostly on cultural matters. In 1943, he was murdered by the German Nazis, either in Lwów, or in the Belzec concentration camp.
