= Stepan Tudor =

Ukrainian writer and activist (1892–1941)

- Степа́н Йо́сипович Ту́дор
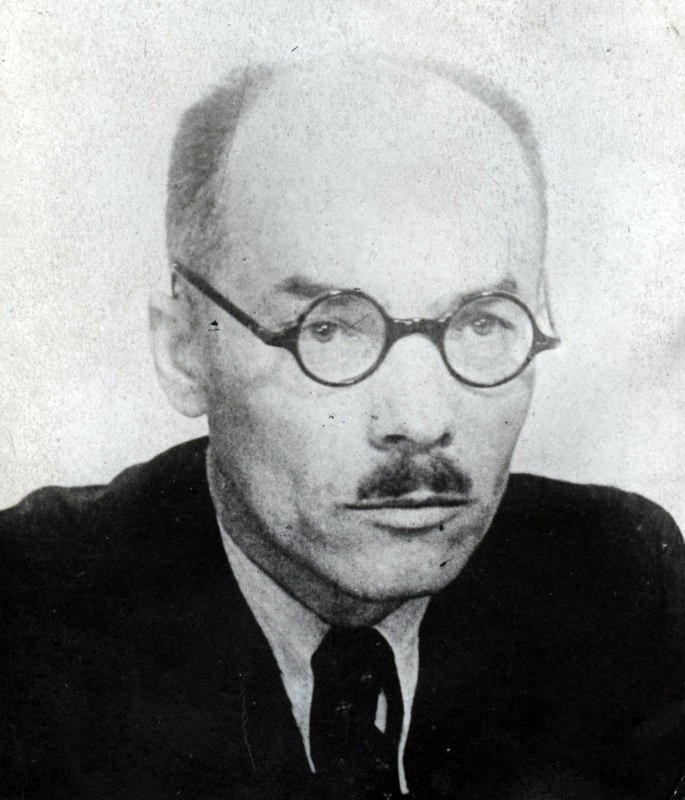
- Born: Stepan Yosypovych Oleksyuk; 25 August 1892; Ponykva, Kingdom of Galicia and Lodomeria, Austria-Hungary
- Died: 22 June 1941 (aged 48); Lviv, Ukrainian SSR, Soviet Union (now Ukraine)
- Resting place: Lychakiv Cemetery
- Education: University of Lviv
- Occupations: Writer, publicist, essayist, philosopher
- Writing career
- Language: Ukrainian

Stepan Yosypovych Tudor (Ukrainian: Степа́н Йо́сипович Ту́дор, real name Oleksyuk: Олексю́к; 25 August 1892 – 22 June 1941) was a Ukrainian writer, journalist, communist activist and doctor of philosophy.

== Biography ==
Stepan Oleksyuk was born on August 25, 1892, in a priestly family. From an early age, he experienced financial hardship and became a worker when he was a child. In 1914, while a first-year student at Lviv University, he was mobilized to join the Austro-Hungarian army. At the front, he was captured by the Russians, which caused him to stay in Dnieper, Ukraine. A participant in the Civil War in Ukraine on the Bolshevik side, he fought in the Korsun Revolutionary Brigade, then an organizer of cooperatives, and a worker in the education sector.

Returning to Galicia in 1923, he actively promoted the ideas of Marxism and became active in the pro-Soviet communist movement. He graduated from the philosophy faculty of Lviv University and worked as a teacher in Chortkiv but was constantly in conflict with the authorities for his communist activities. From 1927, he dedicated his career to literature. He was one of the organizers of the magazine, "Vikna", a body of left-wing Lviv writers, later uniting and forming the Gorno group.

He received his doctorate in philosophy in 1932. After Vikna was closed in 1932 by Polish authorities, he was exiled to Zolochiv where he lived until 1939 but continued his clandestine communist activities. Tudor was one of the main organisers and participants of the Lviv Anti-Fascist Congress of Cultural Workers in 1936.

After the Soviet invasion of Poland in September 1939, he headed the revolutionary committee where he distributed land among the peasants. Then he was temporary involved in the administration of the city, was elected a member of the People's Assembly of Western Ukraine and welcomed the annexation of Western Ukraine to the Ukrainian SSR. Following the annexation, Tudor held multiple positions as a literary official. He became an associate professor at Lvov University, a member of the board of the Lvov department of the Union of Writers of Ukraine and the head of the Lvov branch of the Institute of Literature of the Academy of Sciences of the Ukrainian SSR.

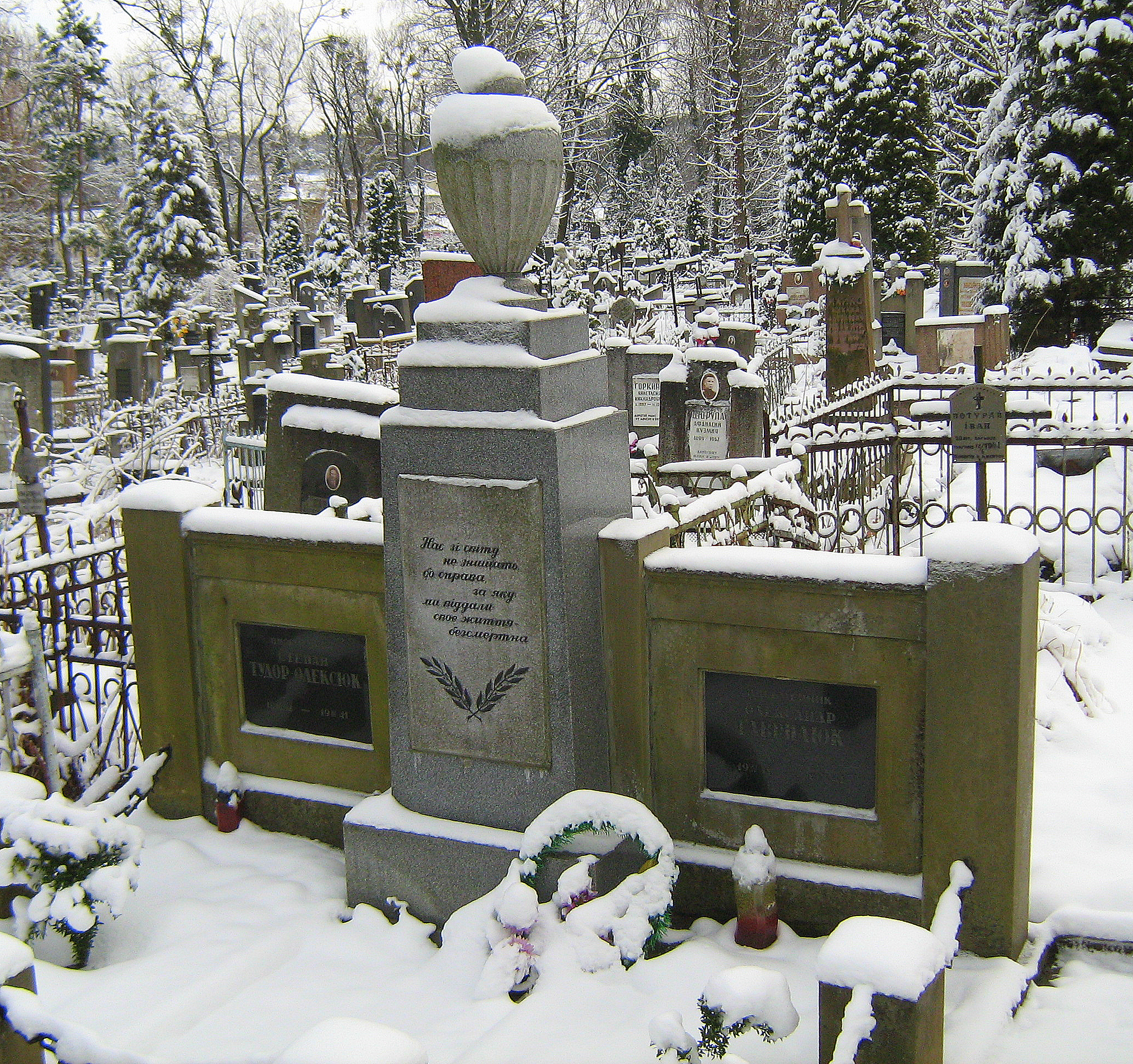
The grave of Stepan Tudor and Oleksandr Havryliuk at the Lychakiv Cemetery

On the first day of the Nazi German invasion of the Soviet Union on June 22, 1941, Tudor was killed together with his wife and a group of Galician writers, most notably his friend Oleksandr Havrylyuk, in Lviv from a bomb by a German air raid.

Stepan Tudor was buried at the Lychakiv cemetery, next to Oleksandr Havrylyuk.

== Works ==
During his sixteen years of literary activity, Tudor wrote more than 70 works, among them poetry, short stories, novels, essays, literary-critical, philosophical and journalistic articles. He began to be published in 1925 (mainly in the left-wing press).

Among his most notable works are the prose collection "Birth" (1929), the short story "Moloshne bezhevillya" (1930) and the philosophyical and satirical novel-pamphlet " Soyka's Father's Day" (1932–1941) which was highly valued in Soviet literature, directed against the Greek-Catholic clergy in Galicia.

Under the leadership of the founder of the Lviv-Warsaw School, Kazimierz Twardowski, he published a number of philosophical works (in particular, the doctoral dissertation "On the so-called observational judgment. Research on the psychology of cognition", defended in 1932), which were influenced by analytical and positivist philosophy.

== Memory ==
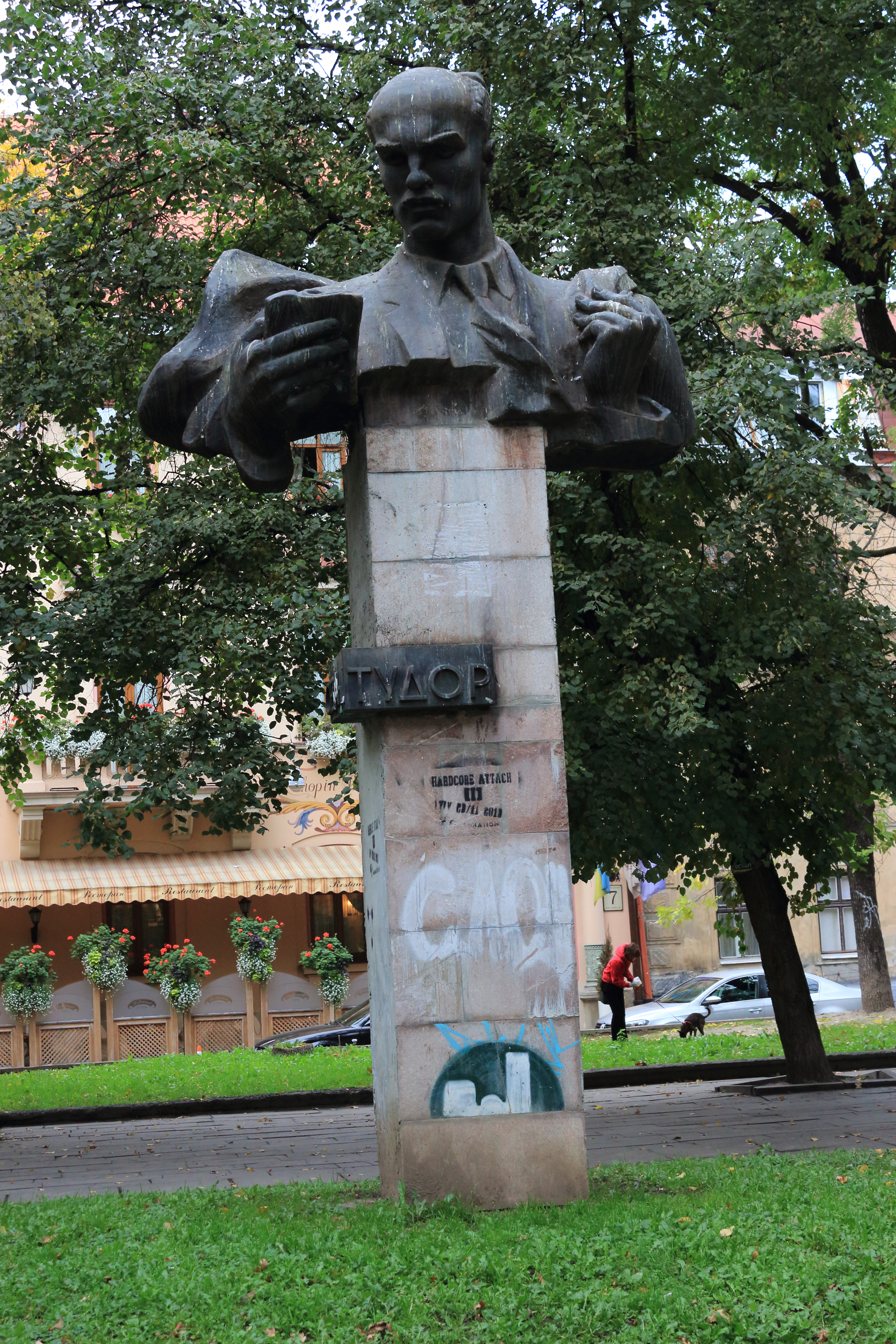
Monument to Stepan Tudor in Lviv (dismantled)

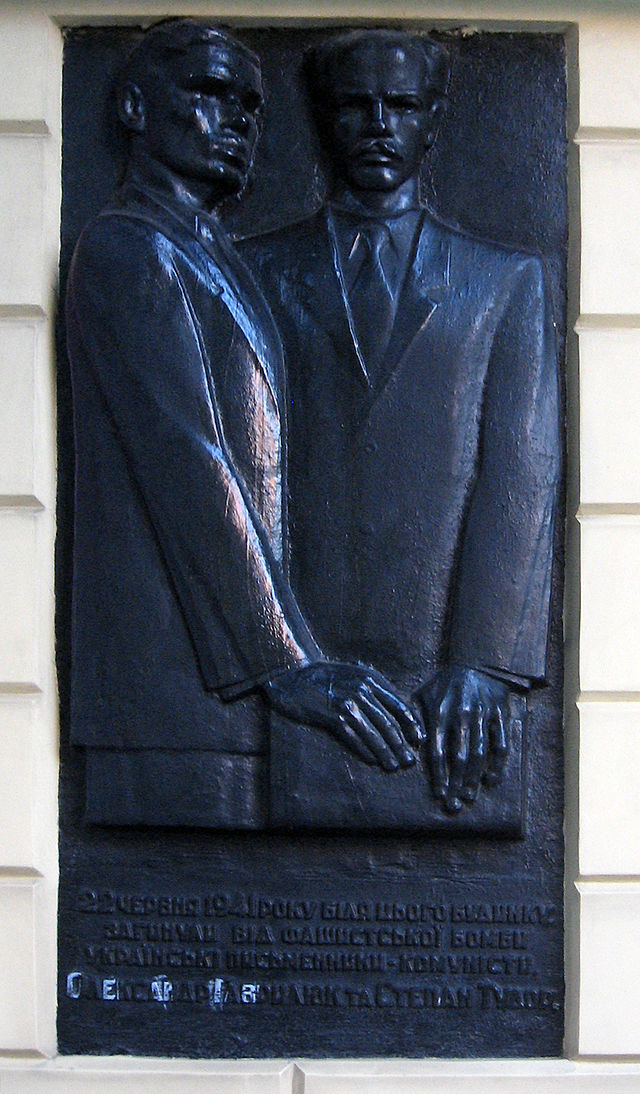
Memorial plaque to Stepan Tudor and Oleksandr Havryliuk at the place of their death on Doroshenko Street (dismantled)

A number streets in Ukraine were named after Stepan Tudor during the Soviet era, most of which have been renamed. In 1962, a memorial plaque was installed at a building on Lvivska Street in Zolochiv, where the writer lived from 1931 to 1939.

On June 22, 1971 (on the 30th anniversary of the writer's death), a memorial plaque was installed at the building in Lviv, near which Tudor died.

In 1980, a monument was built in his honor in the city of Lviv.

=== Vandalisation and removal of monuments ===
In April 2014, a scandal broke out in Lviv when the flower shop in the place where the Tudor died in 1941, hung an advertising banner above the memorial plaque installed on the house. After the reaction of the local authorities for the protection of the cultural environment, the advertisement was dismantled. The owners of the store explained that they were forced to take such a step in connection with frequent cases of anti-communist vandalism. In accordance with Ukraine's de-communization laws, the memorial plaque was removed on May 6, 2016, by the authorities.

On May 9, 2016, about forty Ukrainian nationalists from the organizations Right Sector, the OUN and Azov battalions and multiple other far right organisations wanted to demolish the monument of Stepan Tudor in Lviv, but were dispersed by the police. Criminal proceedings were opened on the grounds of a crime of group hooliganism. According to Ukrainian Institute of National Memory, the monument to Stepan Tudor was not subject to the decommunization law and two of the activists were detained by the police.

On September 7, 2016, the Tudor monument was dismantled by the city administration and was transferred to the Borys Voznytsky Lviv National Art Gallery.
