= Oleksandr Havryliuk =

Ukrainian writer and activist

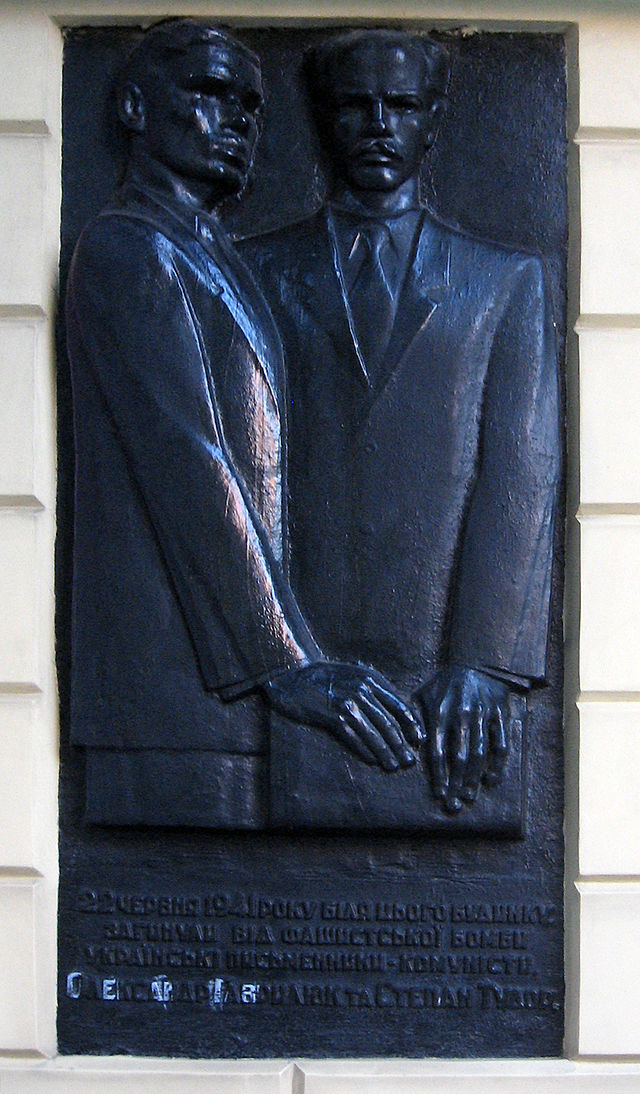
Memorial plaque to Stepan Tudor and Oleksandr Havryliuk at the place of their death on Doroshenko Street (dismantled)

Oleksandr Yakymovych Havryliuk (Ukrainian: Олександр Якимович Гаврилюк; 23 April 1911 – 22 June 1941) was a Ukrainian writer and communist activist.

== Biography ==
Havryliuk was born into a peasant family. He soon became an active participant in the communist underground in the Western Belarusian and Western Ukrainian lands. In 1929 he joined the Communist Party of Western Belarus and became secretary of its county committee. He began his literary activity in 1929.

He worked in the underground newspaper of the Central Committee of the Communist Party of Western Ukraine in Lviv. He was a member of the Gorno (Group of West Ukrainian proletarian writers), which included writers Yaroslav Halan and Stepan Tudor. He was one of the organizers and participants of the Anti-Fascist Congress of Cultural Figures in 1936 in Lviv.

During the period between 1929 and 1939, he was arrested 14 times by the Polish police, and was held twice in the Bereza Kartuska concentration camp, from which he was liberated by the Red Army in September 1939.

From 1940 he was a member of the Union of Soviet Writers of Ukraine, director of the Lviv branch of the Literary Fund.

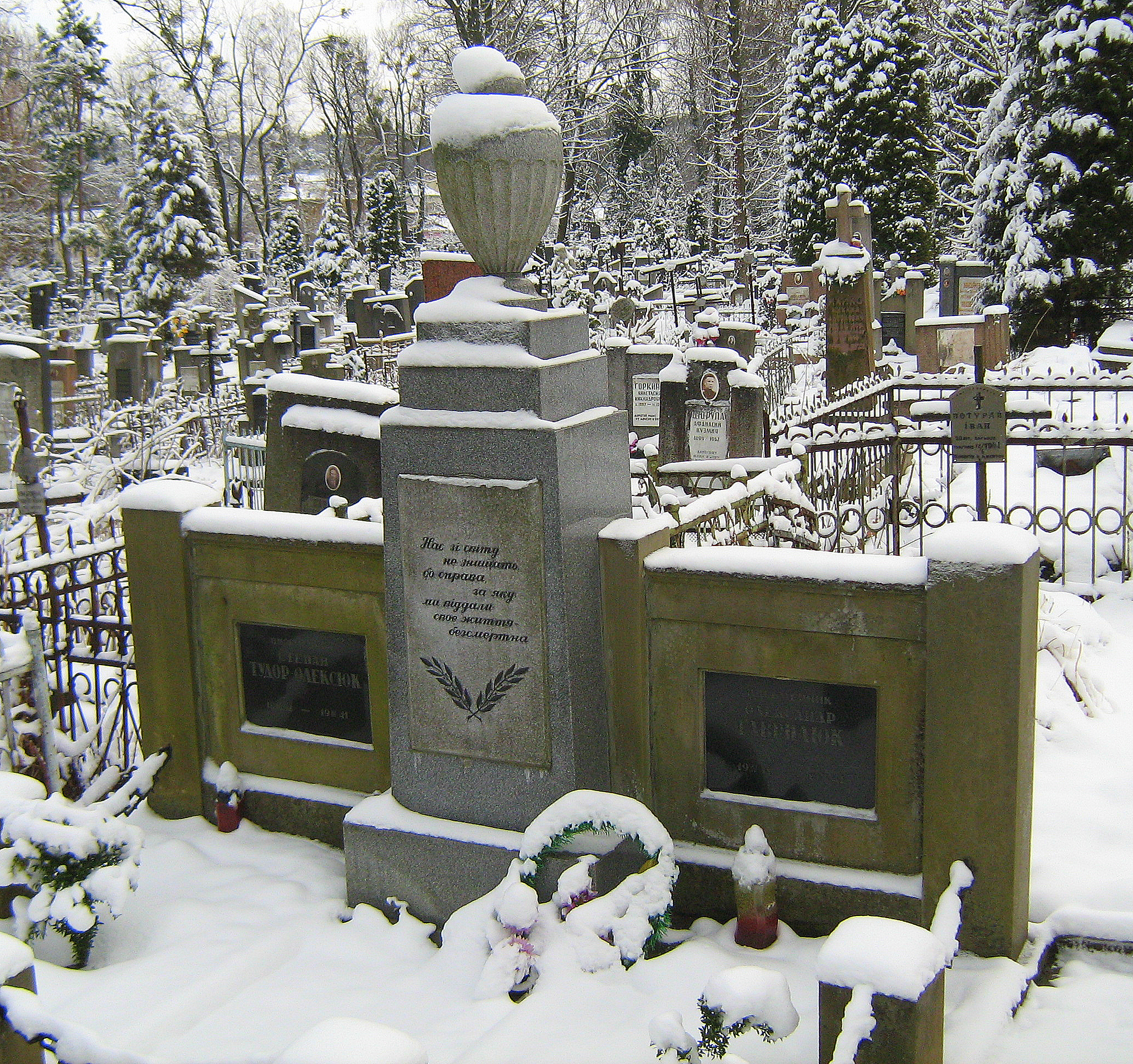
The grave of Stepan Tudor and Oleksandr Havryliuk at the Lychakiv Cemetery

Havryliuk died along with Stepan Tudor on the first day of the German invasion of the Soviet Union in Lviv from an accidental hit by a German air bomb. In 1957, a street was named after him in Kiev.

He was buried at the Lychakiv cemetery in the same grave with Stepan Tudor.
