= Gavrilo =

- Gender: Masculine

Origin
- Origin: Gabriel, from Hebrew, through Greek
- Meaning: "Able-bodied one of God"; or "messenger of God"

Other names
- Related names: diminutives Gaša, Gavro and Gajo

Gavrilo (Serbian Cyrillic: Гаврило) is a predominantly Serbian male given name, also found scarcely in other Slavic languages, being a variant of the biblical name Gabriel. In particular, it is a Russian vernacular form of the given name Gavriil.

Notable people with the name include.

- Serbian Patriarch Gavrilo I, Serbian Patriarch (1648-1655)
- Serbian Patriarch Gavrilo II, Serbian Patriarch (1752)
- Serbian Patriarch Gavrilo III, Serbian Patriarch (1752-1755)
- Serbian Patriarch Gavrilo IV, Serbian Patriarch (1758)
- Serbian Patriarch Gavrilo V (1881-1950), Serbian Patriarch
- Gavrilo Princip (1894–1918), Bosnian Serb revolutionary, assassin of Archduke Franz Ferdinand of Austria
- Gavrilo Lesnovski (Middle Ages), hermit
- Gavrilo Kratovac, prota in Hilandar and translator from Greek to Serbian
- Gavrilo Rodić (1812–1890), Austrian general
- Gavrilo Vitković (1829–1902), Serbian professor, engineer, and historian
- Gavrilo Martsenkovich (18th century), Russian opera actor and singer

== See also ==
- Gavrilović
