= Socialist realism in Poland =

Soviet cultural doctrine in Poland

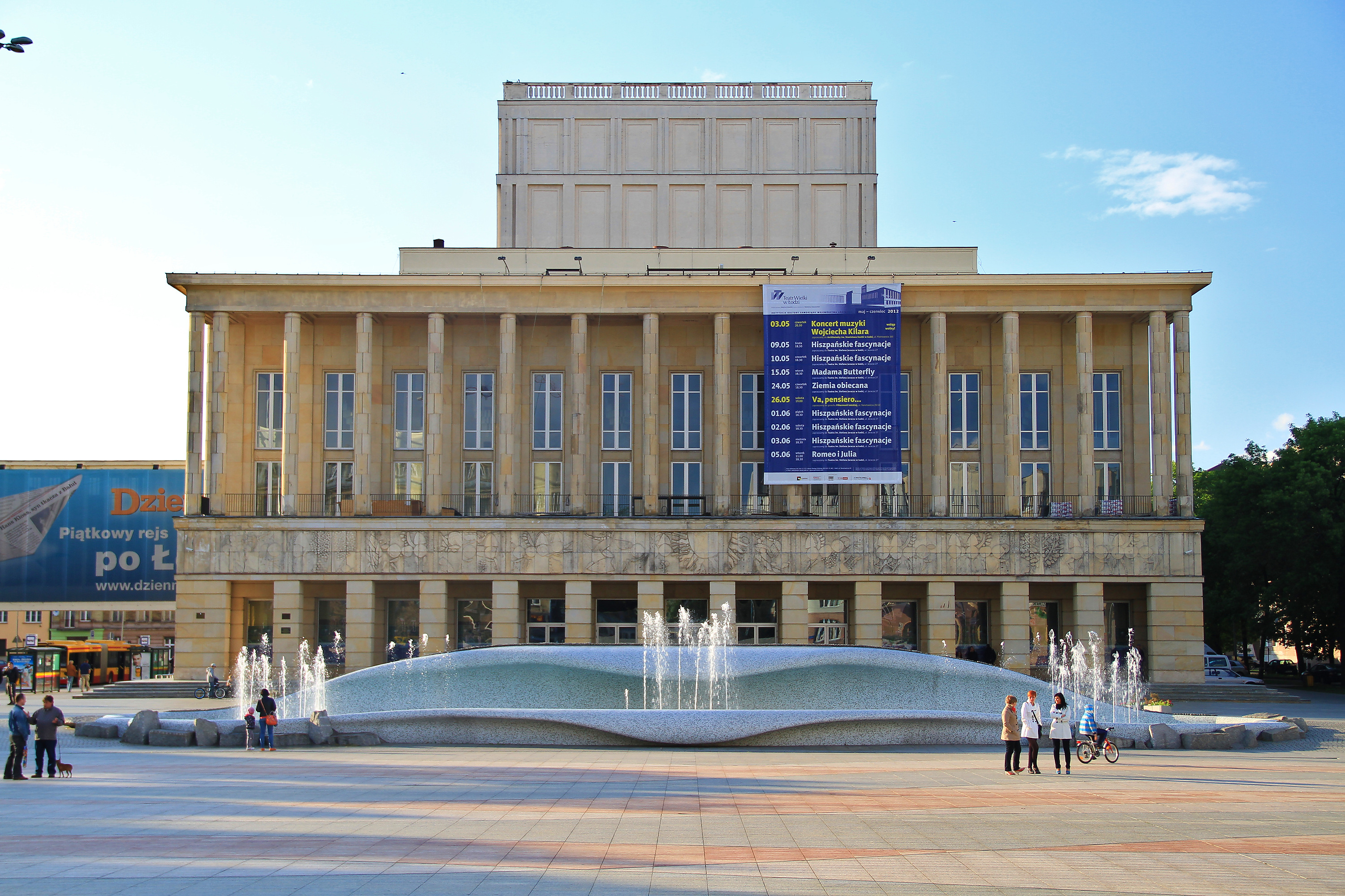
- Grand Theatre, Łódź

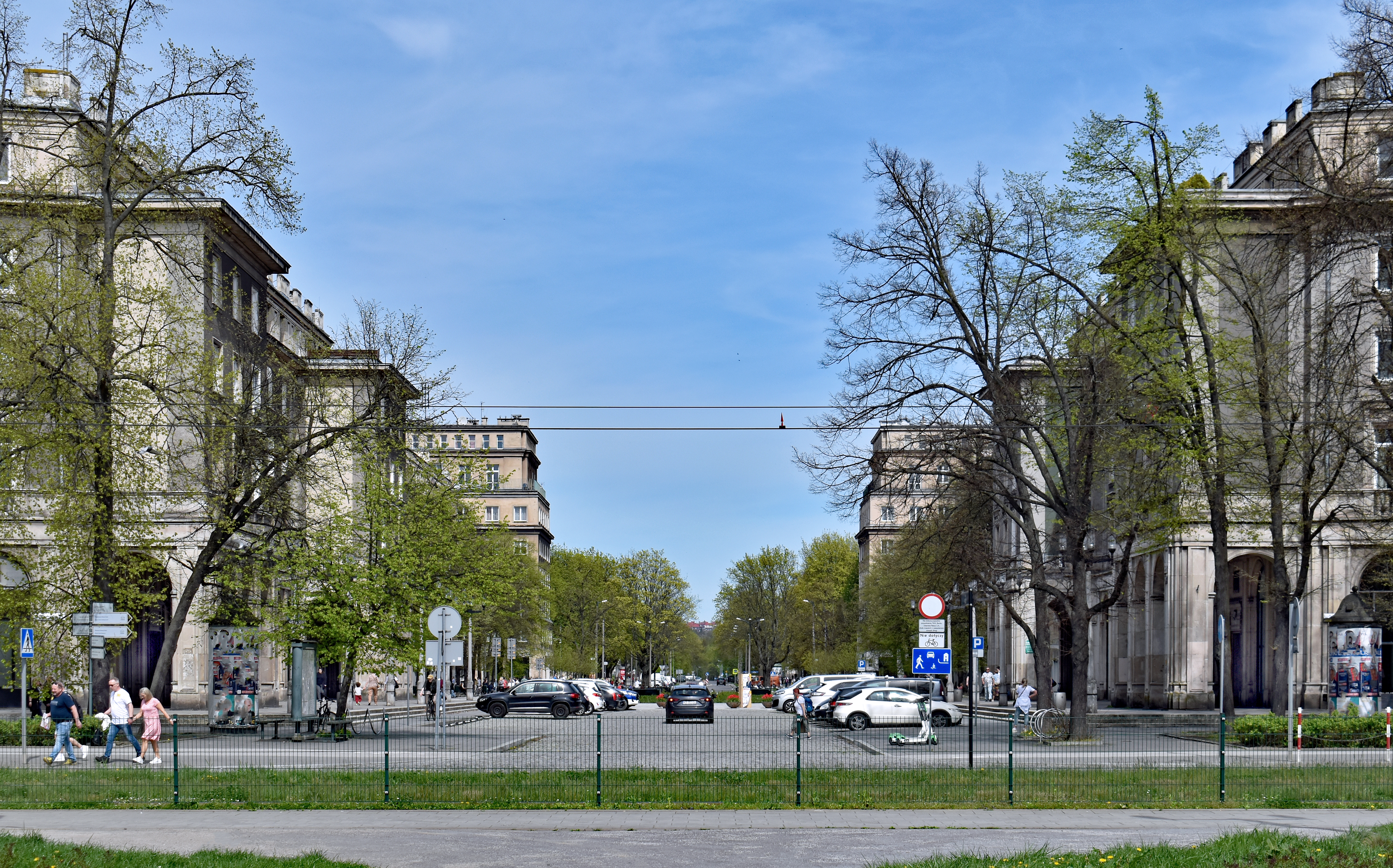
- Socrealist centre of Nowa Huta district of Kraków, Aleja Róż (Avenue of Roses)

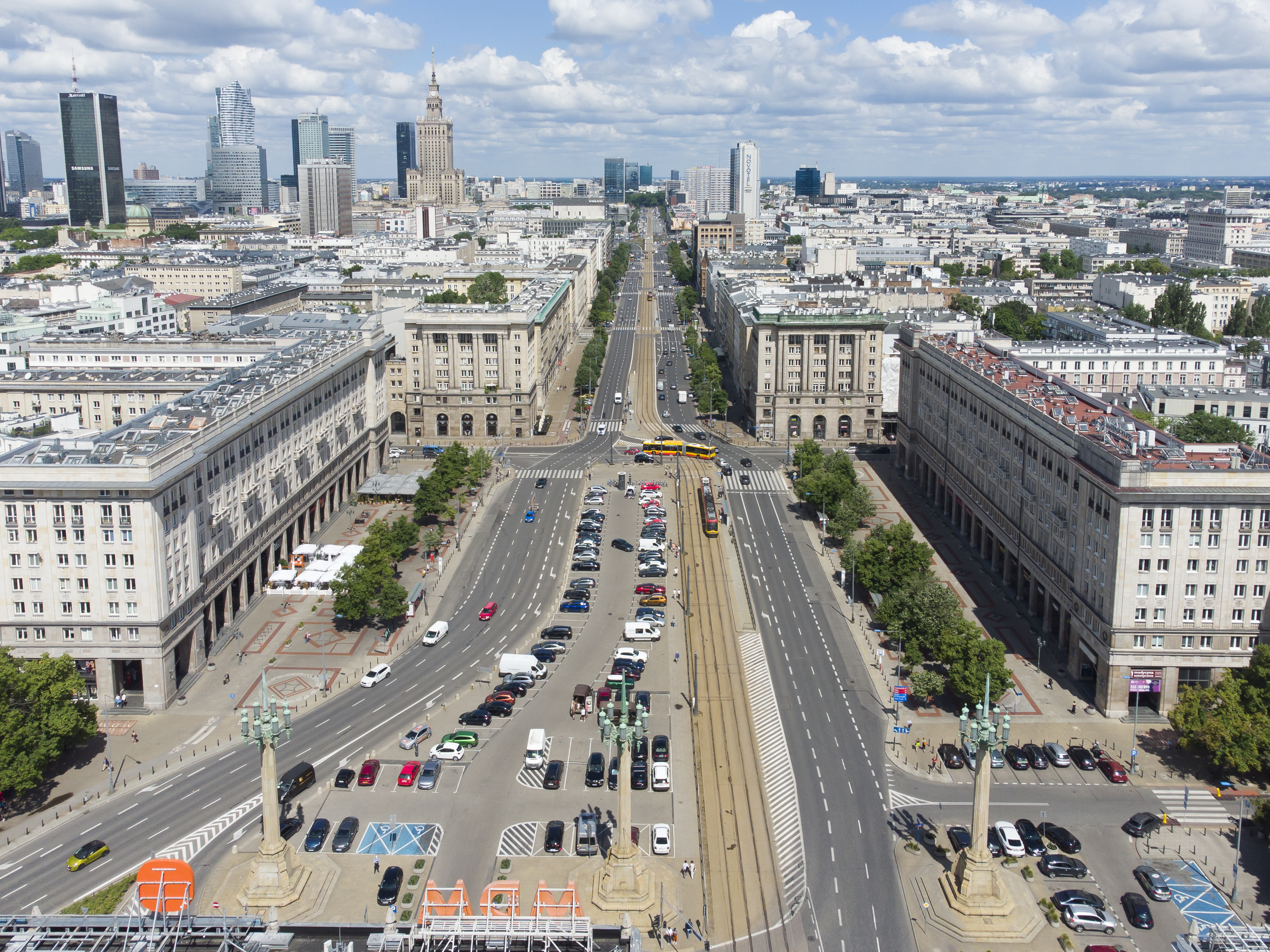
- Plac Konstytucji in Warsaw

Socialist realism in Poland (Polish: socrealizm, a portmanteau of the Polish words for socialism and realism) was a socio-political and aesthetic doctrine sanctioned by the pro-Soviet government of the post-war Polish People’s Republic during its campaign of Stalinization. The policy prescribing its use for institutional aesthetics was introduced in 1949 by decree of the Polish United Workers' Party minister Włodzimierz Sokorski, who would later become, Minister of Culture and Art. As in all Eastern Bloc countries in the Soviet sphere of influence, Socialist realism was utilized by the State as an instrument in the social engineering of Polish society and labour culture. However, this trend never became truly dominant. Following Stalin's death, and especially from 1953 on, the Polish government increasingly considered critical of its public arts policies. Finally, as part of the Gomułka political thaw from within the Polish United Workers' Party, the entire doctrine was abandoned by 1956. Following Bierut's death on March 12, 1956, and the subsequent de-Stalinization of all People's Republics, Polish artists, writers and architects started abandoning it.

== Local characteristics ==
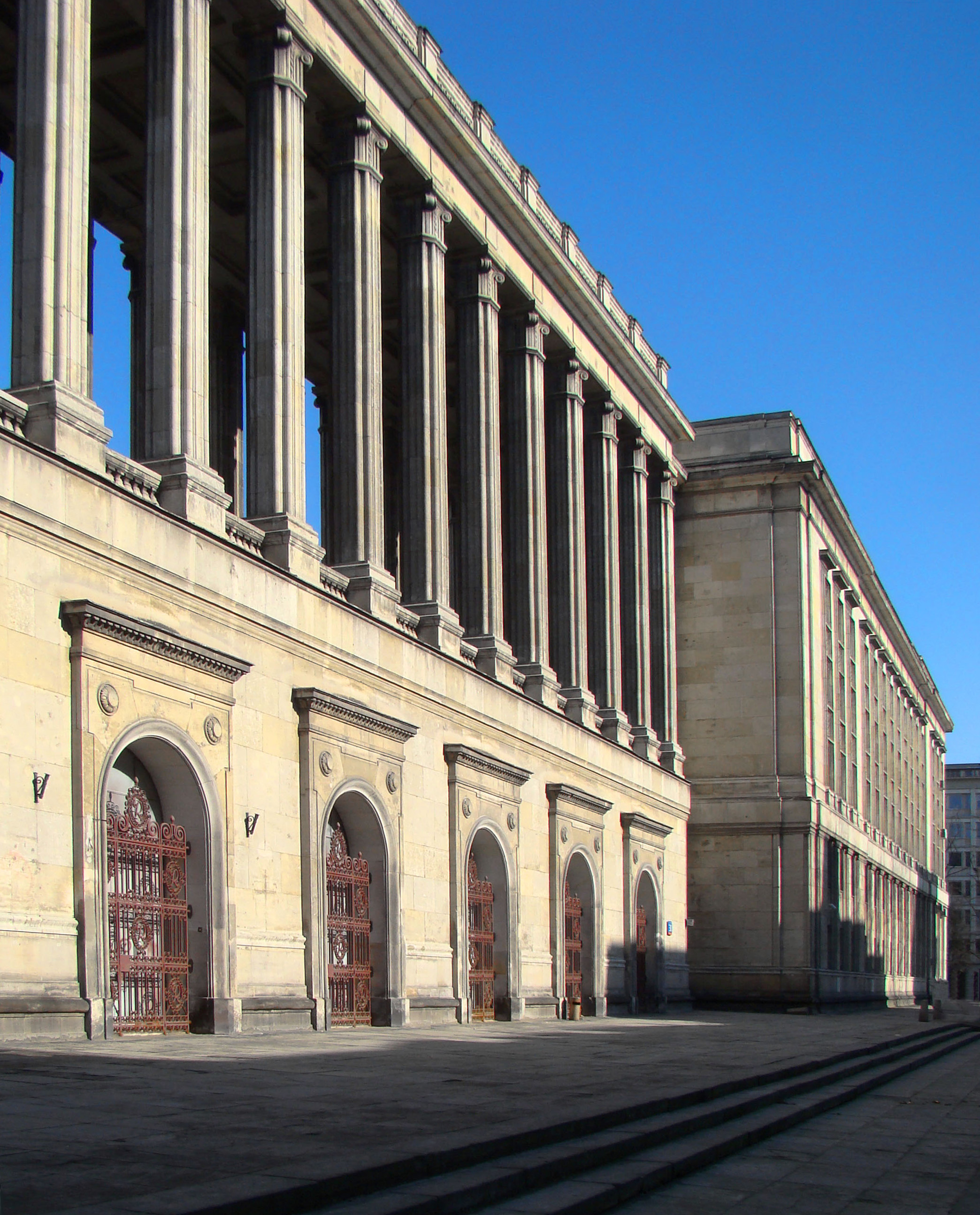
Ministry of Agriculture, Warsaw, built 1953–1956

Since the style of the Renaissance was generally regarded as the most revered in old Polish architecture, it was to become Poland's socialist national format. However, in the course of incorporating these principles into new ideology, major changes were also introduced. One of these was to more closely reflect Soviet architecture, which resulted in the majority of new buildings blending into one another. The all-encompassing Stalinist vision propagated by the Soviet Union was best exemplified by the new Joseph Stalin Palace of Culture and Science (Pałac Kultury i Nauki imienia Józefa Stalina) constructed in Warsaw between 1952 and 1955. Its design was based on similar skyscrapers built in the USSR at that time. The 3,500 builders were brought in directly from the Soviet Union with their own blueprints, and housed in a suburban shantytown. According to the party’s official doctrine, the architecture of that era was to be “national in form and socialist in content”. This requirement posed difficulties when designing buildings in the former German territories that were incorporated into Poland after 1945 (e.g. in Wrocław).

== Painting and sculpture ==
"Manifesto" by Wojciech Weiss, 1950

Socialist realism in Polish art was confined to portraits of party leaders and various depictions of muscular labourers and battle scenes, with special attention paid to popular taste. Formally inspired by Neoclassicism as well as the local folk art, socrealism served strictly political and pro-Soviet propaganda purposes; however, its most notable artists, such as Wojciech Weiss and Włodzimierz Zakrzewski were educated before Stalinism and inadvertently adhered to traditional Western techniques and technologies. Some of the most blatantly socrealist paintings were: "Pass-on the brick" (Podaj cegłę) pictured here, by Aleksander Kobzdej, and "Thank you tractor operator" (Podziękowanie traktorzyście) pictured here, as well as "Comrade Bierut among labourers" (Towarzysz Bierut wśród robotników) by Helena and Juliusz Krajewski.

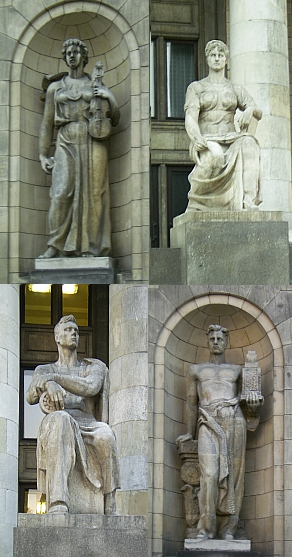
Socialist-Realist allegories surrounding the Palace of Culture and Science in Warsaw

In sculpture, there was a trend toward stone-carved allegories elevating the common worker, used mainly for architectural purposes, such as those surrounding the Palace of Culture and Science in Warsaw, including mostly plaster busts of communist apparatchiks. The collection of Polish socrealist sculpture is exhibited at Kozłówka Palace near Lubartów.

== Literature ==
Socialist realism was a considerably short period in the history of Polish literature marked by public fear caused by the gross abuses of power by state security forces. The policy was introduced during the Polish Writers' Union's 4th Congress, which took place in Szczecin from 20th to 22 January 1949. Leon Kruczkowski became the president of the union, and Jarosław Iwaszkiewicz and Ewa Szelburg-Zarembina were vice-presidents. Many poets and writers of famous names were involved in praising the construction of socialism: Jerzy Andrzejewski, Tadeusz Borowski, Władysław Broniewski, Mieczysław Jastrun, Tadeusz Konwicki, Stanisław Jerzy Lec, Sławomir Mrożek, Zofia Nałkowska, Igor Newerly, Julian Przyboś, Jerzy Putrament, Wisława Szymborska, Julian Tuwim, Adam Ważyk and Stanisław Wygodzki. The center of the socialist realist literary circles was the weekly "kuźnica", managed since 1949 by Paweł Hoffman. From this point until the end of Stalinism in the People's Republic, Socialist realism was an official cultural policy of the country. Writers and poets created works glorifying Joseph Stalin, the Communist doctrine, and the Polish United Workers' Party. Following Stalin's death, there were some critical opinions expressed about such literature, but Socialist realism was still being practised until the 1956 Polish October, when the policy was finally abandoned.

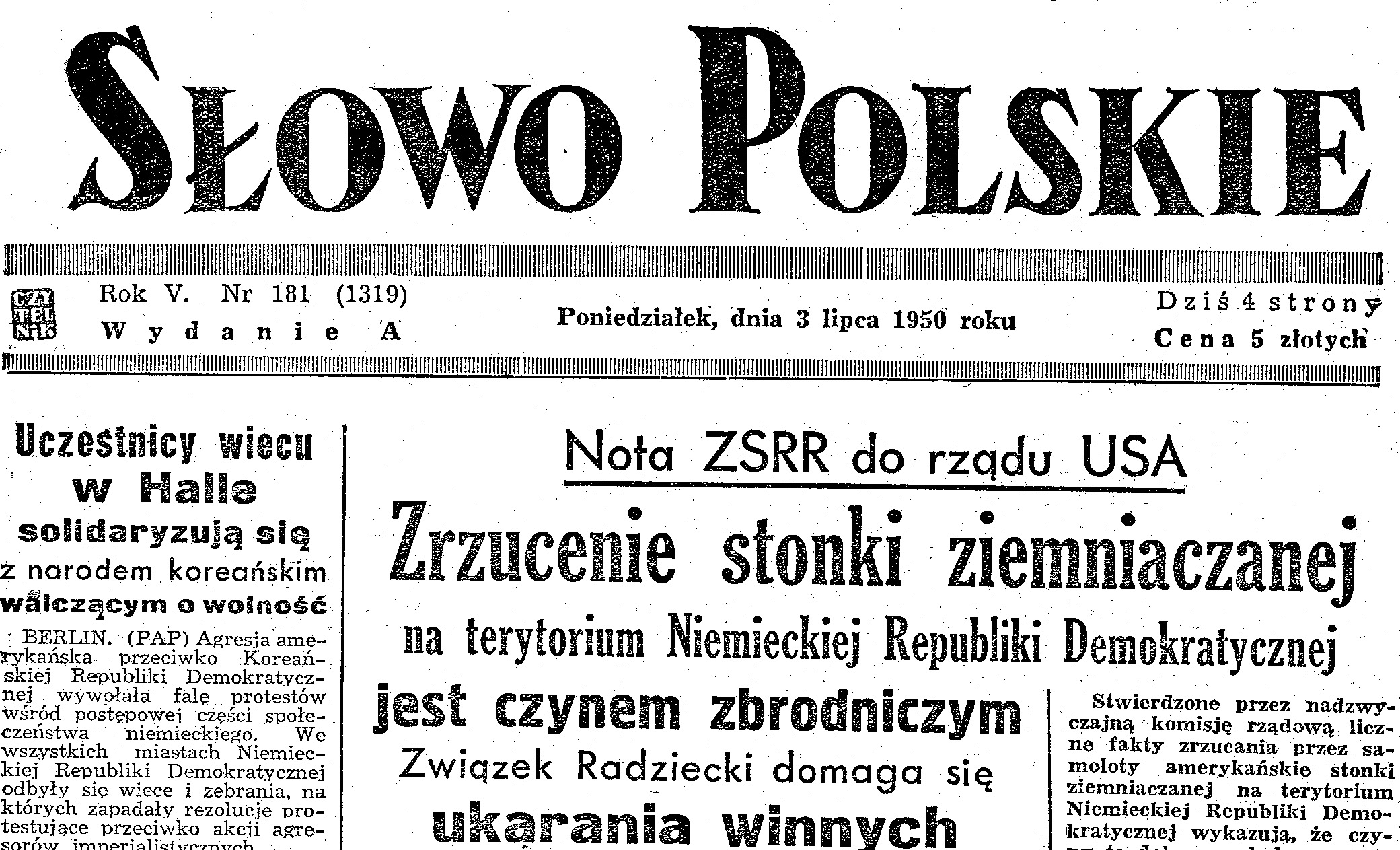
Daily newspaper Słowo Polskie from July 3, 1950 with front page protest against American spy-planes dumping potato bug in Central and Eastern Europe

During Stalinism there were no independent publishers or newspapers. Writers and poets had to write books compatible with the official doctrine or they were denied publication. There were some authors like Zbigniew Herbert who didn't want to glorify communism, so they were absent from cultural life. Others were blacklisted. But most of writers and poets obeyed the government's new cultural policies and were willing to describe the People's Republic of Poland as a land of happiness and freedom living under the benign dispensations of the Communist Party.

There were two generations of authors. The first consisted of writers who had already made names for themselves before World War II, publishing books in the interwar period or during the war. Some of them were fascinated by the new order, and genuinely believed that communism would help the workers, the farmers and the poor. Because of that they joined the Polish United Workers' Party and became political activists like Leon Kruczkowski (playwright) who became a Member of Parliament, or the poet Julian Przyboś - who entered diplomatic service and was posted to Switzerland. Those writers who cooperated with the government wielded a strong influence over the entirety of cultural life in Poland. One writer and publicist, Jerzy Putrament, was made a member of the Central Committee of the Polish United Workers' Party in recognition of his loyalty to the communist cause.

The second generation of writers was known as The Spotty-Faced (the origin of the nickname is a matter of dispute, with sources variously attributing its coinage to Julian Przyboś, Jan Kott or Zofia Nałkowska). Those were young authors convinced that communism was a fair social system who made their debuts believing that as writers and poets they should make all the people believe in the ideas of Karl Marx and Vladimir Lenin. Some of them, like Wiktor Woroszylski, Andrzej Braun and Witold Wirpsza, dominated literature and had a strong political impact locally, provoking a degree of anxiety in other writers because of their zeal and self-confidence. The Spotty-Faced lost their influence after the Polish Thaw, and many slipped into literary oblivion.

There was also a small group of writers which included famous authors and emerging names who refused to write socialist realistic novels, and chose to remain silent. They published their books after the end of Bierut's era. Zbigniew Herbert and Miron Białoszewski debuted in 1955, Jerzy Zawieyski, a Catholic writer and playwright (debuted in 1921) was denied publication. Such contrarian voices were often connected to the Catholic magazine Tygodnik Powszechny.

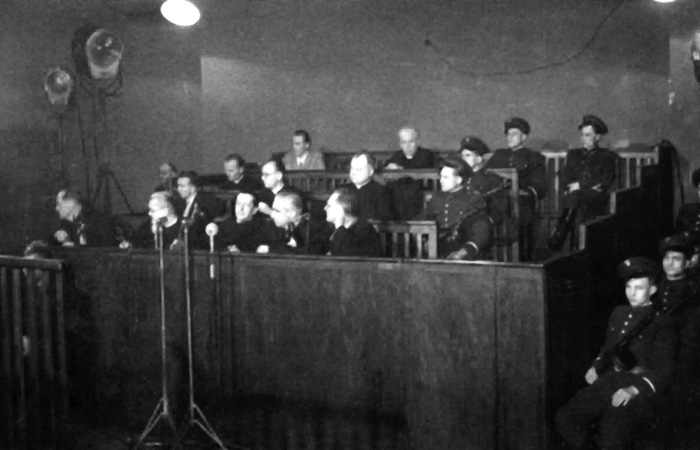
Stalinist show trial of the Kraków Curia supported by the Resolution of Union of Polish Writers

Socialist realist writers aimed to portray ordinary people and their daily life. The plot of a typical socialist realist novel or short story was usually set in the workplace, so this kind of book is often referred to as "factory literature" (Polish: produkcyjniaki). Factories, coal mines, construction sites, small towns and villages were typical locations. Some novels depicted major communist construction projects like Nowa Huta: Janina Dziarnowska's Jesteśmy z Nowej Huty (We Are From Nowa Huta) or Początek opowieści (The Beginning of the Story) by Marian Brandys.

The story of the social realist novel is schematic and uncomplicated. The establishing opening often shows a factory ruined by war, operated by disheartened and corrupt staff. The future is shrouded with a sense of gloom. The only upright, positive characters are the local activists from the Polish United Workers' Party, but even they find themselves unable to convince the workers of the advantages of the Six-Year Plan. There is always a positive character who tries to encourage the others to work better and to join the Party. He fails initially because of the machinations of the villain, but as time goes by the rest of the workforce is made to see the light and to embrace the ideas of the Six-Year Plan. The plant begins to prosper, and everyone's personal problems are also solved to arrive at the obligatory happy ending.

A typical positive character wants to be a fine worker, perhaps even an udarnik. He is an idealist, a man of strong communist convictions who makes speeches in political rallies and spends a lot of time reading Marxist literature, especially Krótki kurs historii WKP(b) (A short story of All-Union Communist Party (bolsheviks)) and Stalin's Zagadnienia leninizmu (Questions of leninism). He could be an experienced worker who had long believed in communism, or a young men imbued with fresh enthusiasm for the new times. The protagonist is kind, intelligent, devoted to the Party, and always willing to help. The factory owes every improvement and invention to him. His greatest dream is to play his part in the victory of communism. At the end of a socialist realist novel his efforts find recognition and, if he was a bachelor, he finds a true love.

The antagonist is a political adversary and a member of a hostile social class like the bourgeoisie. Never a mere criminal, he must be an actual enemy of the people. He could be a former (pre-war) police officer, a factory owner or a sanation political operative. In some novels he is a spy from the United States, the United Kingdom, West Germany or France. The villain detests communism and hates the workers; he is typically a nasty, merciless piece of work, prepared to inflict unflinching harm on all around him, like committing acts of sabotage or conspiring against the hero. At the end of the novel he is unmasked (usually by the hero or by a member of the secret police) and imprisoned.

There are also supporting characters, such as the local leader of the Party. He is often portrayed as a wise, righteous man, mentoring the young hero and acting as his patron. He gives warnings to his young friend about the conspiring enemies, and advises him to be always on guard against the lurking dangers of imperialist forces. Another typical character is an old worker, engineer or craftsman who remembers the pre-war days in Poland. He has no enthusiasm for communism, and even wants Poland to be liberated from the Soviet Union.

== Poetry ==
Poetry was prized for its emotional potential to raise the flagging spirits and stir faith in the revolution. Socialist realist poetry focused on the beauty of the postwar world, the value of work and the general enthusiasm for the government. Socialist realist lyrics were similar to hymns and eulogies, and glorified factories, ships, coal and electricity.

Especially noteworthy was the spate of lyrics on Joseph Stalin and other communist politicians. In Adam Ważyk's poem The River Stalin's wisdom is compared to a great river which circles the Earth, uniting people all over the world to bring them peace and joy. Władysław Broniewski wrote the lyric A few words about Stalin in which Stalin is described as the driver of "history's train".

In 1955 poet Adam Ważyk (a member of the Polish United Workers' Party and a staunch supporter of Communism) published A Poem for Adults ("Poemat dla dorosłych"), which described postwar Poland in a critical way. Although Ważyk was a voice of Stalinism beforehand, he eventually rejected it, and criticised the results of it in the country, but only at the time of its impending disintegration. Ważyk was strongly criticised for this long poem which appeared in Nowa Kultura, an official publication of the Association of Polish Writers controlled by the Communists. It was a turning point in the wave of literary critiques of the Stalinist regime since 1956.

== See also ==
- Real socialism concept of the Brezhnev era
