= House of the Signatories =

Coordinates: 54°40′56″N 25°17′22″E

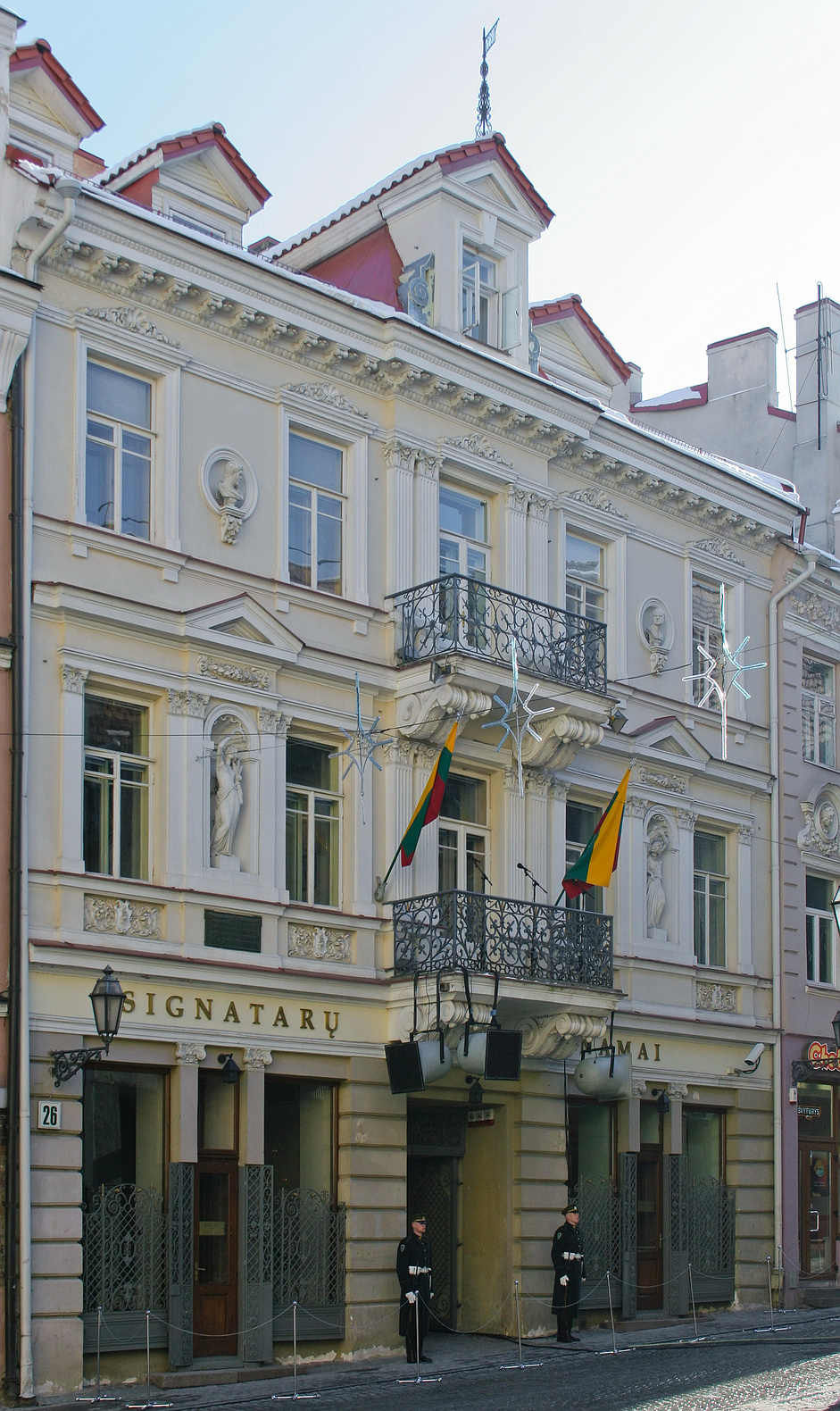
The House of the Signatories on February 16, 2007

The House of the Signatories (Lithuanian: Signatarų namai, previously known as Sztral's House) is a Lithuanian historic landmark on Pilies Street, Vilnius, where on February 16, 1918, the Act of Independence of Lithuania was signed by twenty members of the Council of Lithuania.

== History ==
The building was first mentioned in writing in an edict issued in 1645. The house changed owners several times during the 17th and 18th centuries, and after major fires in the 18th century, it underwent a reconstruction and the third floor was built. In the late 19th century, Kazimierz Sztral renovated the building in a Neo-Renaissance style after a project by a Russian architect Alexiey Polozov. The second floor has decorative sculptures symbolizing agriculture and fishing. The third floor acquired two male busts. Mr. Sztral opened the "Biały Sztral" (English: White Sztral) café, which operated until 1939. The cafe was named "White Sztral" (or "Sztrall") to distinguish it from four other cafes owned by Kazimierz Sztrall, including "Zielony Sztral" (Green) and "Czerwony Sztral" (Red). The cafe, frequented by local high society, was immortalised by Konstanty Ildefons Gałczyński in his Vilnian Elegies.

Although closed down following the city's return to Lithuania, it was soon reopened and housed the "Ksantypa" cabaret run by artists who fled from Nazi-occupied part of Poland, among them Janusz Minkiewicz, Mieczysław Szpakiewicz, Stanisława Perzanowska, Marta Mirska and Światopełk Karpiński. As such it operated until the second Soviet occupation. The cafe was re-opened in 2000.

Prior to 1918, the upper floors were used for rentals. The Lithuanian Society for the Relief of War Sufferers operated out of the building during World War I. In one of the Committee's offices on the third floor, on February 16, 1918, the twenty members of the Council of Lithuania signed the Act of Independence of Lithuania, reestablishing Lithuania's independence. Afterwards the house was adapted to the needs of various Lithuanian organizations, as well as continuing to serve as a residence.

Soon after Lithuania regained independence in 1990 from the Soviet Union, the house was dedicated as a museum, and opened to the public in 2000. Since 2003 the museum has been a branch of the National Museum of Lithuania. Annual commemoration ceremonies of the independence are held in the House of the Signatories on February 16.

== Bibliography ==
- Venclova, Tomas (2006). Vilnius: City Guide. Translated by Aušra Simanavičiūtė (6th ed.). Vilnius: R. Paknio leidykla. p. 93. ISBN 9986-830-48-6.
- "Signatarų namai" (in Lithuanian). National Museum of Lithuania. 2006-09-11.
