= Leszek Szaruga =

Polish poet, writer, and translator (1946–2024)

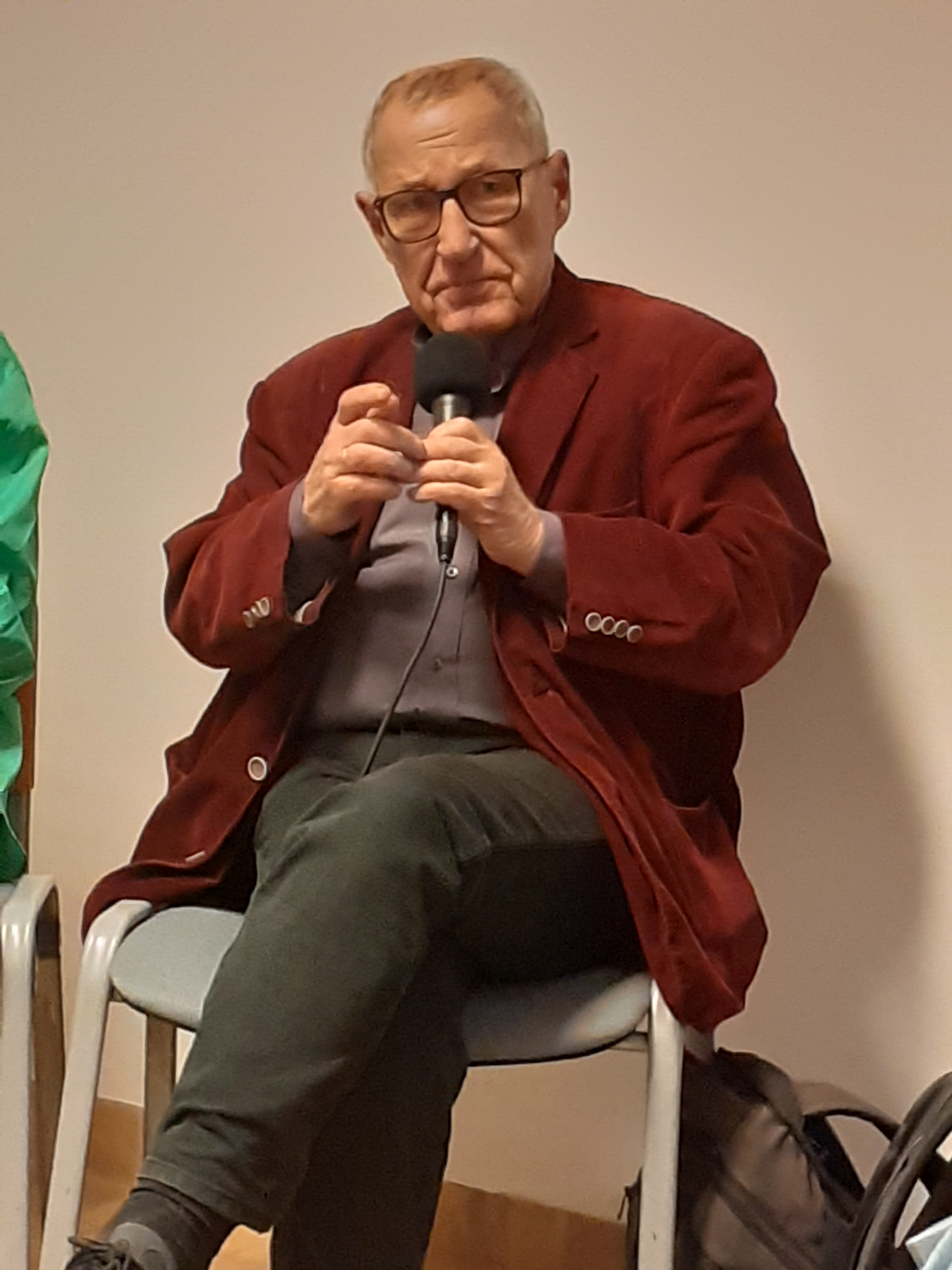
- Leszek Szaruga, 2023
- Born: Aleksander Stanisław Wirpsza; 28 February 1946
- Died: 15 October 2024 (aged 78)
- Citizenship: Polish
- Occupations: Poet, writer, translator

Leszek Szaruga (28 February 1946 – 15 October 2024) was a poet, prose writer, essayist, literary translator, literary historian, critic and academic lecturer.

== Biography ==
He was the son of Witold Wirpsza and Maria Kurecka. From 1982 until 1987 he co-edited (with Iwona Smolka, Tomasz Jastrun and Jarosław Markiewicz) the quarterly Wezwanie.

== Poetry books ==
- Wiersze. Poznań: Oficyna Literatów i Krytyków. 1980.
- Nie ma poezji. Kraków: Krakowska Oficyna Studentów. 1981.
- Czas morowy. Warszawa: Wydawnictwo Wydma. 1982.
- Przez zaciśnięte zęby. Warszawa: Wydawnictwo Przedświt. 1983.
- ...i inne wiersze. Poznań: Wydawnictwo Głosy. 1984.
- Mgły. Gdańsk: Wydawnictwo Federacji Młodzieży Walczącej. 1987.
- Nie mówcie Europa/Sagt nicht Europa. West Berlin: Wydawnictwo Pogląd. 1988.
- Po wszystkim. Kraków: Oficyna Literacka. 1992.
- Klucz od przepaści. Kraków: Oficyna Literacka. 1994.
- Eiszeit. Steinzeit. Renate Schmidgall (translated by). Hamburg: ROSPO. 1997.
- Skupienie. Kraków: Wydawnictwo Miniatura. 1997.
- Każdy jest kimś. Kraków: Wydawnictwo Miniatura. 2000.
- Przed burzą. Kraków: Wydawnictwo Miniatura. 2001.
- Panu Tadeuszowi. Szczecin: Wydawnictwo 13 muz. 2001.
- Wiersze skrócone. Kraków: Wydawnictwo Miniatura. 2004.
- Mówienia. Toruń: Wydawnictwo Adam Marszałek. 2004.
- Wymysły. Kraków: Wydawnictwo Miniatura. 2005.
- Życiowy wybór (wiersze 1968–1998). Warszawa: Wydawnictwo Nowy Świat. 2006.
- Garść wierszy użytkowych. Kraków: Wydawnictwo Miniatura. 2007.
- Blag (języczenie). Kraków: Wydawnictwo Miniatura. 2008.
- Kanibale lubią ludzi. Szczecin: Wydawnictwo Forma. 2012.
- After All. Frank I. Vigoda (translated by). 2013.
- Pomysł zapisu informacji (nielogiczny). Kraków: Wydawnictwo Miniatura. 2013.
- Logo Reya. Kraków: Wydawnictwo Miniatura. 2015.
- Fluktuacja kwantowa. Sopot: Biblioteka Toposu. 2015.
- Trochę inne historie. Warszawa: Wydawnictwo Convivo. 2016.
- Wybór z Księgi. Kraków: Wydawnictwo Miniatura. 2016.
- Skrót Księgi. Kraków: Wydawnictwo Miniatura. 2016.
- Extractum. Warszawa: Fundacja Duży Format. 2017.
- Zaczyna się. Warszawa: Wydawnictwo Convivo. 2018.
- W tym samym czasie. Szczecin: Zaułek Pomyłka. 2018.
- Istnienie. Szczecin: Zaułek Wydawniczy Pomyłka. 2020.
- Łowca. Warszawa: Wydawnictwo Convivo. 2021.
- Mucha. Warszawa: Wydawnictwo Convivo. 2021.
- Na języki. Tanowo: Zaułek Wydawniczy Pomyłka. 2022.
- Jeszcze trochę inne historie. Warszawa: Wydawnictwo Convivo. 2022.
- List. Warszawa: Wydawnictwo Convivo. 2023.

== Prose writings ==
- Pudło. Szczecin: Wydawnictwo im. Uniwersytetu Pomorza Zachodniego. 1981.
- Tym czasem. 2001.
- Wodna pieczęć. 2001.
- Zdjęcie. Szczecin: Wydawnictwo Forma. 2008.
- Dane elementarne. Szczecin: Wydawnictwo Forma. 2008.
- Podróż mego życia. Szczecin: Wydawnictwo Forma. 2008.
- Das foto. Herne: Gabriele Schäfer Verlag. 2011.
- ...zmowa kontrolowana. Warszawa: Wydawnictwo Papierowy Motyl. 2014.

== Collections of essays ==
- Własnymi słowami. Warszawa: Biblioteka Głosu. 1979.
- Szkoła polska. Warszawa: Wydawnictwo Przedświt. 1984.
- Walka o godność. Poezja polska w latach 1939–1988. Zarys głównych problemów. West Berlin: Korner Verlag. 1988.
- W Polsce, czyli Nigdzie. West Berlin: Wydawnictwo Pogląd. 1988.
- Wobec cenzury: kostium kościelny w prozie polskiej. Wobec totalitaryzmu. Szczecin: Ottonianum. 1994.
- Zapis Zarys monograficzny. Biblioteka Zawartości. Szczecin: Wydawnictwo Naukowe Uniwersytetu Szczecińskiego. 1996.
- Dochodzenie do siebie. Sejny: Wydawnictwo Fundacji Pogranicza. 1997.
- Powrót poetów. Kraków: Wydawnictwo Miniatura. 1997.
- Milczenie i krzyk. Pięć esejów z powodu Młodej Polski. Lublin: Wydawnictwo Naukowe UMCS. 1997.
- Historia – państwo – literatura. Szczecin: Wydawnictwo Naukowe Uniwersytetu Szczecińskiego. 1999.
- Co czytamy? Prasa literacka 1945–1995. Lublin: Wydawnictwo Naukowe UMCS. 1999.
- Kazimierz Brakoniecki. Kraków: Zespół Literacki „polska 2000”. 2000.
- Erwin Kruk. Kraków: Zespół Literacki „polska 2000”. 2000.

== Distinctions and accolades ==
- Knight's Cross of the Order of Polonia Restituta (2008)
- Silver Gloria Artis Medal for Merit to Culture
- Kościelski Award (1986)
