= Jarosław Markiewicz =

Polish poet, novelist and painter (1942–2010)

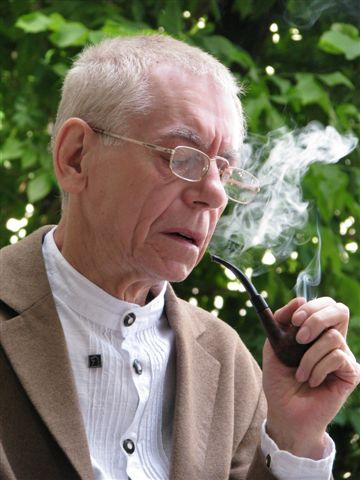
- Markiewicz in 2008
- Born: 12 June 1942; Wysokie
- Died: 25 June 2010 (aged 68); Warsaw, Poland
- Citizenship: Polish
- Occupations: Poet, novelist, painter

Jarosław Markiewicz (12 June 1942 – 25 June 2010) was a Polish poet, novelist and painter.

== Biography ==
Son of Stefan Markiewicz, a policeman, and Zofia née Woźniak. He studied philosophy and history at the University of Warsaw. He made his debut as a poet in the press in 1957. In 1969 he founded Workers' Theatre at Terespolska Street in Warsaw. From 1970 until 1983 he was a member of the Polish Writers' Union. From 1982 until 1987 he co-edited (with Iwona Smolka, Tomasz Jastrun and Leszek Szaruga) the quarterly Wezwanie. In 1982 he co-founded (with Wacław Holewiński) an independent publishing house Przedświt. From 1989 he was a member of Polish Writers Association. He practiced Zen. He was buried at the Northern Communal Cemetery.

== Works ==
=== Poetry ===
- Stadion słoneczny. Wydawnictwo Iskry. 1965.
- Przyszedłem zapytać o własne imię czasu, który wnoszę. ZSP. 1968.
- Podtrzymując radosne pozory trwania pochodu. Wydawnictwo Literackie. 1971.
- W ciałach kobiet wschodzi słońce. Państwowy Instytut Wydawniczy. 1976.
- i. Państwowy Instytut Wydawniczy. 1980.
- Wybór wierszy. Warsaw: Czytelnik. 1988.
- Papierowy bęben. Przedświt. 1996.
- Wiersze górne i dolne. Warsaw: Przedświt. 2003.

=== Novel ===
- Chaos wita w tobie łotra i świętego. Warsaw: Państwowy Instytut Wydawniczy. 1979.

=== Theatre plays ===
- Między nagimi idą nadzy. 1971.
- Palec boży. 1972.

== Accolades ==
- Award of the Barbara Sadowska Literary Award Foundation (1998)
- Knight's Cross of the Order of Polonia Restituta (1999)
