= Witold Wirpsza =

Polish poet, writer, and translator (1918–1985)

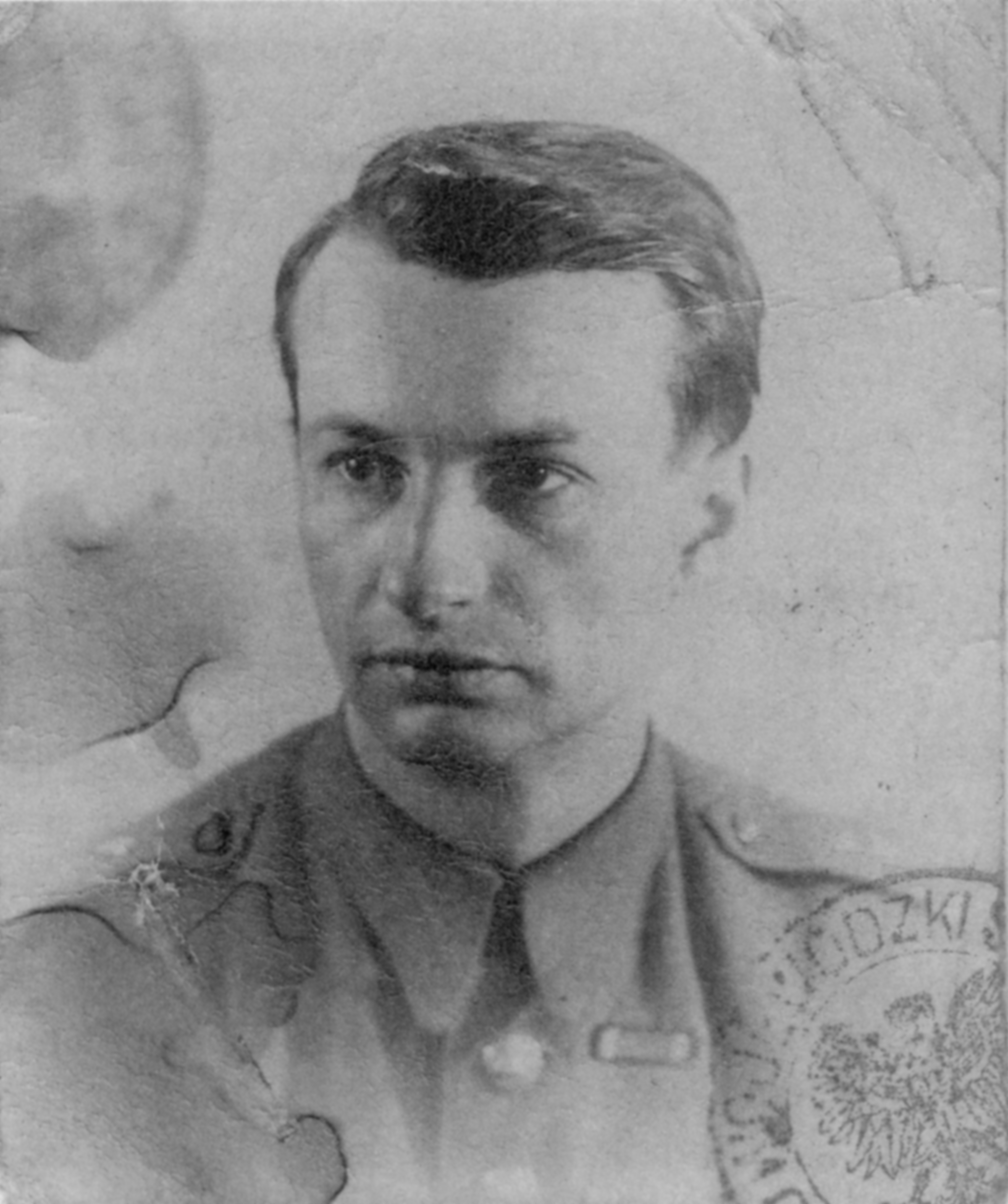
- Witold Wirpsza, 1946
- Born: 4 December 1918; Odesa, Ukraine
- Died: 16 September 1985 (aged 66); Berlin, Germany
- Citizenship: Polish
- Occupations: Poet, writer, translator

Witold Wirpsza (4 December 1918 — 16 September 1985) was a Polish poet, writer, translator and essayist.

== Biography ==
He was the son of Stanisław Wirpsza, merchant, and Lidia née Spandoni-Basmandżi. In 1945 he married Maria Kurecka. Their son Aleksander (later known under his pen name Leszek Szaruga) was born in 1946.

He was a member of Polish Writers' Union (ZLP) from 1948 until 1971. He published in “Twórczość”, “Nowa Kultura”, “Życie Literackie” and “Przegląd Kulturalny” (1952–60). From 1952 to 1968 he was a member of the Polish United Workers' Party.

== Poetry books ==
- Sonata (1949)
- Stocznia (1949)
- Polemiki i pieśni (1951)
- Dziennik Kożedo (1952)
- Pisane w kraju (1952)
- List do żony (1953)
- Poematy i wiersze wybrane (1956)
- Z mojego życia (1956)
- Mały gatunek (1960)
- Don Juan (1960)
- Komentarze do fotografii (1962)
- Drugi opór (1965)
- Przesądy (1966)
- Bruchsünden und todstücke (1967)
- Traktat skłamany (1968)
- Drei Berliner Gedichte (1976)
- Prognosen oder Die Naturgeschichte der Drachen (1980)
- Apoteoza tańca (1985)
- Liturgia (1985)
- Faeton (1988)
- Nowy podręcznik wydajnego zażywania narkotyków (1995)
- Cząstkowa próba o człowieku i inne wiersze (2005)
- Spis ludności (2005)
- Utwory ostatnie (2007)

== Novels ==
- Na granicy (1954)
- Pomarańcze na drutach (1964)
- Wagary (1970)
- Sama niewinność (partially published in 1978 and 1985)

== Short stories ==
- Stary tramwaj i inne opowiadania (1955)
- Morderca (1966)

== Essays ==
- Gra znaczeń (1965)
- Polaku, kim jesteś? (1971)

== Accolades ==
In 1955 he received Knight's Cross of the Order of Polonia Restituta. In 1967 he received the Johann-Heinrich-Voß-Preis für Übersetzung.
