= Northern Communal Cemetery =

Cemetery in Warsaw, Poland

Coordinates: 52°18′10″N 20°53′49″E

- Cmentarz Komunalny Północny
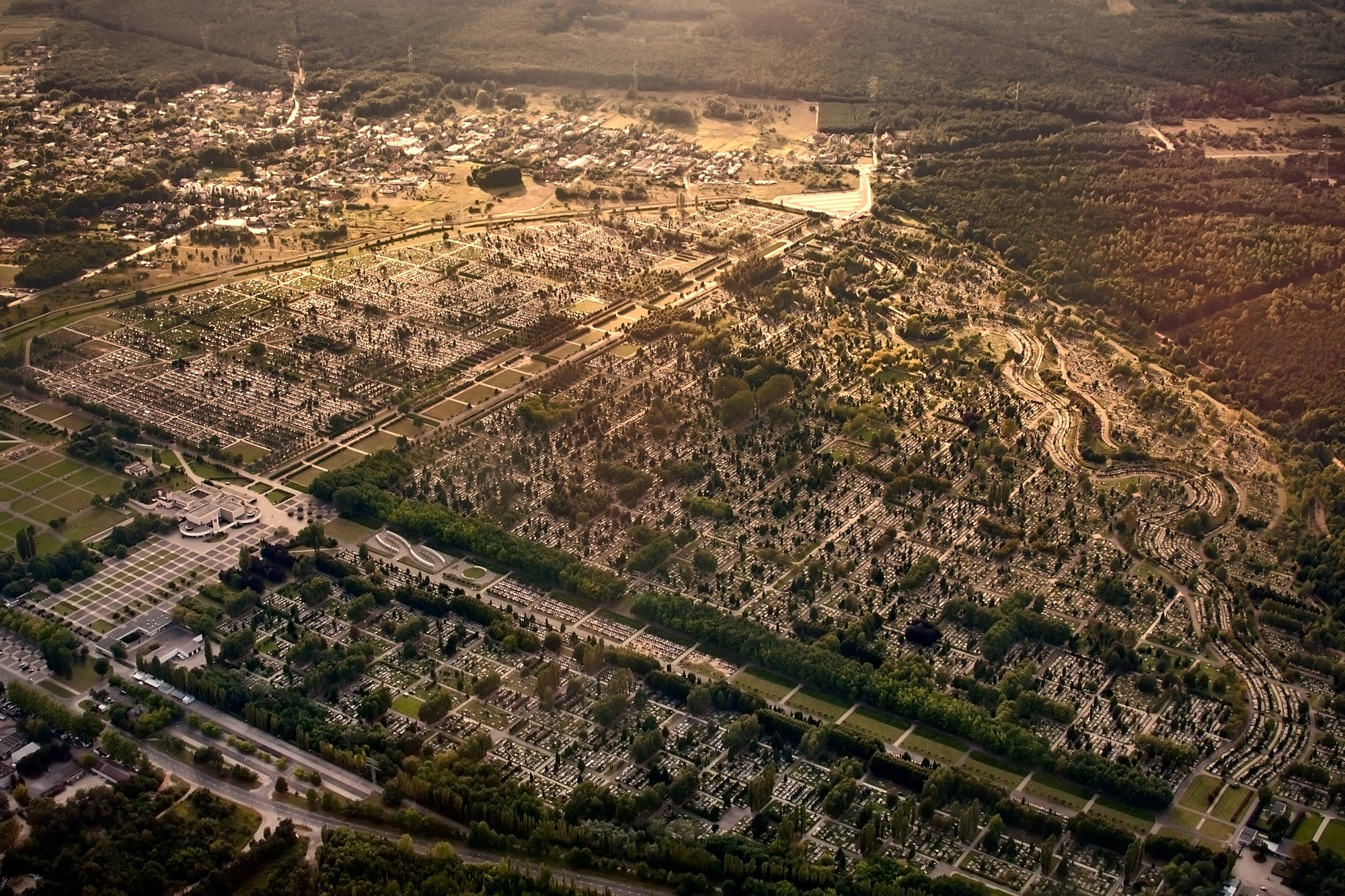

- Location within Warsaw

Details
- Established: 1973
- Location: Bielany, Warsaw
- Country: Poland
- Type: Municipal
- Owned by: Municipal Cemeteries Board
- Size: 143 hectares (350 acres)
- No. of graves: 180,000
- Website: cmentarzekomunalne.com.pl

Northern Communal Cemetery (Polish: Cmentarz Komunalny Północny) is one of the largest cemeteries in Poland and Europe, located in Młociny and Wólka Węglowa in the Bielany district of Warsaw, Poland. The site for the cemetery was established in the 1960s at the northern outskirts of the city and partly in the area of the village of Wólka Węglowa (hence the colloquial name Cemetery in Wólka, Cmentarz na Wólce). The cemetery was opened in 1973 and so far nearly 180,000 of the dead have been buried here.

== Some notable burials ==
A few of the notables buried here are:

- Maria Bogucka
- Zofia Czerwińska
- Piotr Grudziński
- Jan Himilsbach
- Marcin Kołodyński
- Jarosław Markiewicz
- Marta Mirska
- Bohdan Poręba
- Hubert Wagner

== Collective graves ==
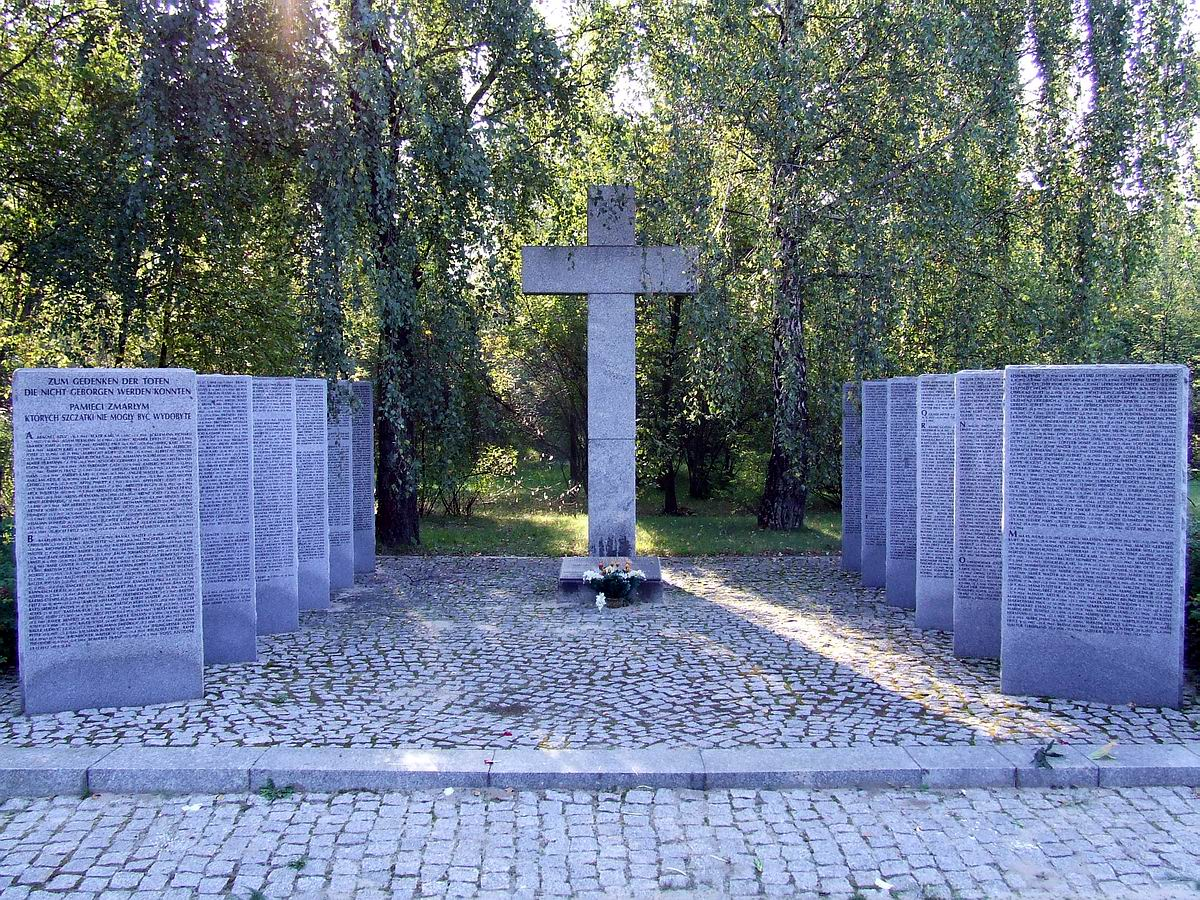
War quarters of German soldiers

- The grave of the victims of the plane crash in the Kabaty Woods on May 9, 1987
- The grave of the victims of the plane crash in Okęcie on March 14, 1980
- War quarters of German soldiers
