= Stanisław Wygodzki =

Polish writer

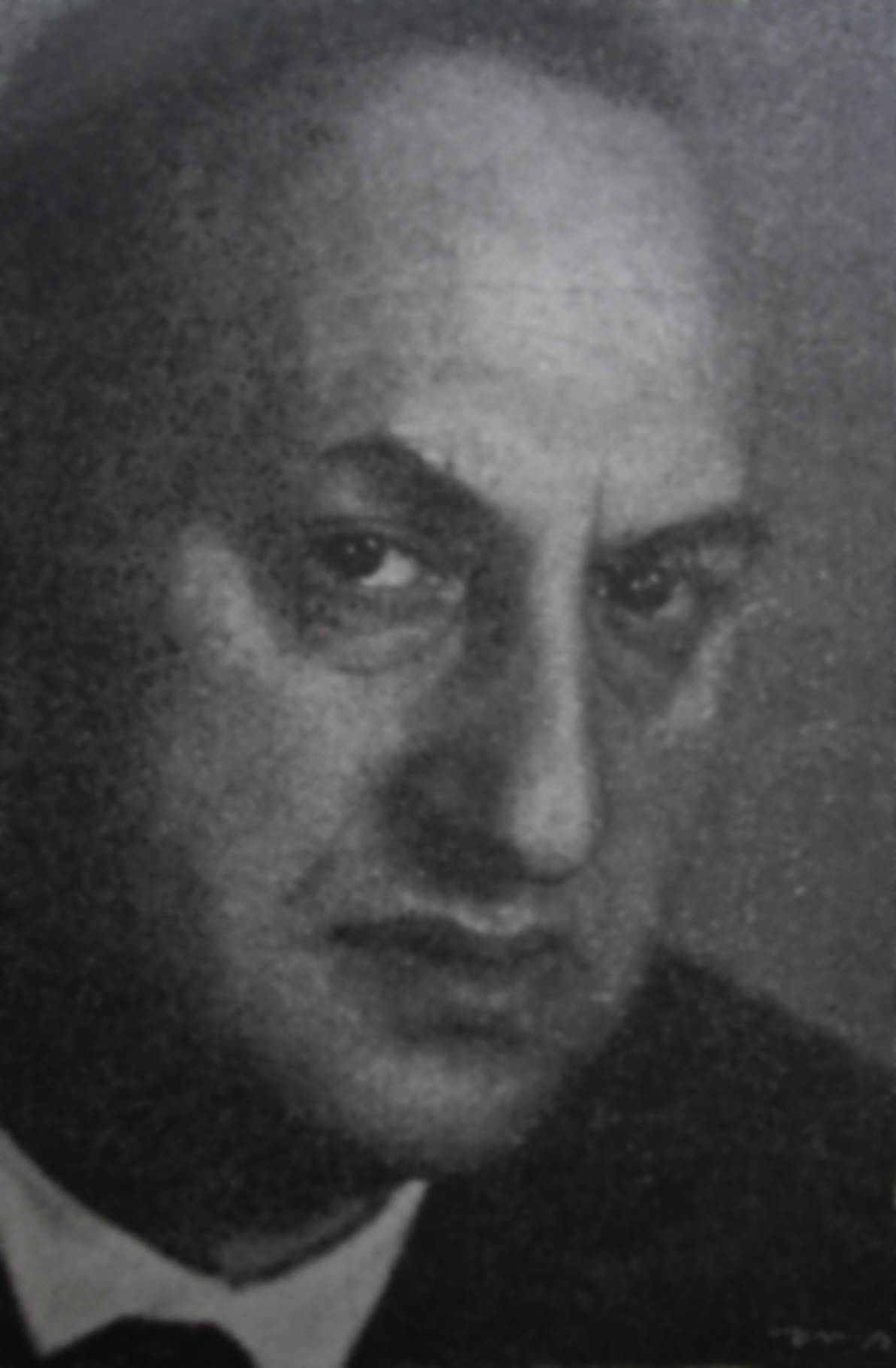
- Pronunciation: staˈɲiswaf vɨˈɡɔd͡zkʲi
- Born: 13 January 1907; Będzin
- Died: 9 May 1992 (aged 85); Tel Aviv
- Occupation: writer

Stanisław Wygodzki (Polish pronunciation: [staˈɲiswaf vɨˈɡɔd͡zkʲi]) (13 January 1907 in Będzin, Poland – 9 May 1992 in Tel Aviv, Israel) was a Polish writer of Jewish origin.

== Life ==
He published his first volume of poetry in 1933 before the Nazi occupation of Poland, during which Wygodzki was first interred in the Bedzin ghetto and later in the concentration camps of Auschwitz, Dachau, Oranienburg and Sachsenhausen. During the war he was issued Paraguayan passport by Ładoś Group.

His health impacted by his experiences, Wygodzki did not resume publishing until 1947, following which he became a successful writer, publishing poetry, short stories and one novel. Wygodzki, who lost his wife, daughter and parents in Auschwitz, was one of four winners of the 1969 "Remembrance Award", awarded annually by the World Federation of Bergen-Belsen Associations for "excellence in literature on the Nazi atrocities against European Jewry". A communist in his youth who was briefly imprisoned in Poland as an adult for his communist activities, Wygodzki resettled in Israel in 1968 in response to antisemitism in the Communist Party in Poland.

== See also ==
- Socialist realism in Poland

== Sources ==
- Adamczyk-Garbowska, Monica (2003). "Stanisław Wygodzki". In S. Lillian Kremer (ed.). Holocaust literature: an encyclopedia of writers and their work. Taylor & Francis. pp. 1341–1343. ISBN 0-415-92984-9.
- babelfish.yahoo.com
- Museum of the History of Polish Jews
