= Janina Dziarnowska =

Polish-Ukrainian writer and Soviet literature expert

- Яніна Дзярновська
- Born: 13 November 1903; Juzovka, Ukraine
- Died: 22 December 1992 (aged 89); Warsaw, Poland
- Education: Free Polish University
- Occupations: writer, translator and publicist
- Organization: Union of Polish Writers
- Notable work: The City of New People (1953)
- Political party: Communist Party of Poland; Polish United Workers' Party
- Movement: Socialist realism in Poland

Janina Dziarnowska (née Tołwiński, 13 November 1903 – 22 December 1992) was a Ukrainian born Polish writer and translator, publicist, and expert on Soviet literature. She wrote in the style of Socialist realism in Poland. She was a member of the Communist Party of Poland then the Polish United Workers' Party.

== Early life ==
Dziarnowska was born on 13 November 1903 at Juzovka (now known as Donetsk) in Ukraine. Her father was Kazimierz Tołwiński, an engineer, and her mother was Maria Tołwiński (née Markowska). The family moved to Poland when Dziarnowska was 11 years old.

== Education and early career ==
She was educated at the Pedagogical Department of the Free Polish University in Warsaw, and became a member of the leftist Students' Union. After graduating, Dziarnowska worked as a primary school teacher in Marki near Warsaw, and then as a clerk.

== Writing ==
Dziarnowska wrote her first novel Maritta in 1930 (the manuscript was destroyed during World War II), then began translating literature into Russian in 1934. In 1937 she became the editorial secretary of the magazine Życie WSM. She also published reviews for Nowe Książki. In 1936, Dziarnowska joined the Communist Party of Poland.

When Poland was occupied by Nazi Germany, Dziarnowska was living in Poland. Her book The Story of Anne later described the life of a Warsaw apartment house during the occupation, stressing the class contradictions of the residents. After the end of World War II, in 1945 she became a member of the Polish Workers' Party, known from 1948 as the Polish United Workers' Party (PZPR).

In 1948, Dziarnowska married Antoni Dziarnowski, a tram driver and trade union activist.

In 1951, Dziarnowska became a member of the Union of Polish Writers (ZLP). She wrote the novel The City of New People (1953) which praised the USSR, as well as We Are From Nowa Huta (1951) which depicted the major construction project of Nowa Huta. Her novel for teenagers titled When Others Are Children was translated into German. She was known for writing in the style of Socialist realism in Poland.

From 1966 to 1971 Dziarnowska was a member of the Central Committee of Party Control of the Polish United Workers' Party. For this role she made trips across the Union of Soviet Socialist Republics, including to the USSR (1963, 1965, 1970), Bulgaria (1965) and Algeria (1966, 1967).

== Death and legacy ==
Dziarnowska died on 22 December 1992 in Warsaw. She was honoured with a burial at the Powązki Military Cemetery in Warsaw, and is known as the "grand old lady of the revolution."

== Awards ==
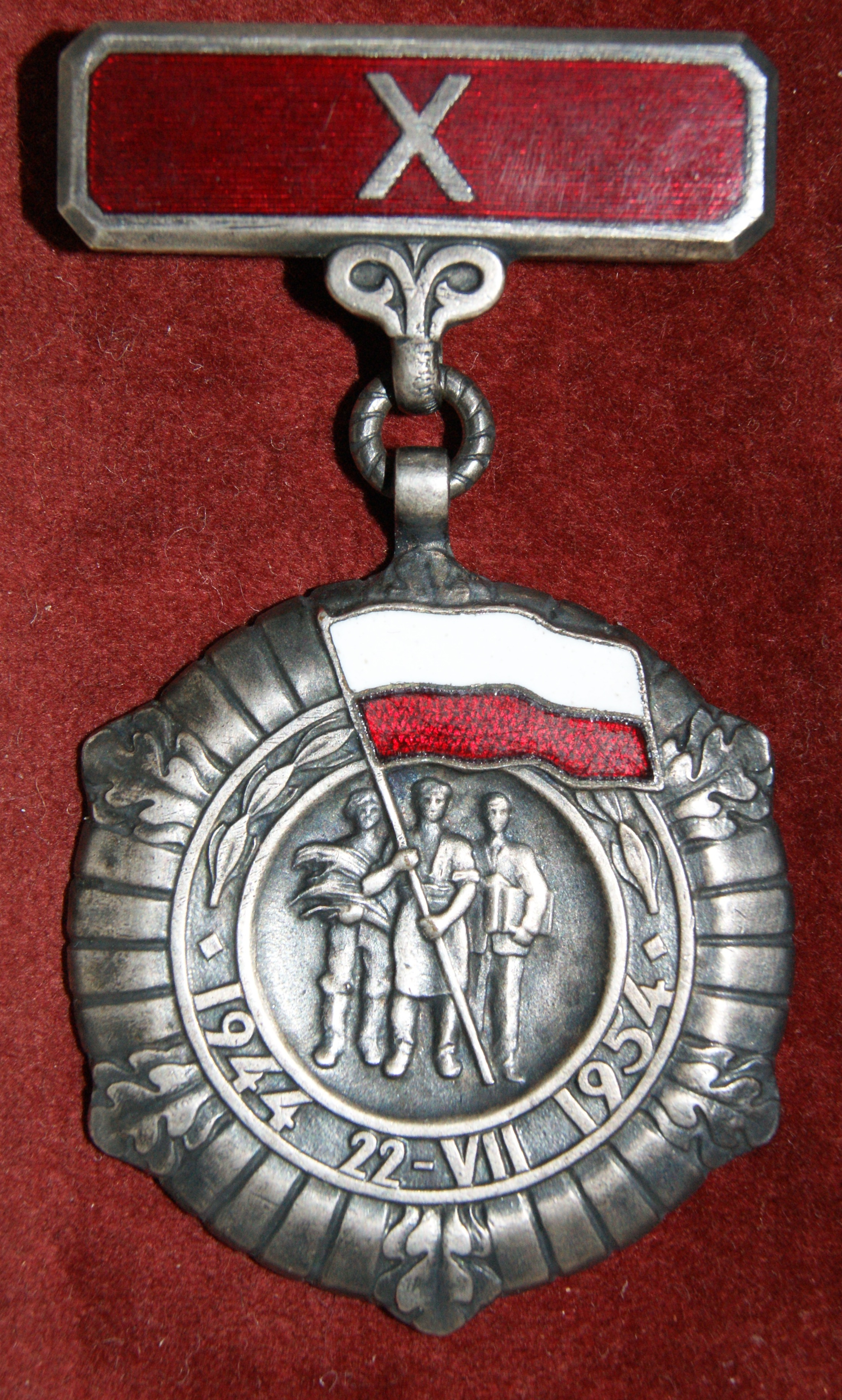
Medal of the 10th Anniversary of People's Poland

- Medal of the 10th Anniversary of People's Poland (1954)
- Knight of the Order of Polonia Restituta (1964)
- Order of the Banner of Labour, 2nd class (1974)
- Honorary Diploma of the Union of Soviet Writers (1976)
- Prime Minister's Award (1979)
