= Free Polish University =

Former Warsaw university

Coordinates: 52.2103°N 20.9818°E

- Wolna Wszechnica Polska
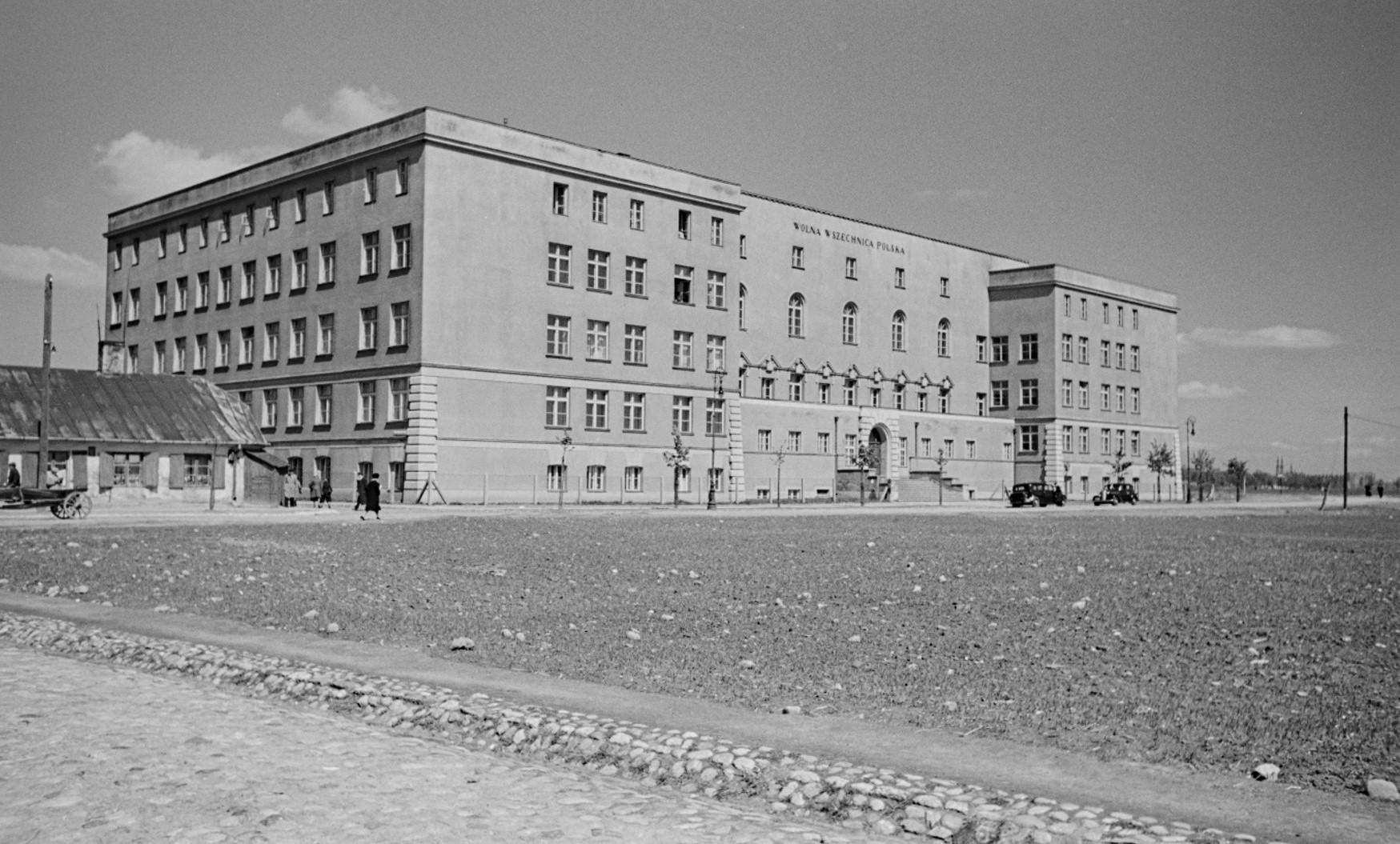
- Seat of the Free Polish University at 2a Opaczewska Street in Warsaw (1939)
- Active: 1918–1952
- Rector: Alfred Sokołowski (1916–1918); Ludwik Krzywicki (1918–1919)
- Academic staff: 70–80
- Students: 3000
- Location: Warsaw, Second Polish Republic

Free Polish University (Polish: Wolna Wszechnica Polska), founded in 1918 in Warsaw, was a private university with different departments: mathematics and natural sciences, humanities, political sciences and social pedagogy.

From 1929, its degrees were equivalent to those of university.

In the years 1919–1939 the institution employed 70–80 professors. In the academic year 1938/39 educated about 3000 students. The university conducted clandestine courses during the German occupation, but after the war, its activities were not resumed.

The university was disbanded in 1952.

== Notable alumni ==
- Janina Dziarnowska (1903–1992), writer and translator, publicist, and expert on Soviet literature.

== See also ==
- Education in Poland
- List of modern universities in Europe (1801–1945)
