= Marcin Kołodyński =

Polish actor (1980–2001)

- Born: 17 April 1980; Warsaw, Poland
- Died: 1 February 2001 (aged 20); Zakopane, Poland
- Resting place: Northern Communal Cemetery, Warsaw
- Occupation: Actor
- Years active: 1988–2001

Marcin Kołodyński (17 April 1980 – 1 February 2001) was a Polish actor and TV presenter.

== Education ==
He graduated from the Miguel de Cervantes Liceum in Warsaw. He studied journalism at the University of Warsaw.

== Death ==
He died in the vicinity of Zakopane, while snowboarding. While riding down a dimly lit slope at night, he hit a snow groomer and died at the scene. He was buried at the Northern Communal Cemetery in Warsaw (section S-V-15, row 10, site 3).

== Filmography ==
Feature films

- 1997: Sara
- 1999: Ajlawju – student
- 2000: Boys Don't Cry – Serfer

TV series

- 1999: Na dobre i na złe – Tomek's friend
- 1999–2001: Rodzina zastępcza – Darek Kwieciński, Majka Kwiatkowska's boyfriend
- 2001: M jak miłość – Paweł Zduński's friend

TV performances

- 1995: Chłopcy z placu broni – Czonakosz
- 1997: Szara róża – Krzysztof
- 1998: Usta Micka Jaggera – Bartek
- 2000: Siedemnastolatek
