= Włodzimierz Zakrzewski =

Polish painter, graphician and poster artist

- Born: 16 June 1916; Saint Petersburg, Russian Empire
- Died: 1992 (aged 75–76); Warsaw, Poland
- Known for: Painting; Graphics; Poster art

Włodzimierz Zakrzewski (1916–1992) was a Polish painter, graphician and poster artist. He was a professor of Academy of Fine Arts in Warsaw, founder and director of Front Poster Studio (Polish: Pracownia Plakatu Frontowego) of Ludowe Wojsko Polskie (1944–1948), member of the Group of Realists (Grupa Realistów).

Zakrzewski was an author of sociopolitical posters, landscape paintings (especially city landscapes of Warsaw and Paris) and figural compositions. He was a co-initiator of socialist realism in Polish painting and poster.

Notable works includes Olbrzym i zapluty karzeł reakcji (also known as AK. Zapluty karzeł reakcji; 1945), Towarzysz Bierut wśród robotników (1950), Wkraczamy w plan 6 letni [We are entering the Six-Year Plan] (1950), Partia [The Party] (1955).

== See also ==
- Socialist realism in Poland
