= Miguel de Cervantes 34th General Education High School with Bilingual Branches in Warsaw =

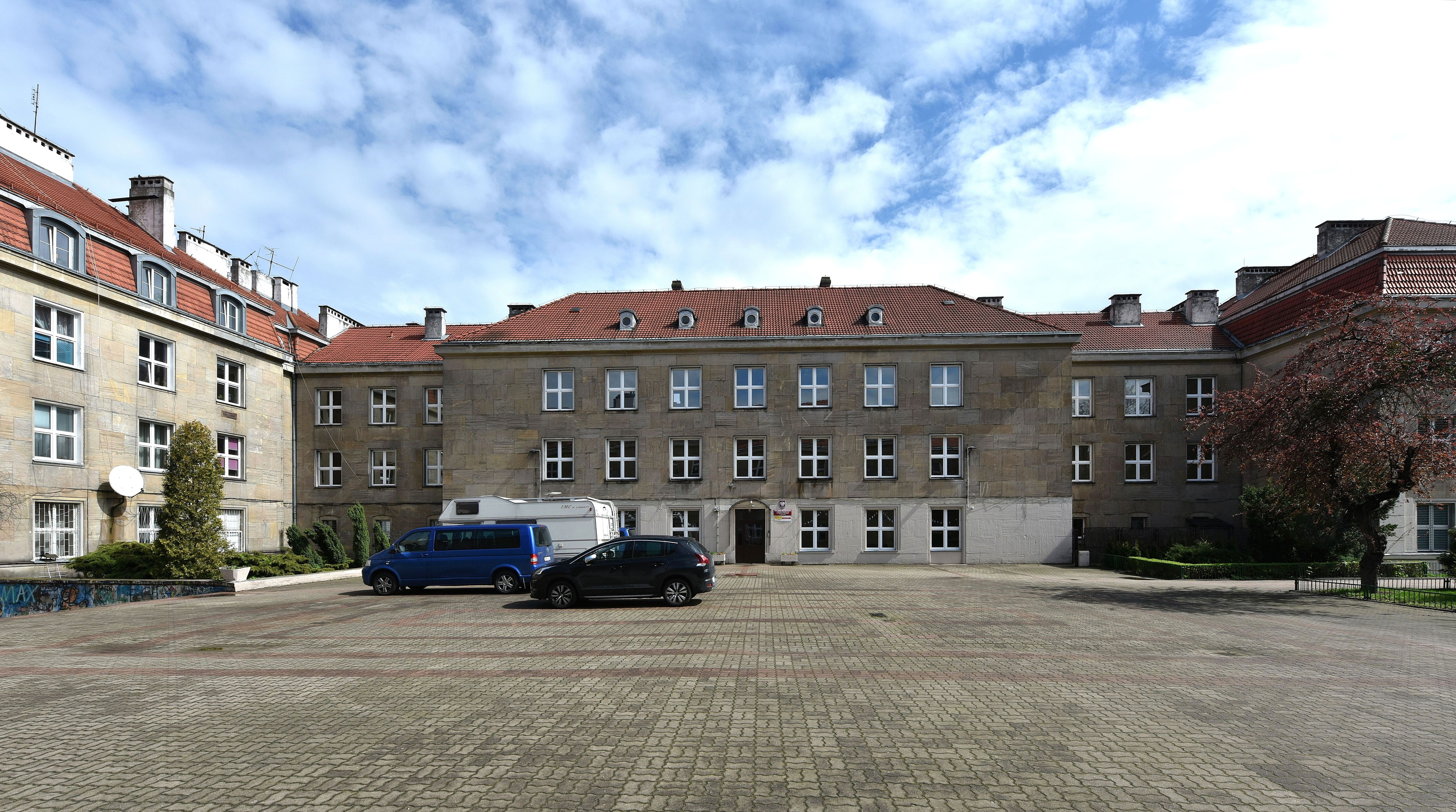

Location
- Zakrzewska 22; Warsaw, Masovian Voivodeship 00-737; Poland
- Coordinates: 52.2049°N 21.0407°E

Information
- Type: Public
- Patron saint: Miguel de Cervantes
- Established: 1945
- School district: Mokotów
- Principal: Anita Omelańczuk
- Age: 16 to 19
- Language: Bilingual: Polish, Spanish
- Website: Cervantes Liceum Website

Miguel de Cervantes 34th General Education High School with Bilingual Branches in Warsaw, (Note: Polish: XXXIV Liceum Ogólnokształcące z Oddziałami Dwujęzycznymi im. Miguela de Cervantesa w Warszawie) is a public general education liceum (secondary school) in Warsaw, Poland. In the years 1945-1991 was named the Karol Świerczewski Liceum. (Note: Polish: Liceum Karola Świerczewskiego)

== History ==
The school was established on 28 September 1945. A year later it was named after general Karol Świerczewski pseud. Walter. In the mid-1950s, the school was located in a building at ul. Zakrzewska 24. In the following years of the facility's existence, the scientific movement developed and a scout team was established. At the beginning of the 90s, a sports hall was put into use.

On 23 April 1991, the school was named after the Spanish writer Miguel de Cervantes.

== Notable alumni ==
- Magdalena Biejat – politician
- Piotr Fronczewski – actor
- Artur Górski – politician
- Joanna Jabłczyńska – actress
- Karol Kłos – volleyball player
- Marcin Kołodyński – actor and TV presenter
- Paweł Poncyljusz – politician
- Włodzimierz Press – actor
