= Adam Ważyk =

Polish poet, essayist and writer

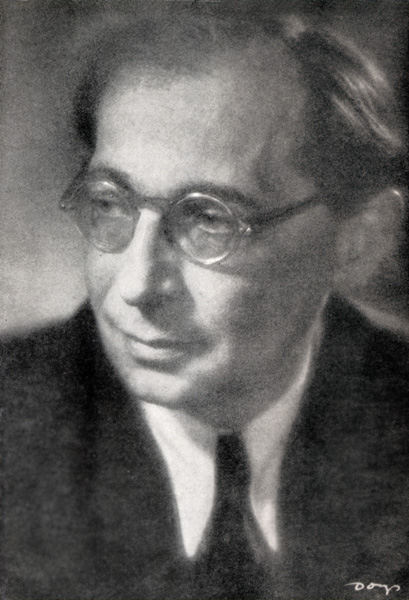
- Adam Ważyk
- Born: Ajzyk Wagman; 17 November 1905; Warsaw, Russian Empire
- Died: 13 August 1982 (aged 76)
- Occupations: Translator, Communist official
- Writing career
- Language: Polish

Adam Ważyk born Ajzyk Wagman (17 November 1905 – 13 August 1982) was a Polish poet, essayist and writer born to a Jewish family in Warsaw. In his early career, he was associated with the Kraków avant-garde led by Tadeusz Peiper who published Zwrotnica monthly. Ważyk wrote several collections of poetry in the interwar years. His work during this period focused largely on the losses of World War I.

As a member of the Communist Party of Poland, Ważyk belonged to a group of left-wing writers active in Warsaw in the 1930s. At the onset of World War II he escaped to Lwów in the Soviet occupied part of Poland, where he published articles for Czerwony Sztandar (Red Banner). Later, he joined the Berling Army as political officer. After the war he was a very influential person. Initially a strong supporter of communism he became very critical later on. His "Poem for Adults" marks the end of the socialist realism era in Polish literature.

== Career ==
During the War, Ważyk fought alongside Soviet troops on the Eastern Front, ending his military service with the victorious Lublin contingent. While still in the Polish Army, he founded Kuźnica, a Marxist literary weekly, which eventually merged with Nowa Kultura. Ważyk served as the editor of Kuźnica from 1946 to 1950, and from 1950 to 1954, he was editor of the literary journal Twórczość. Although Ważyk was initially a strong supporter of Stalinism, he eventually rejected it, and criticised the results of Stalinism in Poland, at the time of its impending disintegration.

=== A Poem for Adults ===
Ważyk is best remembered for A Poem for Adults ("Poemat dla dorosłych"), which he wrote in the summer of 1955, at the onset of Polish October revolution. The poem was published in the 21 August edition of Nowa Kultura, a Polish literary weekly based in Warsaw – an official publication of the Association of Polish Writers controlled by the Communists. The fifteen-part poem paints a picture of grim reality of life in the Stalinist Poland and the falsehood of dogmatic propaganda.

In part four, Ważyk speaks with open and deliberate contempt about the construction workers: a motley crew of outcasts crowding in shacks, barracks and hotels ("zbieraną hałastrą tłoczą się w szopach, barakach, hotelach") driven by their mongrel ambitions ("wielka migracja, skudlona ambicja") and dehumanizing the new Poland ("masa wędrowna, Polska nieczłowiecza"). The poem includes a memorable line in reference to French utopian socialist Fourier (part 12): They drink sea-water crying: lemonade! Return home secretly to vomit. It ends with a repeat call (part 15) for a just and congenial society built by the Communist Party ("Upominamy się na ziemi o ludzi spracowanych [...] upominamy się codziennie, upominamy się Partią").

The poem was an immediate success due to its strong critique of the Stalinist Poland. After publication, it was recognized as the strongest political criticism run by the communist controlled press thus far. As a result, the government fired the head of Nowa Kultura, Paweł Hoffmann, and made other changes to its staff. Ważyk was temporarily forced to remain silent. Newspapers and other official party organs were also instructed to denounce Ważyk and the poem. The association of Polish writers called a special session in order to condemn and expel Ważyk, however many writers supported Ważyk and he was not expelled.

Despite government efforts to censor the poem after its publication, it was widely read throughout Poland. The issue quickly sold out, and it began selling for high prices on the black market. Hand written copies of the poem were also widely circulated. The poem's publication gave Ważyk a tremendous amount of notoriety as a voice of dissent. He was praised not only for his eloquent critiques of the Stalinist regime, but also for his courage to make his views public. Ultimately disillusioned with Gomułka and Polish communism, Ważyk (along with many others) left the communist party in 1957. He worked as translator in the following years.
