= Marta Mirska =

Polish singer

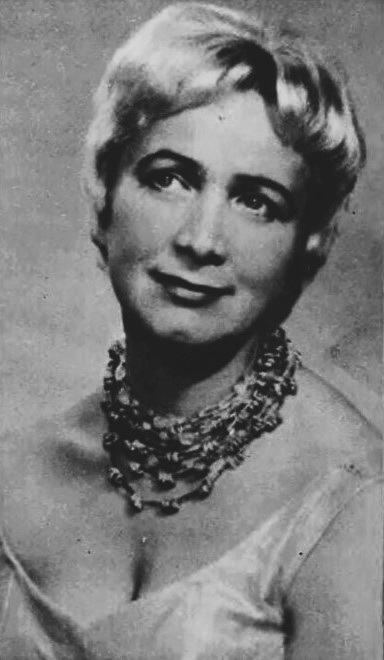
Marta Mirska in 1970s.

Marta Mirska (born Alicja Nowak February 12, 1918 in Warsaw – November 15, 1991) was a Polish singer active from 1940 to the mid-1960s. Her distinctive alto voice brought her to popular attention immediately before World War II. Her popularity peaked in the 1950s, with recordings on the Poznań-based Mewa and then the Polskie Nagrania labels. Her best-known song was Pierwszy siwy włos (First Gray Hair), a nostalgic tango written by Kazimierz Winkler and Henryk Hubertus Jabłoński originally for singer Mieczysław Fogg.

== Career ==
While still in Warsaw immediately before the outbreak of World War II, she became involved with the Ali Baba Theatre, established by the entertainer Kazimierz Krukowski. Wartime found her working as a courier in the underground Polish Armia Krajowa in the east of Poland. Under her cover name 'Marta', she entered and won a talent contest in Vilnius in 1940, after which she sang in the city at the popular nightclub Sztralla Artystów, as well as engagements in 1940-1941 with the orchestra of Ludwik Sempolinski and entertainer Janusz Minkiewicz's satirical cabaret "Ksantyp".

After the war, she settled in Lódź and began a long collaboration with the Lopatowski Brothers Orchestra that resulted in a string of recordings including the hits Czy pamiętasz tę noc w Zakopanem? (Do You Remember That Night In Zakopane?) and Wspominałam ten dzień (I Remembered That Day).

As her popularity grew, in 1950 Mirska received an invitation from Warsaw to work with the well-known Polish Radio Dance Orchestra. She accepted the offer, which gave her access to material created by the most talented and popular composers and songwriters of the day. Her plaintive and heart-felt interpretation of Pierwszy siwy włos (First Gray Hair) became a great radio hit in 1956, and became the most requested song at her concerts for the rest of her career. It was re-recorded in 1972 for release in an album (Polskie Nagrania XL 0833) of 12 selections drawn from her extensive repertoire. The song was also recorded in Czech after gaining regional popularity in Bratislava.

In addition to her radio work, Mirska recorded and performed through the remainder of the 1950s and in the early 1960s with numerous revues and variety shows, including the comedy revue Buffo. She sang with the Jan Cajmer Radio Orchestra and the Edward Czerny Dance Orchestra, and toured exhaustively throughout Poland. She also appeared in Warsaw with the German National Radio Orchestra (Kurt Henkels, conductor).

== Personal life ==
In Vilnius 1939, Mirska secretly married Jan Zielenewski, an officer in the Merchant Marine with whom she had corresponded since 1938, and with whom she described having fallen in love at first sight upon meeting him in Vilnius for the first time. The couple planned for a formal ceremony later, after his anticipated return from military exercises in Bydgoszcz to where he was posted. This never took place, as Zieleniewski died in the opening days of the September Campaign to repulse the Nazi aggression on Poland.

After the war, Mirska married Zbigniew Reiniger, the percussionist of the Lopatowski Brothers Orchestra. She remained heartbroken, however, for the rest of her life, often signing letters and correspondence as Marta Mirska-Zieleniewska-Reinigier or Marta Zieleniewski-Reiniger. She wrote poetry, after the end of her musical career; the poem 'Wspomnienie' (Reminiscence) was dedicated to her lost love Zieleniewski.

By the mid 1960s, Mirska's popularity waned due to changing musical tastes to which she did not adapt. She stopped recording and performing in 1966, at the age of 48, as her drinking and health problems began to take a toll. In her later years she lived a recluse, in relative poverty and neglect, looking after her husband who was paralysed after a stroke.

Mirska and Reiniger had no children; both died in 1991. She is buried at the Northern Communal Cemetery in Warsaw, section T, avenue XXI, row 16, no. 10). The grave marker mistakenly shows the name: Reinger.
