= Twórczość =

Polish literary journal

Twórczość (Polish pronunciation: [ˈtfur.t͡ʂɔɕt͡ɕ], Creativity, or Creative Output) is a Polish monthly literary journal, first published in 1945. Since 1 April 2000, Twórczość has been published by the state-funded Book Institute (Instytut Książki). It publishes poetry, fiction and literary criticism.

Adam Ważyk was editor in chief from 1950 to 1954, when he was succeeded by Jarosław Iwaszkiewicz. Other editors have included Andrzej Kijowski, writing under his pseudonym Daedalus, and Zdzisław Najder.

Nobel laureate Wisława Szymborska has contributed frequently to Twórczość from 1949 down to the present day. Czesław Miłosz published several of his most important works in Twórczość in 1945–1951, but after he defected to the West he did not appear in Twórczość again until 1978.

As of May 2025, Darek Foks is the editor-in-chief.
