= Janusz Minkiewicz =

Polish writer, translator, journalist and satirist

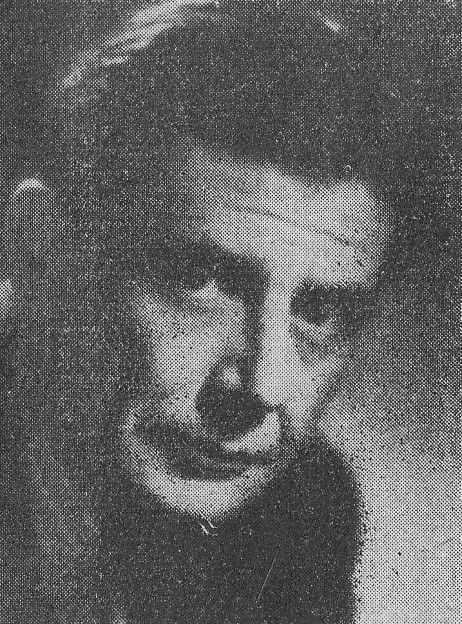
Jan Minkiewicz in the 1950s.

Janusz Minkiewicz (born June 25, 1914 in St. Petersburg – May 29, 1981 in Warsaw) was a Polish writer, translator, journalist and satirist.

Born in St. Petersburg, he graduated from the faculty of philosophy of the Warsaw University. Active in various journals, he was considered one of the heirs to the Skamander group of poets.

In 1939, he fled the Nazi-occupied part of Poland to Vilna, which was then returned to Lithuania. In 1940 (after the Soviet occupation of the city) he ran a satirical theatre, as well as the "Ksantypa" cabaret in Biały Sztral cafe.

Following the German take-over of the city in 1941, he moved back to Warsaw, where he collaborated with numerous officially approved theatres. After the war he became a noted translator of literature, mostly Russian. He collaborated with satiric journals Szpilki, Przekrój and Cyrulik Warszawski.
