= Mieczysław Jastrun =

Polish poet and essayist (1903–1983)

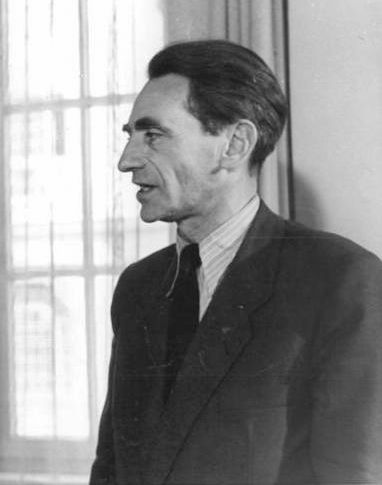
- Born: Mojsze Agatstein; 29 October 1903; Korolivka, Borshchiv Raion, Austria-Hungary
- Died: 22 February 1983 (aged 79); Warsaw, Poland
- Known for: poetry

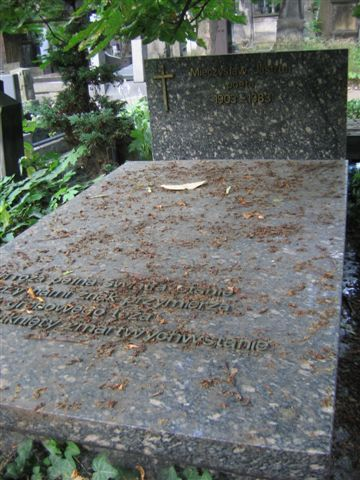
The grave of Mieczysław Jastrun at Powązki Cemetery, Warsaw.

Mieczysław Jastrun born Mojsze Agatstein (29 October 1903 – 22 February 1983) was a Polish poet and essayist of Jewish origin. The main themes of his poetry are philosophy and morality. He translated French, Russian, and German poetry to Polish.

== Life ==
Jastrun was born in Korolivka, Borshchiv Raion (in the former Eastern Galicia) into a Jewish family, the son of Józef Agatstein and Maria Agatstein née Nisensohn. He spent his childhood in Jodłowa, and went to public school in Ryglice, where his father had opened a surgery. The family moved several times to places where Joseph worked. Through 1915−1919 Mieczysław stayed in Kraków, where he went to gymnasium. Due to the onset of Polish–Soviet War he interrupted his studies and volunteered to the Polish Army. However, he did not participate in engagements as he contracted typhus. On 9 March 1920 together with his older brother, Jerzy Stanisław (later Jerzy Gierowski) he was baptised in the parish church in Jodłowa. He did not return to Kraków immediately and instead completed the last two high school forms in First General Liceum in Tarnów. During that time he lived in Pleśna, with his former governess (1921−1923).

Later during the 1920s, Jastrun studied Polish, German and philosophy at the Jagiellonian University in Kraków; he received a doctorate in 1929 upon dissertation Stosunek Wyspiańskiego do Słowackiego. He was also close to the Skamander group and wrote several works of poetry strongly influenced by symbolism. At the onset of World War II, Jastrun took refuge in Lviv, then occupied by the Soviet Union, where he worked as a teacher. After Nazi Germany occupied Lviv in 1941, he relocated to Warsaw, took the name Jan Klonowicz and worked as an underground teacher. Jastrun's Jewish identity remained undiscovered during the war, and he survived the Holocaust.

After the end of the war, Jastrun lived briefly in Lublin and Łódź before moving back to Warsaw in 1949. He joined the communist Polish United Workers' Party (PZPR), He left PZPR in 1957. and in the post-war era wrote several books dealing with the Nazi occupation and the Holocaust in the style of socialist realism. Jastrun also wrote biographies of Jan Kochanowski, Adam Mickiewicz and Juliusz Słowacki, translated works by poets such as Lorca, Pushkin, Hölderlin and Rilke into Polish, and taught modern poetry at the University of Warsaw.

In 1964 he was one of the signatories of the so-called Letter of 34 to Prime Minister Józef Cyrankiewicz regarding freedom of culture.

He was married to Mieczysława Buczkówna; their son was Tomasz Jastrun.

Jastrun died in Warsaw in 1983, and is buried at Powązki Cemetery.

== Works ==
=== Poetry ===
- Spotkanie w czasie. Warszawa: Ferdynand Hoesick. 1929.
- Dzieje nieostygłe. 1935.
- Strumień i milczenie. Kraków: Wydawnictwo J. Mortkowicza. 1937.
- Godzina strzeżona. Lublin: Związek Zawodowy Literatów Polskich. 1944.
- Rzecz ludzka. Warszawa: „Książka”. 1946.
- Sezon w Alpach i inne wiersze. Kraków: „Książka”. 1948.
- Barwy ziemi. Warszawa: Państwowy Instytut Wydawniczy. 1951.
- Poemat o mowie polskiej. Warszawa: Państwowy Instytut Wydawniczy. 1952.
- Poezja i prawda. Warszawa: Czytelnik. 1955.
- Genezy. Warszawa: Państwowy Instytut Wydawniczy. 1959.
- Większe od życia. Warszawa: Czytelnik. 1960.
- Intonacje. Warszawa: Państwowy Instytut Wydawniczy. 1962.
- Strefa owoców. Warszawa: Państwowy Instytut Wydawniczy. 1964.
- W biały dzień. Warszawa: Państwowy Instytut Wydawniczy. 1967.
- Godła pamięci. Warszawa: Państwowy Instytut Wydawniczy. 1969.
- Wyspa. Warszawa: Czytelnik. 1973.
- Błysk obrazu. Kraków: Wydawnictwo Literackie. 1975.
- Scena obrotowa. Kraków: Wydawnictwo Literackie. 1977.
- Punkty świecące. Warszawa: Państwowy Instytut Wydawniczy. 1980.
- Wiersze z jednego roku. Warszawa: Czytelnik. 1981.
- Fuga temporum. Warszawa: Państwowy Instytut Wydawniczy. 1986.

=== Essays, biographical sketches, texts on literature ===
- Mickiewicz. Warszawa: Państwowy Instytut Wydawniczy. 1949.
- Poeta i dworzanin. Rzecz o Janie Kochanowskim. Warszawa: Państwowy Instytut Wydawniczy. 1954.
- Wizerunki. Szkice literackie. Warszawa: Państwowy Instytut Wydawniczy. 1956.
- Między słowem a milczeniem. Warszawa: Państwowy Instytut Wydawniczy. 1960.
- Mit śródziemnomorski. Warszawa: Państwowy Instytut Wydawniczy. 1962.
- Wolność wyboru. Warszawa: Państwowy Instytut Wydawniczy. 1969.
- Sytuacja poezji. 1971.
- Gwiaździsty diament. Warszawa: Państwowy Instytut Wydawniczy. 1971.
- Walka o słowo. Warszawa: Czytelnik. 1973.
- Podróż do Grecji. Kraków: Wydawnictwo Literackie. 1978.
- Forma i sens poezji. Warszawa: Państwowy Instytut Wydawniczy. 1988.

=== Prose ===
- Spotkanie z Salomeą. Warszawa: Państwowy Instytut Wydawniczy. 1959. Novel about Juliusz Słowacki.
- Piękna choroba. Warszawa: Państwowy Instytut Wydawniczy. 1961. Autobiographical novel.
- Smuga światła. Warszawa: Państwowy Instytut Wydawniczy. 1983. Memoir.
- W innym miejscu, w innym czasie. Warszawa: Czytelnik. 1994. Short stories. Posthumously.
- Dzienniki 1955–1981. Kraków: Wydawnictwo Literackie. 2002.
- Pamięć i milczenie. Z rękopisów przygotował do druku A. Lam. Pułtusk: Wyższa Szkoła Humanistyczna im. A. Gieysztora. 2006. Posthumously.

== Accolades ==
- Gold Cross of Merit (8 May 1946)
- Order of the Banner of Labour, 1st class (22nd July 1949)
- Commander's Cross of the Order of Polonia Restituta (16 July 1954)
- Medal of the 10th Anniversary of People's Poland (19 January 1955)
