= Bierut =

Bierut is a surname. Notable people with the surname include:

- Bolesław Bierut (1892–1956), Polish politician, communist activist and leader of the Polish People's Republic between 1947 and 1956
- Michael Bierut (born 1957), a graphic designer, design critic and educator

== See also ==
- Beirut
