= Tomasz Jastrun =

Poet, writer and journalist (born 1950)

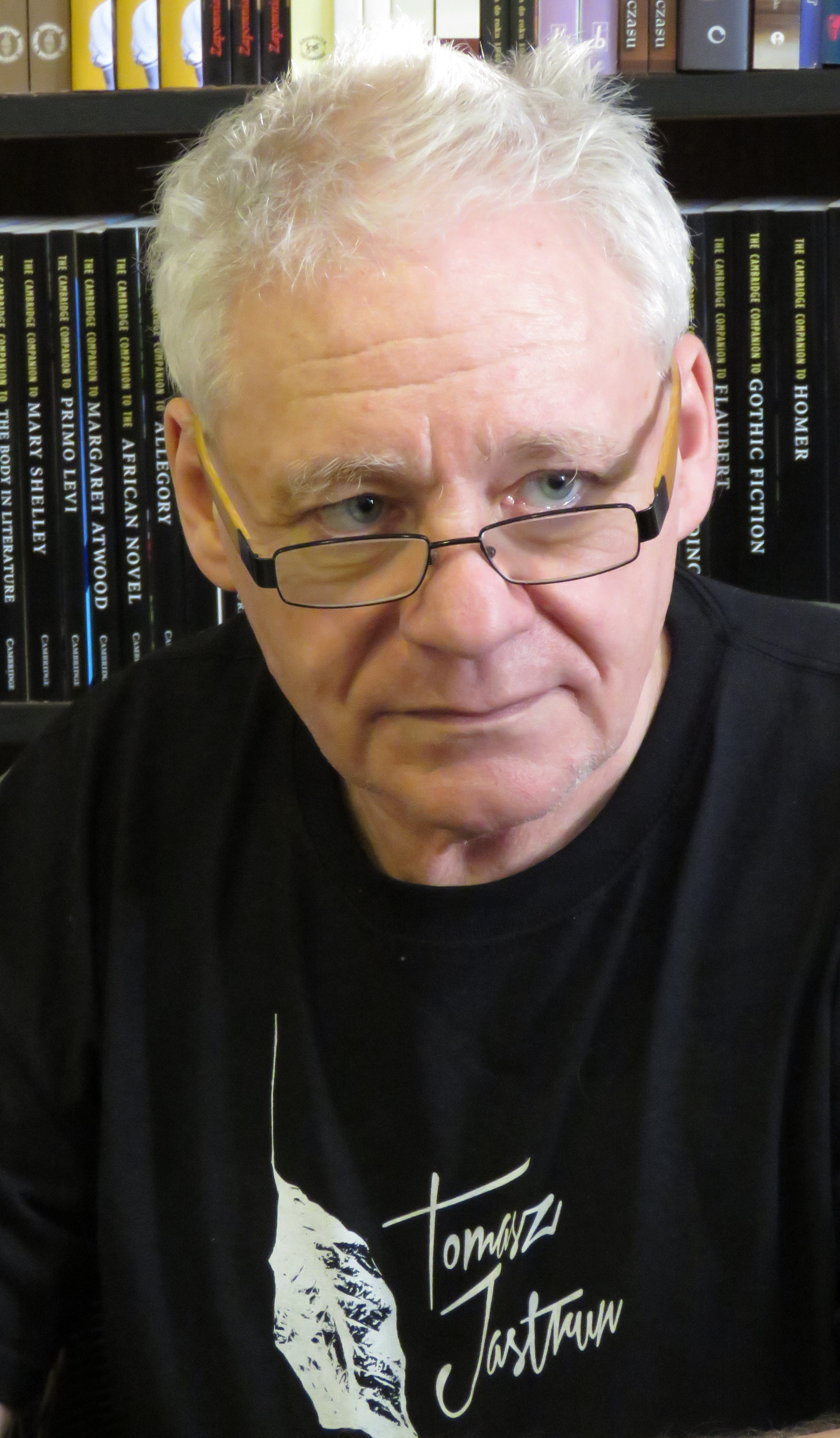
- Tomasz Jastrun (2016)
- Born: 15 September 1950
- Citizenship: Polish
- Occupations: Poet, writer, journalist

Tomasz Jastrun (born 15 September 1950) is a poet, novelist, non-fiction and children books writer and opinion journalist.

== Biography ==
The son of Mieczysław Jastrun and Mieczysława Buczkówna. In 1974 he graduated in Polish philology from the University of Warsaw. Since 1977, he has been running a distribution point for independent magazines and books in his apartment.

== Works ==
=== Poetry ===
- Bez usprawiedliwienia. Warszawa: Państwowy Instytut Wydawniczy. 1978.
- Promienie błędnego koła. Kraków: Wydawnictwo Literackie. 1980.
- Na skrzyżowaniu Azji i Europy. Warszawa: Niezależna Oficyna Wydawnicza. 1982.
- Biała łąka. Dziennik poetycki: 9 listopada – 23 grudnia 1982 roku. Warszawa: Biblioteka Tygodnika Wojennego. 1983.
- Kropla, kropla. Kraków: Wydawnictwo Literackie. 1985.
- Od prawie dwustu lat / Fast zweihundert Jahre schon. Translated by Ronge, Wanja. Berlin: Veto Verlag. 1988. Polish-German edition with afterword by Zbigniew Dominiak.
- Węzeł polski. Wiersze stare i nowe. Kraków: Społeczny Instytut Wydawniczy „Znak”. 1988.
- Obok siebie. Warszawa: Spółdzielnia Wydawnicza „Czytelnik”. 1989.
- 42 wiersze. Gdańsk: Wydawnictwo Marabut. 1995.
- Miłość-niemiłość i inne wiersze. Warszawa: Wydawnictwo „Iskry”. 1999.
- Tylko czułość idzie do nieba. Warszawa: Wydawnictwo „Iskry”. 2003.
- Powitania i pożegnania. Warszawa: Wydawnictwo „Iskry”. 2007.
- Jakby nigdy nic. Warszawa: Wydawnictwo „Iskry”. 2010.
- Przed zmierzchem. Warszawa: Wydawnictwo „Literackie M2”. 2021.
- Oddani istnieniu. Wiersze wybrane. Warszawa: Spółdzielnia Wydawnicza „Czytelnik”. 2025.

== Filmography ==
- Nasze podwórko (1980) – screenwriter

== Accolades ==
- Robert Graves Poetry Award for the volume Promienie błędnego koła (1980)
- Kościelski Award (1986)
- Knight's Cross of the Order of Polonia Restituta (2008)
- * Nomination to the Konstanty Ildefons Gałczyński “Orpheus” Poetry Award for the volume Przed zmierzchem (2022)
- Nomination to the Konstanty Ildefons Gałczyński “Orpheus” Poetry Award for the volume Epoka wymierania (2025)
