= Cold War (1953–1962) =

Phase of the Cold War during 1953–1962

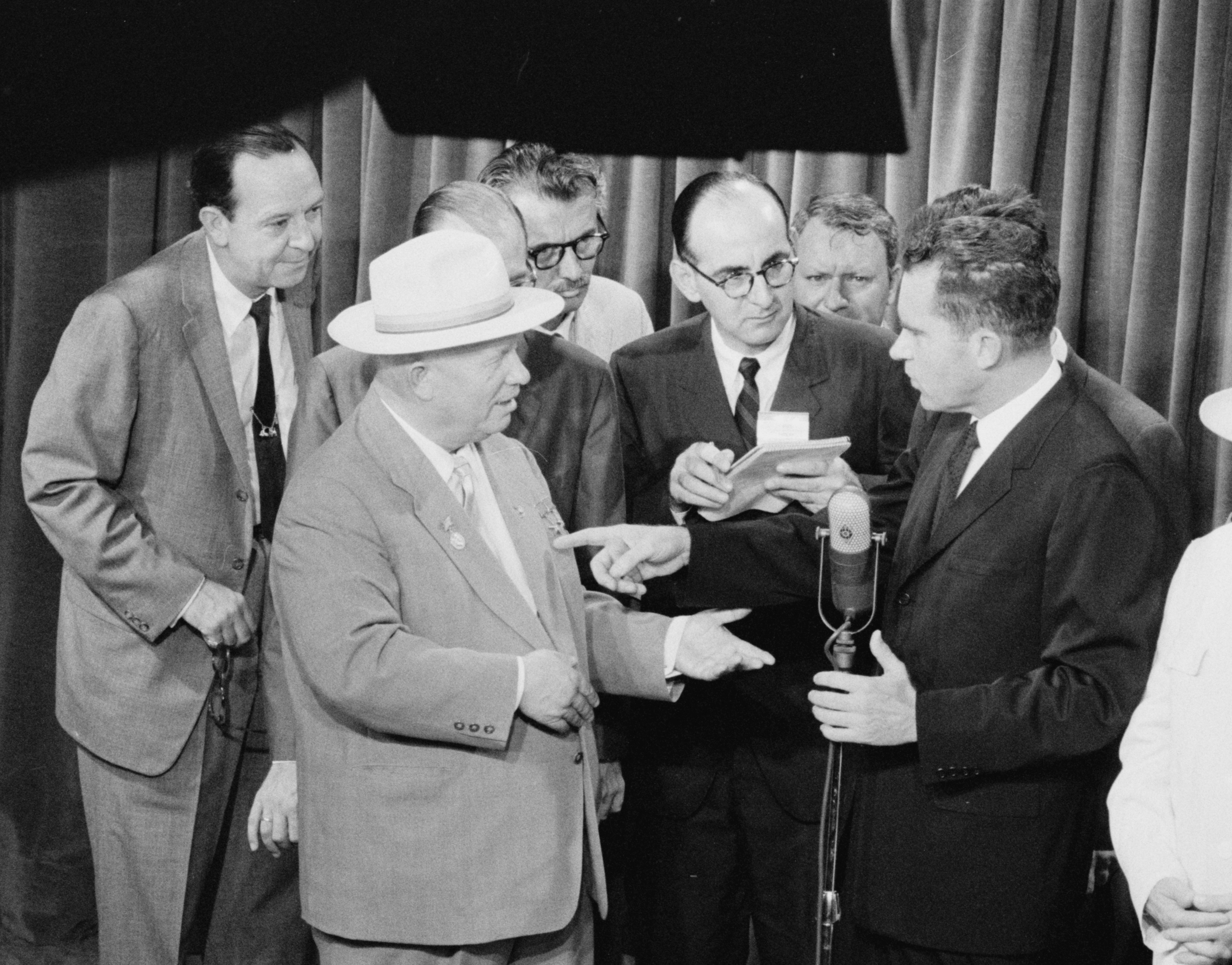
Soviet leader Nikita Khrushchev (left, with hat) and US Vice President Richard Nixon (right) debate the merits of communism versus capitalism in a model American kitchen at the American National Exhibition in Moscow (July 1959)

The Cold War (1953–1962) refers to the period in the Cold War between the end of the Korean War in 1953 and the Cuban Missile Crisis in 1962. It was marked by tensions and efforts at détente between the USA and Soviet Union.

After the death of Joseph Stalin in March 1953, Nikita Khrushchev rose to power, initiating the policy of De-Stalinization which caused political unrest in the Eastern Bloc and Warsaw Pact nations. Khrushchev's speech at the 20th Congress of the Communist Party in 1956 shocked domestic and international audiences, by denouncing Stalin’s personality cult and his regime's excesses.

Dwight D. Eisenhower succeeded Harry S. Truman as US President in 1953, but US foreign policy remained focused on containing Soviet influence. John Foster Dulles, Eisenhower’s Secretary of State, advocated for a doctrine of massive retaliation and brinkmanship, whereby the US would threaten overwhelming nuclear force in response to Soviet aggression. This strategy aimed to avoid the high costs of conventional warfare by relying heavily on nuclear deterrence.

Despite temporary reductions in tensions, such as the Austrian State Treaty and the 1954 Geneva Conference ending the First Indochina War, both superpowers continued their arms race and extended their rivalry into space with the launch of Sputnik 1 in 1957 by the Soviets. The Space Race and the nuclear arms buildup defined much of the competitive atmosphere during this period. The Cold War expanded to new regions, with the addition of African decolonization movements. The Congo Crisis in 1960 drew Cold War battle lines in Africa, as the Democratic Republic of the Congo became a Soviet ally, causing concern in the West. However, by the early 1960s, the Cold War reached its most dangerous point with the Cuban Missile Crisis in 1962, as the world stood on the brink of nuclear war.

== Eisenhower and Khrushchev ==
When Harry S. Truman was succeeded in office by Dwight D. Eisenhower as the 34th U.S. President in 1953, the Democrats lost their two-decades-long control of the U.S. presidency. Under Eisenhower, however, the United States' Cold War policy remained essentially unchanged. Whilst a thorough rethinking of foreign policy was launched (known as "Project Solarium"), the majority of emerging ideas (such as a "rollback of communism" and the liberation of Eastern Europe) were quickly regarded as unworkable. An underlying focus on the containment of Soviet communism remained to inform the broad approach of U.S. foreign policy.

While the transition from the Truman to the Eisenhower presidencies was a mild transition in character (from moderate to conservative), the change in the Soviet Union was immense. With the death of Joseph Stalin (who led the Soviet Union from 1928 and through the Great Patriotic War) in 1953, Georgy Malenkov was named leader of the Soviet Union. This was short lived however, as Nikita Khrushchev soon undercut all of Malenkov's authority as First Secretary of the Communist Party of the Soviet Union and took control of the Soviet Union himself. Malenkov joined a failed coup against Khrushchev in 1957, after which he was sent to Kazakhstan.

During a subsequent period of collective leadership, Khrushchev gradually consolidated his hold on power. At a speech to the closed session of the Twentieth Party Congress of the Communist Party of the Soviet Union, February 25, 1956, First Secretary Nikita Khrushchev shocked his listeners by denouncing Stalin's personality cult and the multiple crimes that occurred under Stalin's leadership. Although the contents of the speech were secret, it was leaked to outsiders, thus shocking both Soviet allies and Western observers. Khrushchev was later named premier of the Soviet Union in March 1958.

The effect of this speech on Soviet politics was immense. With it Khrushchev stripped his remaining Stalinist rivals of their legitimacy in a single stroke, dramatically boosting the First Party Secretary's domestic power. Khrushchev followed by easing restrictions, freeing some dissidents and initiating economic policies that emphasized commercial goods rather than just coal and steel production.

== U.S. strategy: "massive retaliation" and "brinksmanship" ==
=== Conflicting objectives ===
When Eisenhower entered office in 1953, he was committed to two possibly contradictory goals: maintaining—or even heightening—the national commitment to counter the spread of Soviet influence; and satisfying demands to balance the budget, lower taxes, and curb inflation. The most prominent of the doctrines to emerge from this goal was "massive retaliation", which Secretary of State John Foster Dulles announced early in 1954. Eschewing the costly, conventional ground forces of the Truman administration, and wielding the vast superiority of the U.S. nuclear arsenal and covert intelligence, Dulles defined this approach as "brinksmanship" in a January 16, 1956, interview with Life: pushing the Soviet Union to the brink of war in order to exact concessions.

Eisenhower inherited from the Truman administration a military budget of roughly US$42 billion, as well as a paper (NSC-141) drafted by Acheson, Harriman, and Lovett calling for an additional $7–9 billion in military spending. With Treasury Secretary George Humphrey leading the way, and reinforced by pressure from Senator Robert A. Taft and the cost-cutting mood of the Republican Congress, the target for the new fiscal year (to take effect on July 1, 1954) was reduced to $36 billion. While the Korean armistice was on the verge of producing significant savings in troop deployment and money, the State and Defense Departments were still in an atmosphere of rising expectations for budgetary increases. Humphrey wanted a balanced budget and a tax cut in February 1955, and had a savings target of $12 billion (obtaining half of this from cuts in military expenditures).

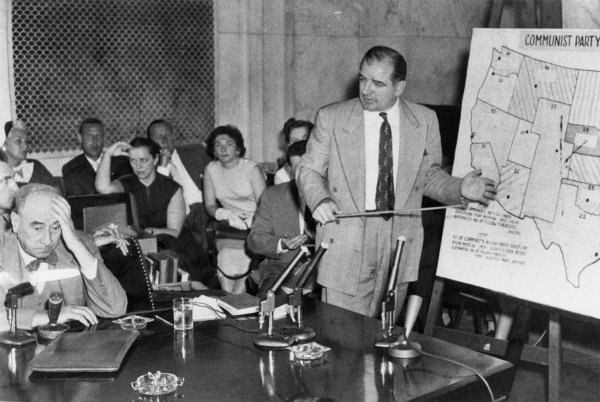
Joseph N. Welch (left) being questioned by Senator Joseph McCarthy (right), June 9, 1954

Although unwilling to cut deeply into defense, the President also wanted a balanced budget and smaller defense allocations. "Unless we can put things in the hands of people who are starving to death we can never lick communism", he told his cabinet. With this in mind, Eisenhower continued funding for America's innovative cultural diplomacy initiatives throughout Europe which included goodwill performances by the "soldier-musician ambassadors" of the Seventh Army Symphony Orchestra. Moreover, Eisenhower feared that a bloated "military–industrial complex" (a term he popularized) "would either drive U.S. to war—or into some form of dictatorial government" and perhaps even force the U.S. to "initiate war at the most propitious moment." On one occasion, the former commander of the greatest amphibious invasion force in history privately exclaimed, "God help the nation when it has a President who doesn't know as much about the military as I do."

In the meantime, however, attention was being diverted elsewhere in Asia. The continuing pressure from the "China lobby" or "Asia firsters", who had insisted on active efforts to restore Chiang Kai-shek to power was still a strong domestic influence on foreign policy. In April 1953 Senator Robert A. Taft and other powerful Congressional Republicans suddenly called for the immediate replacement of the top chiefs of the Pentagon, particularly the Chairman of the Joint Chiefs of Staff, Omar Bradley. To the so-called "China lobby" and Taft, Bradley was seen as having leanings toward a Europe-first orientation, meaning that he would be a possible barrier to new departures in military policy that they favored. Another factor was the vitriolic accusations of McCarthyism, where large portions of the U.S. government allegedly contained covert communist agents or sympathizers. But after the mid-term elections in 1954–and censure by the Senate–the influence of Joseph McCarthy ebbed after his unpopular accusations against the Army.

=== Eisenhower administration strategy ===
I think most of our people cannot understand that we are actually at war. They need to hear shells. They are not psychologically prepared for the concept that you can have a war when you don't have actual fighting.

— Admiral Hyman G. Rickover addressing U.S. Senate Committee on Defense Preparedness on January 6, 1958

1958 deployment of U.S. atomic weapons in Korea, while reducing the size of conventional forces

Eisenhower's farewell address, January 17, 1961. Length 15:30.

The administration attempted to reconcile the conflicting pressures from the "Asia firsters" and pressures to cut federal spending while continuing to fight the Cold War effectively. On May 8, 1953, the President and his top advisors tackled this problem in "Operation Solarium", named after the White House sunroom where the president conducted secret discussions. Although it was not traditional to ask military men to consider factors outside their professional discipline, the President instructed the group to strike a proper balance between his goals to cut government spending and an ideal military posture.

The group weighed three policy options for the next year's military budget: the Truman-Acheson approach of containment and reliance on conventional forces; threatening to respond to limited Soviet "aggression" in one location with nuclear weapons; and serious "liberation" based on an economic response to the Soviet political-military-ideological challenge to Western hegemony: propaganda campaigns and psychological warfare. The third option was strongly rejected. Eisenhower and the group (consisting of Allen Dulles, Walter Bedell Smith, C.D. Jackson, and Robert Cutler) instead opted for a combination of the first two, one that confirmed the validity of containment, but with reliance on the American air-nuclear deterrent. This was geared toward avoiding costly and unpopular ground wars, such as Korea.

The Eisenhower administration viewed atomic weapons as an integral part of U.S. defense, hoping that they would bolster the relative capabilities of the U.S. vis-à-vis the Soviet Union. The administration also reserved the prospects of using them, in effect, as a weapon of first resort, hoping to gain the initiative while reducing costs. By wielding the nation's nuclear superiority, the new Eisenhower-Dulles approach was a cheaper form of containment geared toward offering Americans "more bang for the buck".

Thus, the administration increased the number of nuclear warheads from 1,000 in 1953 to 18,000 by early 1961. Despite overwhelming U.S. superiority, one additional nuclear weapon was produced each day. The administration also exploited new technology. In 1955 the eight-engined B-52 Stratofortress bomber, the first true jet bomber designed to carry nuclear weapons, was developed.

In 1961, the U.S. deployed 15 Jupiter IRBMs (intermediate-range ballistic missiles) at İzmir, Turkey, aimed at the western USSR's cities, including Moscow. Given its 1,500-mile (2,410 km) range, Moscow was only 16 minutes away. The U.S. could also launch 1,000-mile (1,600 km)-range Polaris SLBMs from submerged submarines.

In 1962, the United States had more than eight times as many bombs and missile warheads as the USSR: 27,297 to 3,332.

During the Cuban Missile Crisis the U.S. had 142 Atlas and 62 Titan I ICBMs, mostly in hardened underground silos.

=== Fear of Soviet influence and nationalism ===
Allen Dulles, along with most U.S. foreign policy-makers of the era, considered a number of Third World nationalists and "revolutionaries" as being essentially under the influence, if not control, of the Warsaw Pact. Ironically, in War, Peace, and Change (1939), he had called Mao Zedong an "agrarian reformer", and during World War II he had deemed Mao's followers "the so called 'Red Army faction'". But he no longer recognized indigenous roots in the Chinese Communist Party by 1950. In War or Peace, an influential work denouncing the containment policies of the Truman administration, and espousing an active program of "liberation", he writes:

Thus the 450,000,000 people in China have fallen under leadership that is violently anti-American, and takes its inspiration and guidance from Moscow... Soviet Communist leadership has won a victory in China which surpassed what Japan was seeking and we risked war to avert.

Behind the scenes, Dulles could explain his policies in terms of geopolitics. But publicly, he used the moral and religious reasons that he believed Americans preferred to hear, even though he was often criticized by observers at home and overseas for his strong language.

Two of the leading figures of the interwar and early Cold War period who viewed international relations from a "realist" perspective, diplomat George Kennan and theologian Reinhold Niebuhr, were troubled by Dulles' moralism and the method by which he analyzed Soviet behavior. Kennan disagreed with the notion that the Soviets even had a world design after Stalin's death, being far more concerned with maintaining control of their own bloc. However, the underlying assumptions of a monolithic world communism, directed from the Kremlin, of the Truman-Acheson containment after the drafting of NSC-68 were essentially compatible with those of the Eisenhower-Dulles foreign policy. The conclusions of Paul Nitze's National Security Council policy paper were as follows:

What is new, what makes the continuing crisis, is the polarization of power which inescapably confronts the slave society with the free... the Soviet Union, unlike previous aspirants to hegemony, is animated by a new fanatic faith, antithetical to our own, and seeks to impose its absolute authority... [in] the Soviet Union and second in the area now under [its] control... In the minds of the Soviet leaders, however, achievement of this design requires the dynamic extension of their authority... To that end Soviet efforts are now directed toward the domination of the Eurasian land mass.

== The end of the Korean War ==
Prior to his election in 1953, Dwight D. Eisenhower was already displeased with the manner that Harry S. Truman had handled the war in Korea. After the United States secured a resolution from the United Nations to engage in military defense on behalf of South Korea led by the president Syngman Rhee, who had been invaded by North Korea in an attempt to unify all of Korea under the communist North Korean regime led by the dictator Kim Il-sung. President Truman engaged U.S. land, air, and sea forces; United States involvement in the war quickly reversed the direction of military advancement into South Korea to military advancement into North Korea; to the point that North Korean forces were being forced against the border with China, which led to the involvement of hundreds of thousands of communist Chinese troops heavily assaulting U.S. and South Korean forces. Acting on a campaign pledge made during his United States presidential election campaign, Eisenhower visited Korea on December 2, 1952, to assess to the situation. Eisenhower's investigation consisted of meeting with South Korean troops, commanders, and government officials, after his meetings Eisenhower concluded, "we could not stand forever on a static front and continue to accept casualties without any visible results. Small attacks on small hills would not end this war". Eisenhower urged the South Korean President Syngman Rhee to compromise in order to speed up peace talks. This, coupled with the United States' threat of using nuclear weapons if the war did not end soon, led to the signing of an armistice on July 27, 1953. The armistice concluded the United States' initial Cold War concept of "limited war". Prisoners of war were allowed to choose where they would stay, either the area that would become North Korea or the area to become South Korea, and a border was placed between the two territories in addition to an allotted demilitarized zone. The "police action" implemented by the Korean U.N. agreement prevented communism from spreading from North Korea to South Korea. United States involvement in the Korean War demonstrated its readiness to the world to rally to the aid of nations under invasion, particularly communistic invasion, and resulted in President Eisenhower's empowered image as an effective leader against tyranny; this ultimately led to a strengthened position of the United States in Europe and guided the development of the North Atlantic Treaty Organization. The primary effect of these developments for the United States were the military buildup called for in response to Cold War concerns as seen in NSC 68.

== Origins of the Space Race ==
The Space Race between the United States and the Soviet Union was an integral component of the Cold War. Contrary to the Nuclear arms race, it was a peaceful competition in which the two powers could demonstrate their technological and theoretical advancements over the other. The Soviet Union was the first nation to enter the space realm with their launch of Sputnik 1 on October 4, 1957. The satellite was merely an 83.6-kilogram aluminum alloy sphere, which was a major downsize from the original 1,000-kilogram design, that carried a radio and four antennas into space. This size was shocking to western scientists as America was designing a much smaller 8-kilogram satellite. This size discrepancy was apparent due to the gap in weapon technology as the United States was able to develop much smaller nuclear warheads than their Soviet counterparts. The Soviet Union later launched Sputnik 2 less than a month later. The Soviet's satellite success caused a stir in America as people question why the United States had fallen behind the Soviet Union and if they could launch nuclear missiles at large American cities i.e. Chicago, Seattle, and Atlanta. President Dwight D. Eisenhower responded by creating the President's Science Advisory Committee (PSAC). This committee was appointed to lead the United States in policy for scientific and defense strategies. Another United States response to the Soviets' successful satellite mission was a Navy led attempt to launch the first American satellite into space using its Vanguard TV3 missile. This effort resulted in complete failure however, with the missile exploding on the launch pad. These developments resulted in a media frenzy, a frustrated and perplexed American public, and a struggle between the United States Army and Navy for control of the efforts to launch an American satellite into space. To resolve this, President Dwight D. Eisenhower appointed his President's Science Advisor, James Rhyne Killian, to consult with the PSAC to develop a solution.

=== Creation of NASA ===
In reaction to the launch of Sputnik 1 by the Soviet Union, the President's Science Advisory Committee advised President Dwight D. Eisenhower to convert National Advisory Committee for Aeronautics into a new organization that would be more progressive in the United States' efforts for space exploration and research. This organization was to be named the National Aeronautics and Space Administration (NASA). This agency would effectively shift the control of space research and travel from the military into the hands of NASA, which was to be a civilian-government administration. NASA was to be in charge of all non-military space activity, while another organization (DARPA) was to be responsible for space travel and technology intended for military use.

On April 2, 1958, Eisenhower presented legislation to Congress to implement the creation of the National Aeronautics and Space Agency. Congress responded by supplementing the creation of NASA, with an additional committee to be called the National Aeronautics and Space Council (NASC). The NASC would include the Secretary of State, the Secretary of Defense, the head of the Atomic Energy Commission, and the administrator of NASA. Legislation was passed by Congress, and then signed by President Eisenhower on July 29, 1958. NASA began operations on October 1, 1958.

=== Kennedy's space administration ===
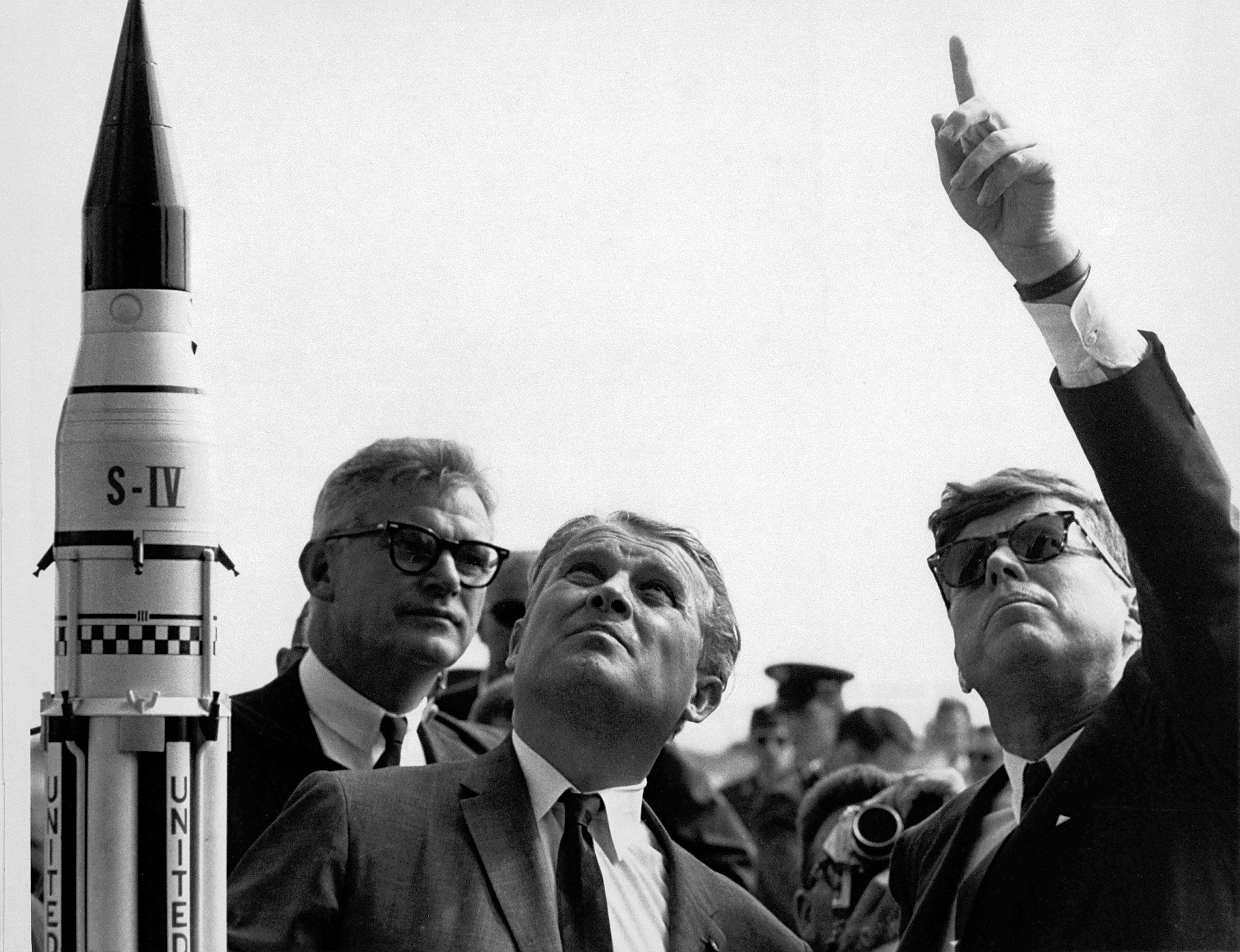
Space architect Wernher von Braun with President John F. Kennedy, 1963

Since the conception of NASA, there had been considerations about the possibility of flying a man to the Moon. On July 5, 1961, the "Research Steering Committee on Manned Spaceflight", led by George Low presented the concept of the Apollo program to the NASA "Space Exploration Council". Although under the Dwight D. Eisenhower presidential administration NASA was given little authority to further explore space travel, it was proposed that after the crewed Earth-orbiting missions, Project Mercury, that the government-civilian administration should make efforts to successfully complete a crewed lunar spaceflight mission. NASA administrator T. Keith Glennan explained that President Dwight D. Eisenhower, restricted any further space exploration beyond Project Mercury. After John F. Kennedy had been elected as president the previous November, policy for space exploration underwent a revolutionary change.

"This nation should commit itself to the achieving the goal, before this decade is out, of landing a man on the Moon and returning him safely to Earth" -John F. Kennedy

After President John F. Kennedy made this proposal to Congress on May 25, 1961, he remained true to this commitment to send a crewed lunar spaceflight in the ensuing 30 months prior to his assassination. Directly after his proposal, there was an 89% increase in government funding for NASA, followed by a 101% increase in funding the subsequent year. This marked the beginning of the United States' mission to the Moon.

=== The Soviet Union in the Space Race ===
In August 1957 the Soviet Union tested the world's first successful Intercontinental ballistic missile (ICBM), the R7 Semyorka. Within only two months of the launch of the Semyorka, Sputnik 1 became the first human made object in Earth's orbit. This was followed by the launch of Sputnik II which carried Laika the first living space traveler though she did not survive the trip. This led to the creation of the Vostok programme in 1960 and the first living creatures to survive the trip to space, Belka and Strelka the Soviet space dogs. The Vostok Program was responsible for placing the first human in space, yet another task that the Soviet Union would complete before the United States.

==== The R7 ICBM ====
Prior to the start of the space race, the Soviet Union and the United States were struggling to build and obtain a missile that could not only carry nuclear cargo, but could also travel effectively from one country to another. These missiles, also known as ICBMs or Intercontinental Ballistic Missile, were key for either country to gain a major strategical advantage in the early years of the Cold War. However, where the U.S. failed in their initial ICBM flight tests, the Soviets proved to be years ahead in ICBM technology with their R7 program. The R7 missile, first tested in October 1953, originally was designed to carry a nose cone plus nuclear cargo equal to 3 tons, maintain a flight range of 7000 to 8000 km, a launch weight of 170 tons, and a two-stage launch and flight system. However, during the initial testing, the R7 ICBM proved too small for the required cargo and major changes were approved and implemented in May 1954. These changes consisted of a heavier nose that could carry 3 tons of nuclear payload and a design change that would allow for a controlled take off and flight due to the new launch weight being 280 tons. This rocket proved effective in testing in May 1957 and was then slightly adjusted to support space flight.

==== Sputnik 1 and Sputnik 2 ====
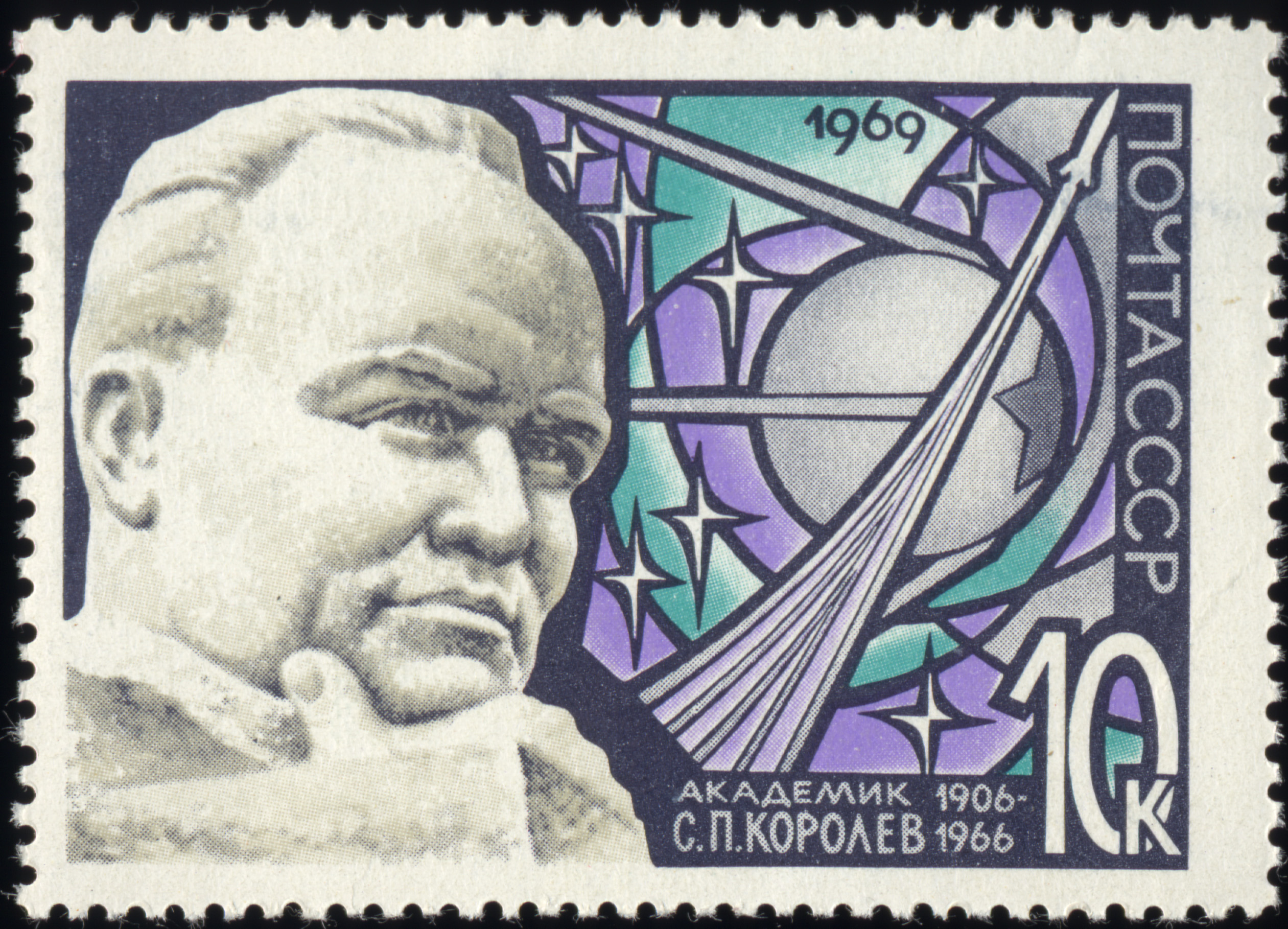
Soviet rocket engineer Sergei Korolev and Sputnik 1 on a 1969 Soviet stamp

On October 4, 1957, the Soviet Union successfully launched the first Earth satellite into space. Sputnik 1's official mission was to send back data from space, however the effects of this launch were monumental for both the USSR and the United States. For both countries, the launch of Sputnik 1 sparked the start of the Timeline of the Space Race. It created a curiosity for space flight and a relatively peaceful competition to the Moon. However the initial effects of Sputnik 1 for the United States was not a matter of exploration, but a matter of national security. What the USSR proved to the world, and mainly the United States, was that they were capable of launching a missile into space and potentially an ICBM carrying nuclear cargo at the United States. The fear of the unknown capability of Sputnik sparked fear in the Americans and a number of government officials went on record giving their thoughts on the matter. Senator Jackson of Seattle said the launch of Sputnik "was a devastating blow", and that "[President] Eisenhower should declare a week of shame and danger". For the Russians' the launch of Sputnik 1 proved to be a major advantage in the Cold War, because it secured their current leading position in the war, created a retaliation force in the event of a U.S. nuclear strike, and allowed for a competitive advantage in ICBM technology.

Sputnik 2 launched almost a month later on November 3, 1957, with a mission goal of carrying the first dog, Laika, into Earth orbit. This mission, though unsuccessful in the sense that Laika did not survive the mission, further established the USSR's position in the Cold War. Not only were the Soviets capable of launching a missile into space, but they could continue to complete successful space launches before the United States could complete one launch.

==== Lunar missions ====
The USSR launched three Lunar missions in 1959. The Lunar missions were the Russian equivalent to the United States Project Mercury and Project Gemini space programs, whose primary mission was to prepare to put the first human on the Moon. The first of the Lunar missions was Luna 1, which launched on January 2, 1959. Its successful mission established the first rocket engine restart within Earth orbit and the first man-made object to establish heliocentric orbit. Luna 2, which launched on September 14, 1959, established the first impact into another celestial body (the Moon). Finally, Luna 3 launched on October 7, 1959, and took the first pictures of the dark side of the Moon. After these three missions in 1959, the Soviets continued their exploration of the Moon and its environment in 21 other Luna missions.

==== Soviet space travel from 1960–1962 ====
The Luna ("Moon") program was a giant step forward for the Soviets in achieving the goal of putting the first man on the Moon. It also "planted the building blocks" of a program for the Soviets to "sustain human beings safely and productively in low Earth orbit" with the creation of the Soviet "equivalent to the Apollo command module, the Soyuz space capsule".

Over this two-year period, the Soviets were taking major steps forward in getting to the Moon with one mission set back, Sputnik 4. This mission was launched officially as a test of life support systems for future cosmonauts on May 15, 1960. However, on May 19, "an attempt to deorbit a space cabin failed" and sent the cabin into high Earth orbit, only for it to crash into the Earth in September of the same year. The Soviets continued their space program, however by launching Sputnik 5 on August 19, 1960, which carried the first animals and plants to space and return them safely to Earth.

Other notable launches include:

- Vostok 1: Launched on April 12, 1961. Successfully carried the first human into space, Yuri Gagarin, and completed the first crewed orbital flight.
- Vostok 2: Launched August 6, 1961. Successfully carried the first crewed mission lasting one day carrying Gherman Titov.
- Vostok 3 and Vostok 4: Launched August 12, 1962. Vostok 3 carried Andriyan Nikolayev and Vostok 4 carried Pavel Popovich. Successfully completed the first dual crewed space flight, the first ship-to-ship radio contact and first simultaneous flight of crewed spacecraft.

=== The race continues ===
The Soviet Union continued to extend its lead in the space race with its mission on April 12, 1961, which made Soviet cosmonaut Yuri Gagarin the first human being to leave Earth's atmosphere and enter space. The United States gained some ground a month later, on May 15, 1961, when they sent Alan Shepard on a fifteen-minute flight outside of Earth's atmosphere during the Freedom 7 project. On February 20, 1962, America made further progress as John Glenn became the first American to orbit the Earth in his Mercury mission Friendship 7.

== Soviet strategy ==
In 1960 and 1961, Khrushchev tried to impose the concept of nuclear deterrence on the military. Nuclear deterrence holds that the reason for having nuclear weapons is to discourage their use by a potential enemy, with each side deterred from war because of the threat of its escalation into a nuclear conflict, Khrushchev believed, "peaceful coexistence" with capitalism would become permanent and allow the inherent superiority of socialism to emerge in economic and cultural competition with the West.

Khrushchev hoped that exclusive reliance on the nuclear firepower of the newly created Strategic Rocket Forces would remove the need for increased defense expenditures. He also sought to use nuclear deterrence to justify his massive troop cuts; his downgrading of the Ground Forces, traditionally the "fighting arm" of the Soviet armed forces; and his plans to replace bombers with missiles and the surface fleet with nuclear missile submarines. However, during the Cuban Missile Crisis the USSR had only four R-7 Semyorkas and a few R-16s intercontinental missiles deployed in vulnerable surface launchers. In 1962 the Soviet submarine fleet had only 8 submarines with short range missiles, which could be launched only from submarines that surfaced and lost their hidden submerged status.

Khrushchev's attempt to introduce a nuclear 'doctrine of deterrence' into Soviet military thought failed. Discussion of nuclear war in the first authoritative Soviet monograph on strategy since the 1920s, Marshal Vasilii Sokolovskii's "Military Strategy" (published in 1962, 1963, and 1968) and in the 1968 edition of Marxism-Leninism on War and the Army, focused upon the use of nuclear weapons for fighting rather than for deterring a war. Should such a war break out, both sides would pursue the most decisive aims with the most forceful means and methods. Intercontinental ballistic missiles and aircraft would deliver massed nuclear strikes on the enemy's military and civilian objectives. The war would assume an unprecedented geographical scope, but Soviet military writers argued that the use of nuclear weapons in the initial period of the war would decide the course and outcome of the war as a whole. Both in doctrine and in strategy, the nuclear weapon reigned supreme.

== Mutual assured destruction ==
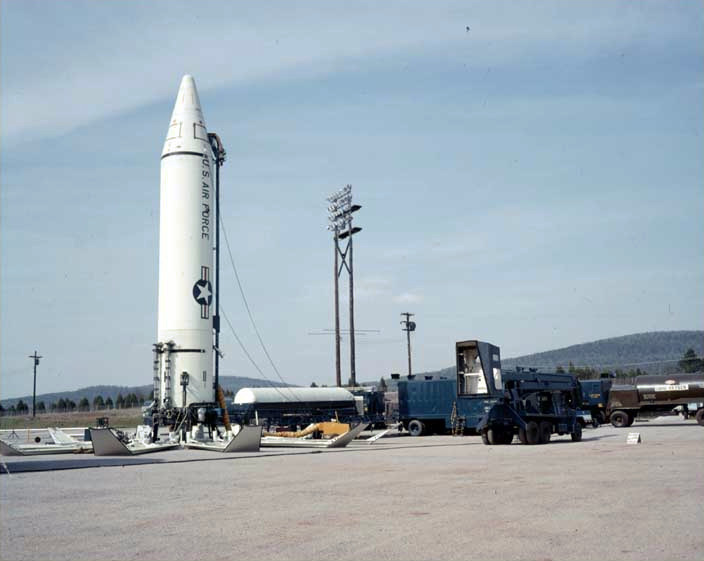
More than 100 U.S.-built missiles having the capability to strike Moscow with nuclear warheads were deployed in Italy and Turkey in 1961

An important part of developing stability was based on the concept of Mutual assured destruction (MAD). While the Soviets acquired atomic weapons in 1949, it took years for them to reach parity with the United States. In the meantime, the Americans developed the hydrogen bomb, which the Soviets matched during the era of Khrushchev. New methods of delivery such as Submarine-launched ballistic missiles and Intercontinental ballistic missiles with MIRV warheads meant that both superpowers could easily devastate the other, even after attack by an enemy.

This fact often made leaders on both sides extremely reluctant to take risks, fearing that some small flare-up could ignite a war that would wipe out all of human civilization. Nonetheless, leaders of both nations pressed on with military and espionage plans to prevail over the other side. At the same time, different avenues were pursued to try to advance their causes; these began to encompass athletics (with the Olympics becoming a battleground between ideologies as well as athletes) and culture (with respective countries supporting pianists, chess players, and movie directors).

One of the most important forms of nonviolent competition was the space race. The Soviets jumped out to an early lead in 1957 with the launching of Sputnik, the first artificial satellite, followed by the first crewed flight. The success of the Soviet space program was a great shock to the United States, which had believed itself to be ahead technologically. The ability to launch objects into orbit was especially ominous because it showed Soviet missiles could target anywhere on the planet.

Soon the Americans had a space program of their own but remained behind the Soviets until the mid-1960s. American President John F. Kennedy launched an unprecedented effort, promising that by the end of the 1960s Americans would land a man on the Moon, which they did, thus beating the Soviets to one of the more important objectives in the space race.

Another alternative to outright battle was the shadow war that was taking place in the world of espionage. There was a series of shocking spy scandals in the west, most notably that involving the Cambridge Five. The Soviets had several high-profile defections to the west, such as the Petrov Affair. Funding for the KGB, CIA, MI6 and smaller organizations such as the Stasi increased greatly as their agents and influence spread around the world.

In 1957 the CIA started the program of reconnaissance flights over the USSR using Lockheed U-2 spy planes. When such a plane was brought down over the Soviet Union on May 1, 1960 (1960 U-2 incident) at first the United States government denied the plane's purpose and mission, but was forced to admit its role as a surveillance aircraft when the Soviet government revealed that it had captured the pilot, Gary Powers, alive and was in possession of its largely intact remains. Coming just over two weeks before a scheduled East-West Summit in Paris, the incident caused a collapse in the talks and a marked deterioration in relations.

== Eastern Bloc events ==
As the Cold War became an accepted element of the international system, the battlegrounds of the earlier period began to stabilize. A de facto buffer zone between the two camps was set up in Central Europe. In the south, Yugoslavia became heavily allied with the other European communist states. Meanwhile, Austria had become neutral.

=== 1953 East Germany uprising ===
Following large numbers of East Germans traveling west through the only "loophole" left in the Eastern Bloc emigration restrictions, the Berlin sector border, the East German government then raised "norms"—the amount each worker was required to produce—by 10%. This was an attempt to transform East Germany into a satellite state of the Soviet Union. Already disaffected East Germans, who could see the relative economic successes of West Germany within Berlin, became enraged, provoking large street demonstrations and strikes. Nearly a million Germans partook in the protests and riots that took place at this time. A major emergency was declared and the Soviet Army intervened.

=== Creation of the Warsaw Pact ===
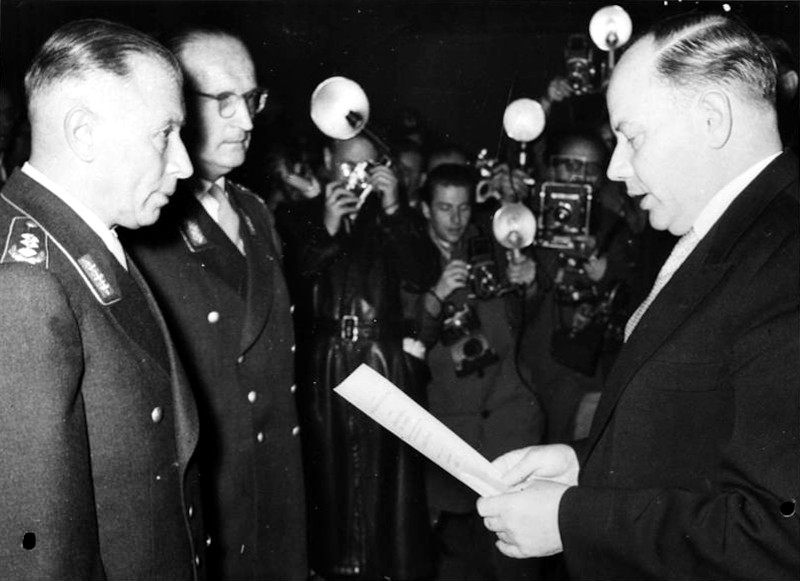
Generals Adolf Heusinger and Hans Speidel sworn into the newly founded West German Bundeswehr on 12 November 1955

In 1955, the Warsaw Pact was formed partly in response to NATO's inclusion of West Germany and partly because the Soviets needed an excuse to retain Red Army units in potentially problematic Hungary. For 35 years, the Pact perpetuated the Stalinist concept of Soviet national security based on imperial expansion and control over satellite regimes in Eastern Europe. Through its institutional structures, the Pact also compensated in part for the absence of Joseph Stalin's personal leadership, which had manifested itself since his death in 1953. While Europe remained a central concern for both sides throughout the Cold War, by the end of the 1950s the situation was frozen. Alliance obligations and the concentration of forces in the region meant that any incident could potentially lead to an all-out war, and both sides thus worked to maintain the status quo. Both the Warsaw Pact and NATO maintained large militaries and modern weapons to possibly defeat the other military alliance.

=== 1956 Polish protests ===
After the death of the Soviet leader Joseph Stalin, the communist regime in Poland relaxed some of its policies. This led to a desire within the Polish public for more radical reforms of this kind, though the majority of Polish officials did not share this desire and were hesitant to reform. This caused impatience among industrial workers who began to strike; demanding better wages, lower work quotas, and cheaper food. 30,000 demonstrators carried banners demanding "Bread and Freedom". Władysław Gomułka headed up the protests as the new leader of the Polish Communist party.

In Poland, demonstrations by workers demanding better conditions began on June 28, 1956, at Poznań's Cegielski Factories and were met with violent repression after Soviet Officer Konstantin Rokossovsky ordered the military to suppress the uprising. A crowd of approximately 100,000 gathered in the city center near the UB secret police building. 400 tanks and 10,000 soldiers of the Polish Army under General Stanislav Poplavsky were ordered to suppress the demonstration and during the pacification fired at the protesting civilians. The death toll was placed between 57 and 78 people, including 13-year-old Romek Strzałkowski. There were also hundreds of people who sustained a variety of injuries.

=== Hungarian Revolution of 1956 ===
After Stalinist dictator Mátyás Rákosi was replaced by Imre Nagy following Stalin's death and Polish reformist Władysław Gomułka was able to enact some reformist requests, large numbers of protesting Hungarians compiled a list of Demands of Hungarian Revolutionaries of 1956, including free secret-ballot elections, independent tribunals, and inquiries into Stalin and Rákosi Hungarian activities. Under the orders of Soviet defense minister Georgy Zhukov, Soviet tanks entered Budapest. Protester attacks at the Parliament forced the collapse of the government.

The new government that came to power during the revolution formally disbanded the Hungarian secret police, declared its intention to withdraw from the Warsaw Pact and pledged to re-establish free elections. The Soviet Politburo thereafter moved to crush the revolution with a large Soviet force invading Budapest and other regions of the country. Approximately 200,000 Hungarians fled Hungary, some 26,000 Hungarians were put on trial by the new Soviet-installed János Kádár government and, of those, 13,000 were imprisoned. Imre Nagy was executed, along with Pál Maléter and Miklós Gimes, after secret trials in June 1958. By January 1957, the Hungarian government had suppressed all public opposition. These Hungarian government's violent oppressive actions alienated multiple Western Marxists, yet strengthened communist control in all the European communist states, cultivating the perception that communism was both irreversible and monolithic.

=== 1960 U-2 incident ===
The United States sent pilot Francis Gary Powers in a U-2 spy plane on a mission over Russian airspace to accumulate intelligence on the Soviet Union on 1 May 1960. The spy plan had taken off from Peshawar, Pakistan. Eisenhower administration authorized multiple such flights into Russian airspace, however, this one increased the tension on American-Soviet relations. On this day, Powers' plane was shot down and recovered by the Soviet Union. President Eisenhower and the United States tried to claim the plane was only used for weather purposes. The incident occurred just weeks before the two countries were supposed to attend a summit along with France and Great Britain. Soviet leader Nikita Khrushchev would not release any information about the plane or its pilot in the days leading up to the summit so that the United States would continue its "weather plane" lie, though eventually Eisenhower would be forced to admit that the CIA had been conducting such surveillance missions for years. This was because, at the summit, Khrushchev admitted that the Soviets had captured the pilot alive and recovered undamaged sections of the spy plane. He demanded that President Eisenhower apologize at the summit. Eisenhower did agree to bring the intelligence gathering excursions to an end but would not apologize for the incident. Upon Eisenhower's refusal to apologize, the summit came to an end as Khrushchev would no longer contribute to the discussion. One of Eisenhower's primary goals as president was to improve the American-Soviet relationship, however, this exchange proved to damage such relations. The summit was also an opportunity for the two leaders to finalize a limited nuclear test ban treaty, but this was no longer a possibility after the United States handling of the incident. Khrushchev threatened to drop a nuclear bomb on Peshawar, thus warning Pakistan that it had become a target of Soviet nuclear forces.

=== Berlin Crisis of 1961 ===
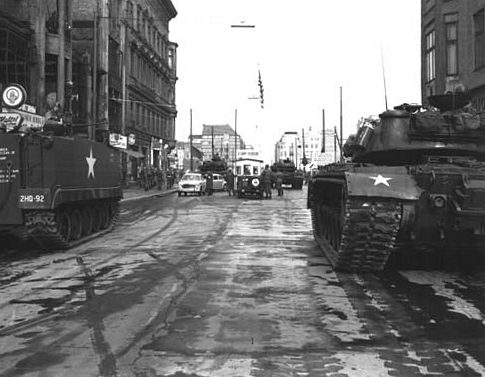
Soviet tanks face U.S. tanks at Checkpoint Charlie, October 27, 1961

The crucial sticking point was still Germany after the Allies merged their occupation zones to form the Federal Republic of Germany in 1949. In response Soviets declared their section, the German Democratic Republic, an independent nation. Neither side acknowledged the division, however, and on the surface both maintained a commitment to a united Germany under their respective governments.

Germany was an important issue because it was regarded as the power center of the continent, and both sides believed that it could be crucial to the world balance of power. While both might have preferred a united neutral Germany, the risks of it falling into the enemy's camp for either side were too high, and thus the temporary post-war occupation zones became permanent borders.

In November 1958, Soviet first secretary Khrushchev issued an ultimatum giving the Western powers six months to agree to withdraw from Berlin and make it a free, demilitarized city. At the end of that period, Khrushchev declared, the Soviet Union would turn over to East Germany complete control of all lines of communication with West Berlin; the western powers then would have access to West Berlin only by permission of the East German government. The United States, Britain, and France replied to this ultimatum by firmly asserting their determination to remain in West Berlin and to maintain their legal right of free access to that city.

In 1959, the Soviet Union withdrew its deadline and instead met with the Western powers in a Big Four foreign ministers' conference. Although the three-month-long sessions failed to reach any important agreements, they did open the door to further negotiations and led to Soviet leader Khrushchev's visit to the United States in September 1959. At the end of this visit, Khrushchev and President Eisenhower stated jointly that the most important issue in the world was general disarmament and that the problem of Berlin and "all outstanding international questions should be settled, not by the application of force, but by peaceful means through negotiations."

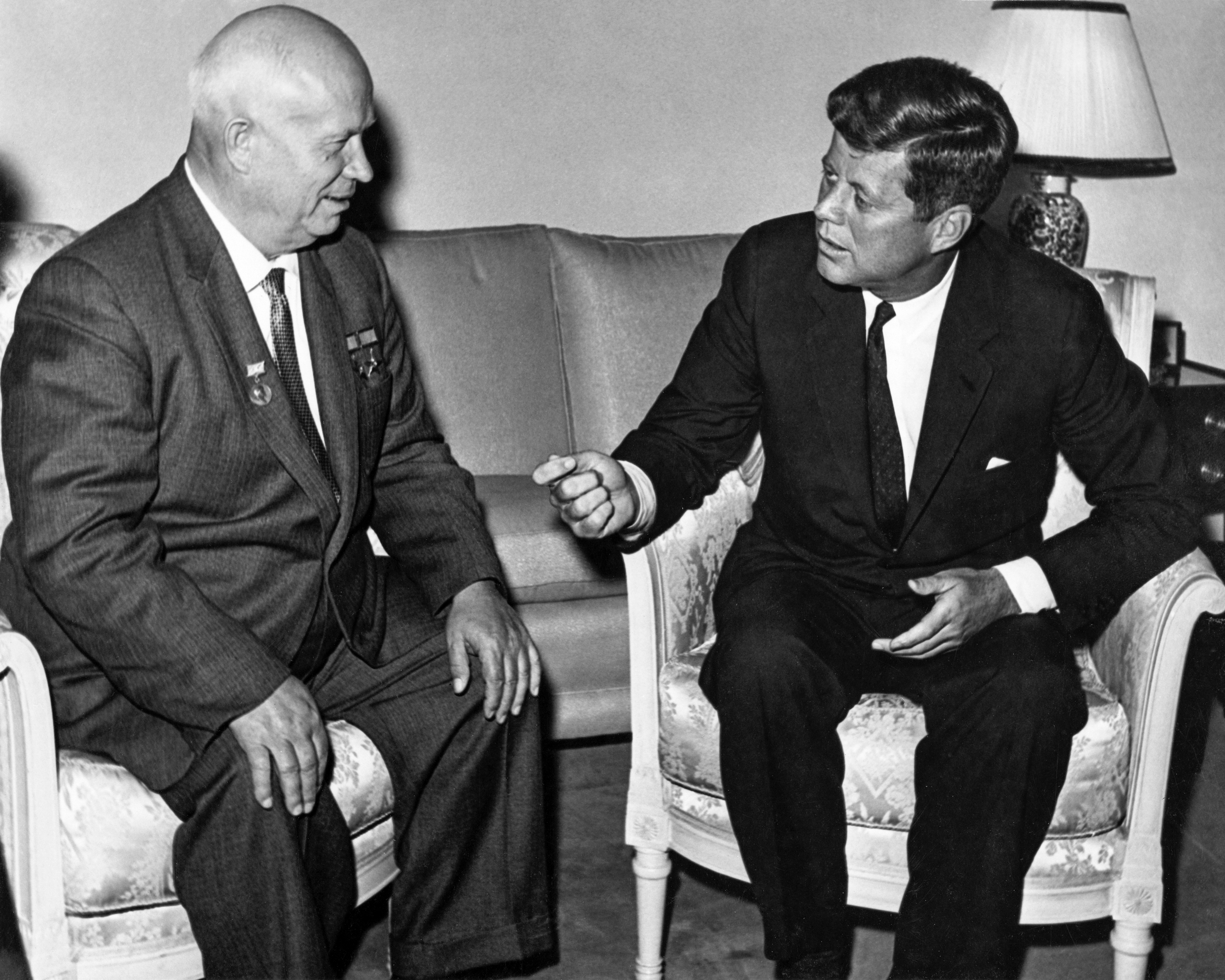
John F. Kennedy and Nikita Khrushchev meet in Vienna, June 3, 1961.

However, in June 1961 Soviet first secretary Khrushchev created a new crisis over the status of West Berlin when he again threatened to sign a separate peace treaty with East Germany, which he said, would end existing four-power agreements guaranteeing American, British, and French access rights to West Berlin. The three powers replied that no unilateral treaty could abrogate their responsibilities and rights in West Berlin, including the right of unobstructed access to the city.

As the confrontation over Berlin escalated, on 25 July President Kennedy requested an increase in the Army's total authorized strength from 875,000 to approximately 1 million men, along with an increase of 29,000 and 63,000 men in the active duty strength of the Navy and the Air Force. Additionally, he ordered that draft calls be doubled, and asked Congress for authority to order to active duty certain ready reserve units and individual reservists. He also requested new funds to identify and mark space in existing structures that could be used for fall-out shelters in case of attack, to stock those shelters with food, water, first-aid kits and other minimum essentials for survival, and to improve air-raid warning and fallout detection systems.

During the early months of 1961, the government actively sought a means of halting the emigration of its population to the West. By the early summer of 1961, East German President Walter Ulbricht apparently had persuaded the Soviets that an immediate solution was necessary and that the only way to stop the exodus was to use force. This presented a delicate problem for the Soviet Union because the four-power status of Berlin specified free travel between zones and specifically forbade the presence of German troops in Berlin.

During the spring and early summer, the East German regime procured and stockpiled building materials for the erection of the Berlin Wall. Although this extensive activity was widely known, few outside the small circle of Soviet and East German planners believed that East Germany would be sealed off.

On June 15, 1961, two months before the construction of the Berlin Wall started, First Secretary of the Socialist Unity Party and Staatsrat chairman Walter Ulbricht stated in an international press conference, "Niemand hat die Absicht, eine Mauer zu errichten!" (No one has the intention to erect a wall). It was the first time the colloquial term Mauer (wall) had been used in this context.

On Saturday, August 12, 1961, the leaders of East Germany attended a garden party at a government guesthouse in Döllnsee, in a wooded area to the north of East Berlin, and Walter Ulbricht signed the order to close the border and erect a Wall.

At midnight the army, police, and units of the East German army began to close the border and by morning on Sunday, August 13, 1961, the border to West Berlin had been shut. East German troops and workers had begun to tear up streets running alongside the barrier to make them impassable to most vehicles, and to install barbed wire entanglements and fences along the 156 km (97 mi) around the three western sectors and the 43 km (27 mi) which actually divided West and East Berlin. Approximately 32,000 combat and engineer troops were used in building the Wall. Once their efforts were completed, the Border Police assumed the functions of manning and improving the barrier. East German tanks and artillery were present to discourage interference by the West and presumably to assist in the event of large-scale riots.

On 30 August 1961, President John F. Kennedy ordered 148,000 Guardsmen and Reservists to active duty in response to East German moves to cut off allied access to Berlin. The Air Guard's share of that mobilization was 21,067 individuals. ANG units mobilized in October included 18 tactical fighter squadrons, 4 tactical reconnaissance squadrons, 6 air transport squadrons, and a tactical control group. On 1 November; the Air Force mobilized three more ANG fighter interceptor squadrons. In late October and early November, eight of the tactical fighter units flew to Europe with their 216 aircraft in operation "Stair Step", the largest jet deployment in the Air Guard's history. Because of their short range, 60 Air Guard F-104 interceptors were airlifted to Europe in late November. The United States Air Forces in Europe (USAFE) lacked spare parts needed for the ANG's aging F-84s and F-86s. Some units had been trained to deliver tactical nuclear weapons, not conventional bombs and bullets. They had to be retrained for conventional missions once they arrived on the continent. The majority of mobilized Air Guardsmen remained in the U.S.

The four powers governing Berlin (France, the Soviet Union, the United Kingdom, and the United States) had agreed at the 1945 Potsdam Conference that Allied personnel would not be stopped by East German police in any sector of Berlin. But on 22 October 1961, just two months after the construction of the Wall, the U.S. Chief of Mission in West Berlin, E. Allan Lightner, was stopped in his car (which had occupation forces license plates) while going to a theater in East Berlin. Army General Lucius D. Clay (retired), U.S. President John F. Kennedy's Special Advisor in West Berlin, decided to demonstrate American resolve.

The attempts of a U.S. diplomat to enter East Berlin were backed by U.S. troops. This led to the stand-off between US and Soviet tanks at Checkpoint Charlie on 27–28 October 1961. The stand-off was resolved only after direct talks between Ulbricht and Kennedy.

The Berlin Crisis saw US Army troops facing East German Army troops in a stand-off, until the East German government backed down. The crisis ended in the summer of 1962 and the personnel returned to the United States.

During the crisis KGB prepared an elaborate subversion and disinformation plan "to create a situation in various areas of the world which would favor dispersion of attention and forces by the U.S. and their satellites, and would tie them down during the settlement of the question of a German peace treaty and West Berlin". On 1 August 1961 this plan was approved by CPSU Central Committee.

== Third World arena of conflict ==
The Korean War marked a shift in the focal point of the Cold War, from postwar Europe to East Asia. After this point, in the wake of the disintegration of Europe's colonial empires, proxy battles in the Third World became an important arena of superpower competition in the establishment of alliances and jockeying for influence in these emerging nations. Multiple Third World nations, however, did not want to align themselves with either of the superpowers. The Non-Aligned Movement, led by India, Egypt, and Yugoslavia, attempted to unite the third world against what was seen as imperialism by both the East and the West.

=== Defense pacts ===
The Eisenhower administration attempted to formalize its alliance system through a series of pacts. Its Southeast Asian allies were joined into the Southeast Asia Treaty Organization (SEATO) while allies in Latin America were placed in the Inter-American Treaty of Reciprocal Assistance (TIAR). The ANZUS alliance was signed between the Australia, New Zealand, and the U.S. None of these groupings was as successful as NATO had been in Europe.

John Foster Dulles, a rigid anti-communist, focused aggressively on Third World politics. He intensified efforts to "integrate" the entire non-communist Third World into a system of mutual defense pacts, traveling almost 500,000 miles in order to cement new alliances. Dulles initiated the Manila Conference in 1954, which resulted in the SEATO pact that united eight nations (either located in Southeast Asia or with interests there) in a neutral defense pact. This treaty was followed in 1955 by the Middle East Treaty Organization (METO), uniting the United Kingdom, Turkey, Iraq, Iran, and Pakistan in a defense organization. A Northeast Asia Treaty Organization (NEATO) comprising the U.S., Japan, South Korea, and Taiwan was also considered.

=== Decolonization ===
The combined effects of two great European wars had weakened the political and economic domination of Africa, Asia, Oceania, Latin America, and the Middle East by European powers. This led to a series of waves of African and Asian decolonization following World War II; a world that had been dominated for over a century by Western imperialist colonial powers was transformed into a world of emerging African, Middle Eastern, and Asian nations. The sheer number of nation states increased drastically.

The Cold War started placing immense pressure on developing nations to align with one of the superpower factions. Both promised substantial financial, military, and diplomatic aid in exchange for an alliance, in which issues like corruption and human rights abuses were overlooked or ignored. When an allied government was threatened, the superpowers were often prepared and willing to intervene.

In such an international setting, the Soviet Union propagated a role as the leader of the "anti-imperialist" camp, currying favor in the Third World as being a more staunch opponent of colonialism than multiple independent nations in Africa and Asia. Khrushchev broadened Moscow's policy by establishing new relations with India and other key non-aligned, non-communist states throughout the Third World. Multiple countries in the emerging Non-Aligned Movement developed a close relationship with Moscow.

Meanwhile, the Eisenhower administration adjusted U.S. policy to the effects of decolonization. This shifted the focus of 1947–1949 away from war-torn Europe. By the early 1950s, the NATO alliance had already integrated Western Europe into the system of mutual defense pacts, providing safeguards against subversion or neutrality in the bloc. The Marshall Plan had already rebuilt a functioning Western economic system, thwarting the electoral appeal of the radical left. When economic aid had ended the dollar shortage and stimulated private investment for postwar reconstruction, in turn sparing the U.S. from a crisis of over-production and maintaining demand for U.S. exports, the Eisenhower administration began to focus on other regions.

In an exercise of the new "rollback" policies, acting on the doctrines of Dulles, Eisenhower thwarted Soviet intervention, using the CIA to overthrow unfriendly governments. In the Arab world, the focus was pan-Arab nationalism. U.S. companies had already invested heavily in the region, which contained the world's largest oil reserves. The U.S. was concerned about the stability and friendliness of governments in the region, upon which the health of the U.S. economy increasingly grew to depend.

== Africa ==
Africa would be a major battleground during the Cold War. The U.S. viewed the decolonization movement in Africa as an opportunity to gain access to raw materials that had previously been monopolized by the imperialist powers in Europe. U.S. policymakers also recognized that the poverty and instability that had persisted in Africa because of the colonial empires would provide a breeding ground for communist ideologies, so the U.S. would respond by providing economic assistance to the newly developing nations in Africa. Though the United States championed itself as a beacon of freedom and democracy, it often supported repressive regimes within Africa, such as the apartheid system led by a minority white population in South Africa.

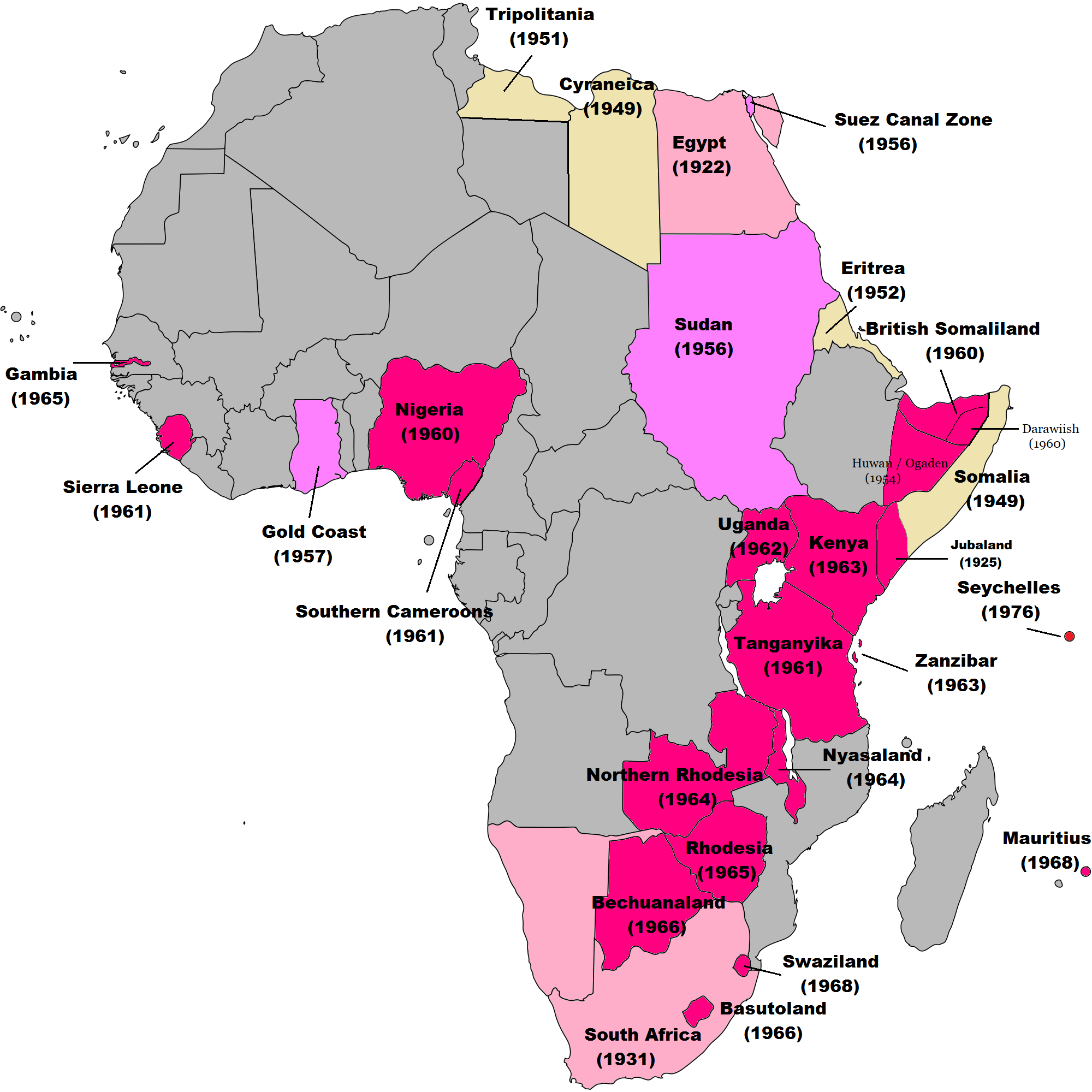
British decolonization in Africa

Communist governments also had, sometimes conflicting, policy objectives within Africa. The Soviet Union sought to respond to United States intervention within Africa by establishing alliances with newly born nations against Western imperialism. The Soviet Union saw the elimination of colonial capitalism from Africa, and the rest of the Third World, as necessary for the advancement of those nations and by extension the triumph of socialism over capitalism. Third World nationalists viewed the command-style economy of the Soviet Union as promising since it allowed that country to advance from an agrarian to an industrial economy. However, Soviet doctrine was not only challenged by the United States influence but by other communist powers: China also moved to support nationalist movements in Africa. Though the Soviet Union provided more substantial assistance, Maoist ideology became more alluring than Soviet ideology due to its emphasis on the rural population as opposed to Soviet doctrine which focused more on the urban proletariat. As such, Maoist ideology became popular within the Zimbabwe African National Union (ZANU) and the Front for the Liberation of Mozambique (FRELIMO). Often the Soviet Union and China found themselves supporting opposing liberation movements in Africa. Such as with Zimbabwe, with the Soviet Union supporting the Zimbabwe African Peoples Union (ZAPU) while China supported the ZANU's breakaway movements.

Cuba would also play a major role in the nationalist movements within Africa. Cuba's focus on Africa stemmed from the belief that it provided an arena for the struggle between socialism and capitalism. Another reason cited by the Cuban government for its support of African socialist movements was the shared link between Cuba and Africa due to the fact that one-third of Cubans were of significant African heritage. As such, Fidel Castro and other Cuban revolutionaries wanted to spread the ideas of the Cuban Revolution to African independence movements and government's in newly independent African states. Cuba would provide significant support to socialists during the Cold War, such as to the MPLA in Angola, FRELIMO in Mozambique, and to dictators, including Sekou Touré of Guinea, and Mengistu Haile Mariam of Ethiopia.

=== Congo Crisis ===
The Democratic Republic of the Congo (DRC), previously known as Belgian Congo, achieved independence from Belgium in 1960, after which Western leaders were determined to keep the country, and its enormous quantities of mineral wealth, within the West's sphere of influence. However, in May 1960, the elected government. led by Patrice Lumumba, envisioned an economic model that would benefit the citizens of the Congo as opposed to supporting western economic interests. As such western powers sought to replace Lumumba with a more pro-western leader.

On July 5, five days after independence, Congolese soldiers mutinied after being told by their Belgian officers that there would be no wage increases, promotions, or African officers in the post-colonial army. After which Lumumba dismissed the Belgians, and elevated Joseph Mobutu to army chief of staff. Later on July 11, Moïse Tshombe, who was closely associated with Belgian settlers and international mining interests seceded the mineral-rich Katanga province from the DRC Convinced that Belgium was attempting to recolonize the Congo, Lumumba appealed for intervention at the United Nations. However the U.N. and U.S. refused to provide support, and thus Lumumba turned to the Soviet Union for aid. The United States government saw this as a threat and thus formulated plans to assassinate Lumumba.

On September 5, President Joseph Kasa-Vubu ordered the dismissal of Lumumba and his cabinet over massacres by the armed forces during the invasion of South Kasai and for allowing Soviets military advisers into the country. Later on September 14, with CIA and Belgian army support, Mobutu staged a coup against Lumumba. Lumumba was captured and transferred to Katanga in January where he was executed by the secessionist forces there. Tshombe then replaced Lumumba as prime minister In July 1964. Despite Tshombe's rule, the Congo would continue to be in crisis throughout the rest of the 20th and early 21st centuries. Though Communist nations would support rebel groups in the Congo, those groups would not succeed in taking power. The Congolese crisis had the effect of alienating from both the West and the East some in the third world who saw the East as weak and impotent, and the West as unethical and unscrupulous.

=== East Africa ===
The Mau Mau uprising who fought against the British colonists and white settlers in Kenya, which was dominated by the Kikuyu which spreads the entire region of British Kenya. Jomo Kenyatta was arrested in 1954 and was released later in 1961. In 1957, Dedan Kimathi, the leader of Mau Mau who calls for Kenya's independence from British rule was hanged in the capital Nairobi which has laid down by the King's African Rifles (KAR) when the British lieutenant Idi Amin who would later become the dictator of Uganda, has served in the British Army in 1946 which has led Uganda's independence from the United Kingdom on 9 October 1962 with Milton Obote as Prime Minister.

=== Suez Crisis ===
The Middle East in the Cold War was an area of extreme importance and also great instability. The region lay directly south of the Soviet Union, which traditionally had great influence in Turkey and Iran. The area also had vast reserves of oil, not crucial for either superpower in the 1950s (who each held large oil reserves on their own) but essential for the rapidly rebuilding American allies in Europe and Japan. The original American plan for the Middle East was to form a defensive perimeter along the north of the region. Thus, Turkey, Iraq, Iran, and Pakistan signed the Baghdad Pact and joined METO.

The Eastern response was to seek influence in states such as Syria and Egypt. In accordance with this, Czechoslovakia and Bulgaria made arms deals with Egypt, worth up to $225– 50 million in exchange for surplus cotton, giving Warsaw Pact members a strong presence in the region. Egypt, a former British protectorate, was one of the region's most important prizes with a large population and political power throughout the region.

General Gamal Abdel Nasser's dealings with the Soviet Union and its allies antagonized the administrations of the West, including the Eisenhower administration in the U.S. In July 1956, the Eisenhower administration balked at funding the massive Aswan Dam project. In response, that same year, Nasser nationalized the Suez Canal and ejected British troops from Egypt.

Eisenhower persuaded the United Kingdom and France to retreat from a badly planned invasion with Israel that was launched to regain control of the canal from Egypt for fear of alienating other Arab states, and driving them into the arms of the Soviet Union. While the Americans were forced to operate covertly, so as not to embarrass their allies, the Eastern Bloc nations made loud threats against the "imperialists" and worked to portray themselves as the defenders of the Third World. Nasser was later lauded around the globe, but especially in the Arab world.

Thus, the Suez stalemate was a turning point heralding an ever-growing rift between the Atlantic Cold War allies, which were becoming far less of a united monolith than they were in the immediate aftermath of the Second World War. Italy, France, Spain, West Germany, Norway, Canada, and Britain developed a common market to be less dependent on the United States. Such rifts mirror changes in global economics. American economic competitiveness faltered in the face of the challenges of Japan and West Germany, which recovered rapidly from the wartime decimation of their respective industrial bases. The 20th-century successor to the UK as the "workshop of the world", the United States found its competitive edge dulled in the international markets while at the same time it faced intensified foreign competition at home. Meanwhile, the Warsaw Pact countries were closely allied both militarily and economically.

== Latin America ==
The Eisenhower-Dulles approach sought to overthrow unfriendly governments, but did so in a covert way. Throughout much of Latin America, reactionary oligarchies ruled through their alliances with the military elite and the United States. Although the nature of the U.S. role in the region was established a number of years before the Cold War, the Cold War gave U.S. interventionism a new ideological tinge. But by the mid-20th century, much of the region passed through a higher state of economic development, which bolstered the power and ranks of the lower classes. This left calls for social change and political inclusion more pronounced, thus posing a challenge to the strong U.S. influence over the region's economies. By the 1960s, Marxists gained increasing influence throughout the regions, prompting fears in the United States that Latin American instability posed a threat to U.S. national security.

Future Latin American revolutionaries shifted to guerrilla tactics, particularly following the Cuban Revolution. Arbenz fell when his military had deserted him. Since then, some future Latin American social revolutionaries and Marxists, most notably Fidel Castro and the Sandinistas in Nicaragua made the army and governments parts of a single unit and eventually set up single party states. Overthrowing such regimes would require a war, rather than a simple CIA operation, the landing of U.S. Marines, or a crude invasion scheme like the Bay of Pigs Invasion.

=== Haiti ===
After several coups d'état of Dumarsais Estimé and Paul Magloire which has led to the campaign of 1957 Haitian general election with the Haitian voodoo dictator Dr. François Duvalier (Papa Doc) wins a landslide victory with the highest black majority population on 22 September 1957, with the defeat of Louis Déjoie against the mulatto Haitians throughout the country. On 22 October, Duvalier was inaugurated and sworn in as the 34th President of Haiti. In 1958, after taking power as Haiti's new leader, the July 1958 Haitian coup attempt led by Alix Pasquet who attempted to overthrow the dictator but failed as he was killed by a grenade at the barracks next to the palace. Once he established the Duvalier government, he created a new militia and the secret police that used from the Haitian Mythology as the Tonton Macoutes (known as the Volunteers for National Security, French: Volontaires de la Sécurité Nationale) to secure the regime and making sure he is not overthrown like his predecessors, he continued to the use of ideology as Noirisme, with political and cultural movement at the end of the United States occupation of Haiti.

=== Guatemala ===
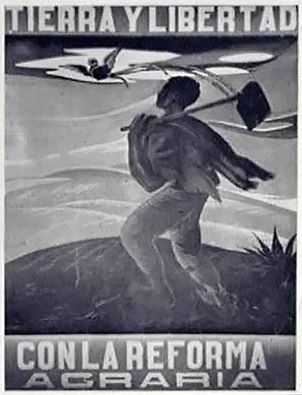
When democratically elected Guatemalan President Jacobo Árbenz attempted a modest redistribution of land, he was overthrown in the 1954 CIA Guatemalan coup d'état

Throughout the Cold War years, the U.S. acted as a barrier to socialist revolutions and targeted populist and nationalist governments that were aided by the communists. The CIA overthrew other governments suspected of turning pro-communist, such as Guatemala in 1954 under Jacobo Arbenz Guzman. The CIA Operation PBSuccess eventually led to the 1954 coup that removed Arbnez from power. The operation drew on an initial plan first considered in 1951 to oust Arbenz named Operation PBFortune. Arbenz, who was supported by some local communists, was ousted shortly after he had redistributed 178,000 acres (720 km^{2}) of United Fruit Company land in Guatemala. United Fruit had long monopolized the transportation and communications region there, along with the main export commodities, and played a major role in Guatemalan politics. Arbenz was out shortly afterwards, and Guatemala came under control of a repressive military regime.

=== Cuba ===
==== Consolidation of the Cuban Revolution ====
The Castro Regime overthrew the dictatorship of Fulgencio Batista, who came to power in 1933 through a military revolution, and then again through another military coup. Batista's first revolt was called the "Revolt of the Sergeants". After the revolt Batista ran the government through a number of puppet rulers. However, after a series of failed puppet presidents Batista himself became president from 1940 to 1944. Batista's first term as president went peacefully and saw large amounts of economic growth due to public works programs he implemented. After his term as president Batista moved to Florida where he lived until he decided to come back to Cuba and run for president in 1952. But, just three months before election day, a military coup put Batista back in power. He justified this coup by claiming the sitting president was planning his own coup in order to remain in power. The Batista dictatorship lasted seven years until 1959 when it was overthrown by Fidel Castro.

Fidel Castro was the first political leader to establish a communist state in the western hemisphere and held control of Cuba for over five decades. Castro's political career started when he entered law school at the University of Havana. He then joined the Orthodox Party movement, but tried and failed to overthrow the dictator of the Dominican Republic Trujillo in 1947. In 1952 he ran for a seat in Cuba's House of Representatives, but the election failed to happen due to the rise of the dictator. In 1953 Castro launched a coup in an attempt to overthrow Batista, but failed and was jailed soon after. While in jail he renamed his revolutionary group "26th of July Movement" and helped coordinate the group from prison. In 1955 was released from Cuban prison under an amnesty deal, after which fled to Mexico in order to rally support for his second attempt at overthrowing Batista and dictatorship. In December 1956, Castro, along with about 80 of his comrades, landed on Cuba. Though most of his forces were killed or captured for their attempt to overthrow the government during this time, Castro and what was left of his forces escaped into the mountains and began their guerrilla warfare campaign. Over the next two years Castro continued his guerrilla warfare while slowly growing his militant forces. In 1959 Castro's forces had key victories at important Cuban strongholds that, combined with Barista's loss of popularity and military power, led to Barista fleeing Cuba and Castro taking power.

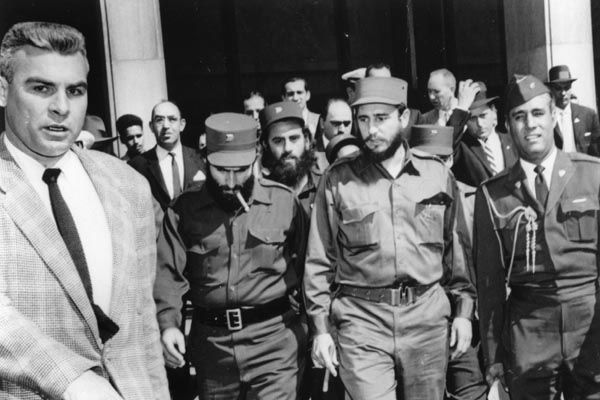
Fidel Castro during a visit to Washington, D.C., shortly after the Cuban Revolution in 1959

Castro was sworn in as Prime Minister of Cuba on February 16, 1959, at this point in time he had control of the Cuban government's 30,000 man army. One of Castro's first acts as leader of Cuba was to nationalize American assets on the island without compensation. Before the fall of the pro-U.S. Batista regime, U.S. interests had owned four-fifths of the stakes in the island's utilities, nearly half of its sugar, and nearly all of its mining industries. The U.S. could manipulate the Cuban economy at a whim by tinkering with the island's financial services or by tampering with government quotas and tariffs on sugar–the country's staple export commodity. In response to these acts, the U.S. government refused to recognize Castro as the leader of Cuba, the U.S. government made the first of several attempts of overthrow Castro by launching the infamous Bay of Pigs Invasion.

Castro then signed a trade agreement in February 1960 with communist states, which would emerge as a market for the island's agricultural commodities (and a new source for machinery, heavy industrial equipment, and technicians) that could replace the country's traditional patron–the United States. The East garnered a huge victory when they formed an alliance with Cuba after Fidel Castro's successful revolution in 1959. This was a major victory for the Soviet Union, which had garnered an ally in close proximity to the American coast. Overthrowing the new regime became a focus for the CIA.

==== Plans against Castro ====
After Fidel Castro's takeover of Cuba, the United States was unsure about the nation's new leader's political ideologies. Potential economic cooperation between Nikita Khrushchev and Fidel Castro in 1959, leaders of the Soviet Union and Cuba, respectively, resulted in the immediate perturbation of the United States. The largest concern at this time was a Soviet satellite just 90 miles from the United States' mainland. The administration then began planning to intervene in this situation. The CIA initially proposed sabotaging the sugar refineries in Cuba, but President Eisenhower felt the threat was Castro and that he was the issue the United States needed to resolve. The CIA then began planning for an overthrow or possible assassination of Castro in December 1959. In February 1960, President Eisenhower requested the CIA develop a formal program to remove Castro from power. The request resulted in a plan for a task force led by Deputy Director for Plans Richard Bissell. The initial stage of this task force was to develop and train a group of Cuban exiles to form a paramilitary group. This group would then deploy to Cuba to organize, train, and lead resistance forces to overthrow the government. With no other plausible alternative, Eisenhower approved the Bissell task force which is also known as Brigade 2506. The force was later transitioned from its original guerrilla infiltration model to a more paramilitary invasion concept due to the difficulty in coordinating with anti-Castro opposition. In Eisenhower's remaining months in office, he pushed the CIA to accelerate its plans for Brigade 2506. Eisenhower did not want the transition of presidency to halt any development. The plans began to finalize in the time between Kennedy's election in November and his inauguration in January. Bissell hoped to train men in Guatemala to be Brigade 2506 and the 5412 Committee endorsed this along with the use of an airstrip in Nicaragua, and supply missions from the United States. President Kennedy was faced with the decision of whether or not to follow through with this plan when he ordered a meeting with multiple department heads in the United States government. Kennedy ultimately decided to fully fund and accelerate the program making the operation and its results his own responsibility.

==== Bay of Pigs Invasion and the Cuban Missile Crisis ====
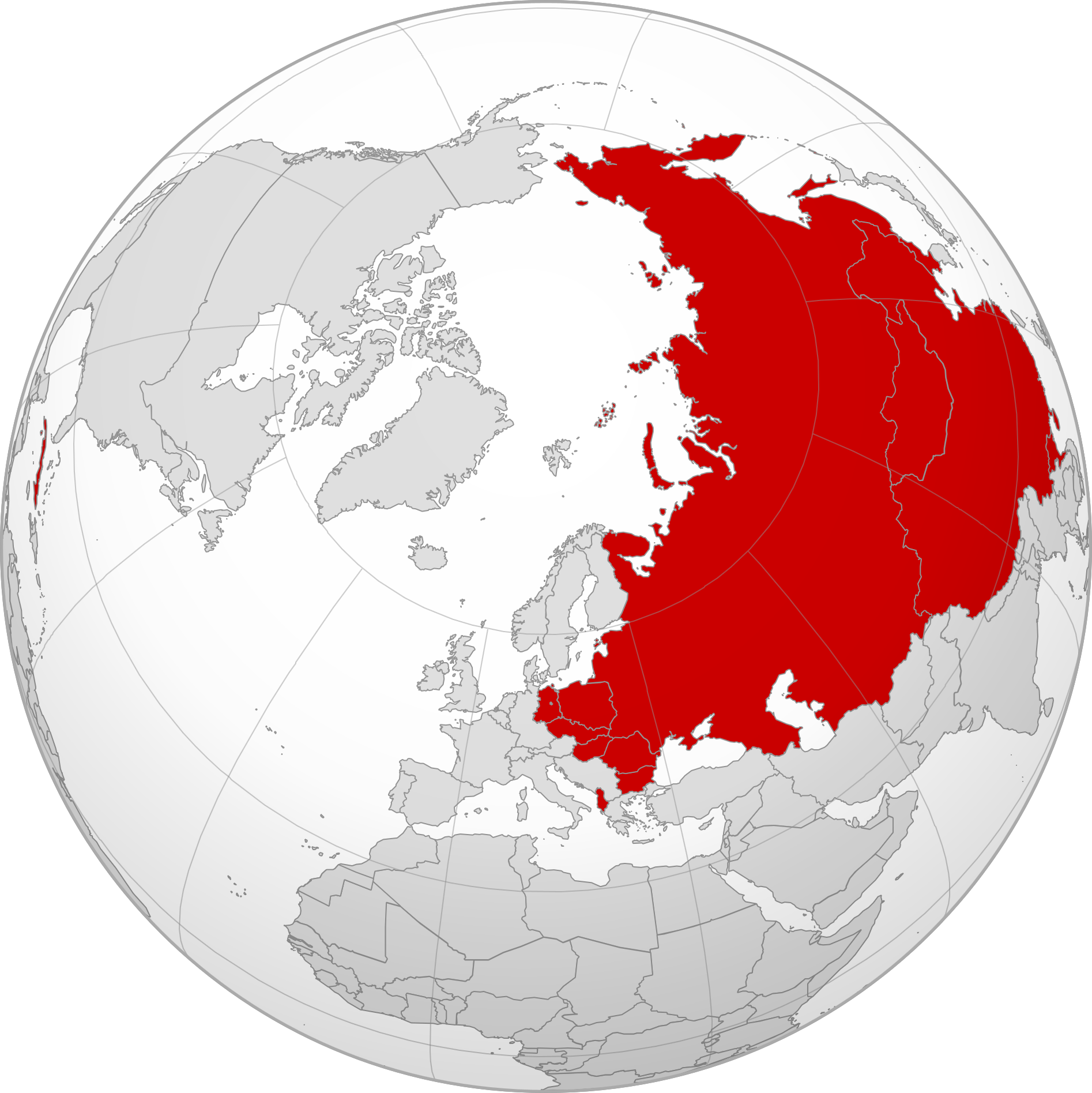
The maximum territorial extent of countries in the world under Soviet influence, after Cuba turned to socialism in 1959 and before the official Sino-Soviet split of 1961

Hoping to copy the success of Guatemala and Iran in 1961, the CIA, noting the large wave of emigration to the U.S. after Castro took power, trained and armed a group of Cuban exiles who landed at the Bay of Pigs where they were to attempt to spark an uprising against the Castro regime. The assault failed miserably, however. Afterwards, Castro publicly declared himself a Marxist-Leninst and set up Cuba as the first Communist state in the Americas and continued to nationalize virtually all major industries in the country.

The Soviet government seized on the abortive invasion as a rationale for the placing of Soviet troops in Cuba. It was also decided to position on Cuba medium-range nuclear missiles which could strike multiple points in the U.S. at once.

In response, President John F. Kennedy quarantined the island, and after several intense days the Soviets decided to retreat in return for promises from the U.S. not to invade Cuba and to pull missiles out of Turkey. After this brush with nuclear war, the two leaders banned nuclear tests in the air and underwater after 1962. The Soviets also began a huge military buildup. The retreat undermined Khrushchev, who was ousted soon afterwards and replaced by Leonid Brezhnev.

The Cuban Revolution led to Kennedy's initiation of the "Alliance for Progress" program. The program was to provide billions of dollars of loans and aid over the course of the 1960s for economic development in order to stave off socialist revolution. The Alliance also contained counterinsurgency measures, such as the establishment of the Jungle Warfare School in the Panama Canal Zone and the training of police forces.

== Asia ==
=== Mossadegh and the CIA in Iran ===
The United States reacted with alarm as it watched developments in Iran, which had been in a state of instability since 1951.

Through the Anglo-Iranian Oil Company (AIOC), the British had a monopoly on the transporting, pumping, and refining of oil in most of Iran. The company paid production royalties to the government of the Shah— placed on the throne by the British in 1941. But the royalties and salaries to Iranian employees were smaller, considering that the company's earnings were ten times greater than its expenses. Iran suffered from poverty, and nationalists insisted that controlling the company could alleviate this.

Many Iranians demanded that a higher share of the company's earnings be paid. In response, the AIOC replied that it had a binding agreement with the Shah until 1993, and collaborated with some Iranian political forces to draft a report opposing nationalization. In February 1951, the Iranian prime minister, suspected of being involved with the report, was assassinated. He was replaced by nationalist Mohammad Mosaddegh. Later that year the new prime minister nationalized his nation's British-owned oil wells.

As the Iranians moved toward seizing the reserves, the Truman administration attempted to mediate. Later, the Eisenhower administration, convinced that Iran was developing communist ties, used the CIA, joining forces with Iran's military leaders to overthrow Iran's government. Mossadegh drew on the Tudeh, the Communist Party of Iran, for much of his support. However, by 1953 the party had begun to criticize him as a U.S. puppet state. Since the Tudeh was the strongest Communist party in the Middle East, the Eisenhower administration cited a potential communist takeover in the Middle East to justify intervention. Mossadeq invoked the communist threat to gain American concessions. The premier perceived that as Iran's economy suffered and fears of communist takeover gripped the U.S. government, the U.S. would abandon Britain and rescue him from his predicament.

To replace Mossadegh, the U.S. favored the young Mohammad Reza Pahlavi. In return, Pahlavi promised to allow U.S. companies to share in the development of his nation's reserves. According to CIA documents made public in 2000, the U.S. provided guns, trucks, armored cars, and radio communications in the CIA-assisted 1953 coup, which elevated Pahlavi from his position as that of a constitutional monarch to that of an absolute ruler. With Mossadeq out of the way, oil profits were then divided between the Shah's regime and a new international consortium. The British were awarded 40% of the country's oil revenues, five U.S. firms (Gulf, SOCONY-Vacuum, Standard Oil of California, Standard Oil of New Jersey, and Texaco) won another 40%, and the rest went to Royal Dutch Shell and Compagnie Française des Pétroles. The profits were divided evenly between the consortium and Iran.

Since the turn of the 20th century the United States had been trying to get into the Iranian oil fields only to encounter British competition. The breakthrough for the U.S. was made possible by the Cold War-era ties to the Shah and under the guidance of the State Department official Herbert Hoover, Jr., who had gained a great deal of experience in the complexities of the international oil problem as a private businessman.

=== Indochina ===
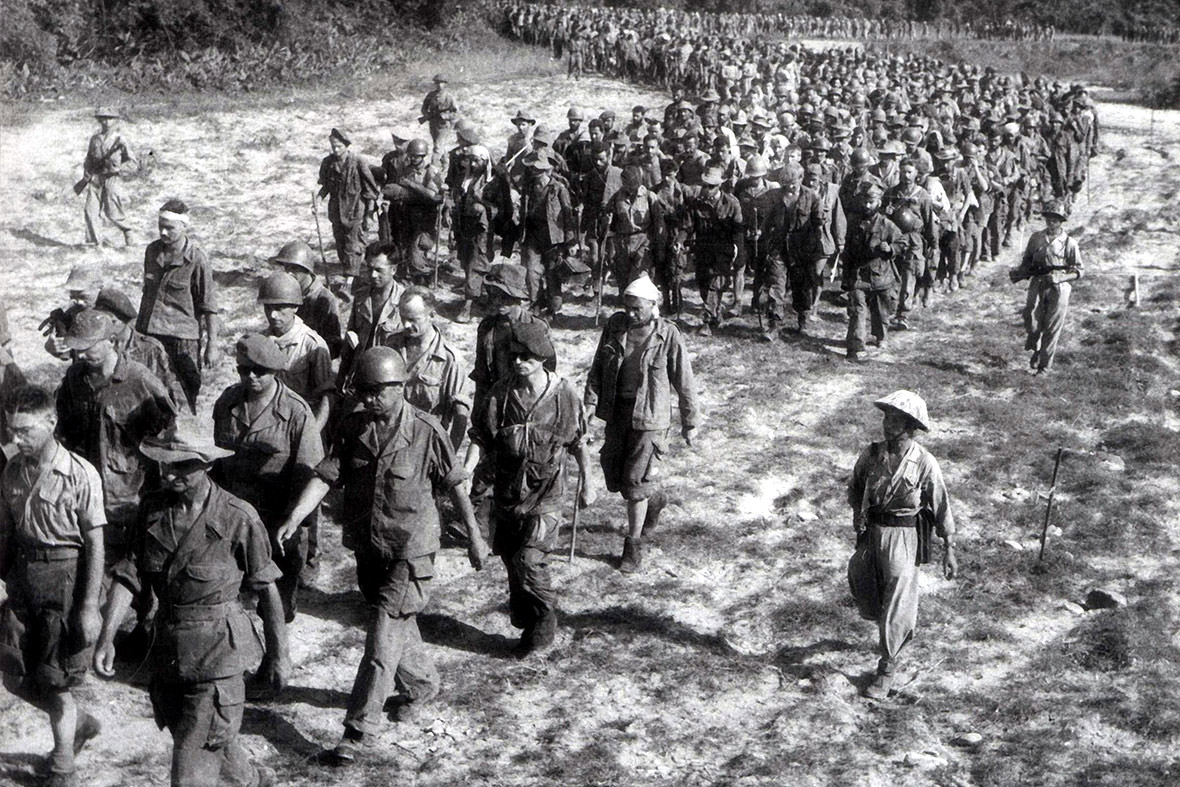
Captured French soldiers from Điện Biên Phủ, escorted by Vietnamese troops, walk to a prisoner-of-war camp

The Battle of Dien Bien Phu (French: Bataille de Diên Biên Phu; Vietnamese: Chiến dịch Điện Biên Phủ) was the climactic battle of the First Indochina War between French Union forces of the French Far East Expeditionary Corps, and Vietnamese Viet Minh communist revolutionary forces led by Ho Chi Minh. The battle occurred between March and May 1954, and culminated in a massive French defeat that effectively ended the war.

Cambodia and Laos both achieved independence from France which led to the founding of the Workers' Party of Kampuchea (later becoming Kampuchean People's Revolutionary Party) and Lao People's Revolutionary Party. As a result of blunders in the French decision-making process, the French undertook to create an air-supplied base at Dien Bien Phu, deep in the hills of Vietnam. Its purpose was to cut off Viet Minh supply lines into the neighboring French protectorate of Laos and Cambodia, at the same time drawing the Viet Minh into a battle that would cripple them. Instead, the Viet Minh, under General Võ Nguyên Giáp, surrounded and besieged the French, who were unaware of the Viet Minh's possession of heavy artillery (including anti-aircraft guns) and their ability to move such weapons to the mountain crests overlooking the French encampment. The Viet Minh occupied the highlands around Dien Bien Phu, and were able to fire down accurately onto French positions. Tenacious fighting on the ground ensued, reminiscent of the trench warfare of World War I. The French repeatedly repulsed Viet Minh assaults on their positions. Supplies and reinforcements were delivered by air, although as the French positions were overrun and the anti-aircraft fire took its toll, fewer and fewer of those supplies reached them. After a two-month siege, the garrison was overrun and most French surrendered. Despite the loss of most of their best soldiers, the Viet Minh marshaled their remaining forces and pursued those French who did flee into the wilderness, routing them and ending the battle.

Shortly after the battle, the war ended with the 1954 Geneva accords, under which France agreed to withdraw from its former Indochinese colonies including Cambodia led by Pol Pot (Saloth Sar) and Laos by Souphanouvong. The accords partitioned the country in two; fighting later resumed, in 1959, among rival Vietnamese forces as the Vietnam War (Second Indochina War).

The U.S. intervention with the greatest ramifications was in Indochina. Between 1954 and 1961, the administration dispatched economic aid and 695 military advisers to the Republic of Vietnam (RVN), which was battling the National Liberation Front (NLF) guerrillas. The NLF drew its ranks from the southern peasantry and was backed by North Vietnam, which in turn was backed by the Soviet Union and China. The RVN was later absorbed by its communist counterpart to form the Socialist Republic of Vietnam. Today, Vietnam is one of the world's four remaining communist states (along with China, Cuba, and Laos).

=== Indonesia ===
In Indonesia in February 1958 rebels on Sumatra and Sulawesi declared the PRRI-Permesta Movement aimed at overthrowing the government of Sukarno. Due to their anti-communist rhetoric, the rebels received money, weapons, and manpower from the CIA. This support ended when Allen Lawrence Pope, an American pilot, was shot down after a bombing raid on government-held Ambon in April 1958. In April 1958, the central government responded by launching airborne and seaborne military invasions on Padang and Manado, the rebel capitals. By the end of 1958, the rebels had been militarily defeated, and the last remaining rebel guerrilla bands surrendered in August 1961.

=== South Asia ===
There were some strategic reasons to be involved in South Asia. The Americans hoped that the Pakistani armed forces could be used to block any Soviet thrust into the crucial Middle East. It was also felt that as a large and high-profile nation, India would be a notable prize if it fell into either camp. India, a fledgling democracy, was never particularly in any grave danger of falling to insurgents or external pressure from a great power. It also did not wish to ally with the United States.

A key event in the South Asian arena of Cold War competition was the signing of the Mutual Defense Assistance Agreement between Pakistan and the United States in 1954. This pact would limit the later options of all the major powers in the region. The U.S. committed to remaining closely tied to Pakistan. For Pakistan, the U.S. alliance became a central tenet of its foreign policy, and despite numerous disappointments with it, it was always seen as far too valuable a connection to abandon. After the Sino-Soviet Split, Pakistan also pursued close relations with China.

Soviet policy towards South Asia had closely paralleled that of the United States. At first the Soviets, like the Americans, had been largely uninterested in the region and maintained a neutral position in the Indo-Pakistani disputes. With the signing of the accords between Pakistan and the United States in 1954, along with the countries enlisting in METO and SEATO, the situation changed. In 1955, Khrushchev and Bulganin toured India and promised large quantities of financial aid and assistance in building industrial infrastructure. In Srinagar, the capital of Kashmir, the Soviet leaders announced that the Soviet Union would abandon its neutralist position and back India in the ongoing Kashmir dispute.

Indian prime minister Jawaharlal Nehru was skeptical, however, and for many of the same reasons that he had wished to avoid entanglements with the United States he also wished to keep India from being too closely attached to the Soviet Union. Although the USSR sent India some aid, and although Nehru became the first non-communist leader to address the people of the Soviet Union, the two nations remained relatively distant. After Khrushchev's ousting, the Soviets reverted to a neutralist position and moderated the aftermath of the 1965 war. Peace negotiations were held in the Central Asian city of Tashkent.

By the late 1960s, Indian development efforts had again stalled. A large current accounts deficit had developed and a severe drought hit the agricultural sector hard. As with the downturn of a decade earlier, India again looked to outside assistance. However, relations were at a low ebb with the United States, which was largely preoccupied with Vietnam. On top of that, several smaller issues had turned American indifference into antipathy. Western international organizations such as the World Bank were also unwilling to commit money to India's development projects without Indian trade concessions.

Along with other Warsaw Pact nations, the Soviets began to provide extensive support for India's efforts to create an industrial base. In 1969, the two powers negotiated a treaty of friendship that would make non-alignment little more than a pretext. Two years later, when faced with a growing crisis in East Pakistan (now Bangladesh), India signed the agreement.

=== Sino-Soviet split ===
Before the Sino-Soviet split, tensions between China and India complicated the Soviet Union's efforts to maintain close relations with both of Asia's leading emerging nations. In March 1959, China suppressed a revolt in Tibet, leading to open conflict between China and India. On March 31, the Dalai Lama, Tibet's spiritual and temporal ruler, fled to India, where he was granted asylum over China's protest. India later backed a move in the United Nations general assembly to enter into a full debate on charges of Chinese suppression of human rights in Tibet over the objections of the Soviet Union, Poland, Yugoslavia, Albania, Romania, Bulgaria, East Germany, Hungary, Czechoslovakia, North Korea, and Mongolia. However, despite the Warsaw Pact's, Mongolia's, and North Korea's objections to the Indian-backed debate in the UN, Mao grew increasingly frustrated with the Soviet Union's rather muted and reluctant backing of Chinese actions in Tibet. Director of Central Intelligence at the time Allen W. Dulles believed that India and Pakistan could best combat communist China politically and economically, but noted that the ruthless suppression of the Tibetan Revolt was likely to cause each country to focus resources on protecting their Himalayan borders militarily. This would likely escalate the contest, and not in favor of India.

China's active presence in Tibet preceded a much more dangerous confrontation between India and China. Successive Chinese governments had rejected the Sino-Indian border dictated by the British Empire in the early 20th century, called the McMahon Line. As China built outposts along what China thought to be its borders, India built more outposts in the disputed area to drive out the Chinese, in what would be known as the Forward Policy. Charges and counter-charges of border violation and aggression were exchanged along the frontier. On September 9, a few days before his departure for the U.S., Janos Kadar of Hungary attempted to mediate the disputes between China and India, hoping to appeal to his friendly relations with both parties. Khrushchev and Alexander Dubček of Czechoslovakia also appealed to China and India. However, China's reaction to the Soviet, Hungarian, and Czechoslovak appeal for "peaceful coexistence" with the West and India was not seen as encouraging; and the fallout of the tensions along the Himalayas caused worldwide speculation over the Warsaw Pact-Chinese alliance, which was based on common ideological, political, and military interests.

By the time the Sino-Indian border dispute developed into full-fledged fighting in the 1962 Sino-Indian War, the alliance between the world's two leading communist powers was irreparably shattered. Although the Warsaw Pact nations backed China's October 1962 peace offer, urging Nehru to accept it, Albania's and Romania's offer to deliver MiG fighter planes to India sent Sino-Albanian and Sino-Romanian relations into crisis. This also turned China against other Eastern European communist states. By the end of 1963, the Eastern Bloc and China were engaging in open polemics against each other, initiating a period of open hostility between the former allies that lasted for the remainder of the Cold War era.

== Culture and media ==
In the ensuing years of World War II in the United States, media and culture portrayed a general sense of anxiety and fear of the spread of the Soviet Union's communism in American entertainment, political, social, and scientific sectors. As tensions between the two nations increased over the 1940s, 1950s, and 1960s, public hysteria over communism subverting American daily life was coined the "Red Scare", but more specifically the Second red scare with respect to the 1950s. Media coverage of the Cold War served as a catalyst for acknowledging ideological differences between the two nations. Written and illustrative forms of communication were the main source of information before the 1960s in the United States; political expressions in American newspaper cartoons, fliers, and movie posters with "easily de-codable [text]" and "emotive images" largely served as a casting mold for solidifying American ideals against its Soviet counterpart. Indeed, both US and USSR media succeeded in producing rhetoric and imagery that bolstered the motives of their respective states while establishing a sense of jingoism in their people; which is effectively known as propaganda. The polarization of the Cold War era and the dread resulting from a Nuclear arms race between the US and USSR, in addition to a politicized system of media distribution, led to the escalated height of sentiments which included statements like "Better Dead Than Red" in American media and culture. As early as 1947 in the United States entertainment sector, the House Un-American Activities Committee (HUAC) began holding hearings regarding the political orientation of American entertainment professionals, starting with the famous Hollywood Ten trial that resulted in the conviction of 10 Hollywood directors and writers being charged with contempt of Congress, and eventually leading to the broader Hollywood blacklist; with the peak of the committee's actions occurring between 1953 and 1956. In the midst of all this included the McCarthy trials. Targets of HUAC's entertainment industry blacklist included directors, actors, screenwriters, musicians, and other prominent entertainment professionals, which were ultimately blacklisted from their careers for having been alleged communist members or having communist sympathies. Soviet communistic ideals being propagated into American life was used as justification for the tactics employed by the highly publicized HUAC and McCarthy trials. During this period in America, television stations and motion picture corporations were considerably influential on the minds of the public as associations between federal and private corporations became more intimately associated; a deliberate measure to promote positive consensus for military and intelligence efforts against the Soviet Union in a time of war.

After the downfall of Senator Joseph McCarthy and the McCarthy trials, which was due to his demagogic style and unsubstantiated accusations, the House Un-American Activities Committee shortly after began its descent into ruin by the mid-late 1950s and early 1960s, and later was officially dismantled in 1975. Just prior to the beginning of the 1960s, Harry S. Truman proclaimed that the committee was the "most un-American thing in the country today". Prior to these events, there had never been such a socially and politically significant issue publicized to the American populace within culture and media regarding domestic threats to United States democracy during the 20th century. During this period, Cold War themes first entered mainstream culture as a public preoccupation. The 1959 film On the Beach, for example, depicted a gradually dying, post-apocalyptic world that remained after a nuclear Third World War.

== Computers ==
Computer technology began to be influential in the mid-1940s during World War II and continued to increase in use during the 1950s and 1960s. The first electronic digital computers were used for large-scale military calculations. These computers would go on to help scientists in the fields of ballistic missiles, nuclear missiles, and anti-missile defense systems.

The Soviet Union faced a dilemma in that Western science was what Soviet scientific progress had been measured against. The results were that many Soviets were denouncing Western science but would turn around and describe a national need for the same theory they just denounced. The Soviet Union first began getting reports about electronically stored digital programs designed and built in Britain and the United States in the 1940s which got great attention from Soviet mathematicians and physicists working on defense projects that needed large amounts of computation. Soviet scientists got information about these computers from publications and survey articles. But they may have also got some of this information through their intelligence channels. The first electronic digital computers were used for large-scale military calculations. Ballistic missile programs were major clients of Soviet digital computing and were used for calculating missile trajectories which the first problem solved but the large high speed computer M-2, was the calculation of thermodynamic and hydrodynamic parameters for missile design. Anti-missile defenses also pushed for computer developments. One of the first problems solved by a computer was the calculation of the dependency of the target destruction probability on the detonation efficiency of fragmentation warheads.

The U.S. saw that using computers for military purposes would be beneficial and this came during the beginning of the Cold War. The Soviet Union also began to integrate computers into military programs and so the competition between the Soviet Union and the United States with computers began. The U.S. quickly started to adapt computers for defense and military purposes. The air force was one of the first military branches to adapt and use computers for their uses. The air force established a Reeves analogue computer at the Wright Air Development Center at Daytona for developing weapons systems. It had already been used in the Korean War to track enemy shells back to their source. The U.S. Navy then deployed its Naval Ordnance Research Calculator (NORC) as a means of accurately firing a naval gun at a target, taking into account the multiple variables of ship speed, wind velocity, direction and roll and pitch of the vessel. As the United States knew how computers would impact military programs, they began collecting what information they could on how the Soviet Union was coming on with their own computer program. The information the United States got was that the Soviet Union was not really able to keep up with the U.S. because they had insufficient and poor standards of equipment needed for making computers. A U.S. report of 1959 demonstrated that whereas the Soviets had 400 general-purpose digital computers of all types, the U.S. had produced more than 4000. The U.S. had a good lead in computer development against the Soviet Union. Not only were the military branches using computers avidly but the civilian population also got to be able to use computers. 66% of computers in the United States were used for military purposes while 30% were used for civilian uses. Computers played a big role in the military after World War II while also being available to civilians and the U.S. led this change into the technical world through the 1950s and 1960s.

== See also ==
- History of the Soviet Union (1953–1964)
- History of the United States (1945–1964)
- Timeline of events in the Cold War
- McCloy–Zorin Accords
