= The Children of June '56 =

Sculpture in Poznań, Poland

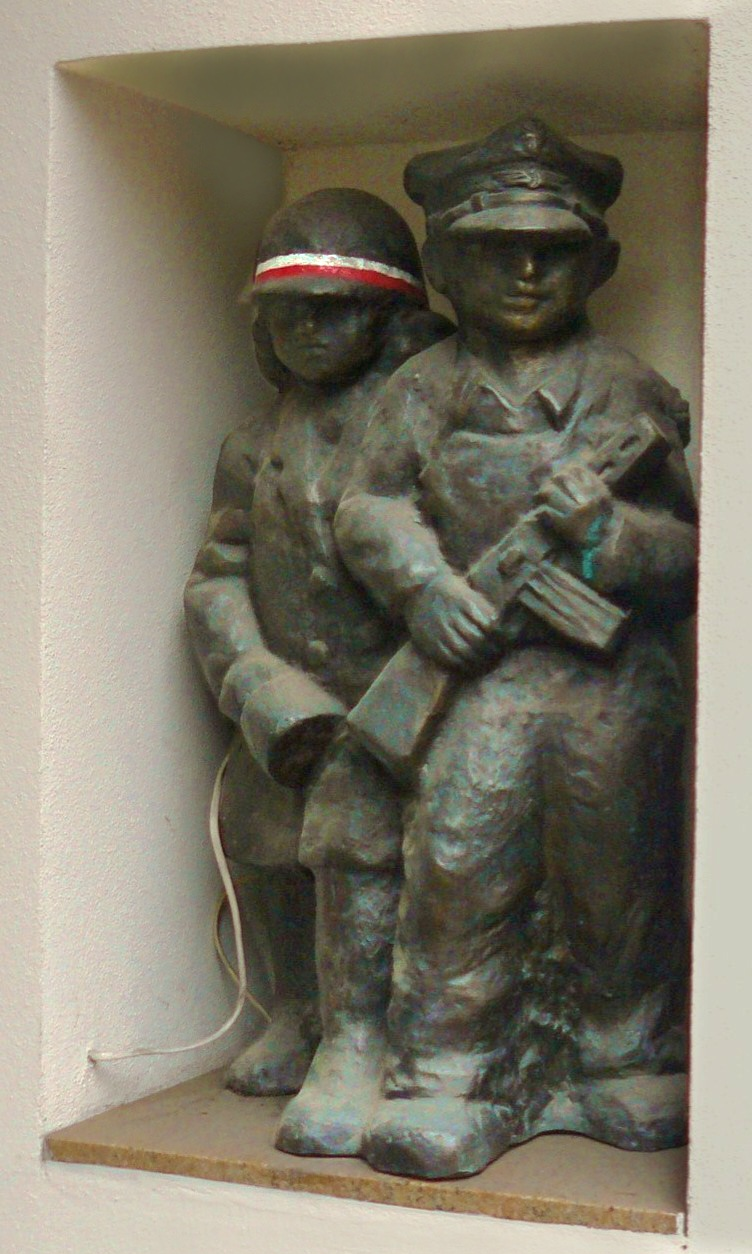
- The sculpture in 2011.
- Interactive map of The Children of June '56
- Location: 3 Młyńska Street, Poznań, Poland
- Coordinates: 52°24′38.49″N 16°55′33.47″E
- Type: Statue
- Material: Bronze
- Opening date: 23 June 1996

The Children of June '56 (Polish: Dzieci Czerwca ’56) is a bronze statue in the city of Poznań in Greater Poland Voivodeship, Poland. It is placed at 3 Młyńska Street, within the neighbourhood of Old Town. It is a sculpture of two small children wearing military uniforms, and is dedicated to the children who participated in the fights of the 1956 Poznań protests. It was unveiled at its current location on 23 June 1996.

== History ==
The sculpture is dedicated to the children who participated and died in the fights of the 1956 Poznań protests. It is placed within a niche of a wall in a tenement at 3 Młyńska Street, within the neighbourhood of Old Town. The sculpture was unveiled at its current location on 23 June 1996. Previously it was placed in front of the gate of the Poznań Detention Ward at 1 Młyńska Street, one of the sights of the fights during the protests. The monument was inspirted by the 1983 sculpture The Little Insurrectionist by Jerzy Jarnuszkiewicz, which is displayed in Warsaw, Poland, and is dedicated to the child soldiers of the Warsaw Uprising of 1944.

== Characteristics ==
The monument has a form of a bronze statue of two small children wearing military trench coats. The one on the right holds a machine gun and has a rogatywka hat, while the one on the left has a helmet, featuring a thin band with the colours of the flag of Poland. It is placed within a niche of a wall in a tenement at 3 Młyńska Street.
