= 1956 Poznań protests =

Protest against communist Polish government

Coordinates: 52°24′30″N 16°55′02″E

Poznań June
- Part of the Cold War
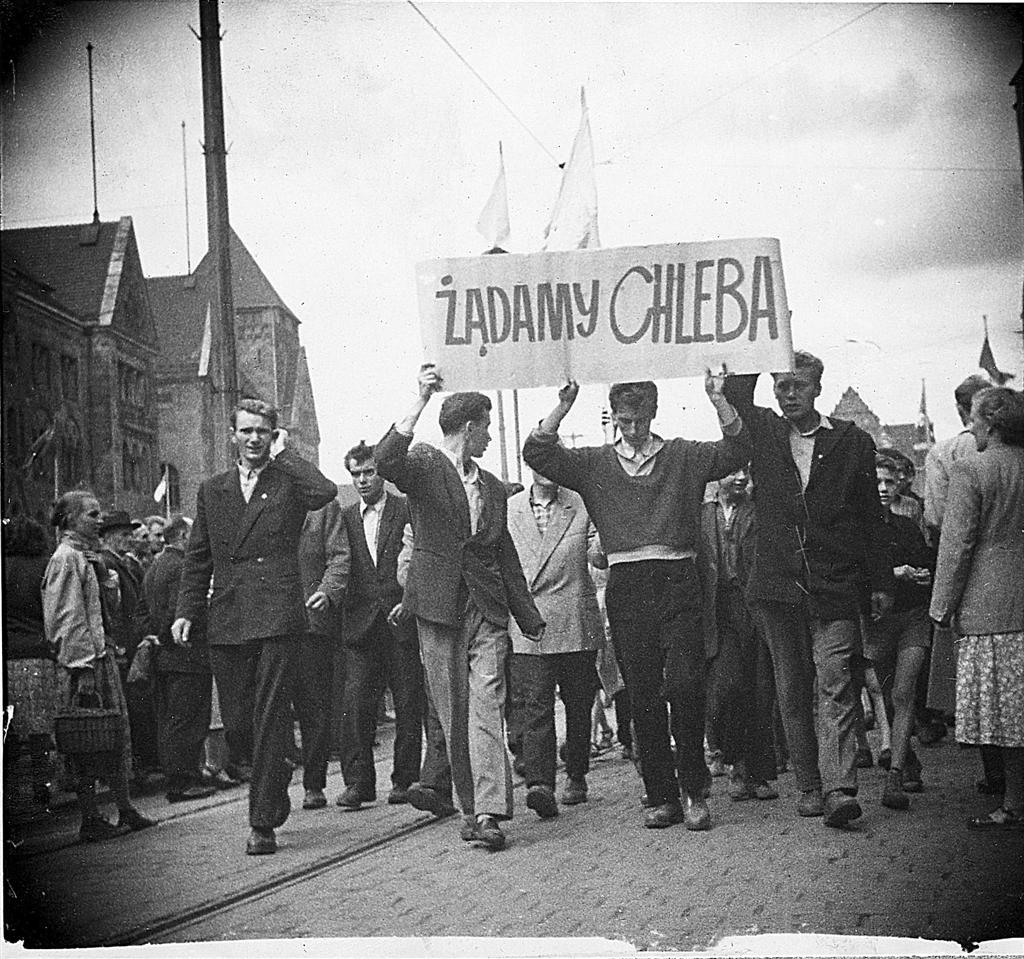
- The sign reads 'We demand bread!'
Date	28–30 June 1956
Location	Poznań, Polish People's Republic
Result	Protests suppressed

Belligerents
Protesters; Support: (Poland) Polish dissidents	(Poland) Polish People's Republic; Polish People's Army; Internal Security Corps; Służba Bezpieczeństwa

Commanders and leaders
No centralized leadership Prominent character: (Poland) Romek Strzałkowski †	(Poland) Edward Ochab (Poland) Stanislav Poplavsky

Strength
100,000	10,000; 390 tanks

Casualties and losses
57–100 killed; 600 wounded	8 killed

The first of several massive protests against the communist government of the Polish People's Republic took place in Poznań from 28 to 30 June 1956. Demonstrations by workers demanding better working conditions began at Poznań's Cegielski Factories and were met with violent repression.

A crowd of approximately 100,000 people gathered in the city centre near the local Ministry of Public Security building. About 400 tanks and 10,000 soldiers of the Polish People's Army and the Internal Security Corps under the command of the Polish-Soviet general Stanislav Poplavsky were ordered to suppress the demonstration and during the pacification fired at the protesting civilians.

The death toll is estimated from 57 to over a hundred people, including a 13-year-old boy, Romek Strzałkowski. Hundreds of people sustained injuries. The Poznań protests were an important milestone on the way to the Polish October and the installation of a less Soviet-controlled government.

== Background ==
After Joseph Stalin's death, the process of de-Stalinization prompted debates on fundamental issues throughout the entire Eastern Bloc. Nikita Khrushchev's speech On the Cult of Personality and Its Consequences had wide implications both inside the Soviet Union and in other communist countries. In Poland, in addition to the criticism of the cult of personality, popular topics of debate centered on the right to steer a more independent course of "local, national path[s] to socialism" instead of following the Soviet model down to every little detail; such views were shared by many Polish United Workers' Party members in the discussion and critique of Stalin's execution of older Polish communists from the Communist Party of Poland during the Great Purge. The death of Poland's hardline Communist leader Bolesław Bierut on 12 March 1956—allegedly from shock at the content of the Secret Speech—gave further fuel to the movement for change.

Anti-communist resistance in Poland was also bolstered, and a group of opposition leaders and cultural figures founded the Crooked Circle Club (Polish: Klub Krzywego Koła) in Warsaw. It promoted discussions about Polish independence, questioned the efficiency of the state controlled economy, and government disdain and even persecution of World War II veterans of Polish Armed Forces in the West and Armia Krajowa. While the intelligentsia expressed their dissatisfaction with discussions and publications (bibuła), workers took to the streets. The living conditions in Poland did not improve, contrary to government propaganda, and workers increasingly found that they had little power compared to bureaucracy of the Party (nomenklatura).

The city of Poznań was one of the largest urban and industrial centers of the Polish People's Republic. Tensions were growing there, particularly since autumn of 1955. Workers in the largest factory in the city, the Joseph Stalin Metal Industries, were complaining about higher taxes for the most productive workers (udarnik), which affected several thousands of workers. Local directors were unable to make any significant decisions due to micromanagement by the higher officials; over several months, petitions, letters and delegations were sent to the Polish Ministry of Machine Industry and the Central Committee of Polish United Workers' Party, to no avail.

Finally, a delegation of about 27 workers was sent to Warsaw around 23 June. On the night of 26 June, the delegation returned to Poznań, confident that some of their demands had been considered in a favourable light. However, the next morning, the Minister of Machine Industry met with the workers and withdrew several promises that their delegation had been given in Warsaw.

== Strikes ==
On 28 June 1956, a spontaneous strike started at 6:30 a.m. at the multifactory complex of the Joseph Stalin Metal Industries (ZiSPO). Around 80% of its workers, most of whom had lost bonus pay in June as the government suddenly raised the required work quota, took to the streets demanding pay compensation and some concessions of freedom, marching towards the city centre. Workers at other plants, as well as institutions and students, joined the procession.

Between 9 and 11 a.m., about 100,000 people gathered on the Adam Mickiewicz Square in front of the Imperial Castle in Poznań, surrounded by buildings occupied by the city and Party authorities and police headquarters. The demonstrators demanded lower food prices, wage increases and the revocation of some recent changes in the law that had eroded workers' conditions. They further requested a visit from Polish Prime Minister Józef Cyrankiewicz, as the local government declared that they had no authority to solve the workers' problems. Some police officers also joined the crowd.

After 10 a.m., the situation rapidly deteriorated, with rumours spreading that members of the negotiating delegation had been arrested. The local units of the regular police (Milicja Obywatelska) were unable to contain the crowd and the situation turned into a violent uprising as the crowds stormed the prison at Młyńska Street, where members of the delegation were believed to have been imprisoned; hundreds of prisoners were released around 10:50 am. At 11:30 am, the arms depot at the prison building was seized and the firearms distributed among the demonstrators.

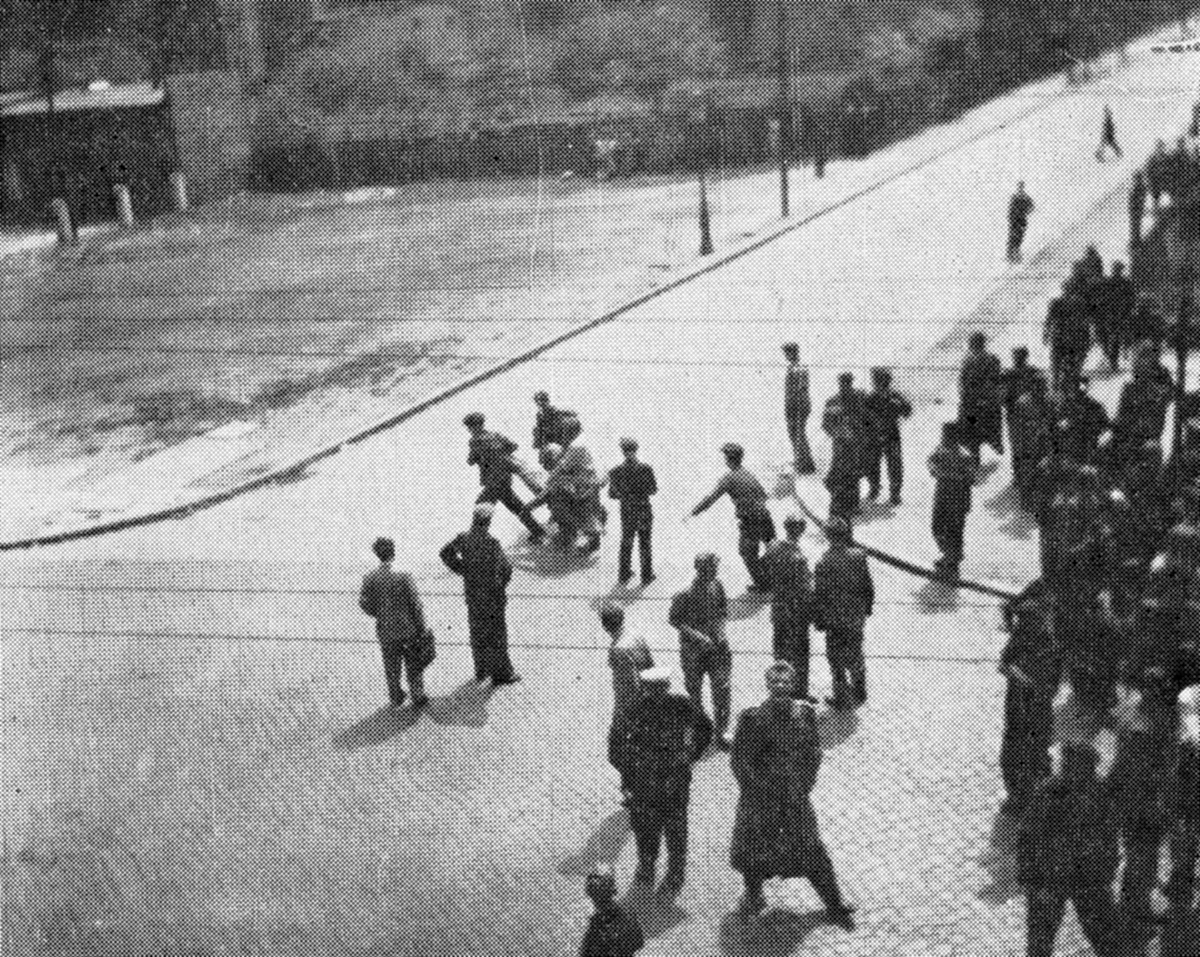
Poznań 1956, Kochanowskiego Street; transporting one of the victims

The crowd ransacked the Communist Party's local headquarters and then, at around 11 a.m., attacked the office of the Ministry of Public Security on Kochanowskiego Street, but were repulsed when the first shots were fired from its windows into the crowd. From then until 6:00 pm, they seized or besieged many government buildings and institutions in and around Poznań, including the district courthouse and the prosecutor's office, the radio jamming station on Dąbrowskiego Street, and police stations in Junikowo, Wilda, Swarzędz, Puszczykowo and Mosina. The prison camp in Mrowino and the military school at the Poznań University of Technology were seized and weapons taken. The police documents at the local police station, procuratorate and courthouse were destroyed.

In the meantime, at about 11:00 am, 16 tanks, 2 armored personnel carriers and 30 other vehicles were sent from the Officers' School of Armored and Mechanized Formations, a Poznań garrison, to protect the designated buildings, but no shots were exchanged between them and the insurgents. These soldiers engaged in friendly conversation with the protesters; some reports state that two tanks were seized and some troops disarmed. Konstantin Rokossovsky, the Soviet general, and Poland's Defence Minister, then decided to take personal control, and the situation changed dramatically.

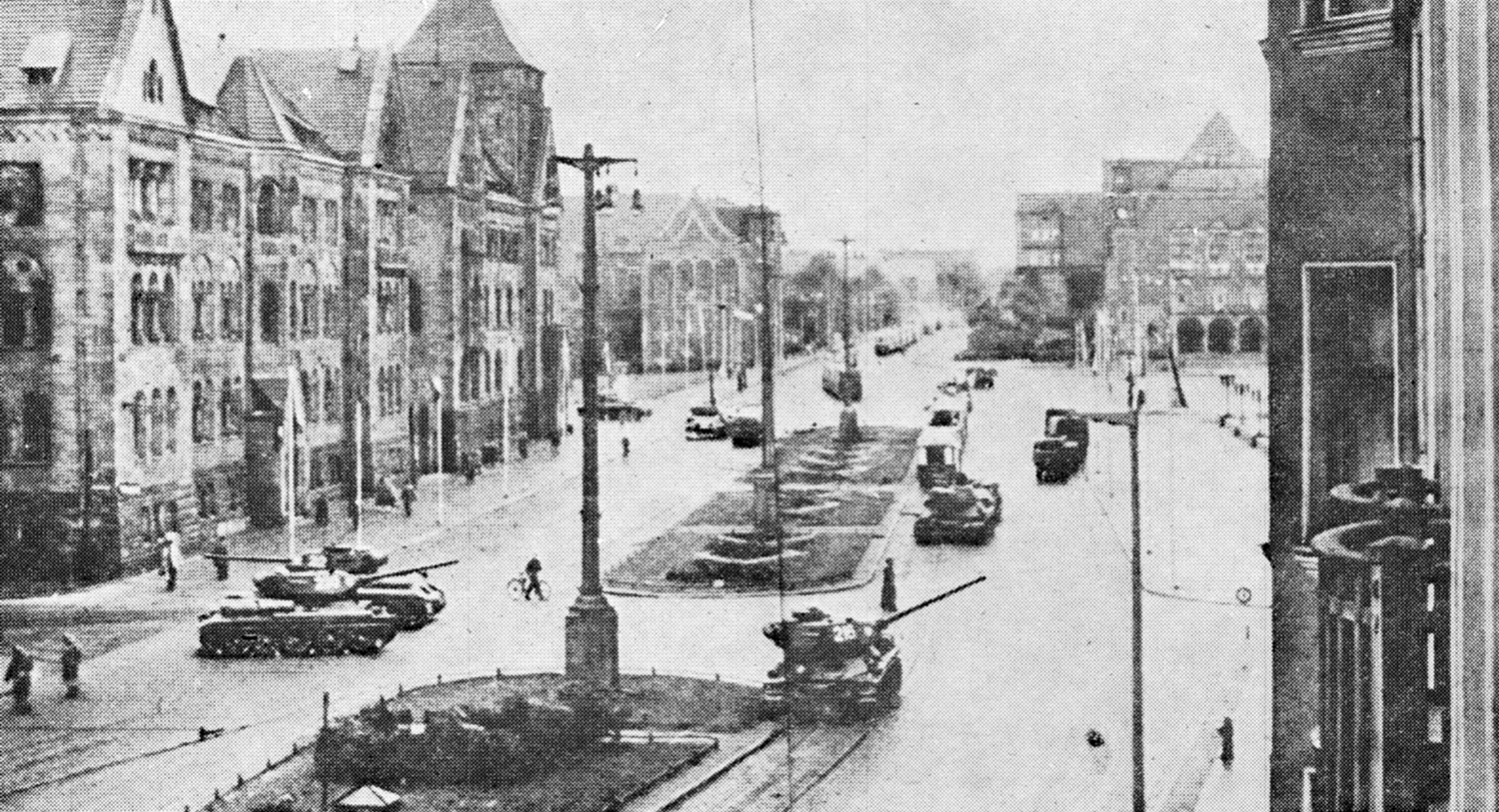
Tanks on the empty Joseph Stalin Square in the center of Poznań

Rokossovsky sent his deputy, the Polish-Soviet general Stanislav Poplavsky, and a group of lower Soviet officers, with orders to put down the protest in a manner consistent with Russian standards, intending to end the demonstrations as soon as possible to prevent an occurrence similar to the uprising of 1953 in East Germany, when a similar protest, not quelled in time, spread to many other regions. The Russian officers arrived at 2 p.m. at Ławica Airport and took command. Poplavsky did not bother to use local regulars from Poznań garrisons, instead taking other troops from Silesian Military District and recalling special troops from the Biedrusko military base north of Poznań. The troops were told that the protesters were led and organized by "German provocateurs", who were attempting to darken Poland's image during the ongoing Poznań International Fair.

Between 4 p.m. and 5 a.m. the following day, troops from the Polish 10th Armored Division, Polish 19th Armored Division, Polish 4th Infantry Division and Polish 5th Infantry Division, totaling 10,300, and the Internal Security Corps, under the command of Poplavsky, entered Poznań. A two-hour long procession of tanks, armored cars, field guns, and lorries full of troops went through the city and surrounded it. At 9 p.m., a wave of detentions began. The detainees were taken to Ławica Airport, where they were subjected to brutal interrogation; 746 persons were detained until 8 August. The protests continued until 30 June, when the troops finally pacified the city, after exchanging fire with some of the more violent demonstrators. At 7:30 a.m. on 29 June the Prime Minister arrived and infamously declared on the local radio station that "any provocateur or lunatic who raises his hand against the people's government may be sure that this hand will be chopped off."

There are varying estimates of casualties. The historian Łukasz Jastrząb from the Institute of National Remembrance (IPN) estimates casualties at 57 dead and about 600 wounded (including eight on the side of the government), noting that larger estimates, such as that by IPN scholar, Stanisław Jankowiak, who places the figure at slightly over 100, are not fully supported by available data. Estimates of a similar range, such as the "over 70 deaths", can be found in media reports.

== Aftermath ==
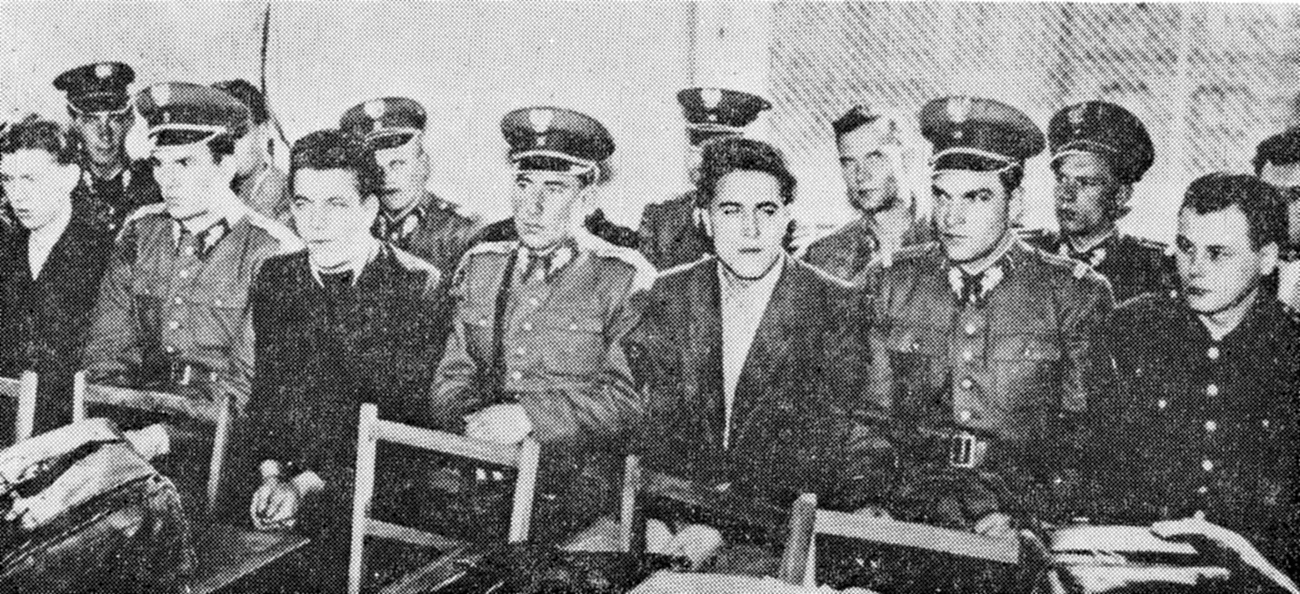
Trial of "the Nine" after riots June 1956

About 250 people were arrested in the first few days, including 196 workers; several hundred others were arrested in the following weeks. Stanisław Hejmowski, Michał Grzegorzewicz, and Gerard Kujanek (among others), the lawyers who defended them, faced repressions by the government for their statements that the government's actions had led to the death of innocent civilians. The government failed in its attempts to coerce the detainees into stating that they were provoked by foreign (Western) secret services; nonetheless, this became the official line of the government for years to come.

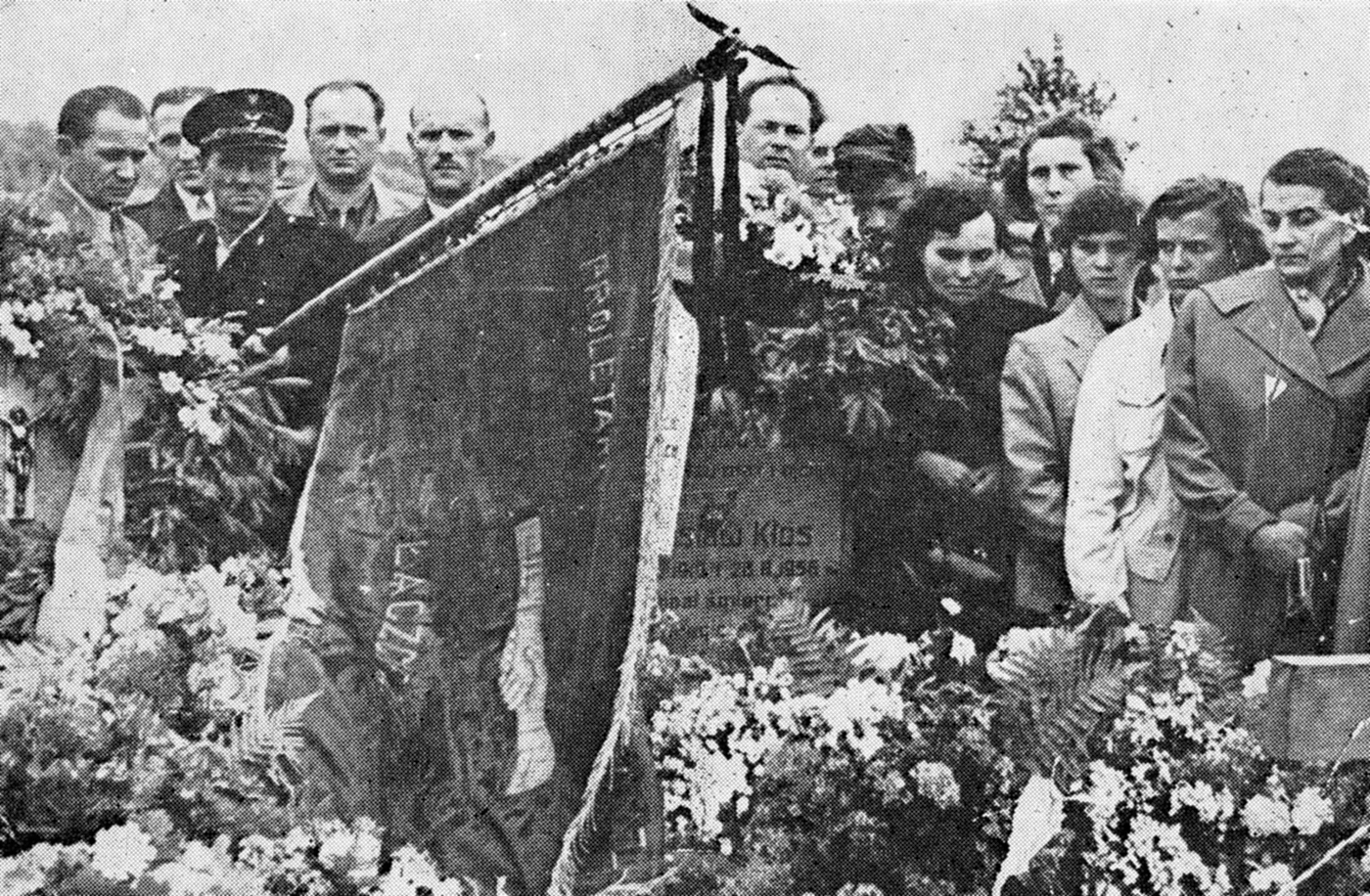
Funeral of one of the victims in June 1956

Soon the ideologues realized that they had lost the support of the Soviet Union, and the regime turned to conciliation by announced wage rises and other reforms. Realizing the need for a change in leadership, the Polish communists chose a new leader, Władysław Gomułka, who was considered a moderate; this transition is known as Polish October (or "Gomułka Thaw"). In spite of this, the communist authorities censored all information on the Poznań events for a quarter of a century.

Historians were denied source materials for research, and censorship was effective in eliminating any mention of the events of June 1956 from publicly available sources. Persecution of the most active participants would be carried out for many years. The memory of the events was preserved by the participants and members of opposition. After the Gdańsk Agreement in 1980, the Solidarity movement, as one of its first actions decided to raise a monument in memory of the Poznań June 1956 events.

Many historians consider the Poznań 1956 protests to be an important milestone in modern history of Poland, and one of the events that precipitated the fall of communism in Poland. Nonetheless, the protests of 1956 were not motivated by clearly anti-communist ideology; the workers' demands were mostly of an economic nature, centering around better work conditions rather than any other clearly articulated political objectives. The workers sang "The Internationale" and their banners read "We demand bread." It was the government's consistent failure to fulfil the first demand which eventually led to the demands for political change, but even during the history of Solidarity few demanded wide political reforms.

=== Commemoration ===
On 23 June 1996, the Children of June of '56 was unveiled in Poznań. It stands in dedication to the children who participated in the protests.

On 21 June 2006, to commemorate the 50th anniversary of the events, the Polish parliament Sejm declared 28 June to be a national holiday in Poland; the Day of Remembrance of the Poznań June 1956.

== See also ==
- Poznań '56, a 1996 film
- Plzeň uprising of 1953, violent protest of workers in Czechoslovakia
- Hungarian Revolution of 1956
- December 1970 protests in Poland
