= Romek Strzałkowski =

Polish child protester (1943–1956)

- Born: Roman Strzałkowski; 20 March 1943; Warsaw, General Government
- Died: 28 June 1956 (aged 13); Poznań, Polish People's Republic
- Other name: Romek
- Known for: victim of the suppression of the 1956 Poznań protests

Roman "Romek" Strzałkowski (20 March 1943 – 28 June 1956) was a Polish boy. He was killed during anti-communist protests in Poznań in 1956. He has become one of the best-known symbols of anti-communist resistance in Poland. Since 1981, one of Poznań's streets has been named after him.
