= Stanislav Poplavsky =

Polish-Soviet general (1902–1973)

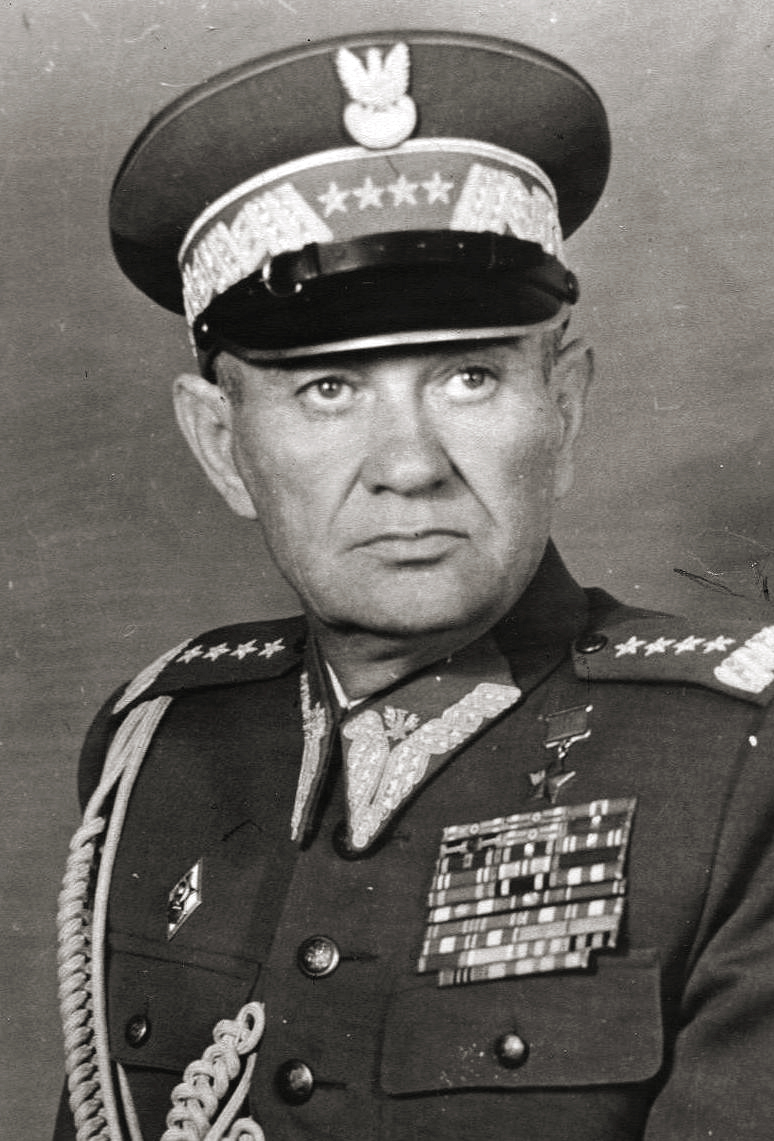
- Born: Stanislav Gilyarovich Poplavsky; 22 April 1902; Vendichany village, Mogilev district, Podolsk province, Russian Empire (now in Mogilev-Podolsky district, Vinnytsia region, Ukraine)
- Died: 10 August 1973 (aged 71); Moscow, Russian SFSR, Soviet Union
- Burial place: Novodevichy Cemetery
- Military career
- Allegiance: Soviet Union; Polish People's Republic
- Service years: 1920–1963
- Rank: Army General
- Commands: 720th Rifle Regiment; 363rd Infantry Division Headquarters; 45th Rifle Corps, 5th Army; Polish Second Army; Polish First Army
- Conflicts: Russian Civil War; World War II; Battle of Moscow; Defense of Pomeranian Wall; East Prussian Operation; Vistula-Oder Offensive; Battle of Berlin; Poznań June
- Awards: Hero of the Soviet Union; Virtuti Militari; Several others (see below)

Stanislav Gilyarovich Poplavsky (Russian: Станислав Гилярович Поплавский, Polish: Stanisław Popławski, 22 April 1902 – 9 August 1973) was a Soviet and Polish general of Polish ethnicity. A divisional and corps commander in the Red Army during the Second World War, he was transferred to the Polish People's Army in 1944 and commanded the Polish First Army in the Battle of Berlin, for which he was made a Hero of the Soviet Union. After the war, he served as commander of the Polish Land Forces and deputy minister of national defence, and in June 1956, he commanded the troops that suppressed the Poznań protests. He returned to the Soviet Union later that year.

== Early life ==
Poplavsky was born on 22 April 1902 in the village of Vendichany in Podolia, into an ethnically Polish peasant family with eight children. In 1914, the family moved to Kiev Governorate, where he completed primary school. According to his memoirs, he was drafted into the Red Army in February 1920 and fought in the Russian Civil War. The biography in Geroi strany instead records service in a food-requisition detachment in 1919 and his call-up to the Red Army in May 1923, as a private in the 130th Bogunsky Territorial Rifle Regiment.

== Interwar career ==
In October 1924, Poplavsky entered the regimental school of the 295th Dnieper Rifle Regiment, after which he served as a junior commander and head of a weapons depot. He joined the Communist Party in 1928. In 1930, he graduated from the Kharkov School of Red Commanders, and after serving as a platoon commander in a regimental school, he returned to the Kharkov school in November 1931 as a platoon commander, assistant company commander and company commander. He graduated from the Frunze Military Academy in 1938.

In June 1938, Poplavsky was dismissed from the Red Army, probably because of his Polish origin, according to Geroi strany. He was reinstated in January 1939 and appointed an assistant and junior instructor in general tactics at the Frunze Academy. In July 1940, he became chief of the operations section on the staff of the 162nd Rifle Division in the Western Special Military District.

== World War II ==
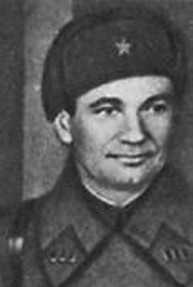
Poplavsky in a Red Army uniform (1930s)

In July 1941, Poplavsky took command of the 720th Rifle Regiment, which fought in the Smolensk and Vyazma defensive operations. During the Vyazma and Bryansk defensive operation, his regiment was surrounded, but on 6 October, he broke out of the encirclement and withdrew his regiment along with several other units of the 19th Army. For his conduct in the battles of the summer and autumn of 1941, he was awarded the Order of the Red Banner. In September 1941, he became chief of staff of the 363rd Rifle Division, which was formed in the Ural Military District and entered combat in December as part of the 30th Army of the Kalinin Front in the Klin–Solnechnogorsk offensive.

In early 1942, Poplavsky was given command of the 185th Rifle Division of the 29th Army during the Rzhev–Vyazma operation. The division was encircled, but with supplies delivered by air, it held out and broke through to the main Soviet forces at the end of February 1942. In May 1942, he took command of the 256th Rifle Division of the 39th Army, and from late 1942, he commanded the 220th Rifle Division on the Kalinin and Western Fronts. During the Rzhev–Vyazma offensive of March 1943, his division advanced more than 170 kilometres and crossed six rivers. He was promoted to major general on 14 February 1943.

In June 1943, Poplavsky took command of the 45th Rifle Corps, which fought in the Smolensk offensive and Operation Bagration and was awarded the honorific "Neman".

=== Polish People's Army ===
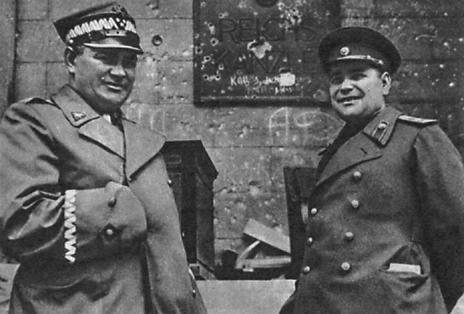
Poplavsky (left) with Soviet General Sergey Shatilov at the Reich Chancellery building in Berlin (May 1945)

In September 1944, at the request of the Polish government, Poplavsky was transferred to the Polish People's Army, one of many Soviet officers seconded to it. He commanded the Polish Second Army from September 1944 and the Polish First Army from December 1944. He was made a generał dywizji (major general) of the Polish Army on 3 December 1944. Under his command, the First Army took part in the Vistula–Oder Offensive, the East Pomeranian Offensive and the Battle of Berlin. On 11 May 1945, he was promoted to generał broni in the Polish Army. By a decree of 29 May 1945, he was made a Hero of the Soviet Union, with the Order of Lenin and the Gold Star medal (No. 6485), for his command of the First Polish Army during the crossing of the Oder and the battles for Berlin.

== Post-war career ==
After the war, Poplavsky remained in the Polish Army, along with thousands of other Soviet officers, including Marshal Konstantin Rokossovsky, who held command or advisory posts in almost all Polish military units. In September 1945, he became commander of the Silesian Military District, and in November 1947, he became commander-in-chief of the Polish Land Forces. In March 1949, he was appointed chief inspector of military schools, and in April 1949, he became second and then first deputy minister of national defence. From March 1950, he was chief inspector of combat training and deputy minister of national defence. He was promoted to colonel general in the Soviet Army on 11 July 1946 and to army general in both the Soviet and Polish armies on 12 August 1955.

From 1947 to 1956, Poplavsky was a deputy to the Legislative Sejm and then to the Sejm of the first term, and from 1949 to 1956, he was a member of the Central Committee of the Polish United Workers' Party. In 1950, he became president of the sports club Legia Warsaw, replacing General Eugeniusz Luśniak, who was forced out during a purge of pre-war officers, arrested, convicted of espionage and sentenced to 15 years in prison, and who died in Wronki prison in 1954.

On 28 June 1956, during the 1956 Poznań protests, a group led by Poplavsky, as deputy minister of national defence, landed at Ławica airport in Poznań, and he took over command of the forces deployed against the protesters. On his orders, the 19th Armoured Division was sent into the city centre. In total, nearly 10,000 soldiers, 359 tanks and 31 assault guns were brought into Poznań, and between 57 and 79 people were killed, including eight soldiers and police officers.

During the political changes of autumn 1956, Soviet officers serving in the Polish Army were sent home, with some 30 of them leaving their Polish units by late November. Poplavsky returned to the Soviet Union, and in December 1956, he became first deputy chief inspector of the Soviet Ministry of Defence. He went on sick leave in May 1957, and from April 1958 until his death, he served as a military inspector-adviser in the Group of General Inspectors of the Ministry of Defence.

== Personal life and death ==
Poplavsky was married to Maja Poplavska, née Terpilowska (1911–1991), and they had a daughter, Izabela (1931–2011). He was an honorary member of the All-Union Philatelic Society. He died in Moscow on 9 August 1973 and was buried at the Novodevichy Cemetery (plot 7). A Polish delegation led by the minister of national defence, General Wojciech Jaruzelski, attended his funeral.

== Dates of rank ==
Insignia	Rank	Date	Ref.
	Major general, Red Army	14 February 1943	
	Generał dywizji, Polish Army	3 December 1944	
	Generał broni, Polish Army	11 May 1945	
	Colonel general, Soviet Army	11 July 1946	
	Army general, Polish Army and Soviet Army	12 August 1955	

== Awards ==
Commemorative medal.

- Soviet Union
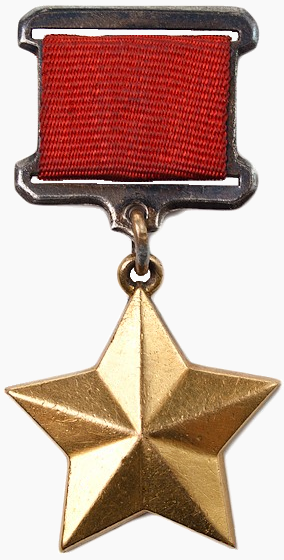
  - Hero of the Soviet Union (29 May 1945)
  - Three Orders of Lenin (20 April 1942, 30 April 1945, 29 May 1945)
  - Order of the October Revolution (22 February 1968)
  - Order of the Red Banner, four times (9 August 1941, 30 January 1943, 3 November 1944, 13 June 1952)
  - Order of Suvorov, 1st class (6 April 1945)
  - Order of Suvorov, 2nd class (28 September 1943)
  - Order of Kutuzov, 2nd class (9 April 1943)
  - Order of Bogdan Khmelnitsky, 2nd class (4 July 1944)
  - Order of the Red Star (22 February 1961)
  - Medal "For the Defence of Moscow" (1944)
  - Medal "For the Liberation of Warsaw" (1945)
  - Medal "For the Capture of Berlin" (1945)
  - Medal "For the Victory over Germany in the Great Patriotic War 1941–1945" (1945)
  - Jubilee Medal "30 Years of the Soviet Army and Navy" (1948)
  - Jubilee Medal "40 Years of the Armed Forces of the USSR" (1958)
  - Jubilee Medal "Twenty Years of Victory in the Great Patriotic War 1941-1945" (1965)
  - Jubilee Medal "50 Years of the Armed Forces of the USSR" (1968)
  - Jubilee Medal "In Commemoration of the 100th Anniversary of the Birth of Vladimir Ilyich Lenin" (1969)
- Polish People's Republic
  - Order of Polonia Restituta, 1st class
  - Order of Polonia Restituta, 2nd class
  - Order of Polonia Restituta, 3rd class
  - Virtuti Militari, 2nd class (Commander's Cross)
  - Order of the Cross of Grunwald, 2nd class
  - Order of the Banner of Work, 1st class, twice
  - Gold Cross of Merit, twice
  - Silesian Uprising Cross
  - Medal of Victory and Freedom 1945
  - Medal "For Oder, Neisse and the Baltic"
  - Medal "For Warsaw 1939-1945"
  - Medal "For Participation in the Battles for Berlin"
  - Medal of the Armed Forces in the Service of the Fatherland (Silver medal)
  - Medal of the Armed Forces in the Service of the Fatherland, bronze
  - Medal of the 10th Anniversary of People's Poland
  - Brotherhood of Arms Badge
  - Wound Decoration, eight times
- Other countries
  - Military Order of the White Lion "For Victory" (Czechoslovakia)
  - Gold Star of the Czechoslovak Military Order for Liberty (Czechoslovakia)
  - Order of the Partisan Star, 1st class (Yugoslavia)
  - Order for Bravery (Yugoslavia)
  - Distinguished Service Cross (United States, 1945)

== Commemoration ==
- A memorial plaque to Poplavsky was installed in Kharkiv, and a street in Brest was named after him.
- In Poland, streets named after him were listed by the Institute of National Remembrance among names to be changed under the 2016 decommunization law.
- On 28 June 1974, the semi-container ship Generał Stanisław Popławski was launched at the Lenin Shipyard in Gdańsk, and it was scrapped in 1998.
- The Polish Army Officers' Training Centre in Rembertów bore his name from 1974 to 1989, and schools in Żory and Sosnowiec were named after him until the 1990s.
- In 1976, the Polish Mint issued a medal commemorating him.

== Works ==
- Poplavsky, S. G. (1963). Товарищи в борьбе [Comrades in the Struggle] (in Russian). Moscow: Voenizdat. Published in Polish as Towarzysze frontowych dróg (Warsaw, 1964) and in German as Kampfgefährten (Berlin, 1980).
