= Horka massacre =

Massacre of Polish soldiers by Nazi Germany

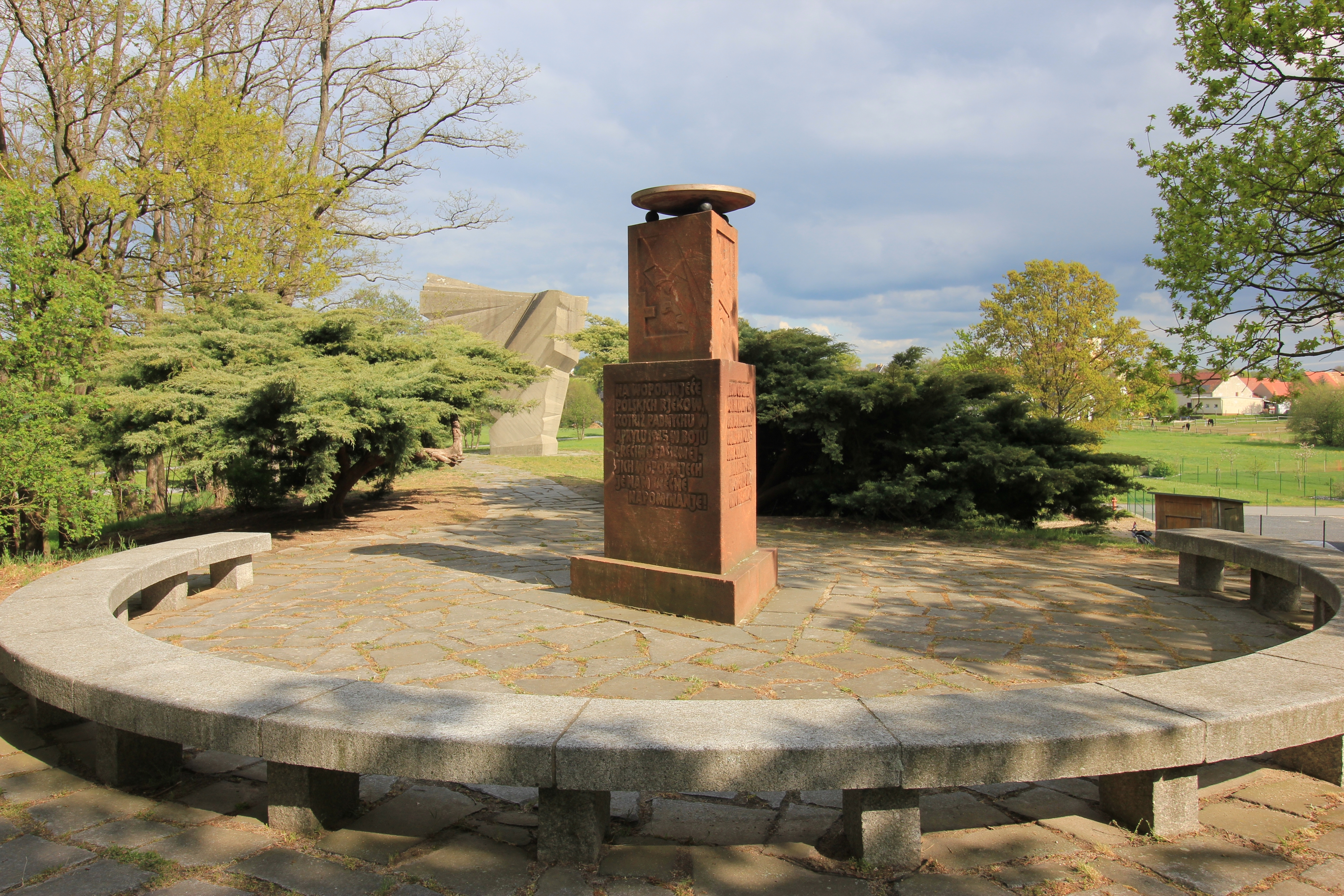
- Monuments on Fulksberg hill near Crostwitz commemorating fallen and murdered soldiers of the Second Polish Army
- Location: 51°15′46.0″N 14°15′14.0″E; Horka near Crostwitz
- Date: 26 April 1945
- Attack type: massacre
- Deaths: 150–300
- Perpetrators: Panzergrenadier Division Brandenburg; Free Ukraine 104th Anti-Tank Brigade

The Horka massacre was the murder of wounded soldiers and members of the medical staff of the Second Polish Army carried out by the Wehrmacht on 26 April 1945, in the final days of World War II, in the village of Horka near Crostwitz.

During the fighting in Lusatia in April 1945, the Polish 9th Infantry Division managed to advance to the outskirts of Dresden, but was soon surrounded. The order to turn east and join the main forces of the Second Polish Army came too late, and the map with the division's route accidentally fell into German hands. During the retreat, the 15th Independent Medical Battalion, which was evacuating the wounded from the divisional medical point, was surprised by the enemy while stopping in Horka. A massacre ensued, during which soldiers of the Panzergrenadier Division Brandenburg, likely supported by collaborators from the Free Ukraine 104th Anti-Tank Brigade, murdered between 150 and 300 Poles.

== Battle of Bautzen ==
On the night of 10–11 April 1945, units of the Second Polish Army took up positions on the eastern bank of the Lusatian Neisse, relieving the Soviet 13th Army. As part of the upcoming Battle of Berlin, the command of the 1st Ukrainian Front entrusted the Polish operational formation with the task of capturing Dresden and reaching the Elbe. (Note: In Polish literature, the Second Polish Army is usually assigned the task of solely covering the left flank of the 1st Ukrainian Front. According to Kania (2023, pp. 141–145), however, the content of Marshal Ivan Konev's directive No. 00211/op of 8 April 1945 clearly indicates that the Polish combat group was to participate in the attack on Dresden.) The same task was given to the neighboring Red Army formations – the 52nd Army and elements of the 5th Guards Army.

On 13 April, the first subunits of the Second Polish Army began combat operations aimed at reconnaissance of enemy positions and capturing of bridgeheads on the western bank of the Lusatian Neisse. On the morning of 16 April, the main forces of the army launched an attack. After three days of fierce fighting, the Poles managed to break through the main line of German defense, advancing about 30 kilometers deep into a 13-kilometer-wide attack zone. It became possible to move on to pursuit operations.

Soon, however, the situation of the Second Polish Army began to complicate. The German Army Group Centre, commanded by Field Marshal Ferdinand Schörner, was preparing a counterattack from the vicinity of Görlitz and Löbau against the left flank of the 1st Ukrainian Front. Meanwhile, Marshal Ivan Konev, preoccupied with the offensive the Berlin, underestimated the threat emerging to the south. The 1st Guards Cavalry Corps, which was originally supposed to strike in a south-westerly direction with the task of entering the rear of Army Group Centre and pinning down its reserves, was directed north-west on the night of 16–17 April. The 4th Guards Tank Corps, which was originally supposed to participate in the offensive on Dresden, was also redirected to the northwest on the second day of the operation. In addition, most of the forces of the 2nd Air Army were engaged in the Berlin direction, giving the Luftwaffe air superiority over Lusatia. To make matters worse, units of the 52nd Army, which were supposed to attack the left flank of the Second Polish Army, were blocked by the Germans on bridgeheads on the western bank of the Lusatian Neisse. Only the 7th Guards Mechanised Corps and the 254th Motor Rifle Division (the so-called Korchagin Group) managed to break through the front, but they soon became embroiled in fierce fighting in Bautzen.

On the third day of the operation, the commander of the Second Polish Army, General Karol Świerczewski, became aware of the threat emerging on his left flank. He managed to obtain the consent of the 1st Ukrainian Front command to temporarily switch to defense. Only the 9th Infantry Division and the 3rd Armoured Brigade, along with several smaller units, continued their advance towards Dresden, while the 1st Armoured Corps, together with the 8th Infantry Division and the entire army artillery, turned south. Thanks to these moves, the first German attack on the left flank of the Second Polish Army, carried out on 18–20 April south of Niesky, was repelled by the Poles.

After this failure, Field Marshal Schörner decided to shift the axis of attack slightly further west, towards Weißenberg and Bautzen. Meanwhile, before dawn on 21 April, Marshal Konev unexpectedly ordered the 1st Armoured Corps, together with three infantry divisions, to resume the offensive on Dresden. (Note: In Polish and foreign literature, there is a persistent opinion that it was General Karol Świerczewski, obsessed with the desire to capture Dresden, who failed to notice or disregarded the threat to the flanks of the Second Polish Army and independently decided to continue the offensive (Domański (2009, p. 53); Kopociński & Kopociński (2021, p. 79)). However, according to Kania (2023, p. 417), this is contradicted by the content of Marshal Koniev's order No. 00215/op of 21 April 1945.) As a result of this order, the Second Polish Army split into two groups, between which a rapidly widening gap formed. In addition, both Soviet intelligence and General Świerczewski were unaware that the enemy was also preparing a counterattack from the north, from the vicinity of Uhyst and Boxberg.

As a result, the German counteroffensive launched on 21 April led to the splitting of the Second Polish Army. The headquarters of the 5th Infantry Division were destroyed, as were the 16th Armoured Brigade and the 14th Anti-Tank Artillery Brigade. Other Polish tactical units also suffered heavy losses. In this critical situation, the units of the Second Polish Army began to concentrate near Bautzen, with the aim of stopping the advance of Army Group Centre and relieving the remnants of the Korchagin Group, which had been cut off in the city.

== Massacre of the medical convoy in Horka ==
=== Fighting of the 9th Infantry Division on the outskirts of Dresden ===
Upon learning of the successes of the German counteroffensive, the chief of staff of the 1st Ukrainian Front, General Ivan Petrov, agreed to halt the advance on Dresden and return to Bautzen with the 1st Armoured Corps, the 8th Infantry Division, and most of the army's artillery. However, the Soviet general was aware that reaching the Elbe was a political priority for Stalin. Therefore, he ordered the 9th Infantry Division, together with accompanying units – part of the 9th Anti-Tank Artillery Brigade, the 30th Sapper Battalion, the 44th Howitzer Artillery Regiment, and the 69th Anti-Aircraft Artillery Regiment – to remain in their current positions.

Meanwhile, from 22 April, the 9th Infantry Division fought on the outskirts of Dresden. Within four days, the gap between the division and the main forces of the army reached a width of 40 kilometers, and German units began pushing into it. Finding itself partially surrounded, the 9th Infantry Division took up defensive positions in the Radeberg, Pulsnitz, and Bretnig triangle. The Polish troops soon began to experience a shortage of ammunition and fuel, while having to repel attacks by the enemy, who was trying at all costs to destroy the advanced Polish group and thus eliminate the immediate threat to the capital of Saxony. Particularly fierce fighting took place around Großröhrsdorf and Bretnig. On the night of 24–25 April, after recapturing the first of these towns, the Germans murdered 23 seriously wounded soldiers in the captured medical station of the 1st Battalion of the 26th Infantry Regiment (according to Leszek Kania, members of the medical staff who remained with the wounded were also killed).

Ultimately, given the difficult situation of the main army forces repelling Schörner's attacks north of Bautzen, General Świerczewski ordered the 9th Infantry Division to withdraw from Dresden and join the rest of the Polish formation. A liaison officer, Major Konstantin Fedoseyev, was sent with the appropriate order to the division headquarters in Pulsnitz. After delivering the message, the major decided, despite warnings from Polish officers, to return to the army headquarters via a motorway partially occupied by Germans. As a result, on the way back, his car was fired upon by the enemy. The driver survived and managed to escape, but Fedoseyev was killed on the spot. Next to his body, the Germans found a map with the marked route of the 9th Infantry Division's retreat.

=== Massacre ===
While the 9th Infantry Division was preparing to retreat, its divisional medical point was deployed in Pulsnitz. Military medical personnel were caring for 282 wounded soldiers. Colonel Aleksander Łaski made his chief of staff, Colonel Grzegorz Kuczmisty, and his deputy for rear affairs, Lieutenant Colonel W. Jóźwienkiewicz, responsible for their safety. The latter was the officer who issued the official order to evacuate the divisional medical point from Pulsnitz.

Some sources suggest that Horka – a small village a few kilometers from Crostwitz – was to become the temporary resting place for the divisional medical point, according to Lieutenant Colonel Jóźwienkiewicz's orders. Other authors, however, state that the wounded and medical personnel were ultimately to be evacuated to Königswartha, located further to the northeast. The evacuation plan was to have the 15th Independent Medical Battalion (Note: It was one of five independent medical battalions assigned to the infantry division of the Second Polish Army. Their main task was to organize divisional medical stations and evacuate the wounded from individual regimental medical stations to them. During the Battle of Bautzen, the commander of the 15th Independent Medical Battalion was Lieutenant (Doctor) Igor Dzieszuk Ciszewski (Kopociński & Kopociński (2021, pp. 48, 80–81)). Records in the preserved register show that 124 non-commissioned officers and privates served in the battalion, 98 of whom took part in the fighting on the outskirts of Dresden. Over 60% of them came from Kresy (Kopociński & Kopociński (2021, pp. 95–96)).) move eastward along side roads and forest paths – through Elstra, Panschwitz and Kuckau, Horka, and Neschwitz.

The 15th Independent Medical Battalion was mainly equipped with horse-drawn wagons, so Lieutenant Colonel Jóźwienkiewicz assigned the 13th Motor Transport Company to support it. Thus, the evacuation column consisted of about 15–20 trucks, accompanied by horse-drawn wagons and one passenger car. Over 300 people, including 282 wounded, were loaded onto the vehicles marked with Red Cross symbols. Some authors state that the command of the 9th Infantry Division assigned one company of infantry or a "reinforced reconnaissance company" to escort the 15th Independent Medical Battalion. Zbigniew and Krzysztof Kopociński, on the other hand, claim that the medical column was moving without an escort, which they consider to be an "unforgivable error" on the part of Lieutenant Colonel Jóźwienkiewicz and other officers responsible for the evacuation of the wounded.

Leszek Kania states that the 15th Independent Medical Battalion, together with the wounded, left Pulsnitz at dawn on 26 April as the first of the 9th Infantry Division's units. Edmund Ginalski, claimed that due to the need to prepare vehicles for transporting the wounded, the column did not leave until after 4:00 PM (which, however, contradicts the accounts of the residents of Horka). Zbigniew and Krzysztof Kopociński assume that the 15th Independent Medical Battalion left Pulsnitz at 12:00 PM or shortly thereafter. Jacek Domański also indicates 12:00 PM as the start of the evacuation of the wounded.

Between 3:00 PM and 4:00 PM (according to Kania – "at noon"), the Polish column stopped for a break in Horka. Cars and horse-drawn wagons lined the entire length of the road that ran through the village. The seriously wounded were carried out of the vehicles and laid down in the central square, near the monument commemorating those who died in World War I. Their dressings were changed and meals were served. Many of the Sorbs living in the village helped the Poles in caring for the wounded and preparing meals.

Between 5:00 PM and 6:00 PM, German tanks and armored personnel carriers unexpectedly arrived from Jeßnitz or Crostwitz. The village came under heavy fire from cannons, grenade launchers, and machine guns. Chaos broke out in the Polish column as medics tried to quickly load the wounded onto cars and wagons. However, only 3 or 4 cars managed to escape, parking at the northwestern edge of the village near Doberschütz. Another vehicle following them was shot at and burst into flames. As a result, the road running through the village was blocked. At the opposite end of the village, several cars managed to turn around and drive off in the direction of Pulsnitz, but shortly afterwards they fell into a German ambush on the road between Elstra and Obersteina. The enemy burned all the vehicles and murdered the wounded passengers. Only one of the drivers, Private Stanisław Bagny, survived the massacre.

Meanwhile, Polish vehicles that remained in Horka came under heavy fire. The enemy disregarded the fact that they were clearly marked with Red Cross symbols. Some of the vehicles caught fire, and the seriously wounded people they were transporting burned alive. Panicked horses overturned wagons with wounded passengers inside. Medics and drivers, (Note: According to other sources – soldiers from the protection company (Kania (2023, p. 467)).) armed only with handguns, tried to fight back, but their resistance was quickly broken. Some (Note: Kania (2023, p. 467) states that the Germans captured and murdered "the majority" of the lightly wounded. Kopociński & Kopociński (2021, p. 95), on the other hand, point to eyewitness accounts which indicate that "many of the less seriously wounded managed to escape into the forest, which allowed them to avoid execution and then reach our or Soviet troops".) of the less seriously wounded, able to move on their own, managed to escape from Horka. However, many were captured and killed with rifle butts. After capturing the village, the Germans and their Eastern European collaborators murdered the wounded who were lying in unburned vehicles and proceeded to methodically hunt down and kill Poles who had hidden in the buildings of Horka.

Everyone was killed: the wounded, the sick, nurses, and doctors. No attention was paid to the Red Cross markings on the vehicles, which were protected by international agreement. The killings were barbaric; people were thrown out of vehicles, beaten with rifle butts, dragged along the ground, and shot in the back of the head. It was an inhuman massacre.

— Private Wacław Klentak, survivor of the Horka massacre

On the outskirts of the village, several Polish soldiers were taken prisoner, including the chaplain of the 9th Infantry Division, Captain Jan Rdzanek. After a brief interrogation, they were murdered with shots to the back of the head. However, the shot that the chaplain received was not fatal. Under cover of night, the wounded Father Rdzanek managed to escape from the place of execution, and the next morning he came across a retreating Polish unit. The story of his rescue caused a stir among the ranks of the 9th Infantry Division.

During the massacre, some villagers tried to save Poles. (Note: One of the surviving soldiers claimed that the inhabitants of Horka helped to catch Poles in hiding and even finished off the wounded with shovels (Kaczmarek (1966, p. 61)). However, Kopociński & Kopociński (2021, p. 87) consider this unlikely in light of the history of the region and the accounts of other witnesses, most of whom pointed to the friendly or at least neutral attitude of the inhabitants towards Polish soldiers.) Among those who survived was an unnamed Polish officer, who was hidden in Agnes Müller's basement. However, the attempt to help ended tragically for the Zschornack family. All of its members, including small children, were murdered by German soldiers after a wounded Pole was found hiding under a bed during a search of the house. Tragic events also took place on the farmstead belonging to the Sorbian Chěžkec (German: Keschka) family, known for their anti-Nazi views. Hana (Anna) Chěžkec and her daughter Lejna (Helene) hid about 10 wounded Poles in the buildings. When German soldiers arrived at the farm, the women did not admit to hiding anyone, but the perpetrators found most of the fugitives and immediately murdered them. Only two Poles who had hidden in the attic survived. Misinterpreting a conversation between the women and the German soldiers, they believed that their friends had been betrayed by Lejna Chěžkec and sentenced to death, so they shot her in the night before fleeing Horka.

=== Victims and perpetrators ===
Some Polish authors estimated that around 300 wounded soldiers and members of the military medical personnel were murdered in Horka. However, Zbigniew and Krzysztof Kopociński consider the number of around 150–200 victims to be more accurate. Among those killed were at least several soldiers of the 15th Independent Medical Battalion, including the medical director of the surgical platoon, Lieutenant Borys Humiecki, and senior surgical nurse, Warrant Officer Maria Skórnik.

Leszek Kania blames the soldiers of the Panzergrenadier Division Brandenburg for the massacre in Horka. Zbigniew and Krzysztof Kopociński also indicate that the crime was committed by soldiers of this division, specifically its 1st Regiment, commanded by Colonel Erich von Brückner. At the same time, they point to Ukrainian collaborators serving in the ranks of the Free Ukraine 104th Anti-Tank Brigade as likely to be jointly responsible for the massacre. (Note: Witnesses referred to these collaborators as "Vlasovites". Some authors were inclined to attribute joint responsibility for the massacre in Horka to Russian collaborators from the 1st Infantry Division of the Armed Forces of the Committee for the Liberation of the Peoples of Russia, commanded by Colonel Sergei Bunyachenko. In reality, this unit was fighting in a different area at the time. The Free Ukraine 104th Anti-Tank Brigade was the only cohesive unit composed of Eastern European collaborators that participated in the fighting against the 9th Infantry Division (Kopociński & Kopociński (2021, p. 87)).)

== Aftermath ==
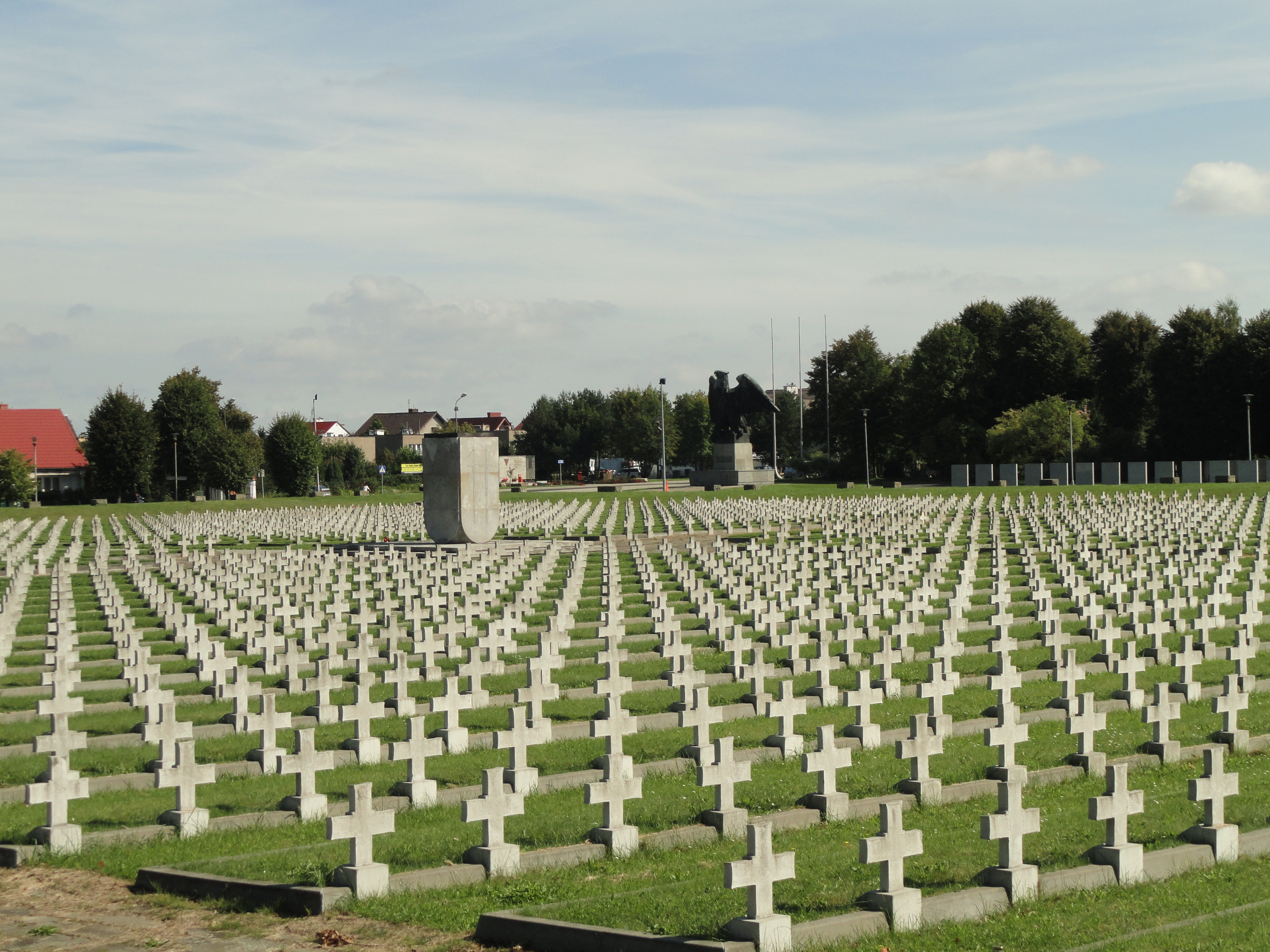
Cemetery of the Second Polish Army soldiers in Zgorzelec, where the recovered remains of the Horka massacre victims are interred, among others

The retreat of the remaining units of the 9th Infantry Division was also dramatic. It withdrew eastward in three regimental columns. While the main column was breaking through German positions in the "valley of death" near Kuckau, almost a thousand Polish soldiers were killed and another thousand were taken prisoner. The latter group included the seriously wounded division commander, Colonel Aleksander Łaski. Only the 28th Infantry Regiment, whose commander chose a different route of retreat, managed to break out of the encirclement relatively unscathed. As a result of the losses suffered, the 9th Infantry Division temporarily lost its combat capability. (Note: The irretrievable losses suffered by the 9th Infantry Division during the fighting in Lusatia amounted to approximately 1,400 killed and missing (Kania (2023, p. 520)).)

The massacre in Horka was not the only crime committed against soldiers of the Second Polish Army who were taken prisoner during the fighting in Lusatia. In the early days of May 1945, the body of the commander of the 5th Infantry Division, General Aleksander Waszkiewicz, was found in a forest between Jerchwitz and Stiftswiese (according to another source, in a forest near Förstgen). He had been taken prisoner by the Germans, tortured and murdered. Many other prisoners from the 5th Infantry Division and the 16th Armoured Brigade were also killed; among others, near Klitten, the mutilated bodies of 14 soldiers of the 5th Infantry Division, taken prisoner during the fighting near Tauer, were found after the battle. In Großröhrsdorf, 23 seriously wounded soldiers from the medical station of the 26th Infantry Regiment of the 9th Infantry Division were murdered. On 22 April, the Germans deliberately set fire to a school in Guttau which housed a Polish medical station, killing 24 soldiers, including a doctor and four nurses. A number of soldiers from the 9th Infantry Division, who were taken prisoner near Kuckau, were also killed by the Germans and their Ukrainian collaborators. The crimes against prisoners of war were attributed in particular to the Panzergrenadier Division Brandenburg; consequently, Poles usually did not take soldiers from this unit prisoner.

On 8 May 1945, members of the Polish military commission, appointed by order of the Chief of Staff of the Second Polish Army, General Iosif Sankowski, examined the site of the massacre in Horka. Two mass graves and one small grave were found. 44 victims were exhumed, 19 of whom were identified. Most of the bodies found bore signs of beating and even brutal torture (including gouged-out eyes or missing genitals). After the commission completed its work, all the bodies were buried in two newly dug graves. They were later transferred to the cemetery of the Second Polish Army soldiers in Zgorzelec. It is likely that the bodies of many victims still lie in unmarked graves in the forest near Horka. (Note: In particular, it was not possible to find the third mass grave, supposedly located in a forest on the road to Jeßnitz, which was mentioned by the inhabitants of Horka (Kopociński & Kopociński (2021, pp. 92–93)).)

The perpetrators of the crime have not been brought to justice.

== Commemoration ==
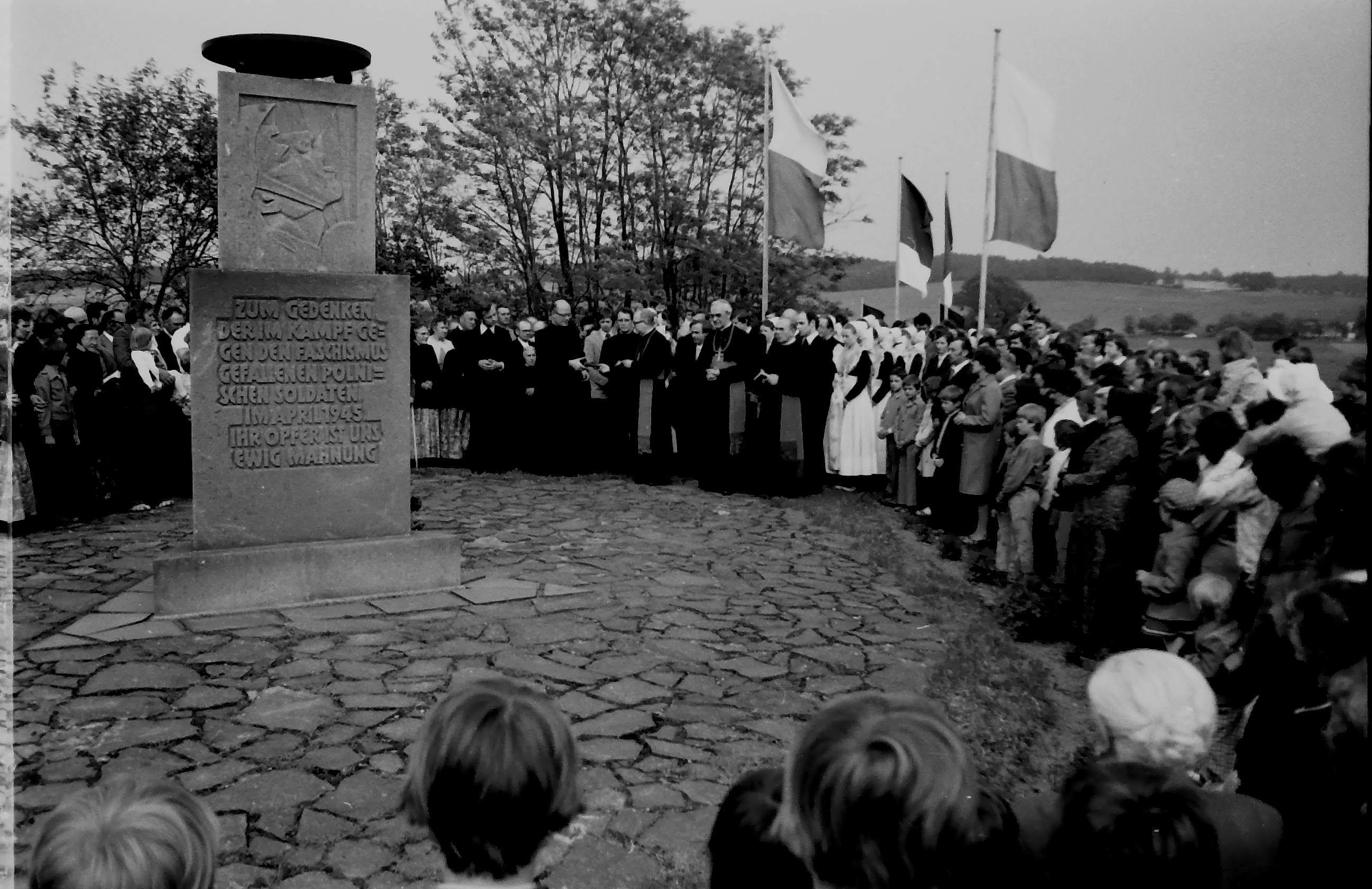
Ceremony at the monument near Crostwitz, 1977

On 14 October 1967, a monument sculpted by Curt Tausch was unveiled on Fulksberg hill near Crostwitz. It was built from red porphyry. Its walls feature reliefs depicting a mother, a dying soldier, and a blessing hand, with a sacrificial bowl at the top. It also bears an inscription in Polish, German, and Sorbian:

Honor to the memory of Polish soldiers who died fighting against fascism in April 1945. Their sacrifice is an eternal warning to us.

On 7 June 1980, a 6-meter-high mausoleum monument designed by Johannes Peschel was unveiled on the same hill, near the 1967 monument. It symbolizes the wing of an eagle taking flight, on which the Polish military eagle and the date 28.4.1945 are placed.

Both monuments commemorate the fallen soldiers of the Second Polish Army, especially the soldiers of the 9th Infantry Division who died in the "valley of death" near Kuckau and those murdered in Horka.

In 2015, the Borderlands Tourist and Sightseeing Society named after the Lviv Eaglets funded and donated a plaque to the residents of Horka commemorating the victims of the massacre of 26 April 1945. It was embedded in the foundation of a chapel located in the central part of the village. The plaque bears an inscription in Polish, German, and Sorbian:

Freedom is measured by crosses…
In memory of 300 wounded and defenseless Polish soldiers murdered in Horka on 25–28 April 1945 – their compatriots pay tribute to their sacrifice of life for peace and freedom.
KTTS Żary – Żagań – Horka, 28 April 2015.

== Bibliography ==
- Domański, Jacek (2009). Budziszyn 1945 [Bautzen 1945] (in Polish). Warsaw: Militaria. ISBN 978-83-7219-314-8.
- Kaczmarek, Kazimierz (1966). "Zbrodnie hitlerowskie na żołnierzach 2 Armii WP" [Nazi Crimes Against the Soldiers of the Second Polish Army]. Wojskowy Przegląd Historyczny (in Polish). 4.
- Kania, Leszek (2023). Budziszyn 1945. Ostatnia kontrofensywa Wehrmachtu: fakty i mity [Bautzen 1945. The Last Wehrmacht Counter-Offensive: Facts and Myths] (in Polish). Poznań: Pomost. ISBN 978-83-89789-60-0.
- Kopociński, Zbigniew; Kopociński, Krzysztof (2021). Horka – łużycka Golgota służby zdrowia 2. Armii Wojska Polskiego [Horka – The Lusatian Golgotha of the Medical Service of the 2nd Polish Army] (in Polish). Głogów: Państwowa Wyższa Szkoła Zawodowa w Głogowie. ISBN 978-83-63349-23-3.
