= Niederkaina massacre =

War crime committed by Red Army soldiers

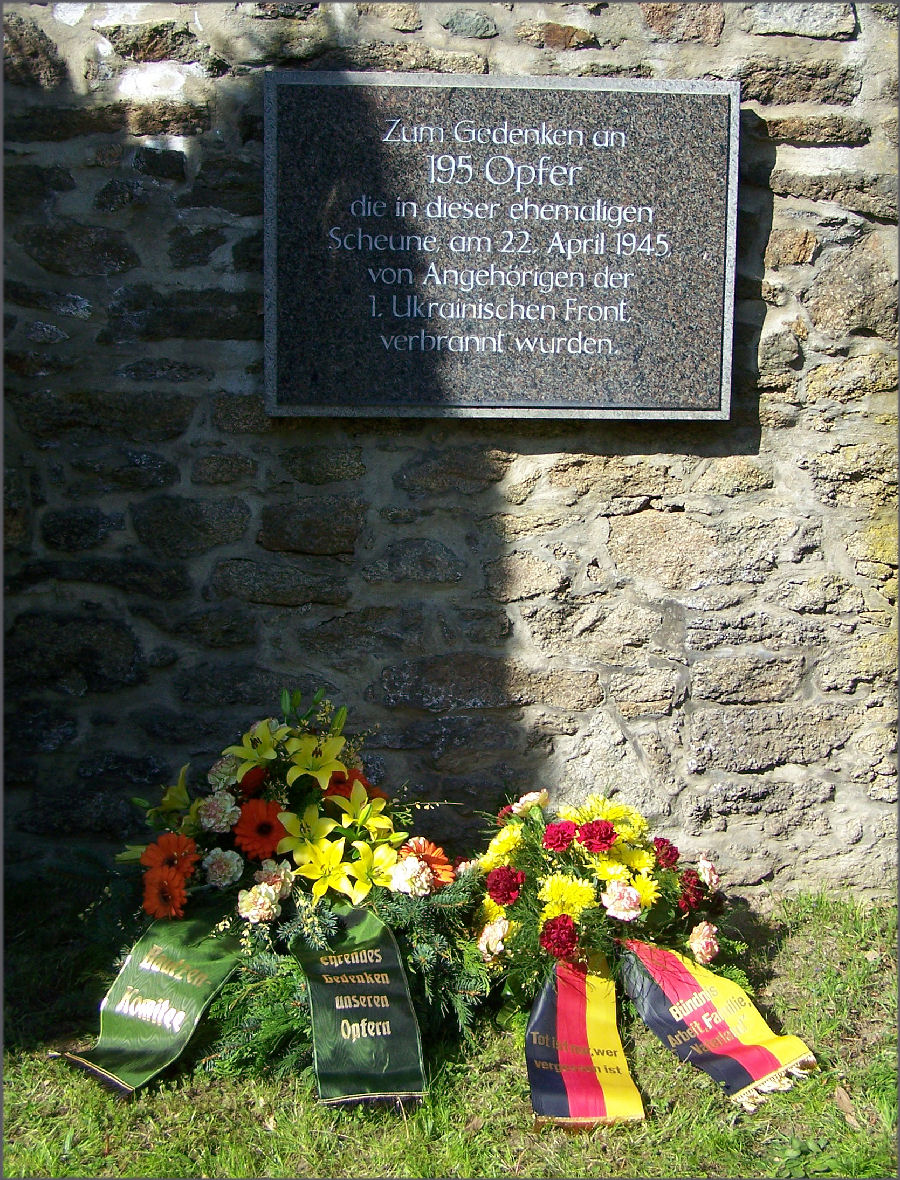
- Plaque commemorating the murdered prisoners of war (2009)
- Location: 51°11′30.1″N 14°28′42.55″E; Niederkaina, Nazi Germany
- Date: April 22, 1945
- Attack type: War crime
- Deaths: ~200 Volkssturm prisoners
- Perpetrator: 254th Motor Rifle Division

The Niederkaina massacre was a war crime committed by Red Army soldiers on 22 April 1945, in the final days of World War II, in the village of Niederkaina (now a district of Bautzen) in Lusatia. Approximately 200 German prisoners of war, members of the Volkssturm, were killed; nearly all were burned alive in a barn.

== Background of the events ==
On 16 April 1945, as part of the Battle of Berlin, the 52nd Army of the 1st Ukrainian Front began crossing the Lusatian Neisse river. However, they quickly encountered very strong resistance from the German Army Group Centre. Most of its divisions were blocked on the western bank of the river. Only the 7th Guards Mechanized Corps and the 254th Motor Rifle Division managed to break through the front, followed by the 294th Rifle Division. This grouping, commanded by General Ivan Korchagin, initially headed towards Weißenberg. This locality was captured on April 18. After leaving the 294th Rifle Division in Weißenberg, Korchagin directed the rest of his grouping towards Bautzen. By the afternoon of April 19, the tanks of the 7th Guards Mechanized Corps reached the eastern outskirts of the city.

The task of defending Bautzen was assigned by the German command to an improvised battle group led by Lieutenant Colonel Dietrich Höpke. This group was essentially a hodgepodge of front-line and rear-echelon units of the Wehrmacht and Waffen-SS, supported by three battalions of Volkssturm. It also included guards from the local prison, soldiers from the 831st Battalion of the Idel-Ural Legion, and young members of the Hitler Youth. However, to the surprise of the Soviets, the Bautzen garrison offered a tough and skillful resistance. The attempt to capture the city in a single assault turned into several days of street fighting.

== Murder of prisoners of war ==
On April 20, the Soviets began their assault on Bautzen. One of the first targets of the attack was the village of Niederkaina, located a few kilometers east of Bautzen (now a district of the city). After fierce fighting that continued into the evening hours, the 936th Rifle Regiment, supported by tanks from the 25th Guards Mechanized Brigade, managed to seize control of the village. During the fighting, the Red Army captured around 200 members of the Volkssturm. They were locked in a brick barn.

On the same day, General Mikhail Puteiko, commander of the 254th Motor Rifle Division, appeared at the front line in the industrial district of Bautzen. When he tried to rally his soldiers for an assault, he was shot in the head by a German sniper. He was immediately evacuated to the rear, but despite the efforts of the doctors, they were unable to save his life. The general died on April 21 without regaining consciousness.

Puteiko was extremely popular among his soldiers. When the news of his death reached the division, there was an uproar among the ranks. Seeking to avenge their commander's death, the soldiers doused the barn where the Volkssturm prisoners were held with gasoline and set it on fire. 195 Germans were burned alive. Several other captured Volkssturm members were shot in the village or in nearby fields.

This was not the only crime committed against German prisoners by Red Army soldiers during the fighting for Bautzen. On the second day of the battle, a number of captured Germans (some sources report a figure of 181) were executed in the area of the cemetery and at the city's shooting range. The defenders of the Bautzen prison who had been captured were also massacred.

== Aftermath ==
The Soviets were unable to fully capture Bautzen. Lieutenant Colonel Höpke, along with about 500 soldiers, maintained their position at Ortenburg Castle, while small groups of defenders held out in isolated points throughout the city. Meanwhile, Army Group Center launched a counteroffensive, and on April 22, its forces advanced toward Bautzen. Two days later, soldiers from the 20th Panzer Division broke through to the besieged Ortenburg Castle, while Korchagin's group found itself encircled. Ultimately, the remnants of the 7th Guards Mechanized Corps and the 254th Motor Rifle Division managed to withdraw from the city and break through to positions held by the Second Polish Army; however, due to their losses, they temporarily lost their combat effectiveness.

Not all of Korchagin's soldiers managed to evacuate from Bautzen. Their fate was tragic. On April 26, after the city was retaken, the Germans massacred the captured Red Army soldiers. In the captured field hospital of the 254th Motor Rifle Division, between several hundred and over a thousand severely wounded individuals, as well as members of the medical staff, were shot.

After the war, some German authors attributed responsibility for the crime in Niederkaina to soldiers of the Second Polish Army. This view was promoted by Theodor Seidel, a German judge and writer whose father was captured and executed during the fighting for Bautzen. However, as Polish historian Leszek Kania points out, assigning responsibility to the Poles for this crime is unfounded, as the units of the Second Polish Army were fighting to the north of Bautzen at that time and did not participate in the assault on the city.

== Commemoration ==
After the reunification of Germany, the victims of the crime in Niederkaina were commemorated with a granite plaque. In April 2018, it was destroyed. Activists from the German far-left claimed responsibility for the desecration, justifying their actions by stating that supporters of the far-right had held several "memorial marches" in Niederkaina. In October of the same year, a new plaque, made of stainless steel and funded by local entrepreneurs, was unveiled at the same location.

== Bibliography ==
- Kania, Leszek (2023). Budziszyn 1945. Ostatnia kontrofensywa Wehrmachtu: fakty i mity [Bautzen 1945: The Last Counteroffensive of the Wehrmacht: Facts and Myths] (in Polish). Poznań: Pomost. ISBN 978-83-89789-60-0.
