= Battle of Bautzen (1945) =

Battle in the Eastern Front of World War II

- Part of the Eastern Front of World War II
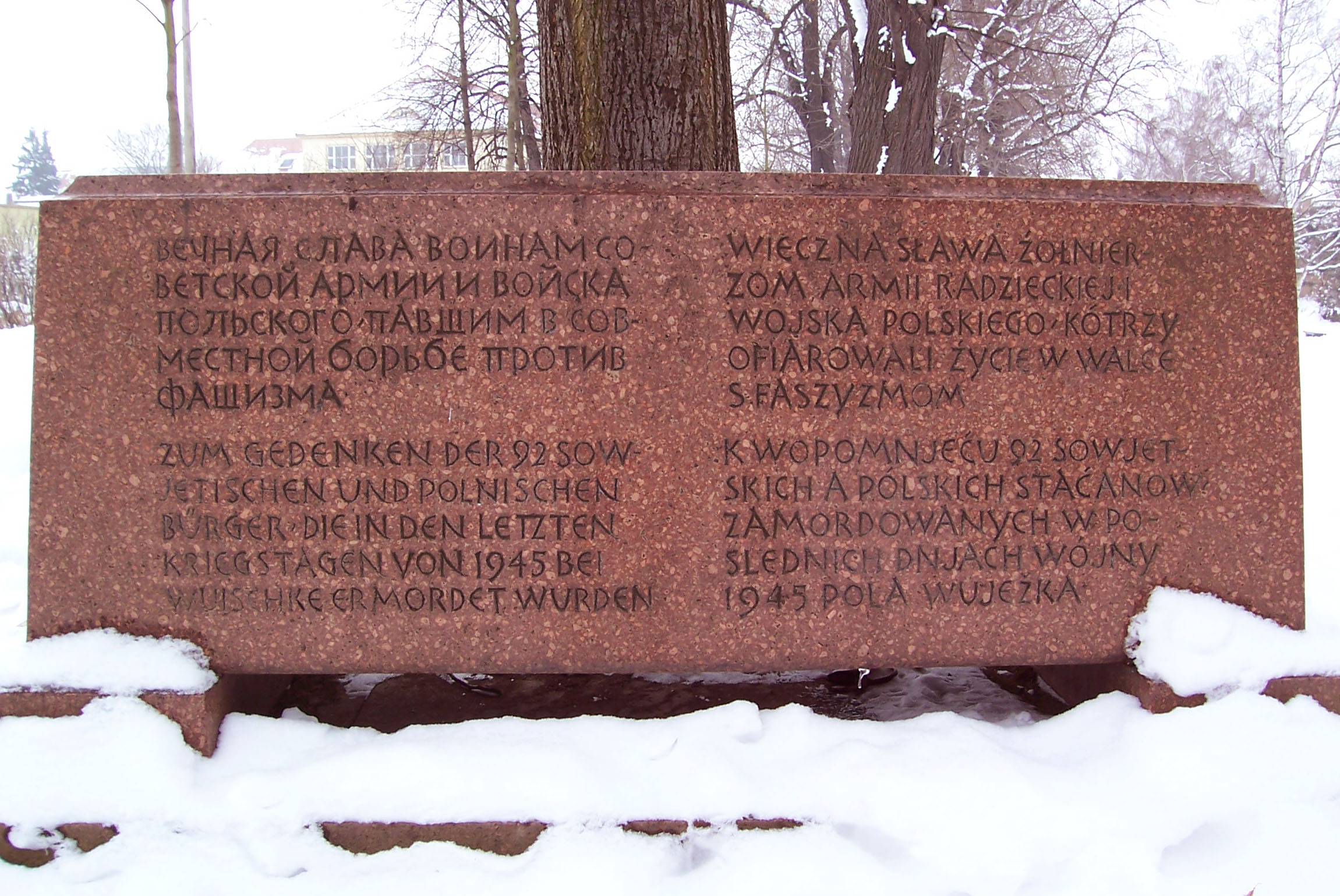
- Memorial in Bautzen to Polish and Soviet soldiers and civilians fallen near the town of Wuischke.
Date	21–30 April 1945 (9 days)
Location	Bautzen and the rural areas to the northeast, Germany
Result	German victory: The German offensive did not achieve sufficient success.

Belligerents
Germany	Soviet Union; Poland

Commanders and leaders
(Nazi Germany) Ferdinand Schörner (Nazi Germany) Wilhelm Schmalz (Nazi Germany) H. v. Oppeln-Bronikowski (Nazi Germany) Fritz-Hubert Gräser (Nazi Germany) Petro Dyachenko	(Soviet Union) Ivan Konev (Soviet Union) Vladimir Kostylev (Soviet Union) Ivan Petrov; Karol Świerczewski

Units involved
(Nazi Germany) 4th Panzer Army (Nazi Germany) 17th Army	2nd Army (Soviet Union) 5th Guards Army (Soviet Union) 52nd Army (elements)

Strength
50,000; 300 tanks 600 artillery pieces 497 armoured vehicles	Polish Army: 80,000; 500 tanks Soviet Army: at least 20,000

Casualties and losses
5,000 killed	Polish (official): 4,902 killed 10,532 injured 2,798 missing Soviet: unknown

Location of the Battle of Bautzen

The Battle of Bautzen (or Battle of Budziszyn, April 1945) was one of the last battles of the Eastern Front during World War II in Europe. It was fought on the extreme southern flank of the Spremberg-Torgau Offensive, seeing days of pitched street fighting between forces of the Polish Second Army under elements of the Soviet 52nd Army and 5th Guards Army^{[a]} on one side and elements of German Army Group Center in the form of the remnants of the 4th Panzer and 17th armies on the other.

The battle took place during Ivan Konev's 1st Ukrainian Front's push toward Berlin, which was part of the larger Soviet Berlin Offensive. The battle was fought in the town of Bautzen (Upper Sorbian: Budyšin) (Polish: Budziszyn) and the rural areas to the northeast situated primarily along the Bautzen–Niesky line. Major combat began on 21 April 1945 and continued until 26 April, although isolated engagements continued to take place until 30 April. The Polish Second Army under Karol Świerczewski suffered heavy losses, but, with the aid of Soviet reinforcements, prevented the German forces from breaking through to their rear.

After the battle both sides claimed victory and modern views as to who won the battle remain contradictory. Because the war was almost over and the battle had no strategic impact on the ongoing Battle of Berlin, German historiography has focused more on its tactical aspects. The German operation successfully recaptured Bautzen and its surroundings, which were held until the end of the war.

According to some sources, 26 April marks the end of this battle, although less severe and isolated clashes in that region continued until 30 April. Other sources note that heavy fighting still took place on 27 April, and that the German advance was only completely halted on 28 April. By the end of the month, the Polish Second Army and the Soviet forces had repelled the German attack, forming a line toward Kamenz–Doberschütz–Dauban, and was preparing to launch an offensive toward Prague.

As noted by historians such as Wawer and Komorowski, despite the heavy casualties, the Polish–Soviet frontline was not seriously breached, and thus the German offensive was a failure.

== Background ==
In the last months of World War II, the Polish Second Army, under General Karol Świerczewski, took part in the Soviet drive on Berlin. Part of Marshal Ivan Konev's 1st Ukrainian Front, the Poles operated in the centre of the front, flanked on the right by the 5th Guards Army and on the left by the 7th Mechanized Corps. Opposing these forces was the 4th Panzer Army under General Fritz-Hubert Gräser, of Field Marshal Ferdinand Schörner's Army Group Center.

On 17 April, the Polish Second Army breached German defenses on the rivers Weisser Schöps and Neisse. Their pursuit of retreating German forces toward Dresden threatened to cut off additional forces in the Muskauer Forst region. On 18 and 19 April elements of the Second Army (the 8th Infantry Division and 1st Armored Corps) engaged the Germans in the south and pushed them back while the remaining units (5th, 7th, 9th and 10th infantry divisions) drove on to Dresden, gaining bridgeheads on the River Spree north of Bautzen and destroying German forces in the Muskauer Forst. The following day Soviet units of the 7th Mechanized Corps captured parts of Bautzen and secured the line south of Niesky, taking Weißenberg and trapping several German formations.

Świerczewski decided to prioritize the taking of Dresden over securing his southern flank, deviating from the plan he was given by Konev. Meanwhile, Schörner was concentrating his units (the "Görlitz Group") in the Görlitz (Zgorzelec) and Reichenbach region, and planned to launch a counteroffensive at the southern flank of the Polish Army. His aim was to stop the 1st Front's advance and break through to Berlin to relieve the trapped 9th Army. The Germans were pinning their hopes on the idea that the Soviets might be fended off long enough for the city to be surrendered to the Western Allies. The concentration of Schörner's units went unnoticed by Soviet and Polish reconnaissance.

== Prelude ==
=== Opposing forces ===
German forces were composed of elements of the 4th Panzer Army and commanded by the headquarters for the Grossdeutschland and 57th Armored Corps. For the battle, the Germans had two armored divisions (the 20th and Hermann Göring), two mechanized divisions (the Brandenburg and Hermann Göring 2), an infantry division (the 17th) as well as an infantry division battle group (the remnants of the 545th Volksgrenadier Division). This force comprised some 50,000 soldiers, 300 tanks, and 600 guns. The supply train of the 10th SS Panzer Division was also present near Bautzen.^{[b]}

The Polish Second Army consisted of five infantry divisions: (5th, 7th, 8th, 9th and 10th, the 1st Armoured Corps, and smaller units), about 84,000–90,000 men, and 500 tanks. Many of them were new recruits inexperienced in combat, incorporated from the recently retaken Polish territories. The quality of the officer corps has also been questioned. One of the major problems facing the People's Army was the lack of a qualified cadre; a 1944 estimate showed that the army had one officer for each 1,200 soldiers. Many of the officers in the Polish Army were Soviet officers of Polish descent.

Overall, the German units were smaller than the Polish forces, their equipment more worn and supplies inferior. Polish sources describe the Germans as more experienced, however the German sources accentuate their mix of experienced soldiers and inexperienced recruits of Hitlerjugend and Volkssturm units.

== Battle ==
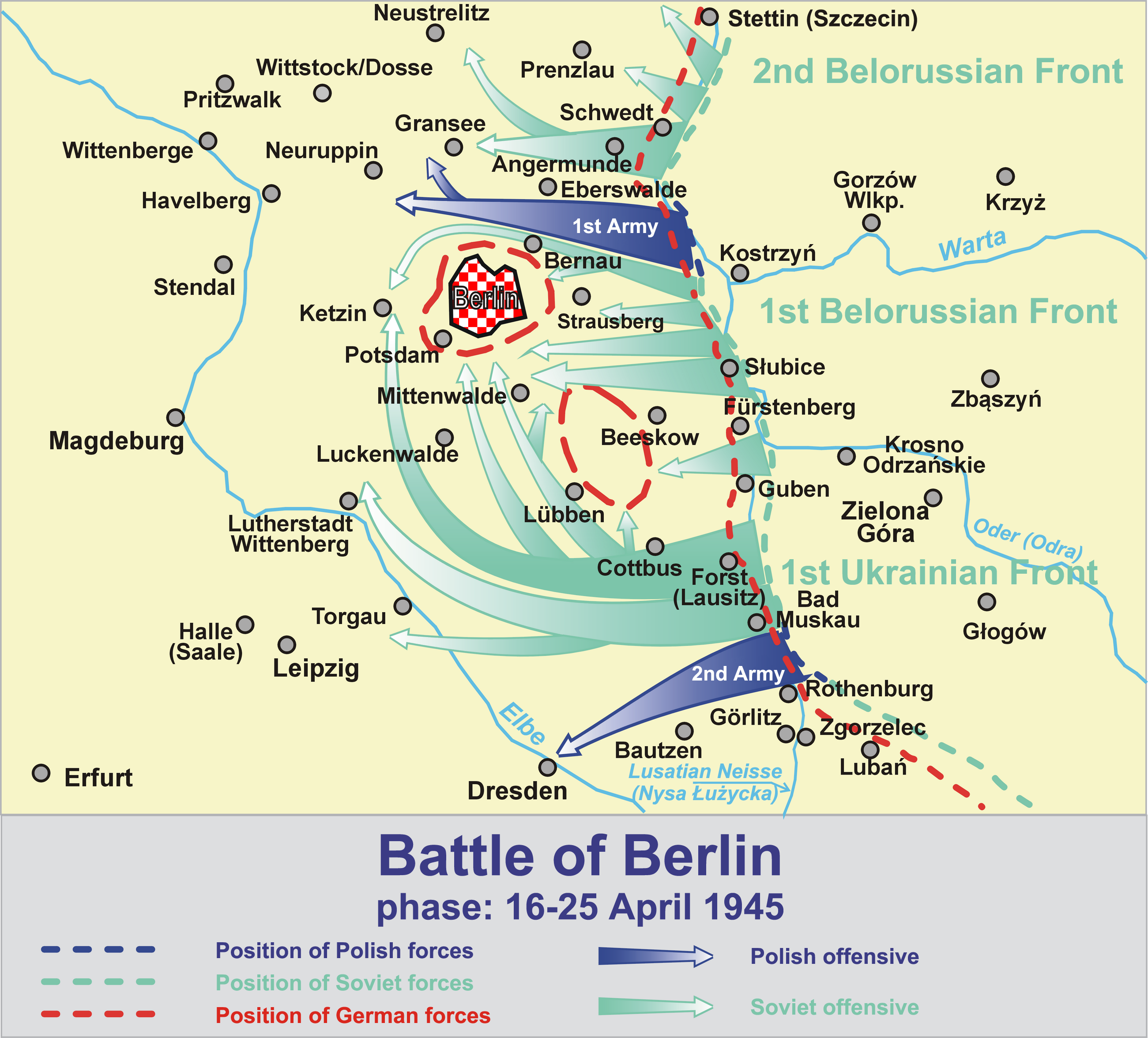
Berlin operation

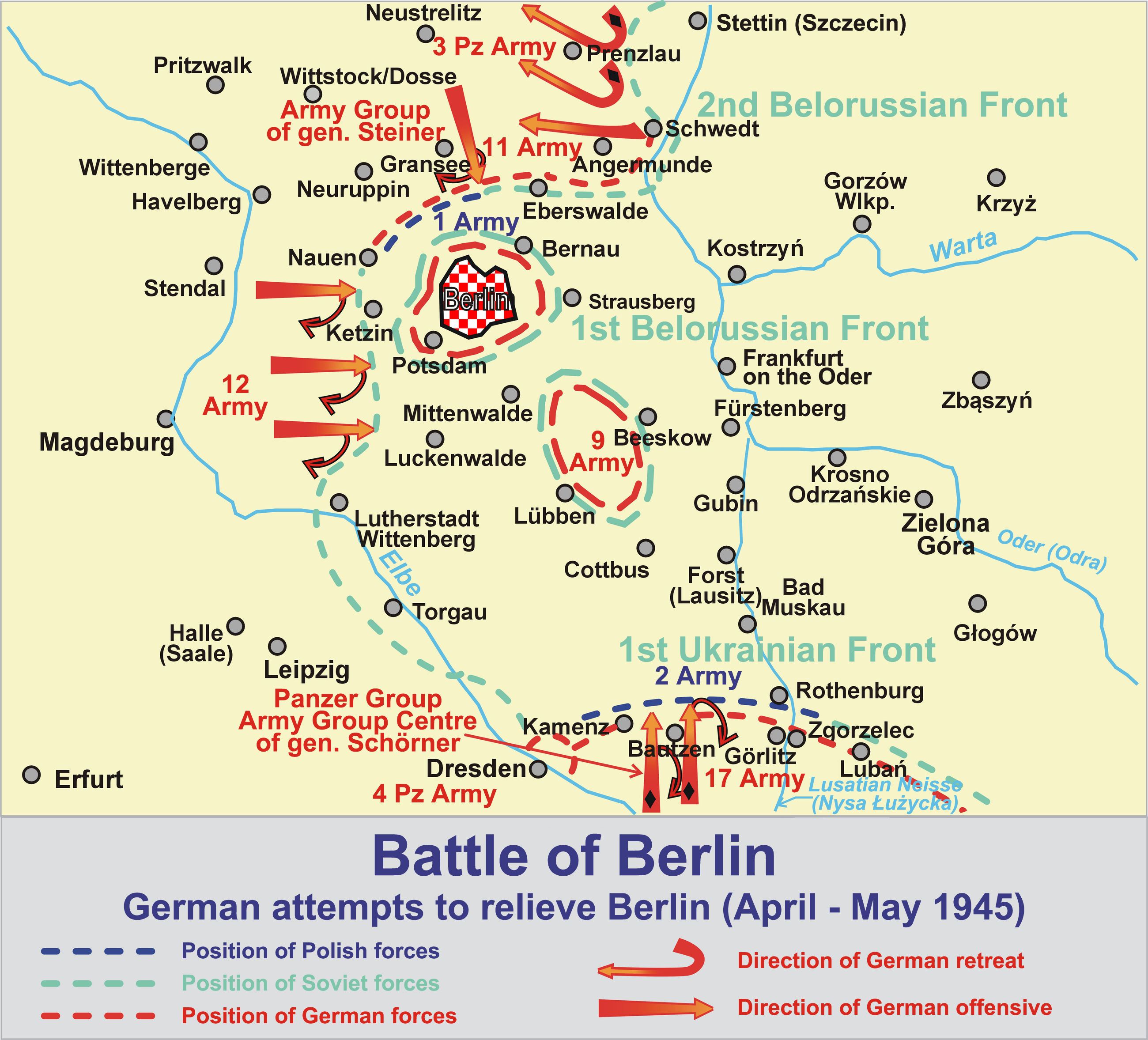
Berlin operation

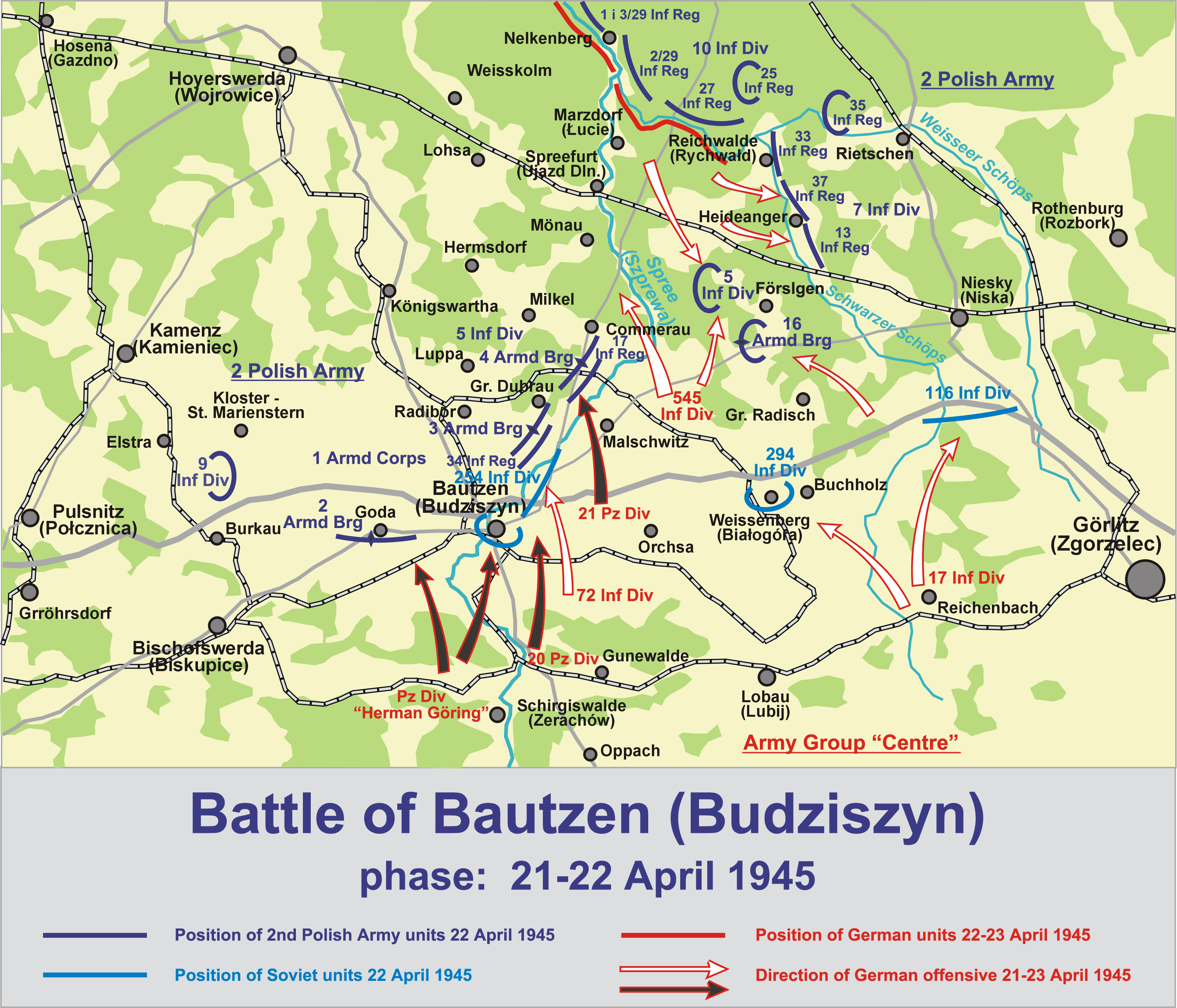
Map of the Battle of Bautzen (1)

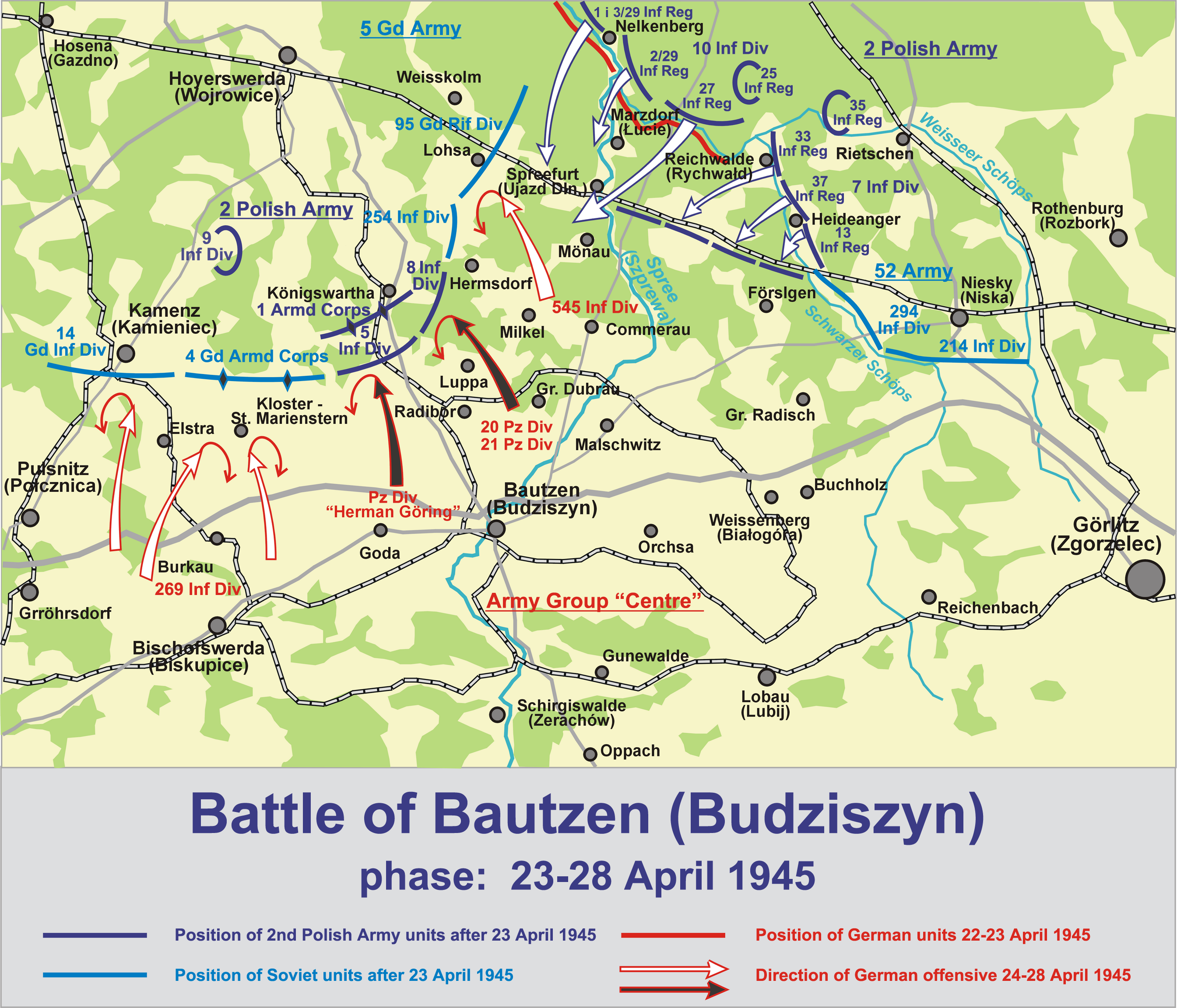
Map of the Battle of Bautzen (2)

=== Drive on Dresden ===
On 21 April, a gap had formed between the Polish infantry units (8th and 9th infantry divisions) and the 1st Armored Corps pushing towards Dresden, and the Polish units which were securing the Muskauer Forst region. The 7th and 10th infantry divisions were engaged near Neisse and the 5th Infantry Division and the 16th Tank Brigade were in transit in between those two groups. The Polish units were stretched over a line of 50 kilometers (31 mi). The Germans took the opportunity to push into this gap. The battle started on 21 April. In the west, the 20th Panzer Division started its drive on Bautzen, while in the east the 17th Infantry Division advanced on Niesky and Weißenberg, freeing trapped German troops on its way.

The Germans drove between the Polish Second Army and the Soviet 52nd Army around Bautzen, some 40 kilometers (25 mi) north-east of Dresden and 25 kilometers (16 mi) west of Görlitz, sweeping the Soviet units of the 48th Rifle Corps, and driving towards Spremberg. Major General M. K. Puteiko, commander of the 52nd Army's 254th Rifle Division of the 73rd Rifle Corps was mortally wounded around Bautzen. At first, Polish general Świerczewski continued with his attempt to take Dresden, which contributed to the growing chaos in the Polish forces, as many communication lines were cut.

The Germans succeeded in linking up with the remnants of their forces in the Muskauer Forst, and throwing the local Polish and Soviet forces into chaos. The Polish Second Army lost cohesion and split into four groups. Several units of the Polish Second Army found themselves surrounded. In particular, the Polish 5th Infantry Division and 16th Tank Brigade were struck in the rear, suffering severe losses. The headquarters of the 5th Division, defended only by sapper and training battalions, came under attack. The command group managed to break through to the 16th Tank Brigade, but that unit itself was almost annihilated at Förstgen (Forsiegen); out of 1,300 soldiers, only about 100 survived. The commanding general of the Polish 5th Infantry Division, Aleksander Waszkiewicz, was killed. In the village of Niederkaina, today a part of Bautzen, around 200 captured German members of the Volkssturm were killed by the retreating Soviet troops (the Niederkaina massacre).

By 23 April the German breakthrough reached the Schwarzer Schöps River in the east, and Lohsa, Oppitz and Grossdubrau in the west. The main body of the German force was located in the forested region around Lohsa. The Germans continued their push toward Königswartha and Hoyerswerda.

=== Polish retreat ===
Eventually, Świerczewski halted his force's advance on Dresden, and ordered it to pull back and secure the breach. On 22 April he ordered the 1st Armored Corps to retreat from Dresden and support the centre. The 8th Infantry Division was also recalled; however, the 9th remained near Dresden. For a while Świerczewski was out of communication with his superiors, including Marshal Konev. Konev also sent his chief of staff, General Ivan Yefimovich Petrov, and his chief of operations, General Vladimir Ivanovich Kostylev, to look at the situation. Petrov managed to re-establish communications, and left Kostylev in charge. Świerczewski was briefly relieved of his command for incompetence. To stabilize the situation, Konev ordered eight divisions from the Ukrainian Front to reinforce the Polish positions. The Soviet 14th and 95th Guards Rifle Divisions, as well as the 4th Guards Tank Corps, were ordered to attack toward Kamenz, Königswartha and Sdier to stop the Germans from advancing further north. The 2nd Air Army was also assigned to this theater.

Meanwhile, the German advance to the southeast of Bautzen was successful. The Soviet 294th Rifle Division was encircled at Weißenberg by the Brandenburg Division. In its subsequent breakout on 24 April, large parts of it were destroyed. At the same time at Bautzen the 20th Panzer Division was able to make contact with the trapped units in the town from the south. Major general Hermann von Oppeln-Bronikowski then lost no time and immediately ordered a German attack into Bautzen. Coordinating with the trapped troops, he was able to break into the town. A hastily assembled Polish counterattack was not successful and most of Bautzen was then recaptured by German forces after several days of bloody house-to-house combat. Several remaining pockets of resistance in the town were cleared during the next days. Outside the town the German advance stalled, as their troops were running low on fuel. The recapture of Bautzen was one of the last German tactical victories on the Eastern Front.

By 25 April, Polish units were able to stabilize a defense on the line Kamenz–Kuckau–north Bautzen–Spree–Spreewiese–Heideanger. On that day, Hitler congratulated Schörner on his "victory". The Polish 7th and 10th infantry divisions were ordered to advance toward Sdier-Heideanger. The 7th and 10th Polish infantry divisions slowly advanced, with the 10th reaching north of Spreefurt. With the Soviet units on their right flank they also secured a road to Königswartha.

The 9th Division found itself alone at the spearhead of the abandoned Polish push towards Dresden. It received orders to retreat on 26 April. Attempting to withdraw quickly and to rejoin the main forces, it was intercepted by the Germans and sustained heavy losses. The units were moving with insufficient security, on the assumption that the line of retreat was safe; at the same time the Germans captured Polish orders with details of their planned withdrawal routes. Coordination between the units was also lacking. 26th Infantry Regiment from the 9th Division took very heavy casualties (75 percent) in the "valley of death" around Panschwitz-Kuckau and Crostwitz. A Polish military hospital convoy from the same division was ambushed near Horka, with most of its personnel and wounded executed (about 300 casualties – the Horka massacre). There was only one survivor, chaplain Jan Rdzanek. The division commander, Colonel Aleksander Łaski, was taken captive. As a result of these losses, the 9th Division ceased to be an effective force; the remaining personnel were merged into the Soviet 19th Guards Rifle Division.

According to some sources, 26 April marks the end of this battle, although less severe and isolated clashes in that region continued until 30 April. Other sources note that heavy fighting still took place on 27 April, and that the German advance was only completely halted on 28 April. By the end of the month, the Polish Second Army and the Soviet forces had repelled the German attack, forming a line toward Kamenz–Doberschütz–Dauban, and were preparing to launch an offensive toward Prague.

== Aftermath ==
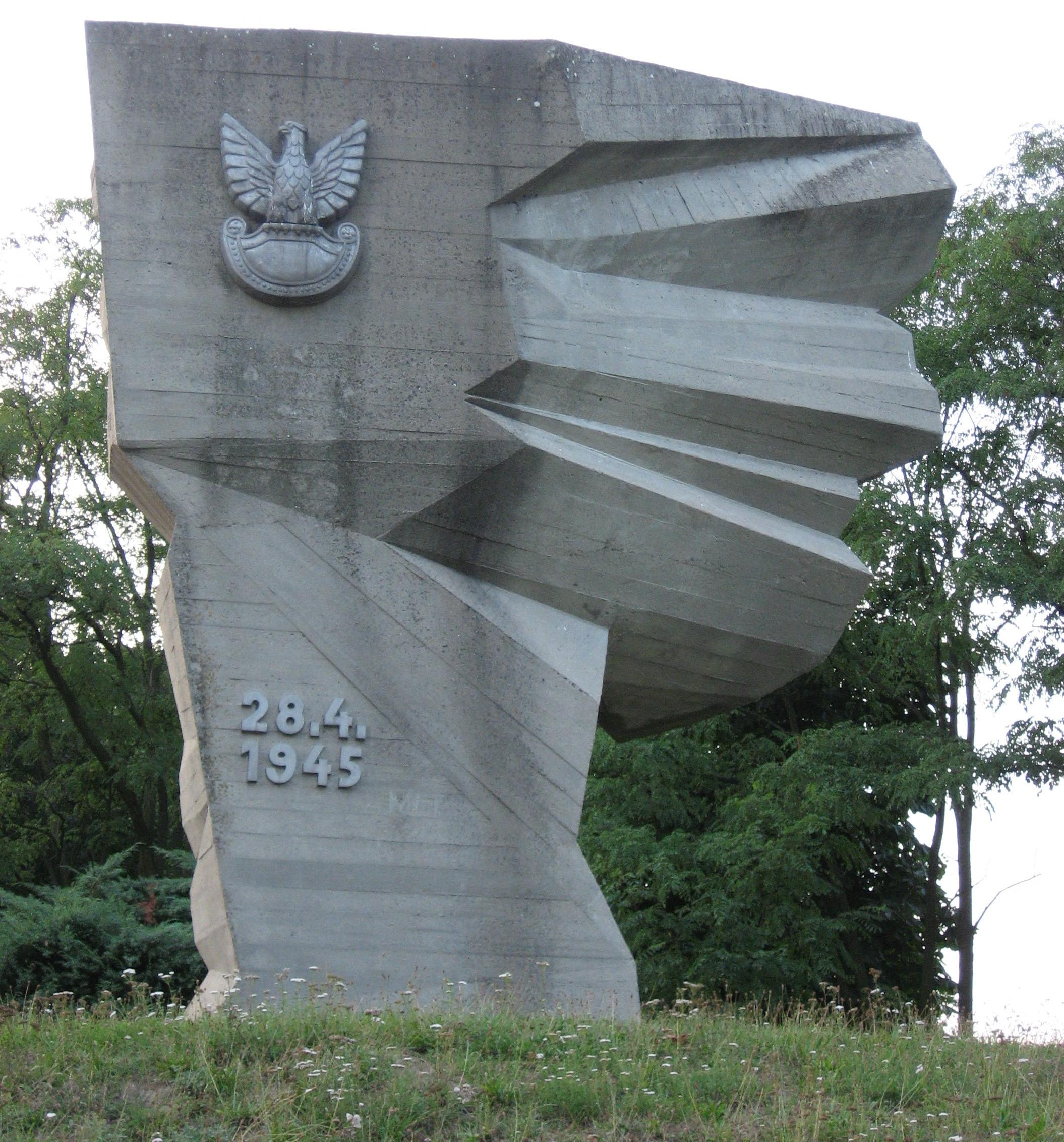
Monument to Polish soldiers in Crostwitz

Both sides suffered heavy casualties. The Polish casualties were particularly severe. In a relatively short time the Polish Second Army lost more than 22 percent of its personnel and 57 percent of its tanks and armored vehicles (about 200 total). Official estimates claimed about 18,000 casualties (including almost 5,000 dead). Some other estimates give the Polish casualties as up to 25,000. According to Polish historian Zbigniew Wawer, this was the most bloody battle that the Polish Army had been involved in since the Battle of Bzura in 1939.

German casualties were significant, but less than the Polish and Soviet ones; contemporary Polish sources estimated German losses at 6,500 personnel, which is now seen as an inflated estimate. The German forces failed in their objective of breaking through the 1st Ukrainian Front and coming to the aid of Berlin. They managed, however, to inflict very serious casualties on the local Polish and Soviet units and stopped the Polish drive on Dresden (it was still in German hands at the time of the German capitulation on 8 May).

The successful recapture of Bautzen, Weißenberg and surroundings is called one of the last successful German armored counterattacks of the war. Bautzen and surroundings stayed in German hands until Germany's capitulation. Although the battle had no strategic impact on the battle raging in Berlin, it allowed most of the participating German units as well as numerous refugees from the east to escape to the west, surrendering to the Western Allies.

== Historiography ==
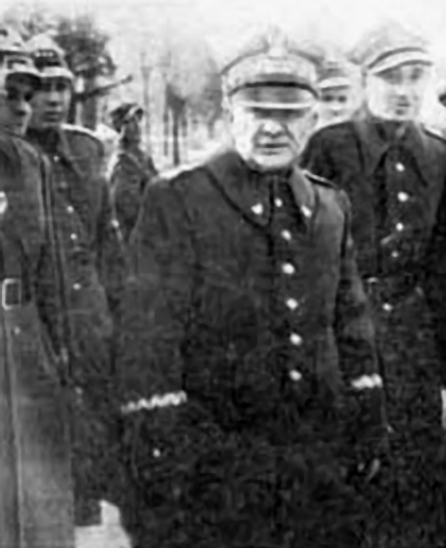
General Karol Świerczewski

Despite the heavy Polish casualties, or possibly because of them, the battle has been largely neglected in Polish historiography. During the period of the People's Republic of Poland it was portrayed merely as a difficult but victorious battle. However, since the fall of communism modern Polish historians have been much more critical of Świerczewski's command, blaming his drive on Dresden for the near destruction of the Polish force. Świerczewski's lack of competence, according to some sources, included commanding the battle while drunk. He was briefly relieved of command by Marshal Konev, but due to the backing of the Soviet high command (most likely the NKVD) he not only retained his position but all controversies were hushed up, and after the war was hailed as a hero. The actions of other Polish officers have also been questioned, such as the 9th Infantry Division commander's decision to advance without sufficient reconnaissance and escort.

In modern Poland, the battle's outcome is seen as a victory, if a very costly one, for the Polish and Soviet troops. As noted by historians such as Wawer and Komorowski, despite the heavy casualties, the Polish–Soviet frontline was not seriously breached, and thus the German offensive was a failure.

== Notes ==
a Wawer incorrectly identifies this formation as the 5th Guards Tank Army, which was near the Baltic coast at the time and subordinated to the 2nd Belorussian Front. Komornicki correctly identifies the formation as the 5th Guards Army.
b Wawer and Solak assert that the 2nd SS Panzer Division was also present in the battle. This is an incorrect assertion as the 2nd SS Division fought in Hungary and Austria from January 1945 until the end of the war. The 21st Panzer Division has also been mentioned in connection with this battle, but the 21st had already moved north as part of reinforcements provided by the 4th Panzer Army to the 9th Army. By the time the Battle of Bautzen had begun, both the 21st Panzer Division and the 10th SS Panzer Division (minus its supply train) were committed to support the 9th Army and both were encircled in the Halbe Pocket. The assessments of Polish historian Komornicki, German general von Ahlfen, and Polish historian Grzelak all support the order of battle not including the 21st and 10th SS Divisions.
