= Battle of Bautzen =

Battle of Bautzen may refer to:

- Battle of Bautzen (1813), battle between a combined Russian–Prussian army and Napoleon I of France
- Battle of Bautzen (1945), battle of the Eastern Front during World War II
