= 294th Division =

294th Division may refer to:

- 294th Infantry Division, Wehrmacht, Germany
- 294th Rifle Division, Soviet Union

== See also ==
- List of military divisions by number
