= Polish Armed Forces in the East =

Polish military forces in the USSR during WWII

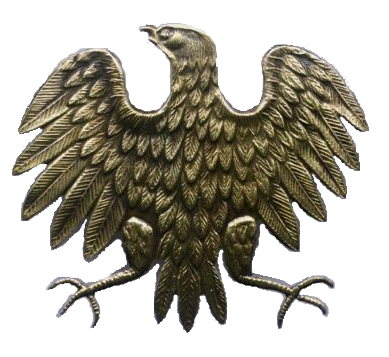
The "Piast eagle" worn by Polish Army Formations in the East, 1943–1945

The Polish Armed Forces in the East (Polish: Polskie Siły Zbrojne na Wschodzie), also called Polish Army in the USSR, were the Polish military forces established in the Soviet Union during World War II.

Two armies were formed separately and at different times. Anders' Army, created in the second half of 1941, was loyal to the Polish government-in-exile. After Operation Barbarossa and the consequent Polish-Soviet Sikorski–Mayski agreement, an amnesty for Polish citizens in the Soviet Union was declared, which made the formation of Polish military units possible. In 1942, Anders' Army was evacuated to Iran and transferred to the command of the Western Allies. It became known as the Polish II Corps and went on to fight Nazi German forces in the Italian Campaign, including the Battle of Monte Cassino.

From Poles who remained in the Soviet Union, the Polish 1st Tadeusz Kościuszko Infantry Division was formed in May 1943. It was enlarged and reorganised into the Polish First Army (Berling's Army) and the Polish Second Army. Together they constituted the Polish People's Army (Ludowe Wojsko Polskie, LWP); it fought on the Eastern Front under Soviet command all the way to the Battle of Berlin. Like other communist-led Polish institutions, the People's Army operated in opposition to the Polish government-in-exile.

After the war, the Polish People's Army became the military of communist-ruled Poland.

== Anders' Army: 1941–1942 ==
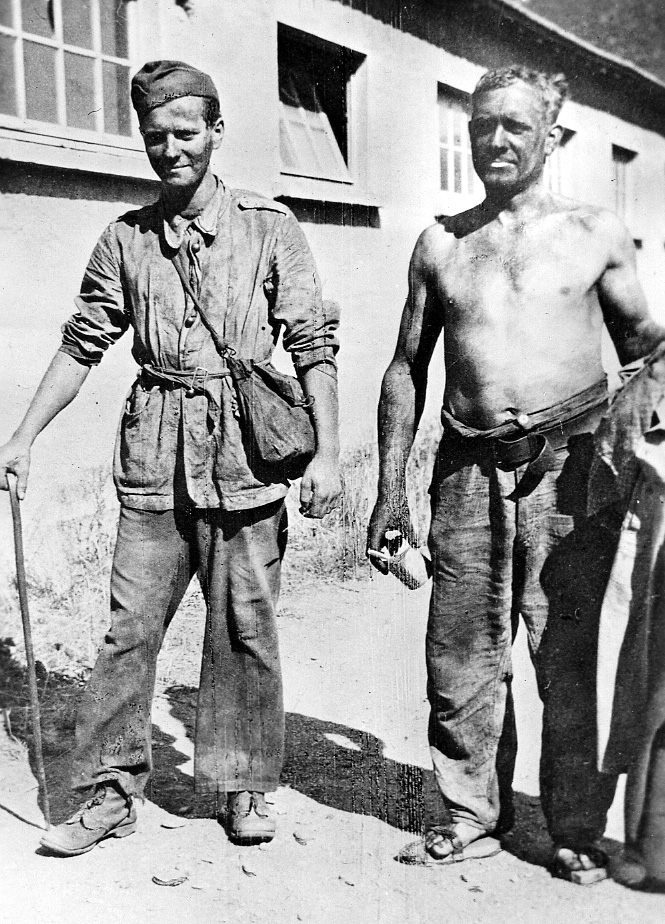
Polish volunteers to the army of Władysław Anders, released from a Soviet POW camp

At the outset of the Soviet invasion of Poland (17 September 1939), the Soviets declared that the Polish state and government—as a result of the German invasion of Poland that began on 1 September 1939—no longer existed and proclaimed any treaty or diplomatic relations between the Soviet Union and Poland invalid. Diplomatic relations were re-established in 1941 after the German invasion of the Soviet Union, when the British government allied itself with the attacked Soviet Union and pressured the Polish government to act accordingly. Consequently, the military agreement of 14 August and the Sikorski–Mayski agreement of 17 August, between the Polish government-in-exile and the Soviet government, were signed; Joseph Stalin agreed to abrogate the Poland-related aspects of the Molotov–Ribbentrop Pact. As an amnesty for Polish citizens in the Soviet Union was negotiated, tens of thousands of Polish prisoners of war held in Soviet camps, as well as hundreds of thousands of Polish citizens who had been deported to the USSR, were released.

Polish Prime Minister, General Władysław Sikorski, nominated General Władysław Anders—one of the Polish officers held captive in the Soviet Union—as commander of a new Polish army which immediately began to be formed in the USSR with the aim of fighting against the Germans alongside the Soviet Red Army.

The new formation became known as Anders' Army and started to organise in the Buzuluk area, by recruiting from NKVD camps for Polish POWs. By the end of 1941, 25,000 soldiers (including 1,000 officers) had been recruited, forming three infantry divisions: the 5th, 6th and 7th. In the spring of 1942, the force was moved to the area of Tashkent. The 8th and 9th divisions were also formed that year (divisions numbered 5 to 9 existed both within Anders' Army and Berling's First (1,2,3,4,6) and Second Armies (5,7,8,9,10).

In the second part of 1942, during the German Caucasus offensive (the most notable part of which was the Battle of Stalingrad), Stalin agreed to the transfer of the Polish formations to the Middle Eastern front. Anders' Army went via the Persian Corridor to Pahlavi, Iran. About 77,000 combatants and 41,000 civilians—Polish citizens—left the USSR. Anders' Army thus passed from Soviet control to that of the British government and joined the Polish Armed Forces in the West, forming the bulk of what would become the Polish Second Corps.

== Berling's Army: 1943–1945 ==
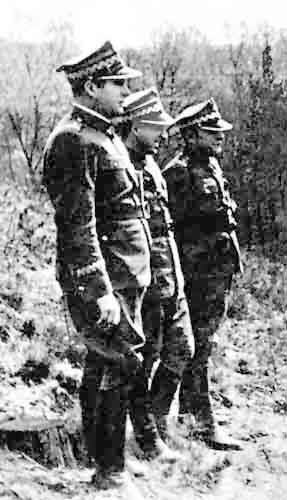
Generals Karol Świerczewski (front), Marian Spychalski and Michał Rola-Żymierski

Soldiers of the Polish Second Army in the area of the Lusatian Neisse River after fording it in April 1945

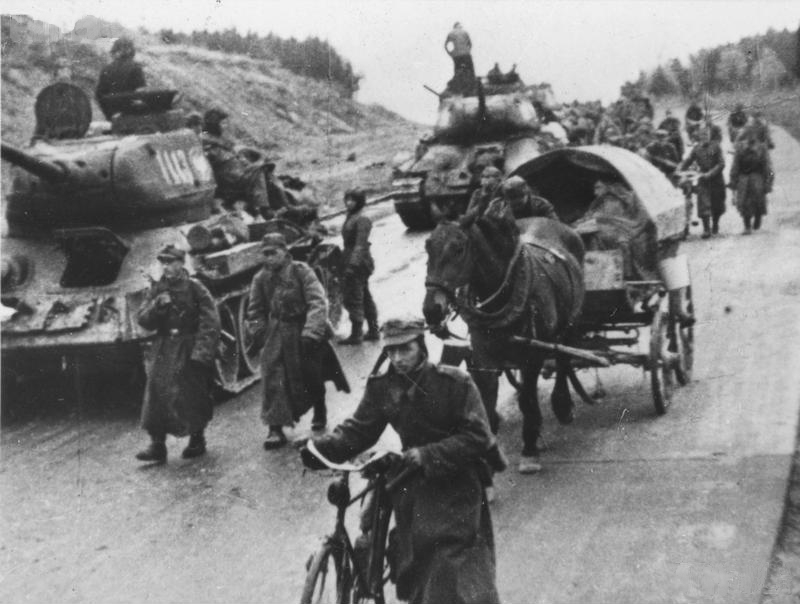
Polish Army tanks riding to Berlin in 1945.

After Anders' Army left Soviet controlled territory, the Soviet-Polish relations deteriorated and the Soviets decided to assume much greater control over the remaining Polish military potential in the USSR. Activities of organisations and people loyal to the Polish government-in-exile, particularly the Polish embassy in Moscow, were curtailed and its assets confiscated. Diplomatic relations between the Soviet Union and the Polish government were suspended by the Soviet side as news of the Katyn massacre emerged in 1943.

In June 1943, the Union of Polish Patriots (ZPP) was founded in Moscow. The ZPP was a mass-membership, communist-led organization for Polish citizens. It conducted political activities and organized large-scale social welfare and relief programs for Polish communities in the Soviet Union. The ZPP was led by the pro-Soviet Polish communist Wanda Wasilewska.

At the same time, due to the efforts of Wasilewska and Zygmunt Berling, a new army was established—the Polish People's Army (Ludowe Wojsko Polskie, LWP). Its first unit, the Polish 1st Tadeusz Kościuszko Infantry Division (1 Dywizja Piechoty im. Tadeusza Kościuszki), was created in the summer of 1943, reaching operational readiness by June/July. In August, the division was enlarged to a corps, becoming the Polish 1st Corps. It was placed under command of General Berling; other notable commanders included General Karol Świerczewski and Col. Włodzimierz Sokorski. The division with its supporting elements was sent to the Eastern Front in September 1943 and its first major engagement was the Battle of Lenino. By March 1944, the corps had been strengthened with increasing armoured and mechanical support and numbered over 30,000 soldiers. In mid-March 1944, the corps was reorganized into the First Polish Army.

Subsequent Soviet-created Polish army units on the Eastern Front included the Second (1945) and Third Polish Armies (the latter was quickly merged with the Second due to recruitment problems); the smaller formations included 10 infantry divisions (numbered from 1st to 10th) and 5 armoured brigades. Plans for a Polish Front were considered but dropped, and the Polish First Army was integrated into the 1st Belorussian Front.

These formations were led by Soviet commanders and fought under Soviet general command (the Second Army, for example, was led by the Soviet and Polish general Stanislav Poplavsky). There was a shortage of Polish officers (most were killed at Katyn or departed with Anders' Army) and in the Polish First Army and the Second Army approximately 40% of officers and engineers were Soviet. Special political officers, almost exclusively made up of Soviets, oversaw the Polish soldiers. The Soviets also created political military police, which later became the Main Directorate of Information of the Polish Army (Główny Zarząd Informacji Wojska Polskiego).

The First Army entered Poland from Soviet territory in the summer of 1944, on the right wing of the Lvov–Sandomierz Offensive, fighting in the battles during the Soviet crossing of the Vistula River around Dęblin and Puławy. In September 1944, units of the First Army were involved in heavy fighting during the latter stages of the Warsaw Uprising, after crossing the Vistula following the capture of Warsaw's eastern Praga district, but suffered heavy losses.

After eventually taking control of Warsaw in January 1945, the First Army took part in the Vistula–Oder Offensive. Subsequently, it fought in Pomerania, breaking through the Pomeranian Wall (Pommernstellung) fortified line and capturing Fortress Kolberg, a heavily fortified city, in March. In April–May 1945, the First Army took part in the Soviet invasion of Germany and the final capture of Berlin.

The Second Army reached operational readiness in January 1945. During the Soviet invasion of Germany it suffered very heavy losses at the Battle of Bautzen. Later it took part in the Prague Offensive, which was the last major Soviet operation of World War II in Europe.

== First Polish Army (Berling's Army) ==
Organization as of 1 May 1945

- 1st Infantry Division (Tadeusz Kościuszko)
- 2nd Infantry Division (Jan Henryk Dąbrowski)
- 3rd Infantry Division (Romuald Traugutt)
- 4th Infantry Division (Jan Kiliński)
- 6th Infantry Division – postwar 6th Pomeranian Air Landing Division
- 1st Armoured Brigade (Heroes of Westerplatte) – often detached and operating independently
- 1st Cavalry Brigade
- 1st Army Artillery Brigade (Józef Bem)
- 2nd Howitzer Artillery Brigade
- 3rd Army Artillery Brigade
- 5th Heavy Artillery Brigade
- 1st Anti-aircraft Artillery Division
- 4th Antitank Artillery Brigade
- 1st Sapper Brigade
- 2nd Sapper Brigade
- 1st Mortar Brigade (attached from High Command Reserve)

== Second Polish Army ==
Formations as of 1 May 1945

- Second Army Headquarters
- 5th Infantry Division (Saxonian)
- 7th Infantry Division – postwar 2nd War Mechanised Division
- 8th Infantry Division {8th Dresden Infantry Division/Wojciech Bartosz Głowacki}
- 9th Infantry Division – postwar 9th Mechanised Division.
- 10th Infantry Division – postwar 10th Armored Division
- 2nd Artillery Division
  - 6th Light Artillery Brigade
  - 7th Howitzer Artillery Brigade
  - 8th Heavy Artillery Brigade
- 3rd Anti-Aircraft Artillery Division
- 9th Antitank Brigade
- 14th Antitank Brigade
- 3rd Mortar Regiment
- 1st Tank Corps (1st Dresden Armored Corps)
- 16th Tank Brigade
- 5th Heavy Tank Regiment (IS-II)
- 28th Armoured Artillery Regiment (self-propelled guns)
- 4th Sapper Brigade

== See also ==
- Polish Armed Forces in the West
- Polish contribution to World War II
- 1st Czechoslovak Army Corps in the Soviet Union
- Polish Armed Forces (Second Polish Republic)
- Armia Ludowa
- Gwardia Ludowa
- First Polish Army (1944–1945)
- Polish People's Army
- Polish Combatants' Association (United States)
- Western betrayal
- Polish British
- Civilian Labor Group
- Sikorski's tourists
- Bataliony Chłopskie
- History of Poland (1939–1945)
- Northern Group of Forces
- Soviet invasion of Poland
- History of Poland (1945–1989)
- Soviet repressions of Polish citizens (1939–1946)
- List of World War II military equipment of Poland
