= Mikhail Puteiko =

Red Army general

Mikhail Konstantinovich Puteiko
- Born: 8 November 1913; Revkutyevichi, Minsk Governorate, Russian Empire
- Died: 21 April 1945 (aged 31)
- Allegiance: Soviet Union
- Branch: Red Army
- Service years: 1934–1945
- Rank: Major general
- Commands: 254th Rifle Division
- Conflicts: World War II (DOW)
- Awards: Order of Lenin

Mikhail Konstantinovich Puteiko (Russian: Михаил Константинович Путейко; 8 November 1913 – 21 April 1945) was a Belarusian Red Army major general killed in action during World War II.

After briefly working as a mechanic in his youth, Puteiko entered the Red Army in 1934 and graduated from an officer training school. By the beginning of Operation Barbarossa, he served with the 180th Rifle Division, with which he fought as part of the Northwestern Front until late 1941. Puteiko spent the next several months in army-level staff positions and briefly commanded a regiment of the 254th Rifle Division. After becoming chief of staff of the latter in mid-1942, he commanded the division from November 1943, leading it in the Second Jassy–Kishinev Offensive, the Sandomierz–Silesian Offensive, and the Berlin Offensive. In the final weeks of the war, Puteiko was mortally wounded during the Battle of Bautzen. At the time of his death, he was one of the youngest generals of the Red Army.

== Early life and prewar service ==
Puteiko was born on 8 November 1913 in the village of Revkutyevichi, Minsk Governorate. He worked in Minsk as a mechanic at a Belorussian Red Cross workshop and the United Belorussian Military School, and as a bicycle mechanic at the Bureau of Physical Culture of the Central Council of Trade Unions of Belorussia. Entering the Kalinin Minsk Military School (the former United Belorussian Military School) in October 1934, upon his graduation in November 1937 Puteiko remained there as a platoon commander, assistant company commander, and senior adjutant of the 2nd Cadet Battalion. In December 1940, he was transferred to the Baltic Special Military District to serve as a deputy battalion commander in the 232nd Rifle Regiment of the 180th Rifle Division, part of the 22nd Territorial Rifle Corps.

== World War II ==
When Operation Barbarossa, the German invasion of the Soviet Union, began on 22 June 1941, the division and its corps were in the rear, mobilizing near Porkhov and Dno. From the beginning of July it fought in defensive battles with the 27th and then 11th Armies of the Northwestern Front at the Pskov and Ostrov Fortified Regions, then retreated towards Novgorod. From 17 July, Puteiko, then a senior lieutenant, commanded a battalion of the 140th Rifle Regiment before temporarily serving as head of the 1st staff department of the 180th from 24 August. During July and early August, the division fought in front-level counterattacks at Soltsy and Staraya Russa.

Puteiko transferred to the staff of the 11th Army on 3 October, initially serving as assistant head of the 1st section of its operational department. He became senior assistant head of the section in January 1942. Until the end of 1941, the army defended the line of the Lovat River east of Staraya Russa, and from January fought in front operations to defeat German troops near Staraya Russa and Demyansk. Puteiko, then a captain, took command of the 936th Rifle Regiment of the 254th Rifle Division on 8 February. In April, he was appointed senior assistant head of the operational department of the staff of the 11th Army for the study of combat experience. Puteiko was appointed chief of staff of the 254th Division, holding defensive positions east of Staraya Russa, on 3 July.

Puteiko served with the division for the rest of his life, and from 26 January 1943 participated with it in the Demyansk Offensive. The 254th was withdrawn to the 34th Army reserve in March and to the Reserve of the Supreme High Command (RVGK) in May. Sent to the Voronezh Front on 25 August, it fought in offensive battles near Bogachki, Balakliia, and Khorol from 4 September. Its units reached the Dnieper on 27 September, crossed the river, and captured a bridgehead on the opposite bank. Until November it defended the bridgehead, then on 9 November withdrew to the left bank of the Dnieper for replacements. Puteiko, then a colonel, became division commander on 14 November, the same day it again crossed the Dnieper near Cherkasy, capturing the latter after fierce fighting between 21 November and 14 December. The division received the name of the city as an honorific in commemoration of its victory.

The 254th fought in the Kirovograd Offensive after being transferred to the 4th Guards Army on 4 January. During heavy fighting near Smela, Puteiko was wounded on 21 January, remaining hospitalized until April. After recovering on 9 April, he resumed his command. While he was in the hospital, his division became the first Soviet unit to cross the Prut on 10 March. The 254th fought to capture Iași until 30 May, then repulsed Axis counterattacks attempting to push it behind the Prut in early June. Withdrawn to the second echelon of the 52nd Army on 10 June, the division fought in the Second Jassy–Kishinev Offensive from 20 August, surrounding Axis troops near Iași, Kishinev, and Huși. In early September, the 254th marched to the area of Ungheni, then was withdrawn to the RVGK. Puteiko was promoted to major general on 13 September; thirty years old at the time, he was among the youngest Red Army generals during the war. Joining the 1st Ukrainian Front on 30 October, the division concentrated in the Sandomierz bridgehead at the end of December.

The 254th fought in the Sandomierz–Silesian Offensive from 12 January, capturing Chmielnik and Wieluń. Pursuing retreating German troops, it crossed the Pilica and the Polish-German border. The division fought in encirclement between 22 and 25 January, then circled north of Els and advanced to the Oder on 27 January, crossing the latter west of Kottvitz. It fought to hold the bridgehead until 10 February, and was awarded the Order of Kutuzov, 2nd class for the capture of Ostrów and Els. From 11 February, the division fought on the left flank of the army, holding the line of Haynau, Bunzlau, and Liegnitz. Between 23 February and 10 April, it fought in fierce fighting near Ober Bielau and Guntersdorf (east of Görlitz). During the Berlin Offensive, the 254th crossed the Neisse on 16 April and fought in the Battle of Bautzen from 19 April as part of the 73rd Rifle Corps of the army. On 20 April, while leading the 936th Rifle Regiment in an attack to capture Bautzen, Puteiko was mortally wounded in the chest by a sniper's bullet. Evacuated to the army hospital, he died of wounds on 21 April on the operating table and was buried in Lvov. Historian Alexander Maslov wrote that Puteiko was a "known as a steady, caring commander" during his leadership of the 254th.

== Awards and honors ==
- Order of Lenin
- Two Order of the Red Banner
- Order of Suvorov 2nd class
- Order of the Patriotic War 1st class
- Order of the Red Star
- Medal for Battle Merit
