= Aleksander Waszkiewicz =

Polish-Soviet soldier (1901–1945)

- Александр Вашкевич
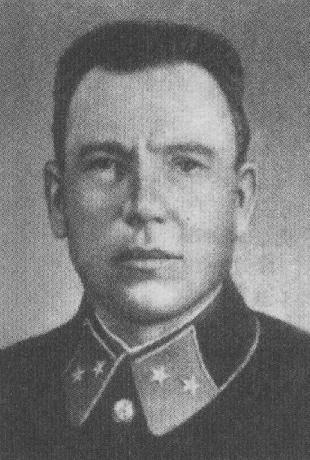
- Born: 24 August 1901; Białowieża, Russian Empire
- Died: 22 April 1945 (aged 43)
- Burial place: Powązki Military Cemetery; Warsaw, Poland
- Children: 1
- Military career
- Allegiance: Soviet Union
- Branch: Red Army (1919–1944); Polish People's Army (1944–1945)
- Service years: 1919–1945
- Rank: Major General (posthumous); Brigadier General
- Commands: 793rd Rifle Regiment
- Conflicts: Russian Civil War; Polish–Soviet War; World War II †
- Awards: Hero of the Soviet Union

Major General Aleksander Waszkiewicz (Belarusian: Аляксандр Аляксандравіч Вашкевіч, Russian: Александр Вашкевич, often transliterated as Vashkevich; 1901–1945) was a Soviet military officer of Polish descent. He served in the Red Army as commander of the 793rd Rifle Regiment during 1942–1944 and later as Deputy Commander of the 116th Rifle Division in 1944. Transferred to Polish LWP in 1944 and assigned as commander of the 5th Infantry Division of the LWP. He died in the Battle of Bautzen (1945). According to some sources, he was captured and tortured before his death.

== Early life ==
Born 24 August 1901 in Białowieża, then in the Russian Empire, Waszkiewicz received only basic education before joining the Red Army in 1919.

== Military career ==
Serving with the 27th Rifle Division, between October 1919 and April 1920 he graduated from a heavy machine gun course. During the Polish-Soviet War he managed to evade captivity following his division's destruction at Kobryn. Between 1922 and 1924 he studied at the Smolensk Military Academy and was promoted to the rank of second lieutenant.

He spent the remainder of the 1920s as an infantry platoon commanding officer in various Red Army regiments. Gradually rising through the ranks, in 1934 he was promoted to the rank of regimental chief of staff. Considered to be a promising officer, in 1938 Waszkiewicz was sent to the Moscow-based M. V. Frunze Military Academy where he served as both a student and the head of a teaching department. He graduated in 1942.

=== World War II ===
On 15 August 1942 Waszkiewicz became the commanding officer of the front-line 793rd Rifle Regiment of the 213th Rifle Division (Reformed). Between 2 and 15 February 1943 he commanded the 182nd Mountain Rifle Regiment of the 68th Mountain Rifle Division and on 22 June 1943 he became the commanding officer of the 797 Rifle Regiment of the 232nd Rifle Division (Reformed). He served in that capacity until 23 July 1944, when Waszkiewicz was promoted to the rank of Colonel and became the deputy commander of the 116th Rifle Division (Reformed).

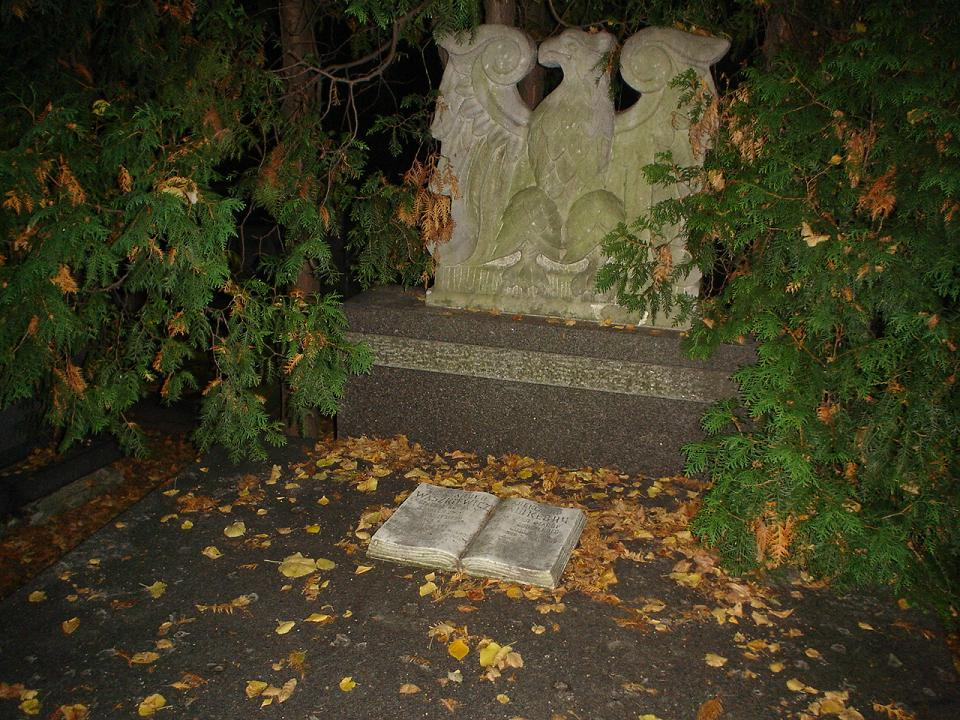
Waszkiewicz's gravestone at Powązki Military Cemetery

In September 1944 Waszkiewicz, a Soviet officer of Polish descent, was attached to the Soviet-controlled People's Army of Poland as the first commanding officer of the newly formed 5th Infantry Division. On 3 November 1944 he was promoted to the rank of generał brygady ("brigadier general") by the communist State National Council. With his 5th Division, Waszkiewicz took part in the ill-fated Lusatian Offensive and the Battle of Bautzen in April 1945. In the course of the battle the division suffered severe casualties and on 21 April 1945 its headquarters was surrounded by a German counter-attack in the village of Tauer. His corpse was discovered in a forest near Stiftswiese near Hohendubrau only on 4 May 1945. He was buried with military honours at Warsaw's Powązki Military Cemetery and promoted posthumously to the rank of Major General of the USSR.

He received the status of the Hero of the Soviet Union on 28 October 1943 for his actions during the crossing of the Dneper earlier that year. He also received the Virtuti Militari (posthumously).

== Personal life ==
Waszkiewicz and his wife Aniela had one daughter.

== Awards and honors ==
- Poland:
  - Golden Cross of the Virtuti Militari (posthumous)
  - Commander's Cross of the Order of Polonia Restituta (3 January 1945)
- Soviet Union:
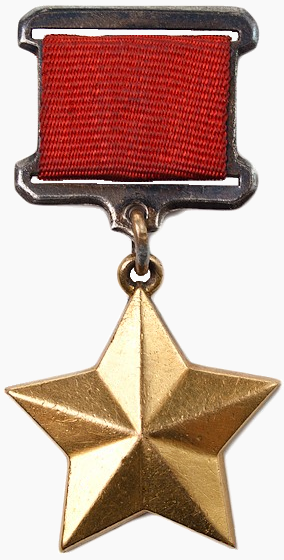
  - Hero of the Soviet Union (28 October 1943)
  - Order of Lenin (28 October 1943)
  - Order of the Red Banner, twice (26 July 1943, 3 November 1944)
  - Order of the Patriotic War, 1st class (9 June 1945, posthumous)
  - Medal "For the Defence of Moscow" (1944)
  - Jubilee Medal "XX Years of the Workers' and Peasants' Red Army" (1938)

=== Other honors ===
Primary and secondary schools Gubin, Nowa Sól, Wrocław, Łuków and Głowno were named after him. Streets in Zielona Góra, Międzyrzecz and Białowieża were also named after him until 2017 when they were reverted back to their original names.
