= 254th Motor Rifle Division =

Motor rifle division of the Soviet military

254th Motor Rifle Division (1965–1992) 27th Motor Rifle Division (1957–1965) 27th Mechanized Division (1946–1957) 254th Rifle Division (1941–1946)
- Active: 1941–1992
- Country: Soviet Union
- Branch: Red Army (1941-1946); Soviet Army (1946-1991); Russian Ground Forces (1991-1992)
- Type: Infantry/Motorized Infantry
- Engagements: World War II 1956 Hungarian Revolution Operation Danube
- Decorations: Order of Lenin Order of the Red Banner; Order of Suvorov; Order of Kutuzov Order of Bogdan Khmelnitsky
- Battle honours: Cherkassy

Commanders
- Notable commanders: Pyotr Pokhaznikov; Pavel Batitsky; Mikhail Puteiko

The 254th Motor Rifle Division was a motorized infantry division of the Soviet Army during the Cold War and later the Ukrainian Army. It was formed in June 1941 from NKVD Border Troops and reservists as part of the Northwestern Front and fought against the German invasion of Russia. In 1944 the division was the first Soviet unit to enter Romanian territory and in 1945 fought in the Battle of Bautzen. The division, briefly renumbered as the 27th Mechanized Division, was part of the Soviet forces that put down the Hungarian Revolution of 1956 and was afterwards stationed in Hungary. The unit participated in the 1968 Warsaw Pact invasion of Czechoslovakia, after which it returned to Hungary.

The unit was withdrawn to Ukraine in 1990 and after the dissolution of the Soviet Union was transferred to Ukraine. The unit was downsized to form the 52nd Separate Mechanized Brigade (52-ha okrema mekhanizovana bryhada) and was disbanded in October 2004.

== Formation ==
The division was formed beginning 26 June 1941 in the Moscow Military District in the Tetnitsky camps 25 kilometers north of Tula. It was one of fifteen divisions in the 240-250 series formed on cadres of 1,500 officers and men from the NKVD Border Troops; most of the remaining personnel of the division were reservists. The order of battle of the 254th was as follows:

- 929th Rifle Regiment
- 933rd Rifle Regiment
- 936th Rifle Regiment
- 791st Artillery Regiment
- 130th Antitank Battalion (later 311th)
- 421st Sapper Battalion
- 673rd Signal Battalion (later 455th Signal Company)
- 333rd Reconnaissance Company

It was commanded by Major General Pyotr Pokhaznikov from its formation until 15 October. The division was fully formed by 12 July and on that day was loaded into trains despite not yet being armed and sent to the Staraya Russa area, assigned to the 11th Army in the Northwestern Front. On 15 July the unloading had been completed.

== Staraya Russa ==
On 16 July, the division received orders to reach the line of Evanovo, Tuleblya, Zabolote, Vnuchkovo, Utoshkino, and Nogatkino. The line was 8 to 10 kilometers to the west, southwest, and south of Staraya Russa. The division was to fortify the line to prevent a German breakthrough to the east. On the left flank of the line there were forests and swamps, but the line's right flank was open. The division immediately began building fortifications, creating strongpoints in the area of settlements. The 15 kilometer length of the line did not allow for a second echelon of the division.

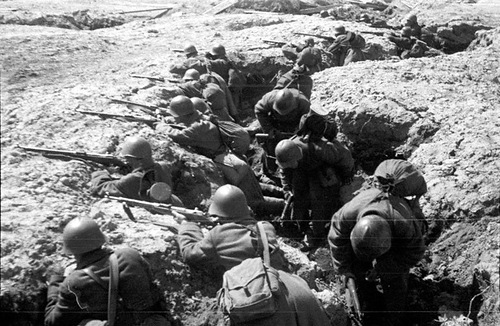
Soviet soldiers near Staraya Russa in summer 1941

On 22 July, the division became part of the 11th Army, ordered to cover the army's retreat and stop the German attack. By 28 July, the 180th Rifle Division had advanced to the northwest of Staraya Russa and was defending on the right of the 254th. The German 290th Infantry Division advanced along the highway towards Tuleblya, on the 254th's right flank. At this time the 254th still did not have guns for the regimental artillery and half of its assigned machine guns. The division's fire system was not ready to repel the advance of the 290th Infantry Division. As a result, the 202nd Motorized Division marched 70 kilometers to the Tuleblya area, a position from which it could counterattack the 290th. On 28 July the 202nd Division began its attack and held the German advance for two days. This was enough time to fully arm the 254th and enable it to repel the German attacks. On 30 July, the forward units of the division's defenses were attacked by the 290th, which although it had suffered losses, was still twice the size of the 254th. For five days the 254th resisted the advance of the German forces.

The 290th and the reserve 30th Infantry Division then shifted their attacks to the 180th Rifle Division on 4 August. Suffering heavy losses, the 30th Infantry Division broke through and captured the southern part of Staraya Russa. The 30th attacked southwards, towards the rear of the 254th, cutting off its supply and evacuation routes. The 254th now had to fight on two fronts at once: the 290th still attacking from the west, and parts of the 30th from the northeast. The situation threatened the division with encirclement, and on 6 August it was ordered to pull back to the eastern bank of the Lovat River. The division retreated 13 to 17 kilometers and finished on a seven kilometer long line near Pleshakovo and Prismorzhye.

On 6 August it was reassigned to 34th Army in the same front, but this was temporary, and it was soon back in 11th Army.

The 11th and 34th Armies counterattacked south of Lake Ilmen on 12 August. Advancing more than twenty kilometers, the division captured the southern outskirts of Staraya Russa and reached the line of the Polist River by 18 August. However, German counterattacks drove the two armies back to the Lovat, and the 254th reoccupied its former positions there. To its north was the 22nd Rifle Corps, and in the south there was a gap of twelve kilometers between the nearest Soviet unit. On 24 August the German 3rd SS Panzer Division Totenkopf attacked through the gap towards the 254th's left flank and rear. The 254th withdrew northeast of the Pola River, where by 31 August it hurriedly took up defensive positions at Zaostrovye and Vystova, on a twelve kilometer front. At this time, German troops broke through the defenses of the divisions on the flanks of the 254th and it was forced to retreat five to eight kilometers southeast. The division took a line northwest of Pozhaleyevo and west of Nora and Pustynya.

The 202nd Rifle Division (the former 202nd Motorized Division) defended on the right of the division, and the 163rd Rifle Division on its left.

== First Jassy-Kishinev Offensive ==
In April, 1944, the 254th was the first Red Army unit to cross the Prut River and enter Romanian territory. Despite the accumulated losses of the past month's campaigning and the difficulties of supply during winter, the Front's obvious next objectives were the cities of Jassy and Kishinev. On 13 April, Gen. I.S. Konev ordered Lt. Gen. K.A. Koroteev to probe the defenses of German IV Corps north of Jassy. He, in turn, ordered Mjr. Gen. Batitsky, who now commanded 73rd Rifle Corps, to organize an assault with the 254th and 294th Rifle Divisions, backed by a handful of tanks from 6th Tank Army. These defenses were held by a 4-battalion battlegroup of the 24th Panzer Division, on a sector anchored on the village strongpoint of Vulturi, 10 km due north of Jassy. The fighting continued for two full days, and despite reinforcements from 116th Rifle Division, the attack made no progress and was shut down.

By the end of May, the front on this sector had been stagnant for more than six weeks. 52nd Army had its three rifle corps spread on a 40 km frontage east of the Prut as far as the village of Horlesti. The 254th was directly under army command as its second echelon. Meanwhile, the Axis forces were preparing a further effort to drive the Soviets back from the approaches to Jassy. Called Operation "Sonja", it was launched on 30 May by Group Mieth (IV Corps), with three panzer divisions, backed by German 79th Infantry and Romanian 11th Infantry Divisions. The attack found the boundary between 294th and 373rd Rifle Divisions and drove northwest about 8 km towards the Jijia River and the town of Cirpiti, capturing the village of Stanka by 2000 hours. The 254th was ordered from its reserve positions to reinforce the shattered defenses of the 373rd, and it also offered effective resistance to the German 79th Infantry throughout the day. On the second day the Red Army forces had regained their balance and held their ground, again with armored assistance from 6th Tank. After regrouping on 1 June, the 254th was preparing to help lead a counterattack to retake Stanka on the 2nd when news came of yet another Axis attack some distance to the west, which the Germans called Operation "Katja". All efforts over the next few days were needed to shore up the defenses, and it became clear that any further Soviet offensive efforts were going to require time to prepare.

== Battle of Bautzen ==
The division, supported by the 26th Guards Mechanized Brigade of the 7th Guards Mechanized Corps, fought in heavy fighting in the Battle of Bautzen. During the battle division commander Major general Mikhail Puteiko, one of the Red Army's youngest general officers, having been promoted to this rank in 1944 at the age of 31, was severely wounded. He died on 21 April.

When the fighting was finished, the men and women of the division shared the honorific title of 254th Rifle, Cherkassy, Order of Lenin, Order of the Red Banner, Orders of Suvorov, Kutusov, and Bogdan Khmelnitsky Division (Russian: 254-я стрелковая Черкасская ордена Ленина Краснознамённая орденов Суворова, Кутузова и Богдана Хмельницкого дивизия), and no fewer than 56 of its personnel had been decorated as Heroes of the Soviet Union.

== Postwar ==
In the summer of 1945, the division was withdrawn to Stryi as part of the 73rd Rifle Corps of the 52nd Army. On 25 July 1946, the 254th Rifle Division became the 27th Mechanized Division. After 52nd Army was used to form the 8th Tank Army, the division and its corps were transferred to the 13th Army. The division became part of the 38th Army for Operation Whirlwind, the suppression of the 1956 Hungarian Revolution. The division's 97th Mechanized Regiment reinforced the Special Corps, fighting in Budapest. The division and other troops from the 38th Army covered the right bank of the Danube on the Austrian and Yugoslavian borders. After the end of Operation Whirlwind, the division became part of the new Southern Group of Forces in Hungary. The division was located at Székesfehérvár. On 20 April 1957, the division became the 27th Motor Rifle Division. On 11 January 1965, the division was renumbered the 254th Motor Rifle Division, restoring its World War II designation.

In 1968, the division participated in Operation Danube, attached to the Carpathian Front. By the late 1980s, the division included the 5th Guards Motor Rifle Regiment at Kiskunmajsa, the 78th Guards Motor Rifle Regiment at Pápa, the 95th Motor Rifle and 66th Tank Regiments at Hajmáskér, the 297th Self-Propelled Artillery Regiment at Fertőd, and the 1092nd Anti-Aircraft Rocket Regiment at Székesfehérvár. In January 1990, the division was withdrawn to Artemivsk and became part of the Kiev Military District. It replaced the recently disbanded 36th Motor Rifle Division there.

== Ukrainian Ground Forces ==
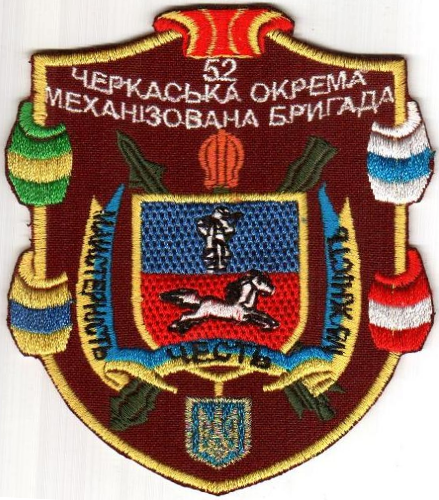
Shoulder Sleeve Insignia of the 52nd Brigade

After the Dissolution of the Soviet Union, the division became part of the Ukrainian Ground Forces. In February 1992, Colonel (promoted to Major General) Viktor Kovalov commanded the division. Between 1992 and 1993 it became the 254th Mechanized Division. In December 1993 Colonel (promoted to Major General) Volodymyr Polyvody commanded the division. In August 1997 Colonel (promoted to Major General) Anatoliy Sobory commanded the division. On 1 January 2001 the division included the 78th and 561st Mechanized Regiments, the 425th Self-Propelled Artillery Regiment, the 1215th Anti-Aircraft Rocket Regiment, and smaller units.

It was downsized into the 52nd Separate Mechanized Brigade and became part of the 6th Army Corps. In March 2003, a stray 7.62mm round fired by a soldier of the brigade from a machine gun injured a local welder. At this time the brigade commander was Colonel Oleksandr Shinkarenko. On 10 October 2003, a spark from a nearby unauthorized welder started a fire which destroyed ten of seventeen ammunition storage warehouses. The explosions resulted in the evacuation of 1,500 residents of Artemivsk. The brigade command was also reported to have illegally contracted several companies for services and made a 435,000 Hryvnia profit. The brigade was disbanded in October 2004, and its battle flag given to a museum.
