= 52nd Army (Soviet Union) =

WW2 Soviet Red Army formation

- 52-я армия
- Active: 1941 (1st Formation); 1941–1946 (2nd Formation)
- Country: Soviet Union
- Branch: Red Army / Soviet Army
- Size: Field army
- Engagements: World War II; Leningrad Strategic Defensive; Lyuban Offensive Operation; Battle of the Dnieper; Dnieper-Carpathian Offensive; Second Jassy–Kishinev Offensive; Vistula-Oder Offensive; Lower Silesian Offensive; Berlin Offensive; Prague Offensive

Commanders
- Notable commanders: Konstantin Koroteev

The 52nd Army (Russian: 52-я армия) was a field army of the Red Army of the Soviet Union in World War II, formed twice.

== History ==
It was created on 25 August 1941 from the headquarters of the 25th Rifle Corps and defended north of Novgorod. On 26 September 1941, the 52nd Army headquarters was used to form the 4th Army (II Formation). The 52nd Army headquarters was reestablished on 28 September 1941. In May 1943, the army was moved to control of the Reserve of the Supreme High Command (Stavka Reserve). Stavka released the 52nd Army to subordination of the Steppe Front in July 1943, and the 52nd Army thereafter fought in Ukraine, southern Poland, southeastern Germany, and finally in northern Czechoslovakia.

The army took part in the following operations:

1941

Tikhvin Defensive Operation

1942

Tikhvin Offensive
Lyuban Offensive Operation

1943

Chernigov-Poltava Offensive
Cherkassy Offensive

1944

Kirovograd Offensive
Korsun–Shevchenkovsky Offensive
Uman–Botoșani Offensive

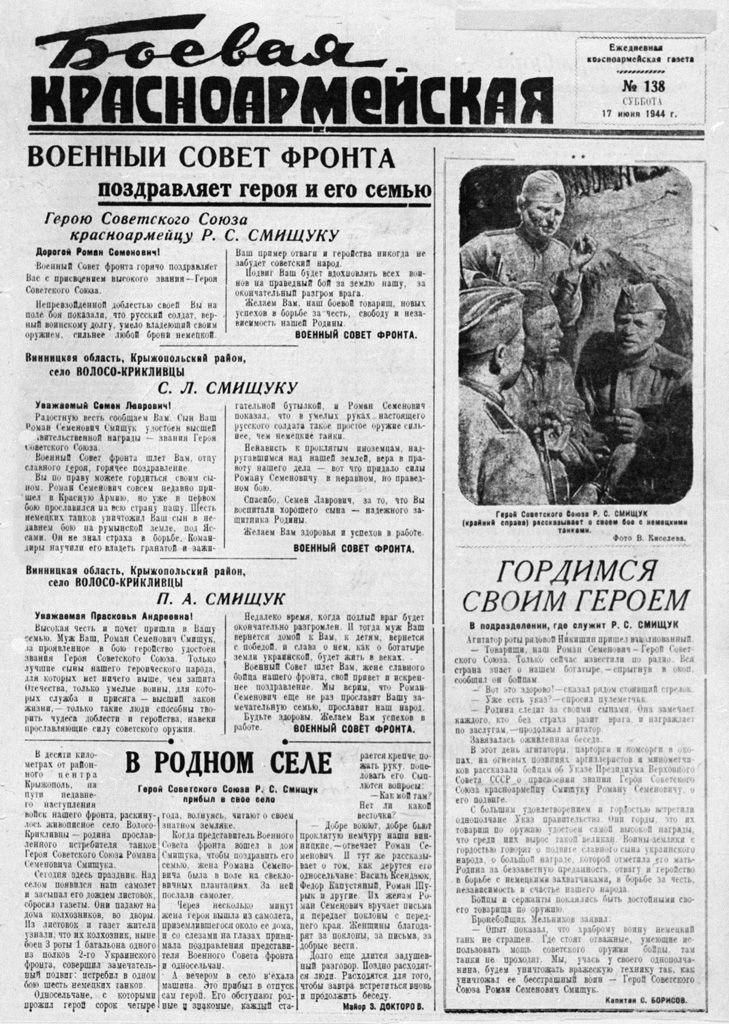
Front cover of the 52nd Army newspaper issue of 17 June 1944

Second Jassy–Kishinev Offensive

1945

Sandomierz–Silesian Offensive
Lower Silesian Offensive
Berlin Offensive, (including the Battle of Bautzen)
Prague Offensive

On 3 April 1945 the 52nd Army comprised the 7th Guards Mechanised Corps, the 48th Rifle Corps (116th and 294th Rifle Divisions), the 73rd Rifle Corps (50th, 111th and 254th Rifle Divisions) and the 78th Rifle Corps (31st, 214th and 373rd Rifle Divisions), the 213th Rifle Division, the 214th Tank Regiment, two artillery units, and service units.

At the beginning of the Battle of Bautzen, on April 21, 1945, the Germans drove in between the Polish 2nd Army and the 52nd Army around Bautzen, some 40 kilometers (25 mi) north-east of Dresden and 25 kilometers (16 mi) west of Görlitz, sweeping the Soviet units of the 48th Rifle Corps, and driving towards Spremberg. Major General M. K. Puteiko, commander of the 52nd Army's 254th Rifle Division of the 73rd Rifle Corps was mortally wounded around Bautzen. Subsequently, the 52nd Army took part in the advance on Prague with the 1st Ukrainian Front.

Postwar, the army was moved to Poland with its headquarters in Kraków. It soon moved to western Ukraine, with its headquarters at Drohobych. On 12 June 1946 the army was converted into the 8th Tank Army and its headquarters moved to Zhytomyr. The 48th and 78th Rifle Corps were disbanded, along with the 31st, 111th, 116th, 213th, 214th, and 373rd Rifle Divisions. The 73rd Rifle Corps was transferred to the 13th Army.

== Commanders ==
The army was commanded by the following generals.

- Aug 1941 to Jan 1942 - Nikolai Klykov
- Jan 1942 to Jul 1943 - Vsevolod Yakovlev
- Jul 1943 to June 1946 - Konstantin Koroteev
