= Second Polish Army (1944–1945) =

Polish 2nd Army (Druga Armia)
- Active: Aug 1944 – Aug 1945
- Country: Poland
- Allegiance: People's Army of Poland
- Type: Field Army
- Engagements: Bautzen

Commanders
- Notable commanders: Karol Świerczewski; Stanislav Poplavsky; Florian Siwicki

The Polish Second Army (Polish: Druga Armia Wojska Polskiego, 2. AWP for short) was a Polish Army unit formed in the Soviet Union in 1944 as part of the People's Army of Poland. The organization began in August under the command of generals Karol Świerczewski and Stanislav Poplavsky, and the formation under command of general Świerczewski entered active duty in January 1945. The Second Army suffered heavy losses at the Battle of Bautzen during April 22–26, 1945. Subsequently, the Second Army was part of the final great Soviet offensive of World War II in Europe, the drive on Prague. In August 1945 most of the formation was used to create the Poznań Military District.

== Operational history ==
=== Formation (8 August – 31 December 1944) ===
In 1944, with the Soviet advance now enveloping increasing number of territories of the Second Polish Republic, occupied by Nazi Germany for the past several years, the Soviet high command saw the opportunity to recruit more Poles into the Soviet-controlled People's Army of Poland. The first plans called for the formation of Polish Second Army and Polish Third Army, which were to be joined with the Polish First Army into a Polish Front (at that time the Polish forces were part of the 1st Belorussian Front). The early plans called for the Second Army to be ready for combat by the end of September.

However soon it became apparent that this plan was flawed, as there were not enough recruits to fill the ranks of officers. A significant number of pre-war Polish NCOs and officers either:

- were held in the Germans officer POW camps
- already joined the Polish First Army
- had joined the Polish Army in the West
- were part of the Armia Krajowa Polish resistance, loyal to the Polish government in exile and seen by Soviets as enemies (the 2nd Army military tribunal and police were actually actively engaged in actions against the AK elements, arresting thousands of people and sentencing hundreds to death)
- or had been executed by the Soviets following their Soviet invasion of Poland in 1939 in massacres such as the infamous Katyn massacre, when the Soviets were more concerned with breaking the Polish intelligentsia than forming Polish allied forces

Thus while the recruits to the pro-Soviet Polish Committee of National Liberation were able to fill most private and NCOs slots, the army had only about half of the needed number of officers; 33% of them young (under 25 years) and about 50% with no formal training (only secondary education). Although the Soviets always tried to control such allied formations by transferring a significant number of Soviet officers to those units, they found themselves having to fill about 50% of the officer positions in the Second Army (for several months in 1944, the commander of the Army was in the hands of the Soviet general, Stanislav Poplavsky). The situation of the Third Army was even direr, which eventually led to the cancellation of plans for both the creation of the Third Army and the Polish Front.

The Second Army reached operational level at the beginning of January 1945.

=== Combat (January–May 1945) ===
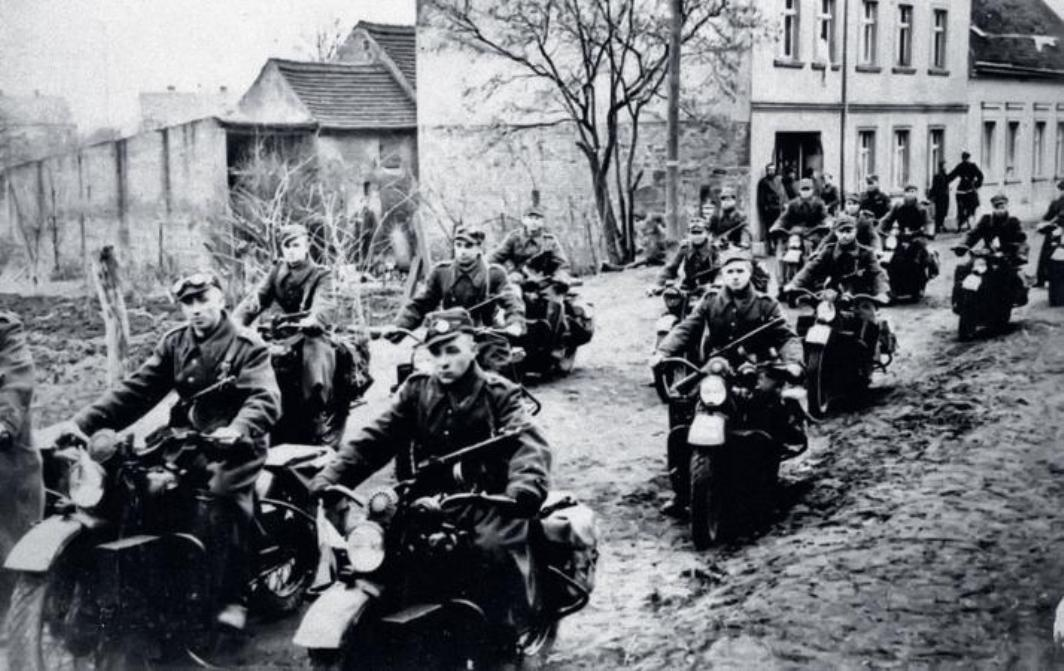
Motorcyclists of the 2nd Polish Army during the Lusatian operation, April 1945

While some formations of the Second Army were engaged in combat as parts of the 1st Belarusian Front in January, most of the Army was regrouped in early February near Kutno, Łódź, Łask and Piotrków Trybunalski. Near the end of February, the Army moved towards Piła, Krzyż Wielkopolski and Czarnków to counter the possible threat of German counterattack from the Poznań area. In the first half of March the army acted as a reinforcement for the 1st Belarusian Front, and was regrouped in the area of Gorzów Wielkopolski - Barlinek - Pełczyce - Chłopowo - Klasztorne - Słonów. In the second half of March, the Army was transferred to the 1st Ukrainian Front, and regrouped north of Wrocław on the line Brzeg Dolny - Trzebnica - Oleśnica in order to prevent any attempt to escape German troops from besieged Wrocław. With the preparations to the battle of Berlin, the Army took positions near the Lusatian Neisse (Nysa Łuzycka) on 10–11 April.

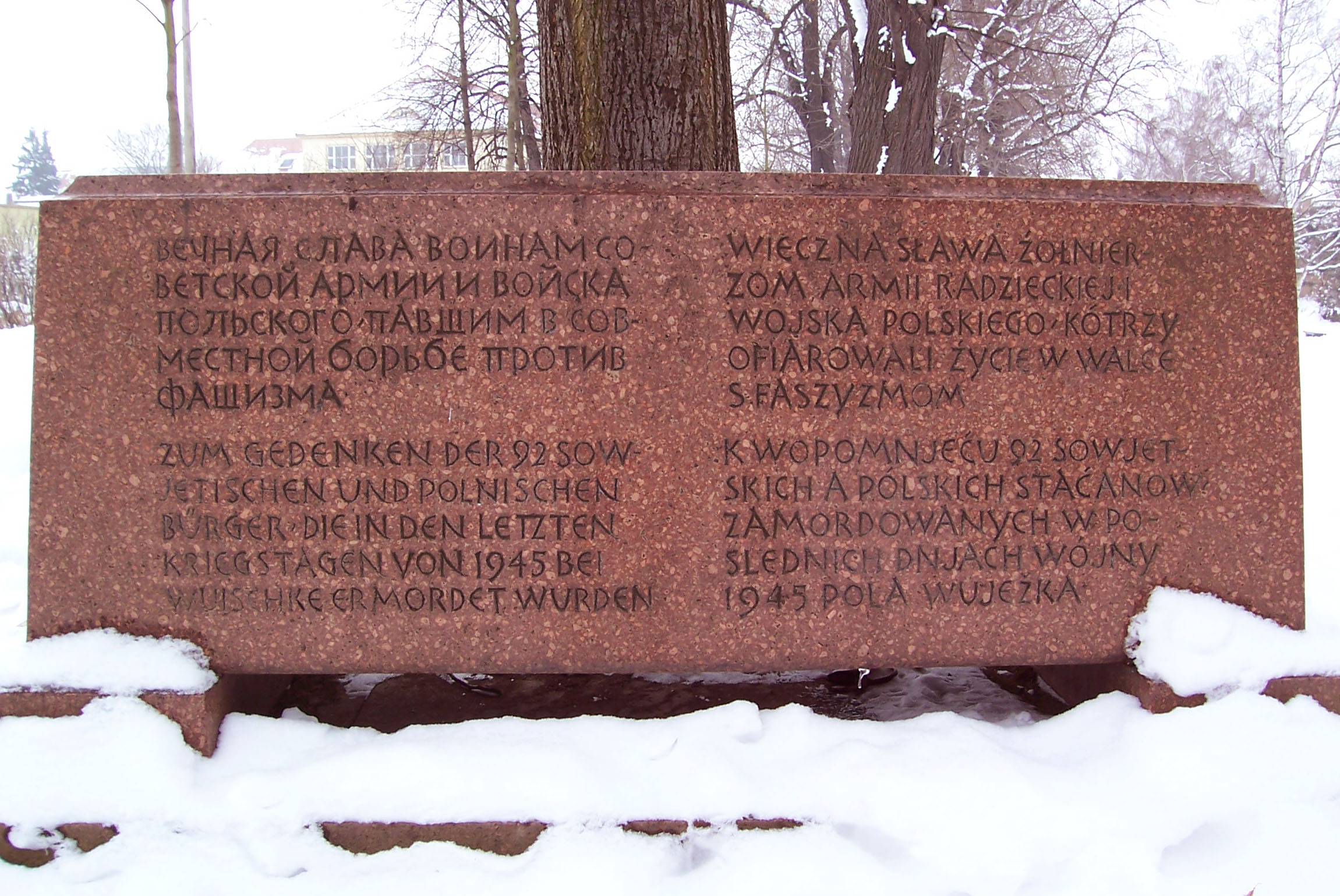
Memorial stone in Bautzen

The Army was given the task to advance towards Dresden and Bautzen on 16 April. Although the Army managed to advance, it had insufficient reinforcements of its own and the planned Soviet reinforcements were delayed, which made it vulnerable to the German counterattacks. The Second Army suffered very heavy losses at the Battle of Bautzen during April 22–26, with 18,232 dead or missing (22% of total combat personnel), and over 50% of armour. The battle was one of the most costly in terms of lives in the history of the Polish military.

Subsequently, in May, the Second Army was part of the final great Soviet offensive of World War II in Europe, the drive on Prague. By the time most Germans units have begun to surrender, the Army units have reached the town of Mělník.

=== Post war (May–August 1945) ===
After the end of World War II in Europe, the Second Army was regrouped in the vicinity of Wrocław. On 17 May it was transferred from the 1st Ukrainian Front to the High Command of the People's Army of Poland. Until August 1945 the Army was tasked with guarding the Recovered Territories and the new Polish-German frontier on the Oder-Neisse line. Among other changes, the 12th Infantry Division was reformed to guard the border in the Szczecin area. The army was disbanded in August; most of the formation was used to create the Poznań Military District.

== Order of Battle on May 1, 1945 ==
Second Army Headquarters

- 5th Infantry Division
- 7th Infantry Division
- 8th Infantry Division
- 9th Infantry Division
- 10th Infantry Division
- 2nd Artillery Division
  - 6th Light Artillery Brigade
  - 7th Howitzer Artillery Brigade
  - 8th Heavy Artillery Brigade
- 3rd Anti-Aircraft Artillery Division
- 9th Antitank Brigade
- 14th Antitank Brigade
- 3rd Mortar Regiment
- 1st Tank Corps
- 16th Tank Brigade
- 5th Heavy Tank Regiment (IS-II)
- 28th Armoured Artillery Regiment (self-propelled guns)
- 4th Sapper Brigade

== Commanders ==
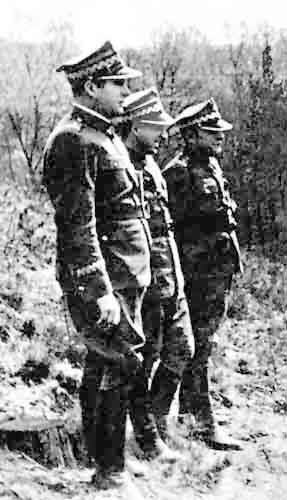
Karol Świerczewski (front). The two other officers are Marian Spychalski and Michał Rola-Żymierski

- general Karol Świerczewski from 8 August 1944 to 24 September 1944 and from 26 December 1944 onward
- general Stanisław Popławski (Stanislav Poplavsky) from 25 September 1944 to 25 December 1944
- general Florian Siwicki from 1967 to 1972

== Major campaign credits ==
- Berlin Operation April 4, 1945 – May 9, 1945
- Prague Operation May 7, 1945 – May 10, 1945

== See also ==
- Polish First Army
