= Doberschütz =

- Municipality
- Coat of arms

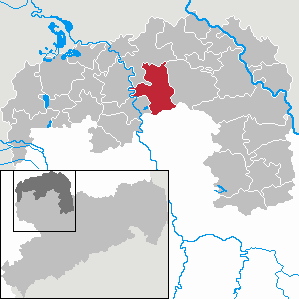
- Location of Doberschütz within Nordsachsen district
- Interactive map of Doberschütz
- Location within Germany Location within Saxony
- Coordinates: 51°30′N 12°43′E
- Country: Germany
- State: Saxony
- District: Nordsachsen

Government
  - Mayor (2017–24): Andreas Mählmann (CDU)

Area
  - Total: 79.81 km^{2} (30.81 sq mi)
- Elevation: 105 m (344 ft)

Population (2025-12-31)
  - Total: 3,985
  - Density: 49.93/km^{2} (129.3/sq mi)
- Time zone: UTC+01:00 (CET)
  - Summer (DST): UTC+02:00 (CEST)
- Postal codes: 04838
- Dialling codes: 034244
- Vehicle registration: TDO, DZ, EB, OZ, TG, TO
- Website: www.doberschuetz.de

Doberschütz is a municipality in the district of Nordsachsen, in Saxony, Germany. It has an area of 79,81 km² and a population of 4,082 (as of December 31, 2020).
