= 1st Armoured Corps (Poland) =

1st Armoured Corps (Poland) 1 Korpus Pancerny
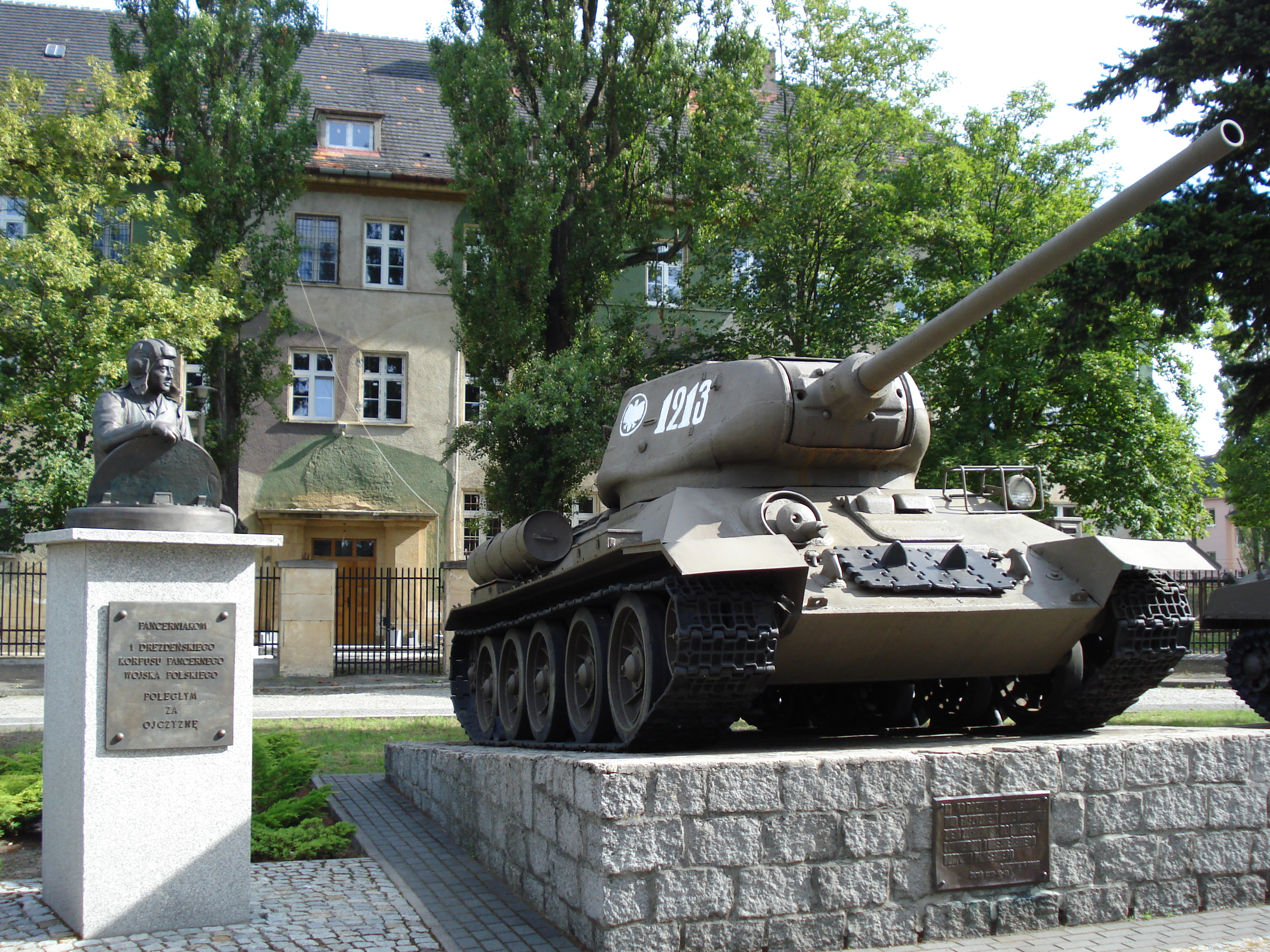
- Monument to the 1st Armoured Corps in Zagan, Poland.
- Active: July 1944 – October 1945
- Country: Poland
- Branch: Polish People's Army
- Type: Armor
- Size: Division equivalent 12,119 soldiers 210 tanks 63 SP guns
- Engagements: World War II; Battle of Bautzen; Prague Offensive
- Decorations: Order of the Cross of Grunwald III Class; Order of the Red Banner
- Battle honours: Drezdeński

The 1st Armoured Corps (Polish: 1 Korpus Pancerny) was an armoured formation of the Polish People's Army during 1944–1945. The corps saw combat in Germany in 1945. Later that year, the subordinate units of the corps were dispersed to garrisons in Poland, and the corps itself was inactivated in October 1945.

The 1st Armoured Corps (comparable in size to an armoured division of western armies of the same period) completed its formation in September 1944 and was then subordinated to the supreme command of the Polish forces that had been established by the U.S.S.R. on the eastern front. Training of the unit continued until February 1945 at Chełm. The organisation of the corps was that of a Soviet tank corps.

The corps supported Polish 2nd Army attacks in the direction of Dresden starting on April 16, 1945. The corps had almost reached Dresden when it was recalled on April 22 to counter-attack German units attacking at Bautzen. The corps then assisted in sealing the western flank of the German penetration.

From 4 to 11 May 1945, the corps took part in the Prague Offensive, a major Soviet operation that forced the surrender of German Army Group Center. At the end of the operation, the corps had crossed the border into Czechoslovakia and was near the town of Mělník. Following the end of combat operations, the 1st Armoured Corps was redeployed to Görlitz. The corps re-entered Poland during 20–21 May. Its subordinate units were subsequently dispersed and the corps itself was inactivated on October 5, 1945.

From 1949 until 1952, and from 1955 until 1957, another formation in the Polish Army was designated "1st Armoured Corps". This unit, however, did not carry the traditions of the wartime 1st "Dresden" Armoured Corps. Unlike the wartime unit, the second formation was an actual corps in structure, commanding two divisions.

== Commanders ==
- Col. Jan Rupasow (acting 26 VII — 4 VIII 1944)
- Col. Siergiej Fomińskij (acting 4 VIII — 26 IX 1944)
- Brig. Gen. Józef Kimbar (26 IX 1944 – X 1945)

== Order of battle ==
The 1st corps was composed of the following units (equipment listed as it was just before the corps entered combat in April 1945):

- Corps HQ
- 1 Mechanized Infantry Brigade (Poland)
- 2 Sudety Armoured Brigade - 65 T-34-85 tanks, 6 M-17 anti-aircraft half tracks
- 3 Dresden Armoured Brigade - 65 T-34-85 tanks, 6 M-17 anti-aircraft half tracks
- 4 Dresden Armoured Brigade - 65 T-34-85 tanks, 6 M-17 anti-aircraft half tracks
- 24 Dresden Armoured Artillery Regiment - 21 SU-85 self-propelled guns
- 25 Dresden Armoured Artillery Regiment - 21 ISU-122 self-propelled guns
- 27 Dresden Armoured Artillery Regiment - 21 SU-76 self-propelled guns
- plus numerous additional support formations

== Sources ==
- Czesław Grzelak, Henryk Stańczyk, and Stefan Zwoliński, Armia Berlinga i Żymierskiego, Warszawa: Wydawnictwo Neriton, 2002. ISBN 83-88973-27-4.
- Steven J. Zaloga and Richard Hook, The Polish Army 1939 - 45, Oxford: Osprey, 1998. ISBN 978-0-85045-417-8.
