= 294th Rifle Division =

- Active: 1941–1945
- Country: Soviet Union
- Branch: Red Army
- Type: Rifle division
- Engagements: World War II
- Decorations: Order of the Red Banner; Order of Suvorov 2nd class; Order of Kutuzov 2nd class; Order of Bogdan Khmelnitsky 2nd class
- Battle honours: Cherkasy

Commanders
- Notable commanders: Grigory Korolenko

The 294th Rifle Division (Russian: 294-я стрелковая дивизия) was an infantry division of the Soviet Union's Red Army during World War II. Formed in the summer of 1941, the 294th fought in the Leningrad area until May 1943. The division served with the 52nd Army for most of the rest of the war until its redesignation in the summer of 1945.

== History ==
The 294th began forming on 10 July 1941 at Lipetsk, part of the Orel Military District. Its basic order of battle included the 857th, 859th, and 861st Rifle Regiments, as well as the 849th Artillery Regiment and the 565th Sapper Battalion. After spending two months forming, the division was sent north to the Leningrad Front's 54th Army in late September. The 294th held positions east of the city in the Volkhov River area until May 1942 as part of the 8th Army or the 54th Army. In May 1943, the 294th was transferred to the 52nd Army in the Reserve of the Supreme High Command. It would remain part of the 52nd Army for most of the rest of the war. In August, the division was sent to the front with the army in the Voronezh Front, then transferred to the 2nd Ukrainian Front in October.

From September 1944, the 294th was in the Reserve of the Supreme High Command for a few weeks, and the 52nd Army moved north to the 1st Ukrainian Front. During March and April the 294th was briefly transferred to the 6th Army, but soon transferred back to the 52nd Army, serving in its 48th Rifle Corps. Soon after the end of the war, the 294th was relocated to Yavoriv in western Ukraine, along with the rest of the 52nd Army. On 10 July, the 294th was redesignated as the recently disbanded 24th Rifle Division. This meant that the new division's subunits were renumbered to the subunits of old 24th and it also inherited the previous division's honorifics.
