= Seltsy =

Seltsy (Russian: Сельцы) is the name of several rural localities in Russia:

- Seltsy, Moscow Oblast, a village in Moscow Oblast
- Seltsy, Ryazan Oblast, a selo in Ryazan Oblast
- Seltsy, Tver Oblast, a selo in Tver Oblast
