= Battle of Schoenfeld =

Battle of World War II

- Part of the East Pomeranian Offensive in the Eastern Front of World War II
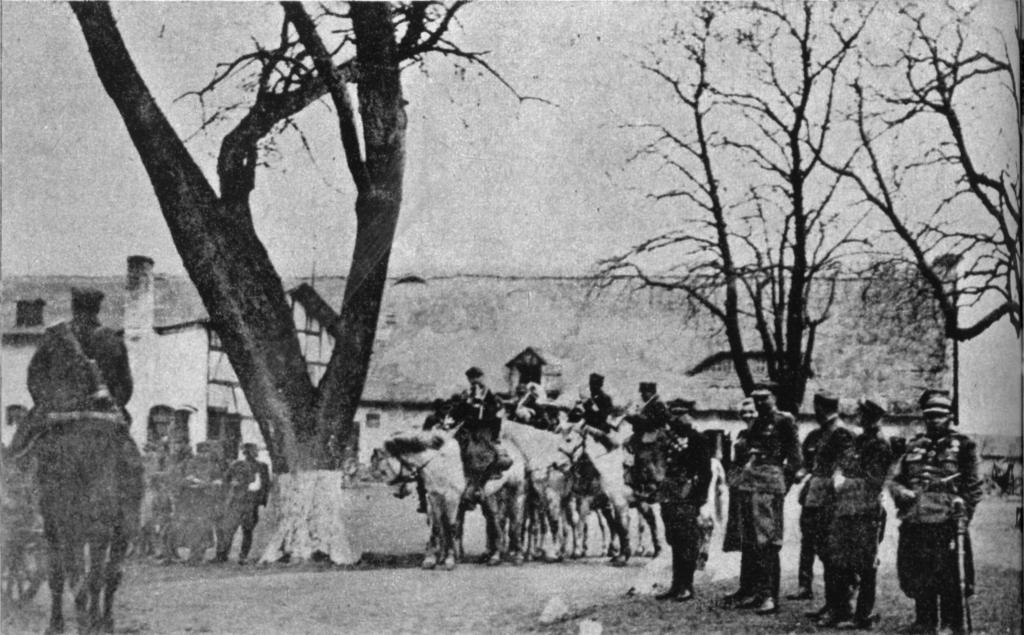
- Polish 1st Cavalry Brigade, March 1945
Date	March 1, 1945
Location	Żeńsko in Pomerania 53°24′38″N 16°04′40″E
Result	Polish victory

Belligerents
Poland	Germany

Commanders and leaders
Jan Rotkiewicz (2nd ID); Konstanty Gryżawski (1st Cavalry Brig)	Karl Rübel (163. ID)

Units involved
2nd Infantry Division; 1st "Warsaw" Independent Cavalry Brigade	163rd Infantry Division

Casualties and losses
Polish forces: 147 killed	German forces: c. 500 killed

The Battle of Schoenfeld (Polish: Szarża pod Borujskiem) took place on 1 March 1945 during World War II and was the scene of the last mounted charge in the history of the Polish cavalry. (Note: The website www.historycy.org notes the assertion by Polish author Cezar Leżeński (in Ostatnia szarża) that further cavalry charges were made on April 21, 1945, at Heckelberg and Grunthal (six kilometers east of Heckelberg); as well as mentioning a mounted charge by Polish frontier security forces (Wojska Ochrony Pogranicza) against UPA insurgents in 1947.) The Polish charge overran German defensive positions and forced a German retreat from the village of Schoenfeld (today known as Żeńsko, formerly known in Polish as Borujsko). In March 1945, the First Army of the Polish People's Army was advancing into Pomerania as part of an overall push by, and backed by, Soviet forces to reach the Baltic Sea and the area of Stettin (some 50 miles (80 km) northwest of Schoenfeld). Schoenfeld was part of the third line of fortifications built by the Germans to shelter Pomerania from attack.

An initial Polish attack on Schoenfeld with tanks and infantry of the 2nd Infantry Division floundered in the low, open wetlands that were dominated by the fire of infantry and antitank guns from Schoenfeld, which sat at a slightly higher elevation on a small hill (Hill 157). German troops defending the village were part of the 163rd Infantry Division.

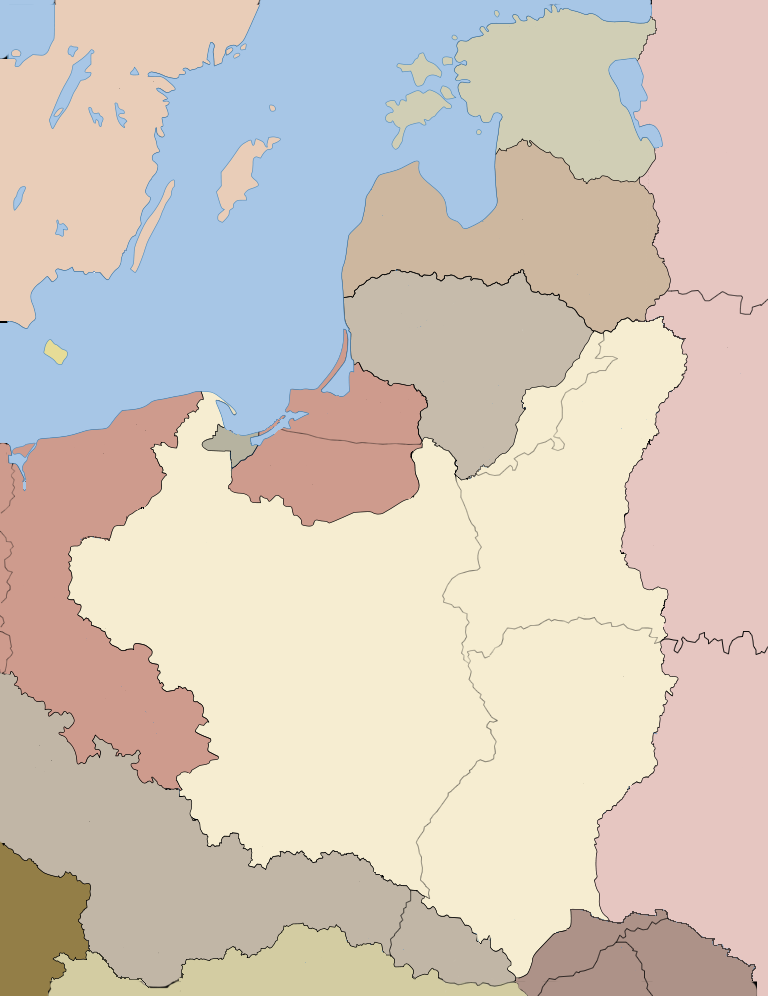
Location of the Battle of Schoenfeld

The 1st "Warsaw" Independent Cavalry Brigade was then employed against the German position. Two squadrons (companies) of cavalry supported by the elements of the horse--artillery company, having used a ravine to cover their approach to their infantry and tanker brothers-in-arms, charged through the smoke of burning tanks, and achieved tactical surprise with a swift mounted assault that overran the German antitank gun positions on the forward slope of Hill 157. This success was followed by an attack into the village itself by the cavalry, who by this time had been joined by the infantry and tanks. In the face of this development, the surviving German defenders withdrew, allowing the Poles to consolidate their gains in and around the village at 1700. 7 Polish cavalrymen, 124 Polish infantry, and 16 tank crewmen were killed for circa 500 dead Germans.

Today, a plaque mounted on a stone near the edge of Żeńsko commemorates the cavalry charge.

== Sources ==
- Krzysztof Komorowski, Boje Polskie 1939–1945, Warszawa: Bellona, 2009.
- Janusz Piekalkiewicz, The Cavalry of World War II, New York: Stein and Day, 1980.
- Steven J. Zaloga, The Polish Army 1939–45, Oxford: Osprey, 1998.
- www.polskaniezwykla.pl
