= Walter König =

Polish inventor (1903–1996)

Walter John König (Polish: Walter Jan König; 25 June 1903 – 26 February 1966) was an Austrian-Polish inventor, industrialist and soldier who fought for Polish freedom during the Second World War.

== Life ==
Walter König was born on 25 of June 1903 in Bielitz, in a Jewish family. No sooner did Poland regain its independence than he acquired Polish citizenship.

He spent his early life in Bielitz. Having had finished school, he headed for Vienna to study at the local university. Unfortunately, as Austria did not recognize dual citizenship, he had to renounce Polish citizenship. In 1925 he patented the manufacture of objects of early plastics. In 1930, Eng. König founded the "Rogolith" company in Bielsko, which produced buttons from these artificial materials. About 60 people were employed in this company.

In 1938 he was baptized. At the end of the 1930s König also applied for Polish citizenship. However, it was not easy, even though he married a Polish woman. His attempt was interrupted by the outbreak of World War II. While many Polish citizens of German origin living in Bielsko supported the Wehrmacht and conducted sabotage against the Polish soldiers, Walter König volunteered to join the Polish Army. After losing the September campaign he was sent to the Soviet Union.

There, due to his education, he was sent to Siberia, where he was involved in infrastructure development. Though, he still wanted to fight for Poland's freedom. Despite his efforts, he failed to join General Anders's Army. It was not until 7 November 1943 that he became a private soldier in the 5th Heavy Artillery Brigade in Sletsy. Later on, he participated in numerous battles, including liberation of Warsaw, Oder-crossing and battle of Berlin.

When he returned to Bielsko, it came to light that he did not have Polish citizenship. The new communist regime suggested that he should go to Germany. His past as an industrialist was also a detriment. In 1946, however, he managed to bring his wife back from the USSR, and a year later he was called to receive Polish citizenship. Sadly, his button factory was taken away from him. König found work in a building materials' warehouse. For the next years he was subject to surveillance and even arrested under false charges of stealing materials from his workplace. At the end of his life, he fell seriously ill. Nevertheless, he did not want to leave Poland to go to Sweden for treatment because he knew that the communist authorities would not allow him to return to his homeland.

Walter König died on 26 February 1966. He was buried in Bielsko-Biala.

== Bibliography ==
- Kachel Jacek, Sekrety Bielska-Białej, Wyd. 1., Łódź, Księży Młyn Dom Wydawniczy, 2016 (in Polish)
- Private archive of the König family
- http://jacekkachel.blogspot.com/2013/08/pamiec-buduje-swiadomosc.html (in Polish)
