= 2nd Warsaw Infantry Division =

2nd Warsaw Infantry Division of Henryk Dąbrowski
- 2 Warszawska Dywizja Piechoty im. Henryka Dąbrowskiego
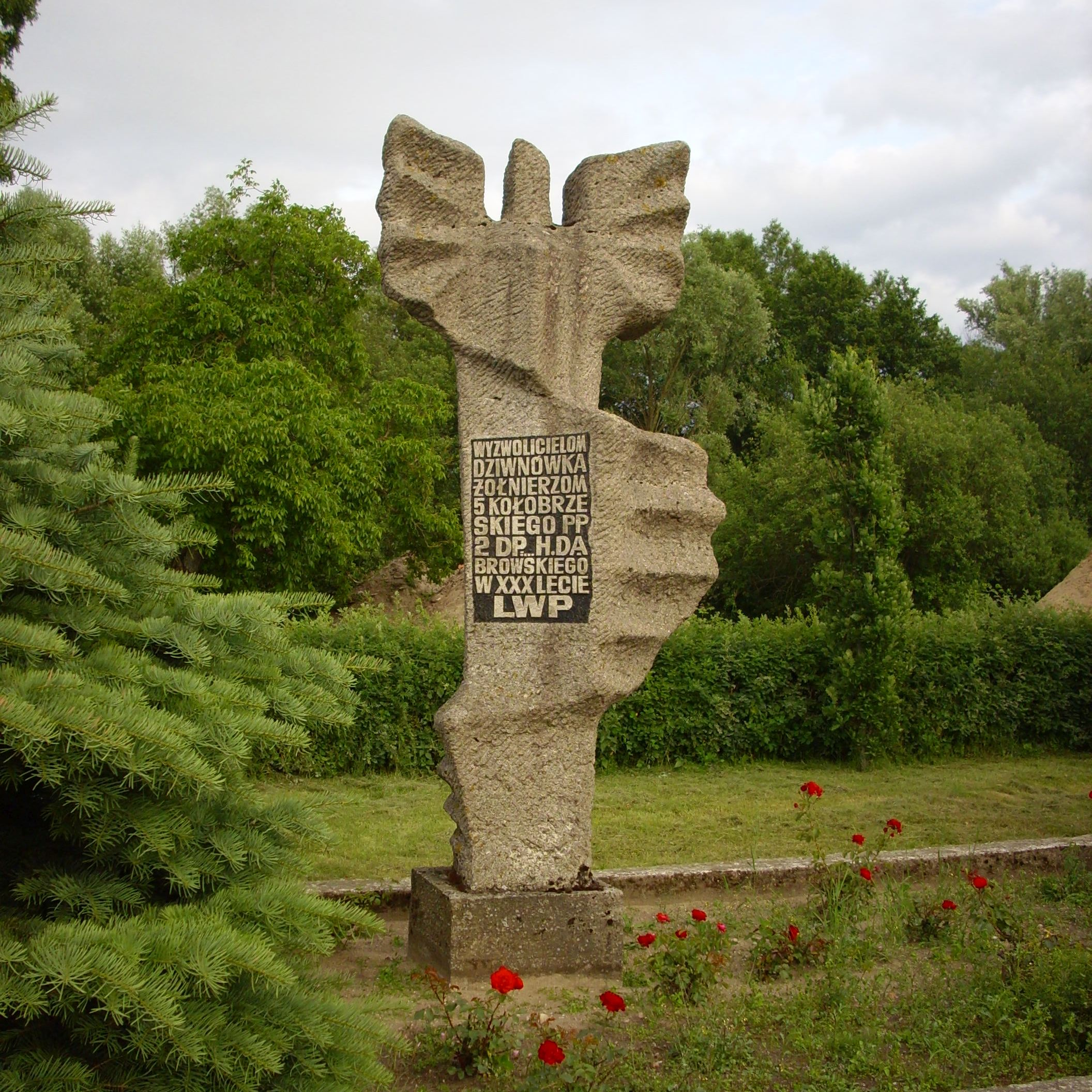
- Monument to the 5th Kołobrzeg Infantry Regiment of the 2nd Infantry Division of Henryk Dąbrowski in Dziwnówek
- Active: 1943–1956
- Country: Poland
- Branch: Army
- Type: Infantry
- Size: 3 Infantry regiments, 1 Light Artillery regiment
- Part of: First Polish Army (1944–1945)
- Patron: Jan Henryk Dąbrowski
- Anniversaries: September 1
- Engagements: World War II: Battle of Berlin
- Decorations: Order of the Cross of Grunwald (3rd Class), Order of the Red Banner

Commanders
- First commander: Col. Antoni Siwicki
- Last commander: Col. Zbigniew Ohanowicz

2nd Warsaw Infantry Division of Henryk Dąbrowski (Polish: 2 Warszawska Dywizja Piechoty im. Henryka Dąbrowskiego) was an infantry division of the Polish First Army during World War II and Polish People's Army in the post-war period.

== History ==
It was formed and first stationed in Seltsy. It was relocated to Laptevo near Smolensk in January 1944, where it joined the 1st Tadeusz Kościuszko Infantry Division.

It fought near Vistula and Warsaw, in Pomerania and in the Battle of Berlin. It was mostly disbanded during reorganization in 1956, with traditions inherited by the 2nd Warsaw Mechanized Division (itself based also on the 7th Infantry Division).
