= Żeńsko, Drawsko County =

Żeńsko
- Village
- Location within Poland
- Coordinates: 53°24′38″N 16°4′40″E
- Country: Poland
- Voivodeship: West Pomeranian
- County: Drawsko
- Gmina: Wierzchowo
- Population: 160

Żeńsko [ˈʐɛɲskɔ] (German: Schönfeld) is a village in the administrative district of Gmina Wierzchowo, within Drawsko County, West Pomeranian Voivodeship, in north-western Poland. It lies approximately 6 km (4 mi) south of Wierzchowo, 23 km (14 mi) south-east of Drawsko Pomorskie, and 100 km (62 mi) east of the regional capital Szczecin. It used to be known in Polish before 1945 as Borujsko.

Żeńsko was then known as Schönfeld, and in Polish as Borujsko. For the history of the region, see History of Pomerania.

The village has a population of 160.

== Events ==
- Battle of Schoenfeld
