= Kościuszko Infantry Division Memorial =

Monument in Warsaw, Poland

- Pomnik Kościuszkowców
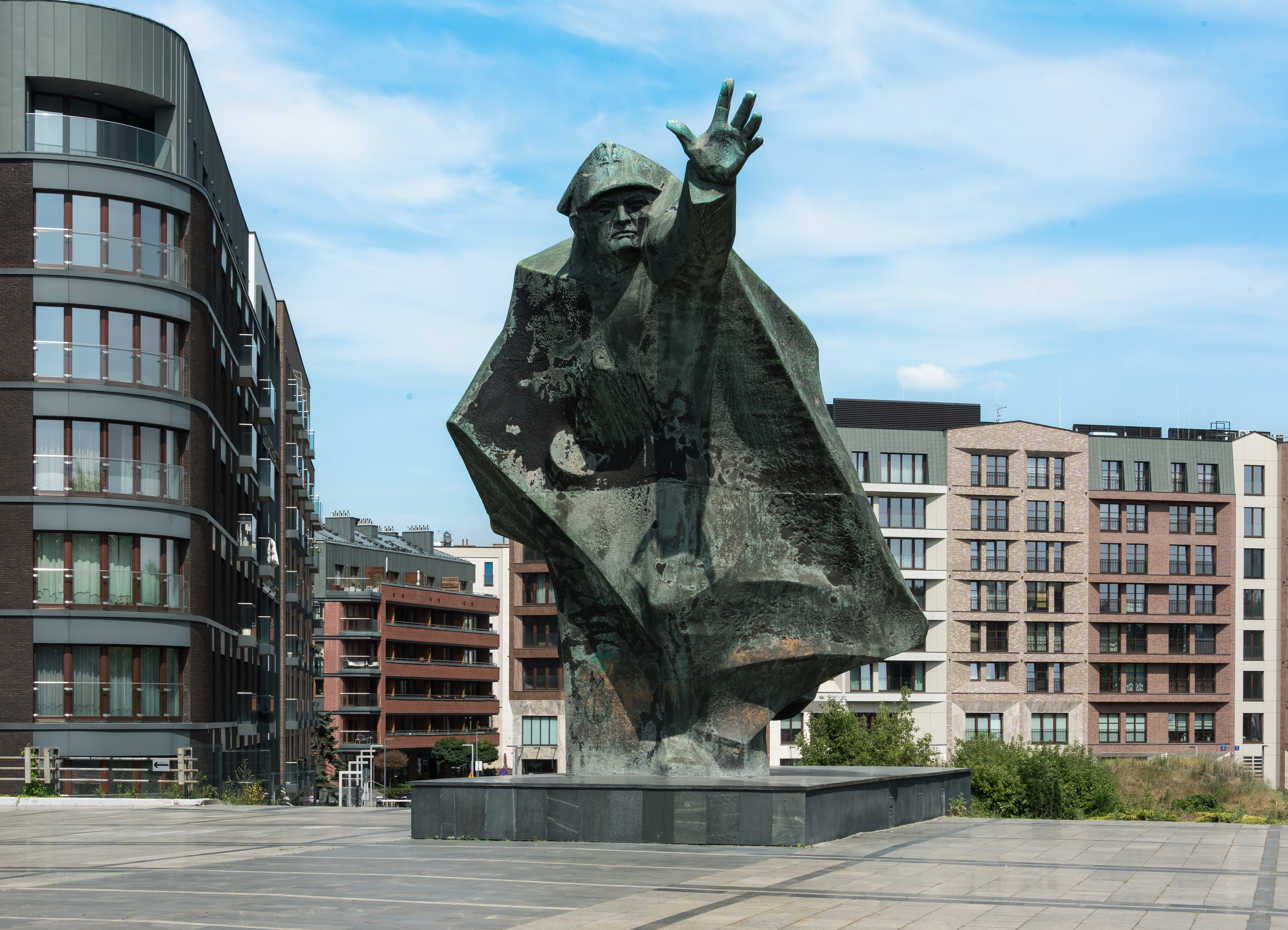
- The Kościuszko Infantry Division Memorial
- Interactive map of Kościuszko Infantry Division Memorial
- Location: The intersection of Wybrzeże Helskie Street and Okrzei Street
- Coordinates: 52°14′53″N 21°01′50″E
- Designer: Andrzej Kasten (sculpture), Bogusław Chyliński (architectural design)
- Material: Bronze
- Height: 16 m (52 ft)
- Beginning date: October 7, 1983
- Opening date: January 17, 1985
- Dedicated to: Polish 1st Tadeusz Kościuszko Infantry Division

The Kościuszko Infantry Division Memorial (Pomnik Kościuszkowców) commemorates the attempt to aid the Warsaw Uprising by soldiers of the Soviet-organised Polish 1st Tadeusz Kościuszko Infantry Division during World War II. It stands at the intersection of Wybrzeże Helskie and Okrzei Streets at the entrance to Port Praski (the port of Praga) in North Praga in Warsaw, near the former Komora Wodna building on the Vistula river.

By September 14, 1944, troops from the Polish 1st Infantry Division and the Red Army had cleared the Wehrmacht from the capital city's right bank (known as Praga), while the Warsaw Uprising was still ongoing from August 1 across the river in Warsaw proper. Detachments from the Polish Division attempted several landings at Czerniaków (in Solec) and Kępa Potocka (in Żoliborz) to give their support to the Uprising. However, due to insufficient planning and non-existent tactical support, the landings ultimately failed to relieve the Polish partisan army in the capitol.

== History ==
The chairman of the committee for construction of the monument was Włodzimierz Sokorski. In the spring of 1979 a design competition awarded the work to sculptor Andrzej Kasten from among thirty entries, under the slogan "... but the most beautiful is our Vistula shore," a line from a popular war-era song about the 1st Division.

The monument was planned for completion by 1980, but work was delayed by the rise of the Solidarity movement and the ensuing declaration of martial law by the communist regime. Through the initiative of the Union of Veteran Combatants as well as the affiliated Kosciuszko Club, work started with the foundation stone laid on October 7, 1983 in connection with the 40th anniversary of the Polish People's Army founding. The 12-meter, 48-ton sculpture was cast in bronze at the Zakłady Mechaniczne im. Marcelego Nowotki. The monumental statue depicts a soldier clutching a PPSh-41 and clothed with a billowing cape, desperately reaching out his hand towards the left-bank of Warsaw. All told the statue contains about 300 elements. Due to the enormity of the casting's size and weight, a special transportation route from the factory to the final site was required.

The whole composition is over 16 meters high, and is surrounded by a large stone-paved square planted with greenery. The architectural designer of the monument was Bogusław Chyliński. The project involved contributions from numerous businesses, veterans groups, youth groups and the soldiers from the Polish Army. The unveiling of the monument took place on January 17, 1985 on the 40th anniversary of the liberation of Warsaw.

It is sometimes jokingly referred to as "five beers please" by the locals, in reference to the hand gesture of the soldier.

In 2011, due to a proposed development at Port Praski, plans emerged to move the monument to the Świętokrzyski Bridge, however the move has not progressed as of 2018.
