= Charge (warfare) =

Military tactics of rapid all-out attack

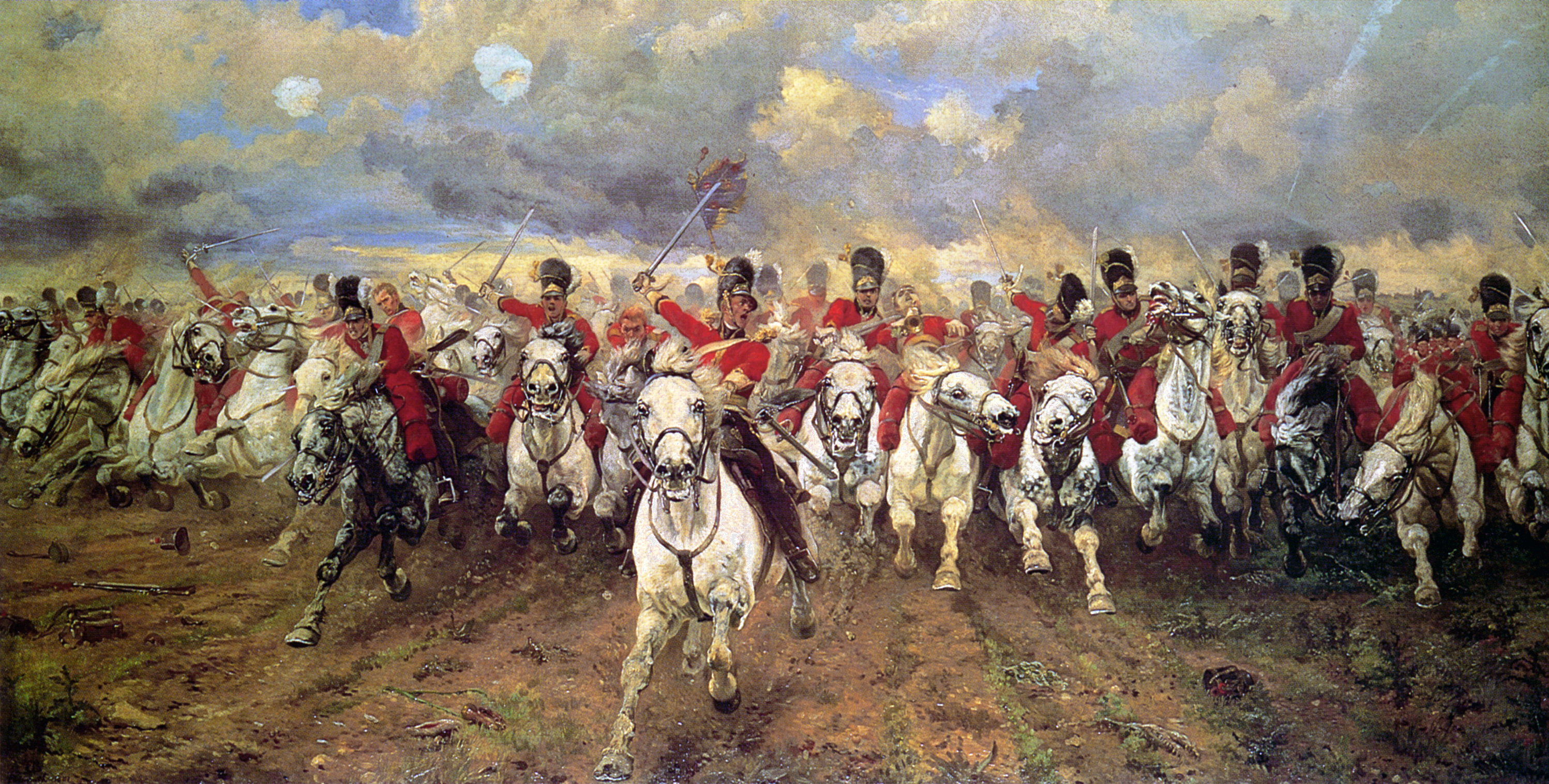
Scotland Forever!, a romanticized painting of the Royal Scots Greys charging at the Battle of Waterloo during the Napoleonic Wars

A charge is an offensive maneuver in battle in which combatants advance towards their enemy at their best speed in an attempt to engage in a decisive close combat. The charge is the dominant shock attack and has been the key tactic and decisive moment of many battles throughout history. Today, charges usually involve small groups of fireteams equipped with weapons with a high rate of fire striking against individual defensive positions (such as a concertainer or bunker), instead of large groups of combatants charging another group or a fortified line.

== Ancient charges ==
It may be assumed that the charge was used in prehistoric warfare, but clear evidence only comes with later literate societies. The tactics of the classical Greek phalanx included an ordered approach march, with a final charge to contact.

== Infantry charges ==
=== Highland charge ===
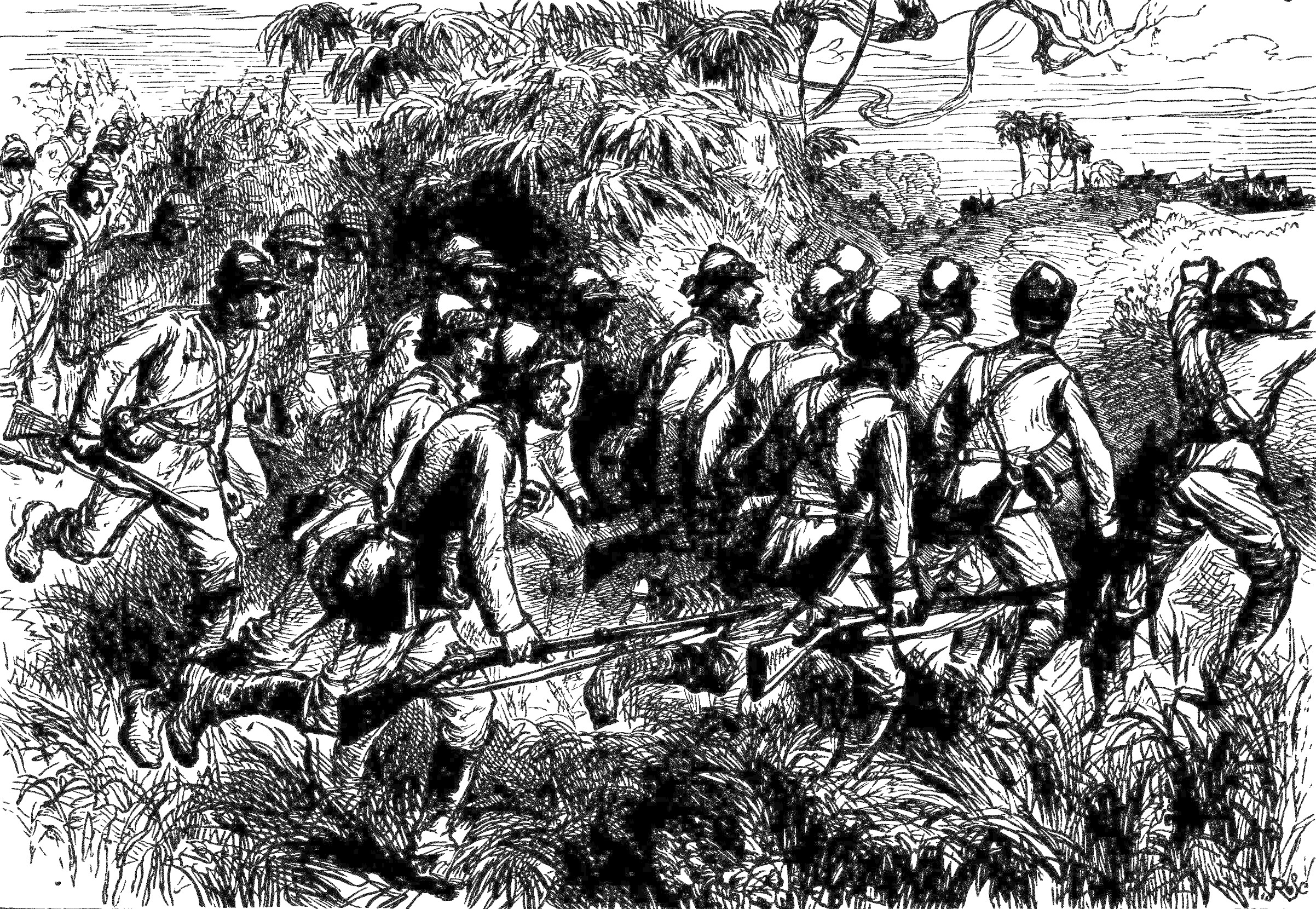
Charge of Highlanders at the Battle of Amoaful

In response to the introduction of firearms, Irish and Scottish troops at the end of the 16th century developed a tactic that combined a volley of musketry with a transition to rapid hand-to-hand combat using melee weapons. Initially successful, it was countered by effective discipline and the development of defensive bayonet tactics.

=== Banzai charge ===
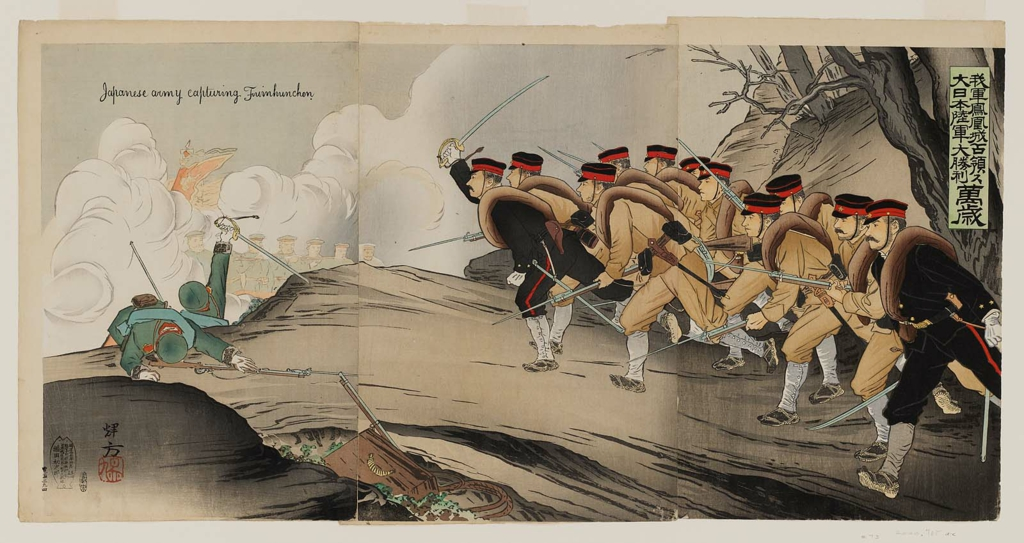
Japanese woodcut print depicting an infantry charge in the Russo-Japanese War

A term used by the Allied forces to refer to Japanese human wave attacks and swarming staged by infantry units armed with bayonets and swords. This term came from the Japanese battle cry "Tennōheika Banzai" (天皇陛下万歳, "Long live His Majesty the Emperor"), shortened to banzai, specifically referring to a tactic used by the Imperial Japanese Army during the Pacific War.

=== Bayonet charge ===
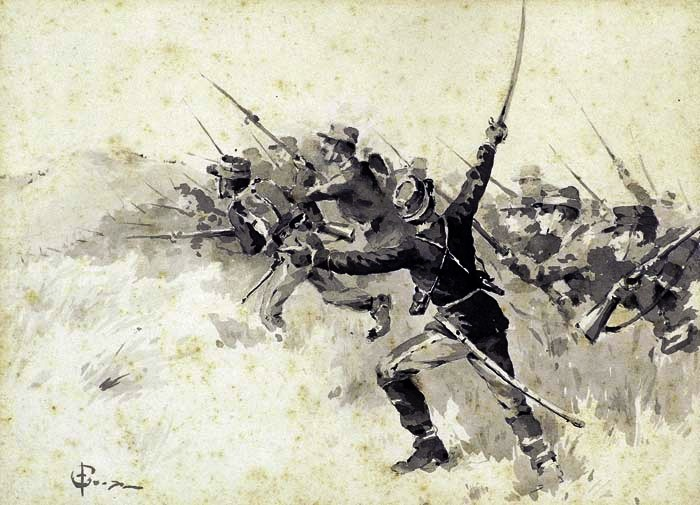
Greek infantry charge with the bayonet during the Greco-Turkish War of 1897

The development of the bayonet in the late 17th century led to the bayonet charge becoming the main infantry charge tactic through the 18th and 19th centuries and well into the first half of the 20th century. As early as the 19th century, tactical scholars were already noting that most bayonet charges did not result in close combat. Instead, one side usually fled before actual bayonet fighting ensued. The act of fixing bayonets has been held to be primarily connected to morale, the making of a clear signal to friend and foe of a willingness to kill at close quarters.

== Cavalry charges ==
The shock value of a charge attack has been especially exploited in cavalry tactics, both of armored knights and lighter mounted troops of both earlier and later eras. Historians such as John Keegan have shown that when correctly prepared against (such as by improvising fortifications) and, especially, by standing firm in face of the onslaught, cavalry charges often failed against infantry, with horses refusing to gallop into the dense mass of enemies, or the charging unit itself breaking up. However, when cavalry charges succeeded, it was usually due to the defending formation breaking up (often in fear) and scattering, to be hunted down by the enemy. While it was not recommended for a cavalry charge to continue against unbroken infantry, charges were still a viable danger to heavy infantry.

Parthian lancers were noted to require significantly dense formations of Roman legionaries to stop, and Frankish knights were reported to be even harder to stop, if the writing of Anna Komnene is to be believed. However, only highly trained horses would voluntarily charge dense, unbroken enemy formations directly, and in order to be effective, a strong formation had to be kept – being the result of efficient training. Heavy cavalry lacking even a single part of this combination – composed of high morale, excellent training, quality equipment, individual prowess, and collective discipline of both the warrior and the mount – would suffer in a charge against unbroken heavy infantry, and only the very best heavy cavalrymen (e.g., knights and cataphracts) throughout history would own these in regards to their era and terrain.

=== European Middle Ages ===
The cavalry charge was a significant tactic in the Middle Ages. Although cavalry had charged before, a combination of the adoption of a frame saddle secured in place by a breast-band, stirrups and the technique of couching the lance under the arm delivered a hitherto unachievable ability to utilise the momentum of the horse and rider. These developments began in the 7th century but were not combined to full effect until the 11th century. The Battle of Dyrrhachium (1081) was an early instance of the familiar medieval cavalry charge; recorded to have a devastating effect by both Norman and Byzantine chroniclers. By the time of the First Crusade in the 1090s, the cavalry charge was being employed widely by European armies.

However, from the dawn of the Hundred Years' War onward, the use of professional pikemen and longbowmen with high morale and functional tactics meant that a knight would have to be cautious in a cavalry charge. Men wielding either pike or halberd in formation, with high morale, could stave off all but the best cavalry charges, whilst English archers with the longbow could unleash a torrent of arrows capable of wreaking havoc, though not necessarily a massacre, upon the heads of heavy infantry and cavalry in unsuitable terrain. It became increasingly common for knights to dismount and fight as elite heavy infantry, although some continued to stay mounted throughout combat. The use of cavalry for flanking manoeuvres became more useful, although some interpretations of the knightly ideal often led to reckless, undisciplined charges.

Cavalry could still charge dense heavy infantry formations head-on if the cavalrymen had a combination of certain traits. They had a high chance of success if they were in a formation, collectively disciplined, highly skilled, and equipped with the best arms and armour, as well as mounted upon horses trained to endure the physical and mental stresses of such charges. However, the majority of cavalry personnel lacked at least one of these traits, particularly discipline, formations, and horses trained for head-on charges. Thus, the use of the head-on cavalry charge declined, although Polish hussars, French cuirassiers, and Spanish and Portuguese conquistadores were still capable of succeeding in such charges, often due to their possession of the previously mentioned combination of the traits required for success in such endeavours.

=== Twentieth century ===
In the twentieth century, the cavalry charge was seldom used, though it enjoyed sporadic and occasional success.

Elements of the 7th Cavalry Regiment of the United States attacked Villista forces in the Battle of Guerrero on 29 March 1916. The battle was a victory for the Americans, occurring in desert terrain, at the Mexican town of Vicente Guerrero, Chihuahua.

One of the most successful offensive cavalry charges of the 20th century was not conducted by cavalry at all, but rather by mounted infantry, when on 31 October 1917, the Australian 4th Light Horse Brigade charged across two miles of open terrain in the face of Ottoman artillery and machine gun fire to successfully capture Beersheba in what would come to be known as the Battle of Beersheba.

On 23 September 1918, the Jodhpur Lancers and Mysore Lancers of the 15th (Imperial Service) Cavalry Brigade charged Turkish positions on horseback at Haifa. Together the two regiments captured 1,350 German and Ottoman prisoners, including two German officers, 35 Ottoman officers, 17 artillery guns including four 4.2 in (11 cm) guns, eight 77 mm (3.0 in) guns and four camel guns as well as a 6 in (15 cm) naval gun, and 11 machine guns. Their own casualties amounted to eight dead and 34 wounded. 60 horses were killed and another 83 injured.

On 16 May 1919, during the Third Anglo-Afghan War, the 1st King's Dragoon Guards made the last recorded charge by a British horsed cavalry regiment at Dakka, a village in Afghan territory, north west of the Khyber Pass.

During the Spanish Civil War, there was a massive cavalry charge by a Francoist division during the Battle of Alfambra on 5 February 1938, the last great mounted charge in Western Europe.

Several attempted charges were made in World War II. The Polish cavalry, in spite of being primarily trained to operate as rapid infantry and being better armed than regular Polish infantry (more anti-tank weapons and armored vehicles per capita) did execute up to 15 cavalry charges during the Invasion of Poland. The majority of the charges were successful and none were meant as a charge against armored vehicles. Some battles featured mutual charges by the Polish and German cavalry such as the Battle of Krasnobród (1939). The German cavalry scouts from 4th Light Division (Germany) charged the Polish infantry from 10th Motorized Cavalry Brigade (Poland) and were countered by Polish tankettes moving from concealed positions at Zakliczyn. On November 17, 1941, during the Battle of Moscow, the Soviet 44th Cavalry Division charged the German lines near Musino, west of the capital. The mounted Soviets were ravaged by German artillery, then by machine guns. The charge failed, and the Germans said they killed 2,000 cavalrymen without a single loss to themselves. On 24 August 1942, the defensive charge of the Savoia Cavalleria at Izbushensky against Russian lines near the Don River was successful. British and American cavalry units also made similar cavalry charges during World War II (see 26th Cavalry Regiment). The last successful cavalry charge of World War II was executed during the Battle of Schoenfeld on March 1, 1945. The Polish cavalry, fighting on the Soviet side, overwhelmed the German artillery position and allowed for infantry and tanks to charge into the city. The cavalry sustained only seven dead, while 26 Polish tankmen and 124 infantrymen as well as around 500 German soldiers were killed.

After World War II, the cavalry charge was clearly outdated and was no longer employed; this, however, did not stop modern troops from utilising horses for transport, and in countries with mounted police, similar (albeit unarmed) techniques to the cavalry charge are sometimes employed to fend off rioters and large crowds.

=== Twenty-first century ===
At the start of the war in Afghanistan by United States forces, there was a cavalry charge by a unit of Green Berets led by Captain Mark Nutsch, and their use of horses in the charge was made into a Hollywood movie, 12 Strong. Across from the site of the former World Trade Center (1973–2001) there is a monument to the 'horse soldiers' who took part in that daring cavalry charge.

== Age of firearms ==
In the age of firearms, the basic parameters are speed of advance against rate (or effectiveness) of fire. If the attackers advance at a more rapid rate than the defenders can kill or disable them then the attackers will reach the defenders (though not necessarily without being greatly weakened in numbers). There are many modifiers to this simple comparison – timing, covering fire, organization, formation and terrain, among others. A failed charge may leave the would-be attackers vulnerable to a counter-charge.

There has been a constant rise in an army's rate of fire for the last 700 years or so, but while massed charges have been successfully broken they have also been victorious. It is only since the mid-19th century that straight charges have become less successful, especially since the introduction of the repeating rifles, machine guns, and breech-loading artillery. They are often still useful on a far smaller scale in confined areas where the enemy's firepower cannot be brought to bear. Bayonet charges are still seen in the early 20th century, but are often limited to use against adversaries with inferior firepowers, when ammunition supply is scarce, or simply as a form of suicide attack to inflict fear on the enemy.

Melee charges have become practically extinct outside of riot control and street fighting, with a few exceptions such as the bayonet charge at the Battle of Danny Boy, but military charging tactics mainly take place with armored fighting vehicles such as tanks, infantry fighting vehicles, and armored cars. These ground combat vehicles can either advance directly with marching fire, or transport infantry attackers quickly into proximity with the target position in order to assault and capture it. Air assaults are also a frequently used tactic to insert special operation raids against high-value targets.

== Notable charges ==
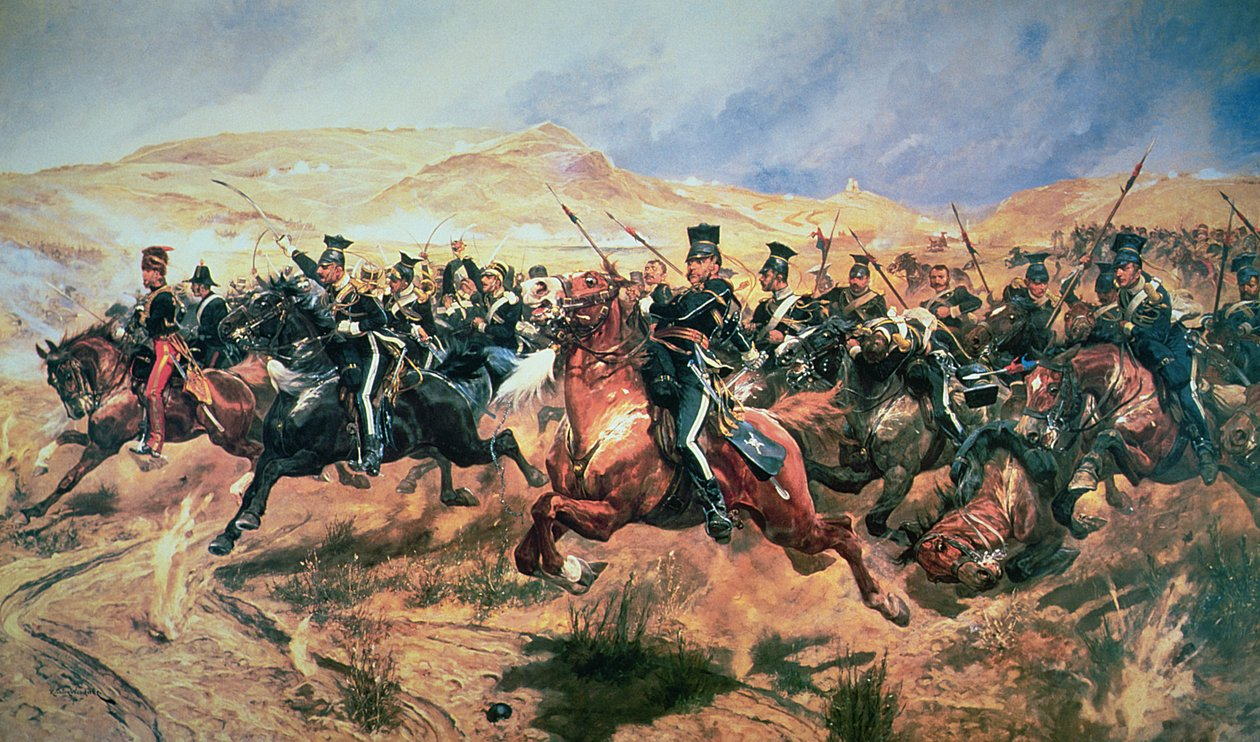
Charge of the Light Brigade, Balaclava, 25 October 1854 (Richard Caton Woodville Jr., 1894)

- Battle of the Golden Spurs (July 11, 1302): The French cavalry, consisting of many nobles, was defeated in battle by heavily armed Flemish militiamen on foot. The cavalry charge was cited to be rash and premature with the battlefield's many ditches and marshes blamed for the loss, and at a few points on the Flemish line the French horsemen did manage to break through before being surrounded and annihilated. However it also demonstrated that well-disciplined and heavily armed infantry could defeat cavalry charges, ending the perception that heavy cavalry was practically invincible against infantry. The Battle of the Golden Spurs had been seen as the first example of the gradual "Infantry Revolution" in Medieval warfare across Europe during the 14th century.
- Charge of the Light Brigade (October 25, 1854) at the Battle of Balaclava in the Crimean War. Due to faulty orders a tiny force of 670 British light cavalrymen charged an enemy force many times their size. They succeeded in breaking through as well as disengaging, but suffered extremely heavy casualties and achieved no important objectives. Extensively memorialised and the subject of several literary and cinematographic works.
- Pickett's Charge (July 3, 1863) at the Battle of Gettysburg in the American Civil War. A mass infantry assault on the Union lines repulsed with substantial loss. Pickett's Charge has become one of the central symbols of the literary and cultural movement known as the Lost Cause.
- Battle of Mars-la-Tour (August 16, 1870): "Von Bredow's Death Ride". Prussian heavy cavalry brigade overrun French infantry and artillery to reinforce left flank of Prussian Army, at the cost of half the brigade. One of the few notable examples of successful cavalry charges after the introduction of modern firearms. Its success won it renown among military historians, which created a myth to the effect that for some decades 'Bredow's achievement was the norm', that cavalry could still play a decisive role in battle in a modern war between equally equipped forces, and so cavalry units continued to be part of the armed forces of major European powers for the next half century.

== See also ==
- Banzai charge
- Human wave attack
- Bayonet charge
- Highland charge
