= First Polish Army (1944–1945) =

Polish–Soviet military unit

Polish First Army
- Pierwsza Armia Wojska Polskiego
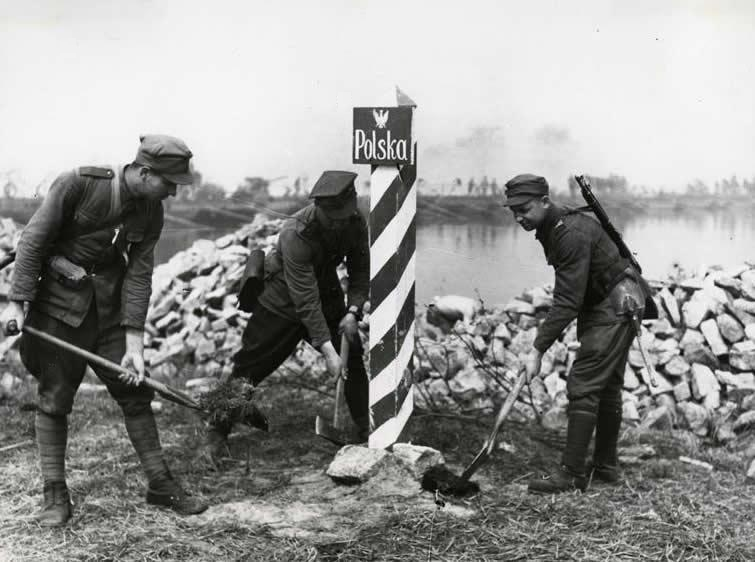
- Marking new Polish-German border on Oder River in 1945
- Active: July 1944 – August 1945
- Country: Poland
- Allegiance: Poland; Soviet Union
- Branch: Polish Armed Forces in the East
- Type: Field Army
- Engagements: World War II: Operation Bagration; Vistula–Oder Offensive; Puławy 1944; Warsaw 1944–45; Battle of Schoenfeld; Kołobrzeg 1945; Berlin 1945

Commanders
- Notable commanders: General Zygmunt Berling (1943-44); General Stanislaw Poplawski (1945)

The Polish First Army (Polish: Pierwsza Armia Wojska Polskiego, 1 AWP for short, also known as Berling's Army) was an army unit of the Polish Armed Forces in the East. It was formed in the Soviet Union in 1944, from the previously existing Polish I Corps in the Soviet Union, as part of the People's Army of Poland (LWP). The First Army fought westward, subordinated to the Soviet 1st Belorussian Front, during the offensive against Nazi Germany that led to the capture of Warsaw in January 1945 and the capture of Berlin in May 1945.

== Formation ==
The First Army was formed in the Soviet Union in 1944, from the previously existing Polish I Corps as part of the People's Army of Poland (LWP). On 10 August 1943, the Soviets gave permission for enlarging the Polish 1st Tadeusz Kościuszko Infantry Division into a Corps (Polish I Corps). The new formation was to be composed of two infantry divisions, one artillery and one armor brigade, one support and one air regiment, four independent battalions, and support units. On 29 July 1944 the Polish units were reorganized into the 1st Polish Army. From October 12 to 14, 1943, the First Polish Infantry Division made an assault on Lenino near Smolensk and sustained twenty-five percent losses. Later, the 1st Kosciuszko Infantry Division fought in Berlin around the Reich Chancellery and the Reichstag. At this stage of the war, the Polish role in the Soviet drive westward was fairly substantial, contributing 200,000 troops; this was approximately ten percent of the force taking part in Zhukov's and Konev's drive on Berlin.

== Personnel ==
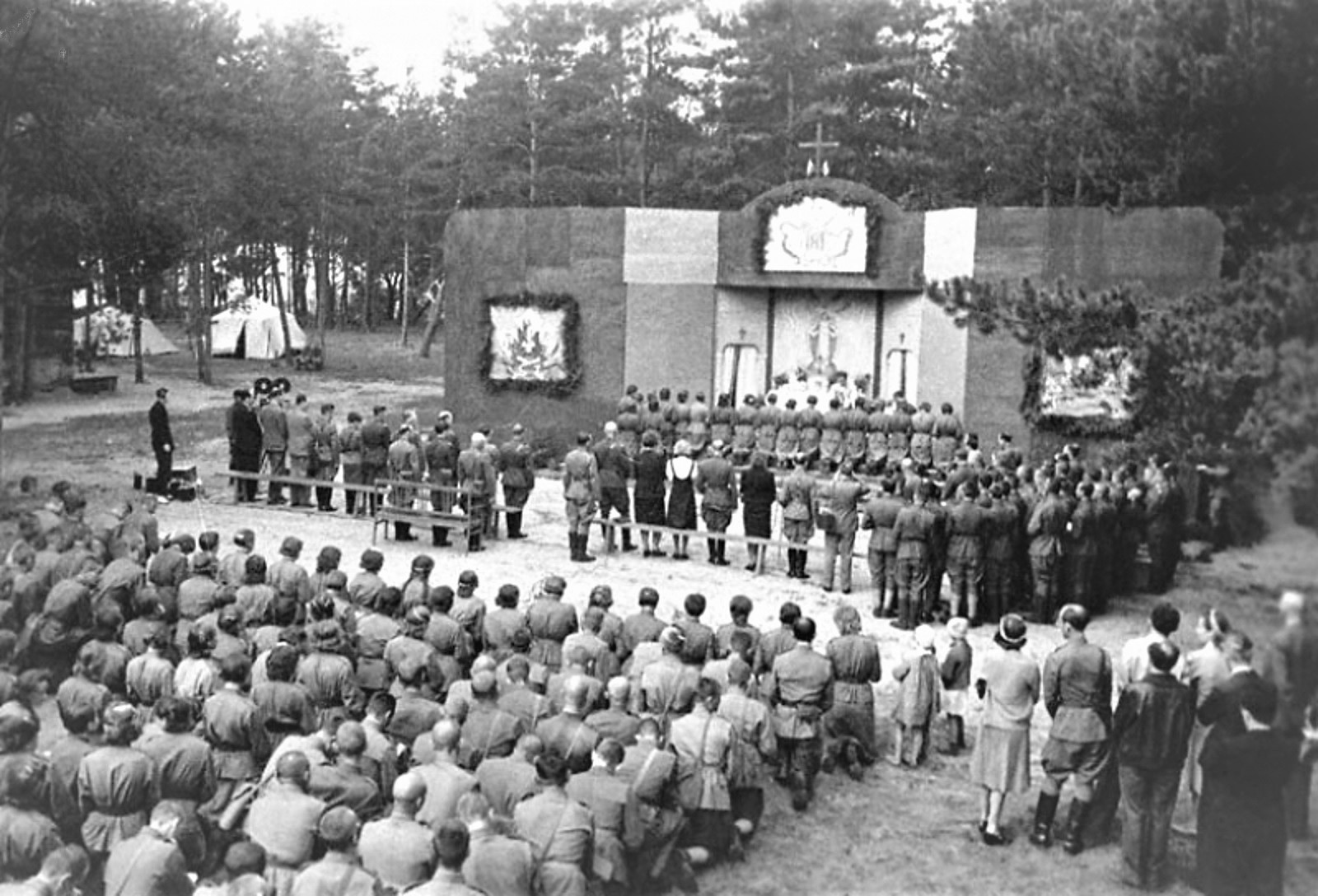
Soldiers of 1st Tadeusz Kościuszko Infantry Division at a prayer, 1943

Initially, the Polish personnel of the First Polish Army were recruited from Polish soldiers taken prisoner during the 1939 Soviet invasion of Poland (after Germany conquered western Poland), and from Poles deported from Soviet-occupied Poland in 1939–1941. They were nearly all of the First Army's front-line combat troops. However, many Soviet personnel served in the First Army, including 39% of officers and technical specialists, while for senior officers, the proportion reached 75%. As the Red Army moved into Polish areas west of the Curzon Line, draftees from those areas also became available for the First Polish Army (and Second Polish Army) in accordance with the August 15, 1944, decree of the Polish Committee of National Liberation (the Lublin government).

Until October 1944, the First Army was commanded by Lt. Gen. Zygmunt Berling. His second-in-command was Lt. Gen. Karol Świerczewski. Col. Włodzimierz Sokorski was the chief political officer. The corps took part in combat from September 1943.

== Operational history ==
Polish 1st Army route of march, 1943–1945

Operating under the auspices of the Red Army, it first entered combat in the summer of 1944 as part of the 1st Belorussian Front on the right wing of the Lvov-Sandomierz Operation, fighting in the battles during the Soviet crossing of the river Vistula around Dęblin and Puławy. In September 1944, units of the First Army were involved in heavy fighting during the latter stages of the Warsaw Uprising after crossing the river Vistula following the capture of Warsaw's eastern Praga district, but suffered heavy losses.

After eventually taking control of Warsaw in January 1945, the First Army took part in the Vistula–Oder Offensive, and afterwards it moved towards Bydgoszcz. The Polish First Army then fought in Pomerania, breaking through the Pomeranian Wall (Pommernstellung) fortified line and capturing Fortress Kolberg, a heavily fortified city, in March. Its units advanced northeast as far as Gdańsk and Kępa Oksywska. During the battles to penetrate the Pomeranian fortifications, the 1st "Warsaw" Cavalry Brigade made the last mounted charge of Polish cavalry at the village of Schoenfeld.

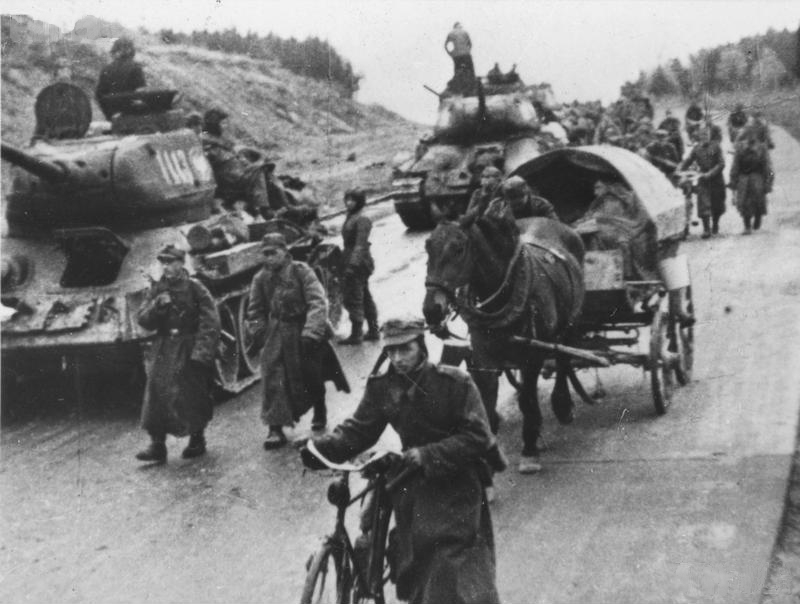
The Polish First Army on their way to Berlin, 1945

In the spring of 1945 the army, now numbering 78,556 soldiers, was redeployed to the front on the Oder river in preparation for the final Soviet offensive of the war in Europe. The Polish Second Army also entered the line of battle at this time, and together the two armies contributed about 10% of the total forces involved in the operation. During the offensive it crossed the river on April 16 and joined the Battle of Berlin. In this, among other actions, Polish units of the 1st Army crossed the Hohenzollern Canal and advanced on Kremmen, Flatow, Paaren and Nauen. They ended their campaign by participating in the Battle of Berlin. In the Berlin Offensive, the First Polish Army's strength was over 74,000, thus making up 7.5% of the strength of the Soviet 1st Belorussian Front, which counted over 980,000 men when the Polish First Army is included in the total. During the Berlin Offensive, the Polish First Army sustained casualties of over 10,400 men. The troops of the 1st Infantry Division supported by the 2nd Howitzer Artillery Brigade and the 1st Independent Mortar Brigade, fought in Berlin around the Technical University and the southwestern side of the Tiergarten close to the Berlin Zoo.

The army was disbanded after the war on August 22, 1945. Its constituent units went on to serve in the armed forces of the newly created Polish People's Republic.

== Organization ==
The 1st Polish Army was very similar in organisation to other standard general purpose armies making up the bulk of Red Army's order of battle. It had a good mix of infantry units and artillery together with other support arms. Its armor capability was considerably weaker, and consisted of only one organic tank brigade. In manpower it was broadly equivalent to an American infantry corps, having a strength of 74,530 men on May 1, 1945. At the end of the war in 1945, it consisted of the following large units (honorific names given in brackets)

Organization as of May 1, 1945

- 1st Infantry Division (Tadeusz Kościuszko)
- 2nd Infantry Division (Jan Henryk Dąbrowski)
- 3rd Infantry Division (Romuald Traugutt)
- 4th Infantry Division (Jan Kiliński)
- 6th Infantry Division
- 1st Armoured Brigade (Heroes of Westerplatte) – often detached and operating independently
- 1st Cavalry Brigade
- 1st Gun Artillery Brigade (Józef Bem)
- 2nd Howitzer Artillery Brigade
- 3rd Army Artillery Brigade
- 5th Heavy Artillery Brigade
- 13th Self-Propelled Artillery Regiment (operating SU-85 and ISU-152)
- 1st Anti-aircraft Artillery Division
- 4th Antitank Artillery Brigade
- 1st Sapper Brigade
- 2nd Sapper Brigade
- 1st Mortar Brigade (attached from High Command Reserve)

== See also ==
- Second Army (Poland)
- Monument to the Soldiers of the First Polish Army
- Polish Armed Forces in the East
- Polish Armed Forces in the West
- Emilia Plater Independent Women's Battalion
- Four Tank-Men and a Dog - TV series

== Sources ==
- Czesław Grzelak and others, Armia Berlinga i Żymierskiego, Warszawa: Wydawnictwo Neriton, 2002.
- G. F. Krivosheev, Soviet casualties and combat losses in the Twentieth Century, London: Greenhill Books, 1997.
- Steven J. Zaloga, The Polish Army 1939–45, Oxford: Osprey, 1998.
