= Seltsy, Ryazan Oblast =

Village in Ryazan Oblast, Russia

Seltsy Сельцы
- Rural locality
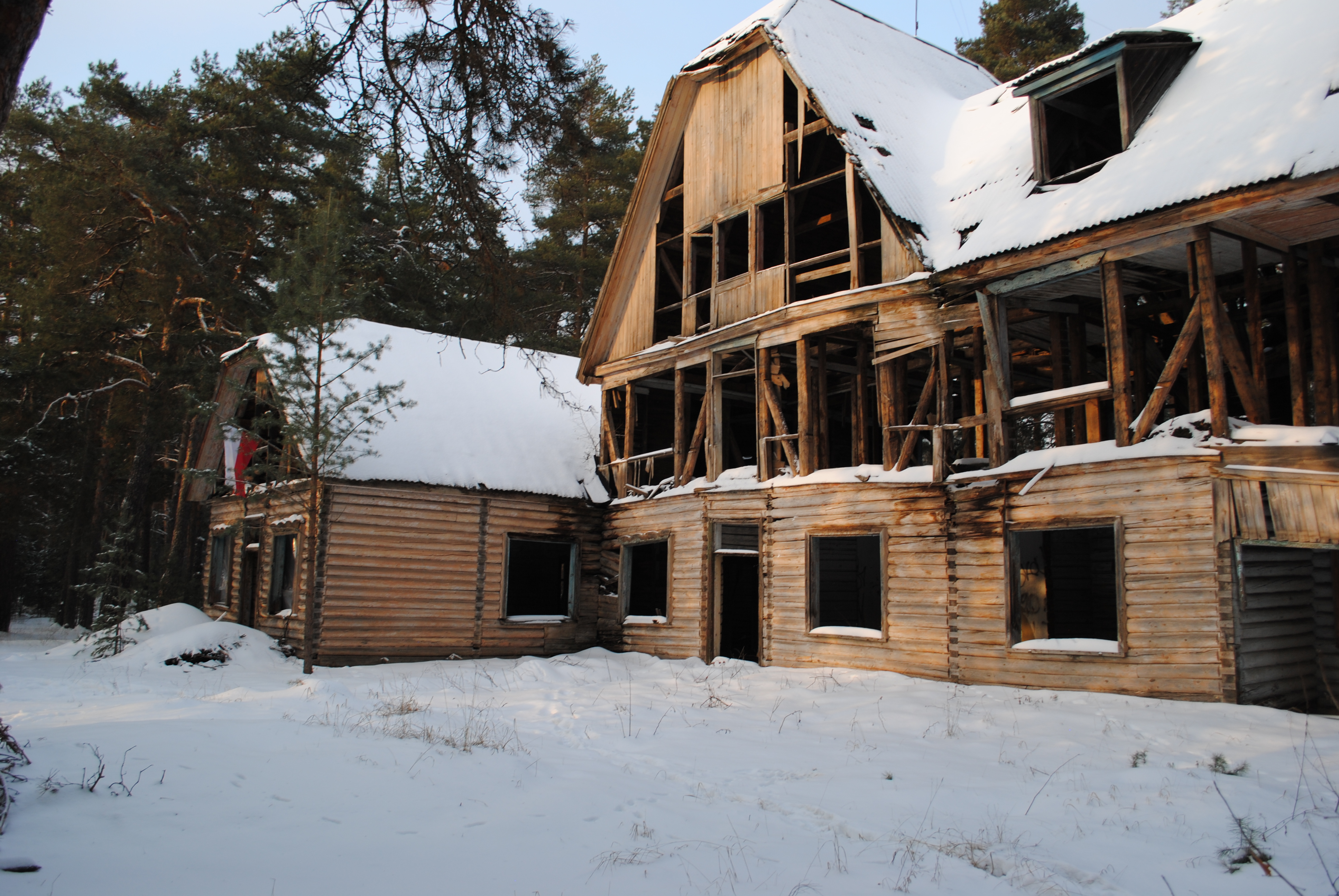
- Former staff of the Polish 1st Tadeusz Kościuszko Infantry Division
- Interactive map of Seltsy
- Location of Seltsy Seltsy (European Russia) Seltsy (Russia)
- Coordinates: 54°54′39.73″N 39°30′45.63″E
- Country: Russia
- Federal subject: Ryazan Oblast

Population
  - Estimate (2013): 431 )
- Time zone: UTC+3 (MSK)
- Postal code: 391101
- OKTMO ID: 61627460101

Seltsy (Russian: Сельцы; Polish: Sielce) is a rural locality (a selo) in Rybnovsky District of Ryazan Oblast, Russia, located on the Oka River, north-west of Ryazan.

== History ==
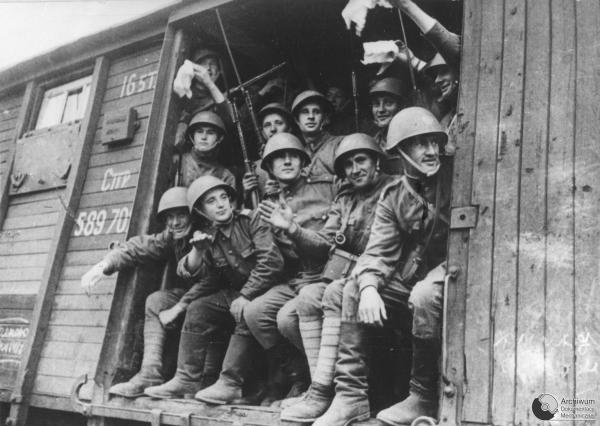
Polish 1st Tadeusz Kościuszko Infantry Division departing Seltsy in 1943

During World War II, three divisions and some other units of the Polish Army were formed in the village before joining the fight against Nazi Germany. The 1st Tadeusz Kościuszko Infantry Division was formed in May 1943, and then joined the fight against Germany in September 1943. Then the 2nd Jan Henryk Dąbrowski Infantry Division and other units of the 1st Corps of the Polish Armed Forces were formed, and relocated to Laptevo near Smolensk in January 1944. From December 1943, the 3rd Romuald Traugutt Infantry Division was formed, and relocated to Kiwerce in March 1944. In early 1944, the 1st Reserve Infantry Regiment of the 1st Corps was relocated to Sumy in Ukraine, which became the main center for the formation of the First Polish Army.
