= 1st Tadeusz Kościuszko Infantry Division =

- 1 Polska Dywizja Piechoty im. Tadeusza Kościuszki
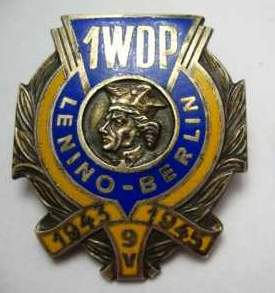
- Divisional insignia
- Active: May 1943 – 1955
- Country: Poland
- Patron: Tadeusz Kościuszko
- Engagements: World War II: Battle of Lenino; Battle of Berlin; Cold War

Commanders
- Notable commanders: Zygmunt Berling

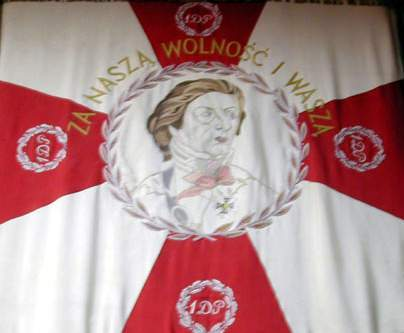
Divisional standard

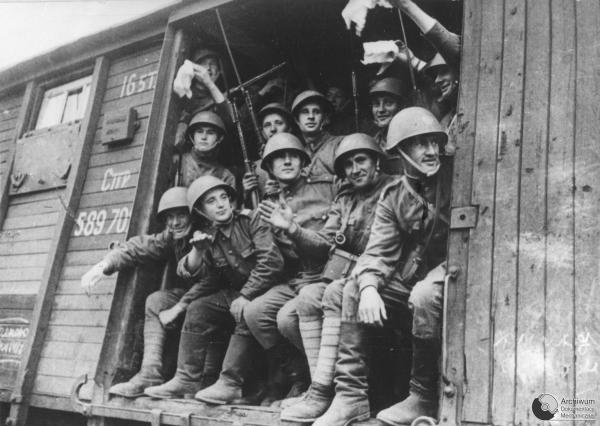
Troops of the Polish 1st Division in 1943

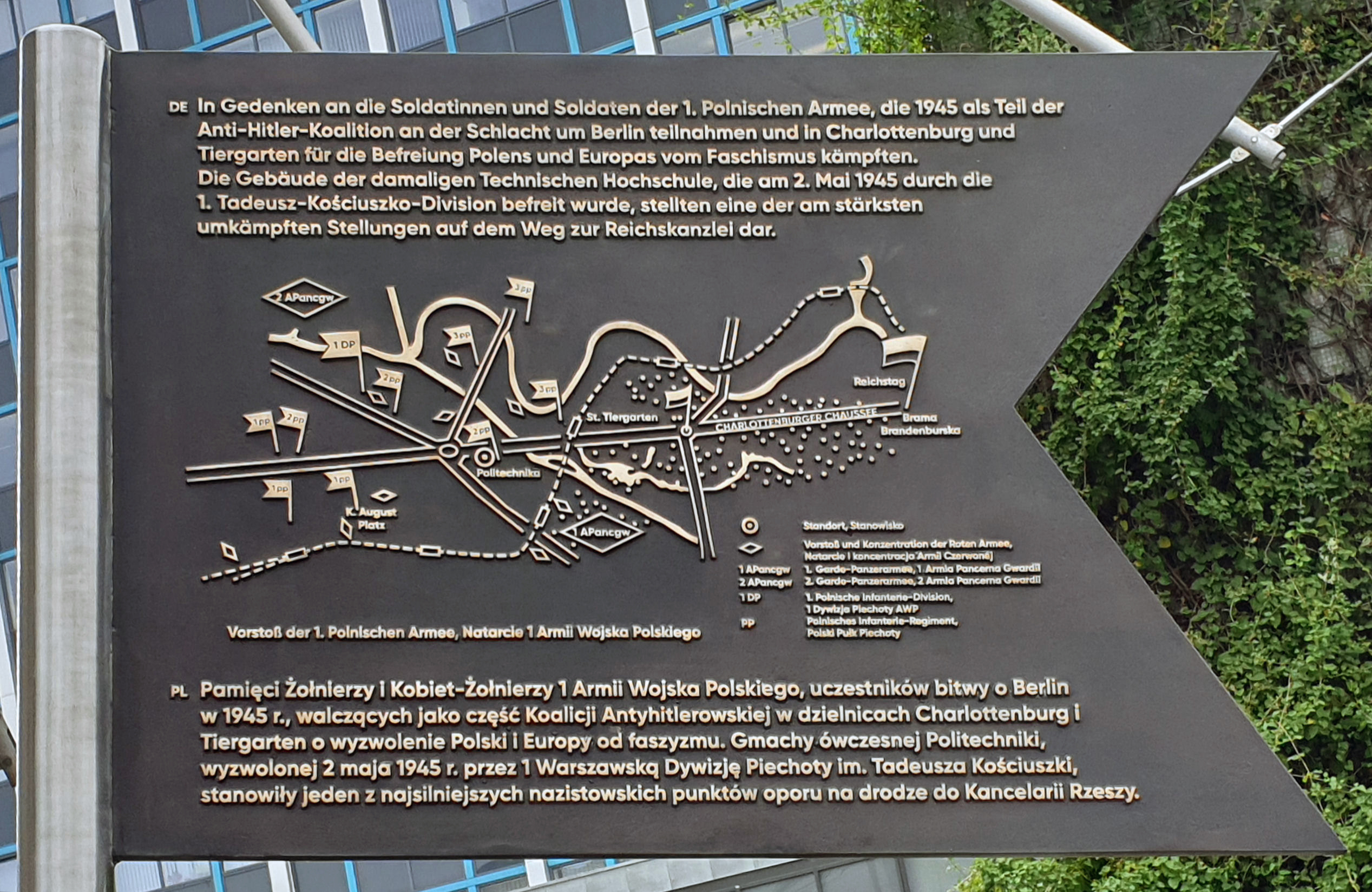
A plaque commemorating the First Polish Army in Berlin-Charlottenburg

The Polish 1st Tadeusz Kościuszko Infantry Division (Polish: 1 Polska Dywizja Piechoty im. Tadeusza Kościuszki) was an infantry division in the Polish armed forces formed in 1943 and named for the Polish and American revolutionary Tadeusz Kościuszko. Formed in the Soviet Union, it was the first division of the First Army (Berling Army), and of what later became the post-war Polish Armed Forces (Ludowe Wojsko Polskie) after Invasion of Poland in 1939 and defeating the Nazi Germany in 1945. It was considered part of Polish Armed Forces in the East.

== Formation ==
An infantry division, it was formed in May 1943 in a small village Seltsy, Ryazan Region of Russia (near the Oka River), under the command of general Zygmunt Berling. It was organised according to the Shtat (Table of Organisation and Equipment) of a Red Army Guards Rifle Division, with minor amendments. In accordance with a decision of Joseph Stalin, Col. Zygmunt Berling took over the command of the division. Political control of the division was held by the Union of Polish Patriots. On July 15, 1943, the anniversary of the Battle of Grunwald, the soldiers of the division took the military oath. The oath sworn obligated, amongst other things Confidentiality of fidelity to the alliance to the Soviet Union and adherence to the brotherhood of arms [of the] allied Red Army. In late August shortages still existed – 20% of the standard complement of officers were missing and 36% of NCOs.

When the division started being organised, there were many Jewish volunteers, but they stopped accepting any more Jews, according to Azriel Eiseneberg:

"so as to not become propaganda targets of the London Government-in-exile which might be tempted to revive the old story of the connection between Communism and the Jews."

According to Krystyna Kersten, Prime Minister General Sikorski declared Berling's army a communist Polish division, subversive, and its commander a traitor, a deserter from the Polish Army.

On July 7, 1943 the Polish military attaché to the United States, Colonel Vladimir Onacewicz, issued a statement in which he wrote that the division does not belong to the Polish Army and is a Red Army Division under the command of the Soviet authorities.

== Frontline service ==
The division was ready for operations on July 15, 1943. Its first engagement took place on October 12, 1943 at the battle of Lenino. The 33rd Army commander Gen. Gordov asked the division to break the German defense, in the section Polzukhi, and then move in the direction of Łosiewa and Czurniłowa. From October 12 to 14, 1943, sustained twenty-five percent losses. After the battle the division regrouped in the Smolensk region, where further training took place.

By March 1944 the division had been expanded into the basis of the 1st Polish Army Corps, part of the Western Front. As part of the 1st Polish Army Corps, the division was in the vicinity of Zhytomyr and Berdichev. According to a Directive of April 29, 1944, it was part of the structure of the Belarusian Front. In the following days with the troops, Division marched in a westerly direction, and on July 23, 1944 crossed the river Bug. After a march lasting from July 15 to 27, 1944, the division reached the boundary of the Vistula and on August 2, 1944 made an attempt to capture a foothold in the Deblin region.

In subsequent days, the division was regrouped to the north and on August 26, 1944 continued battles on the Vistula River in the area between the rivers Wilga and Świder. On September 5, 1944 the division was temporarily reassigned from the First Army commander and resubordinated to the 47th Army. Between September 10–15, 1944 bloody battles were fought for the liberation of Praga. There is a memorial to this in the same area built in the 1980s.

Later, the division fought in the Battle of Berlin around the Reich Chancellery and the Reichstag.

Poland's official Flag Day is held each year on 2 May, the last day of the battle in Berlin, when the Polish Army hoisted its flag on the Berlin Victory Column.

Components:

- 1 Praski Pułk Piechoty (1st Infantry Regiment)
- 2 Berliński Pułk Piechoty (2nd Infantry Regiment)
- 3 Berliński Pułk Piechoty (3rd Infantry Regiment)
- 1 Berliński Pułk Artylerii Lekkiej (1st Light Artillery Regiment)
- support units

For participation in the war, the division was awarded the Golden Cross of the Order of Virtuti Militari.

== Postwar ==
In 1955 it was reorganized into the 1st "Warsaw" Mechanised Division. The 1st Warsaw Mechanised Division was part of the Warsaw Military District from 1955–1998. In the mid-1990s mechanized regiments of the division were reorganised as brigades. In 2001 the division was subordinated to the commander of the 2nd Mechanised Corps and its components included three Mechanised Brigade and 21 Podhale Rifle Brigade. In 2004 the division was subordinated directly to the Land Forces Command. It was disbanded on September 1, 2011.

== Maps of the engagements ==
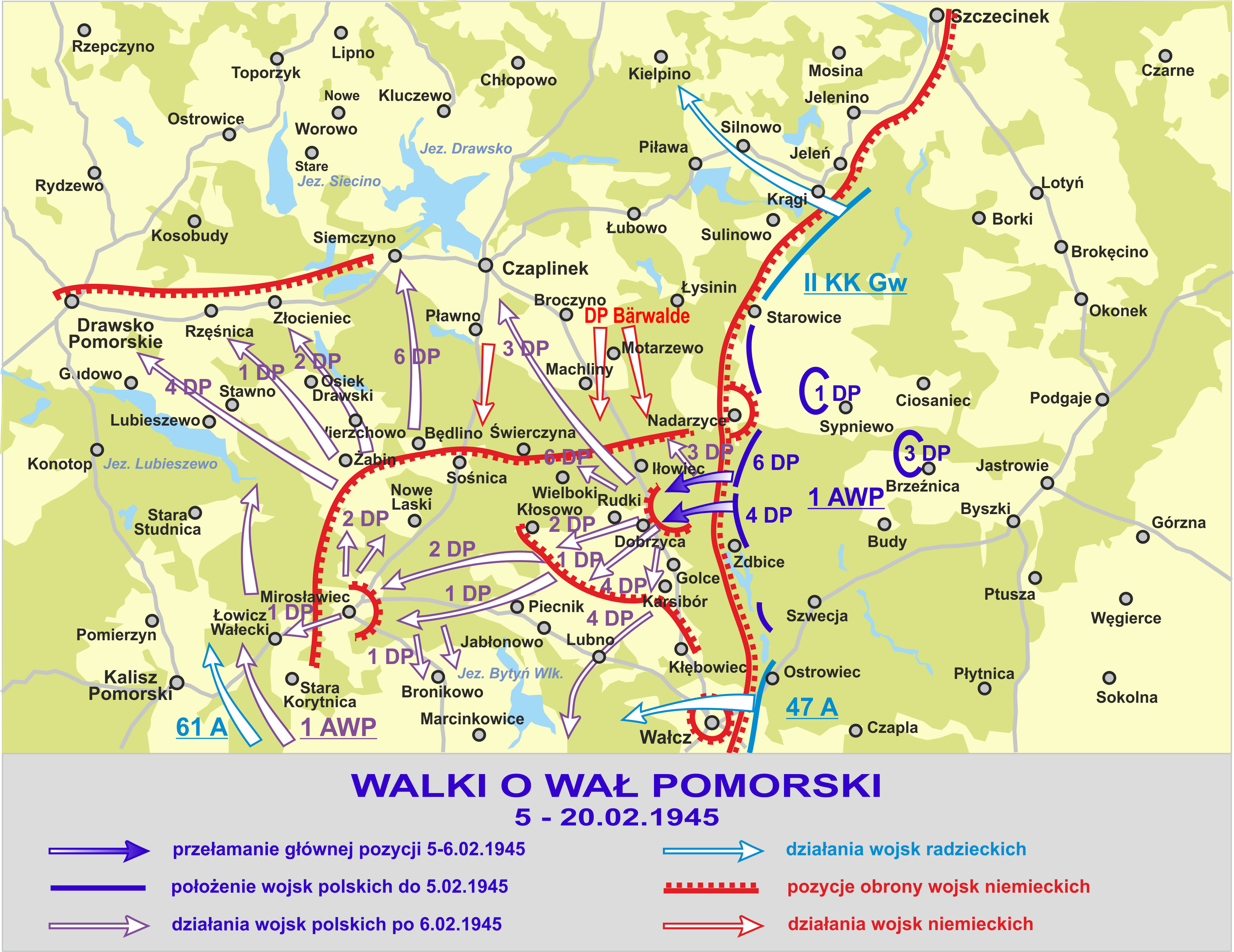

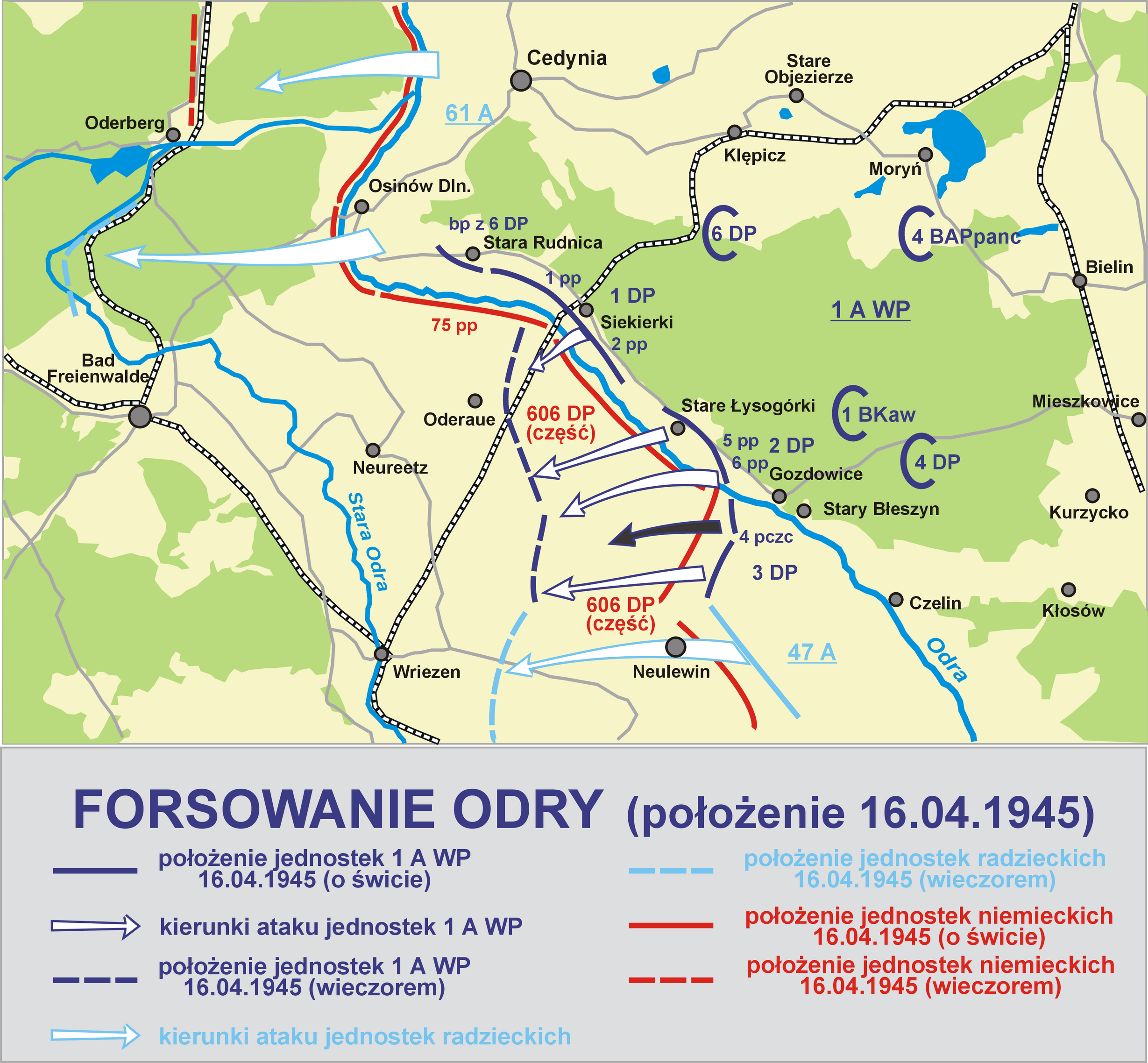

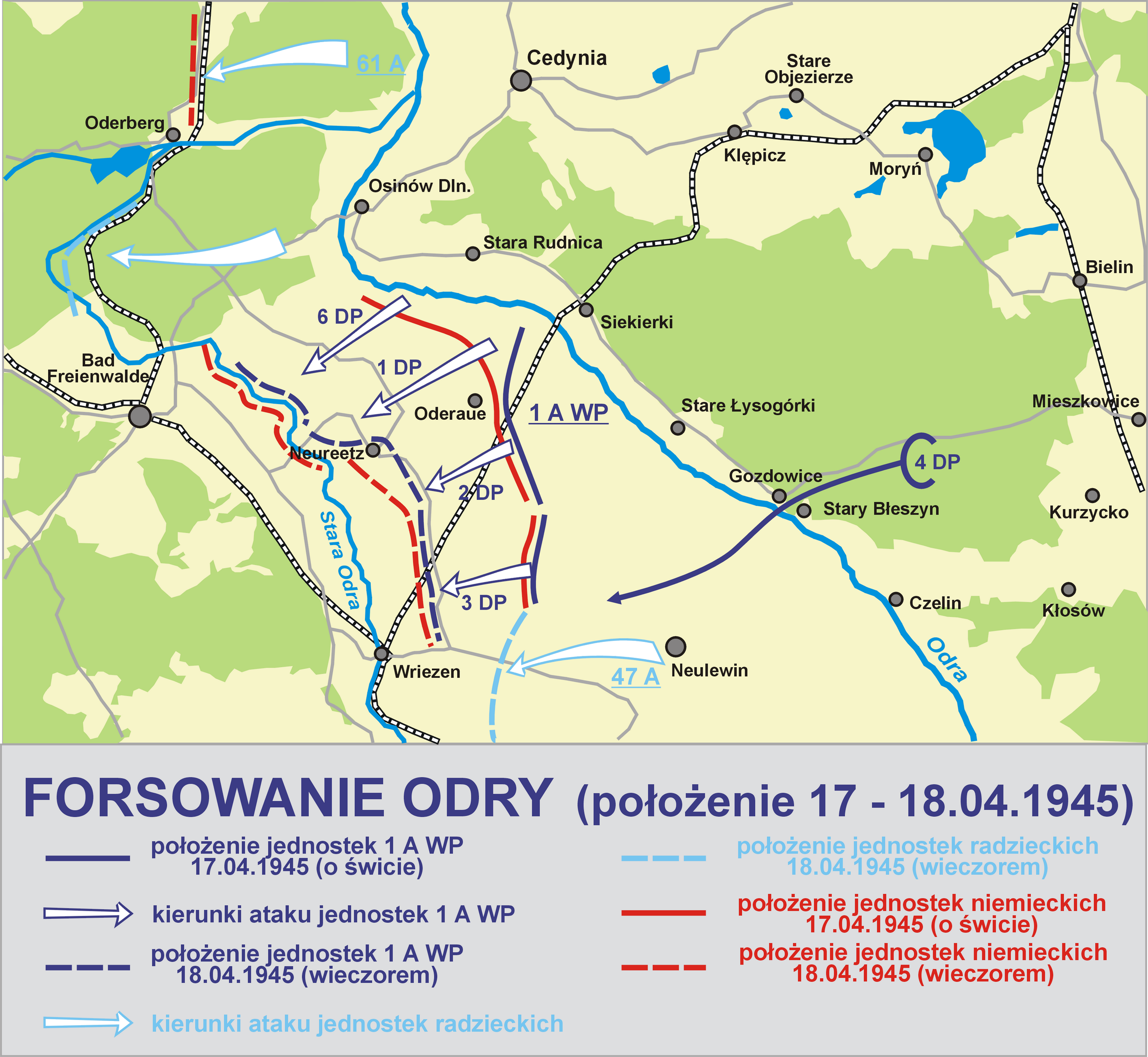

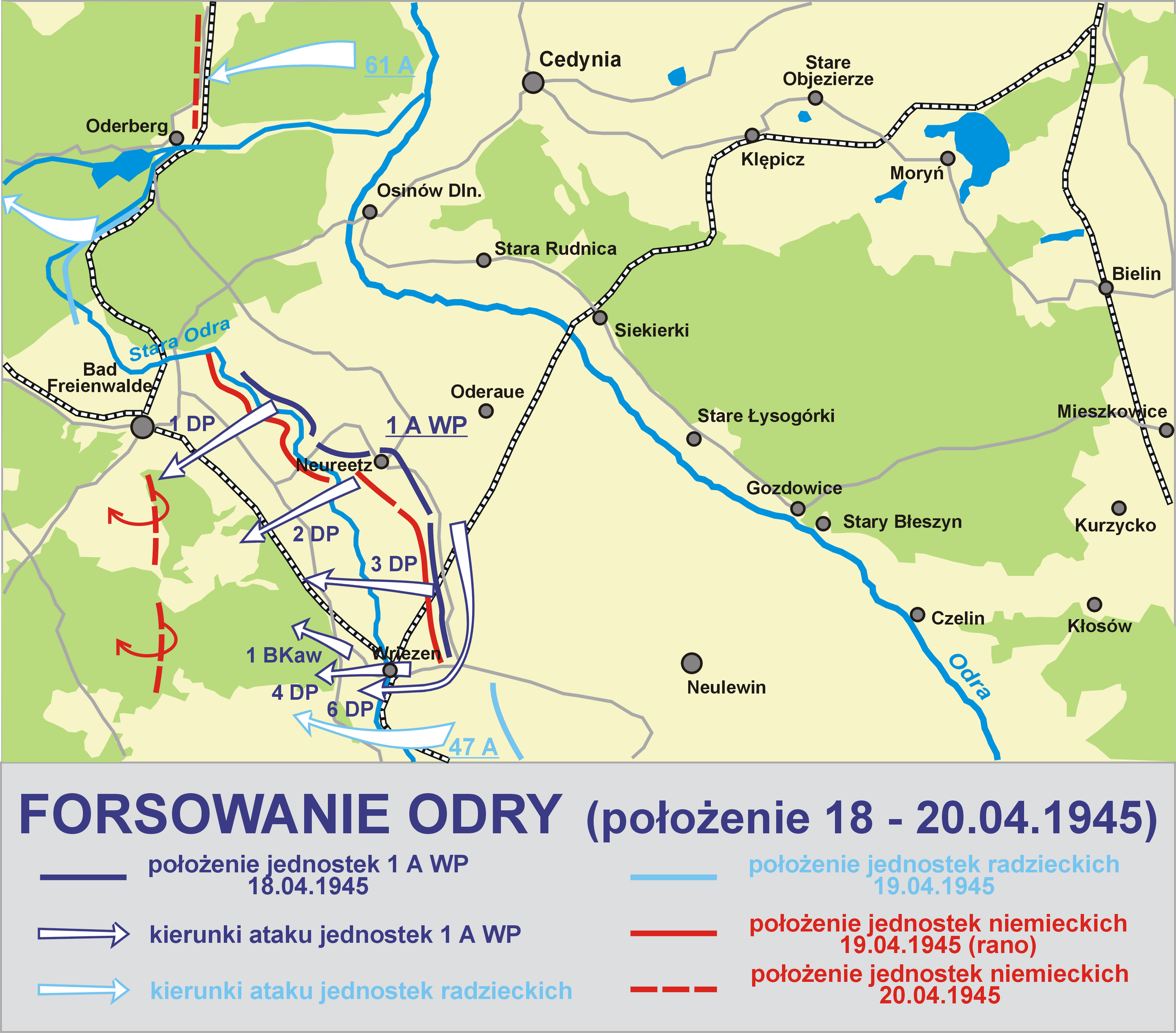

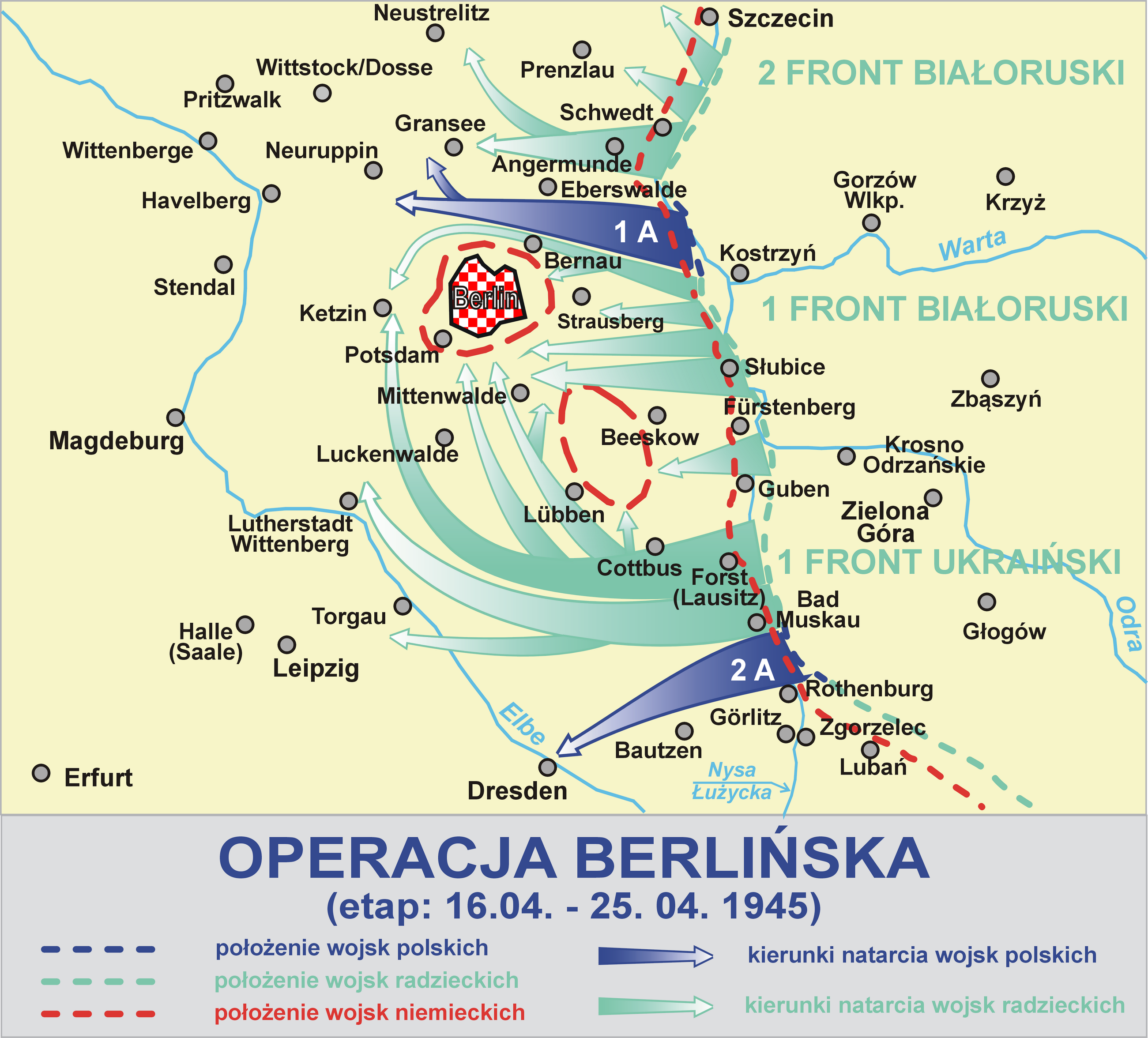

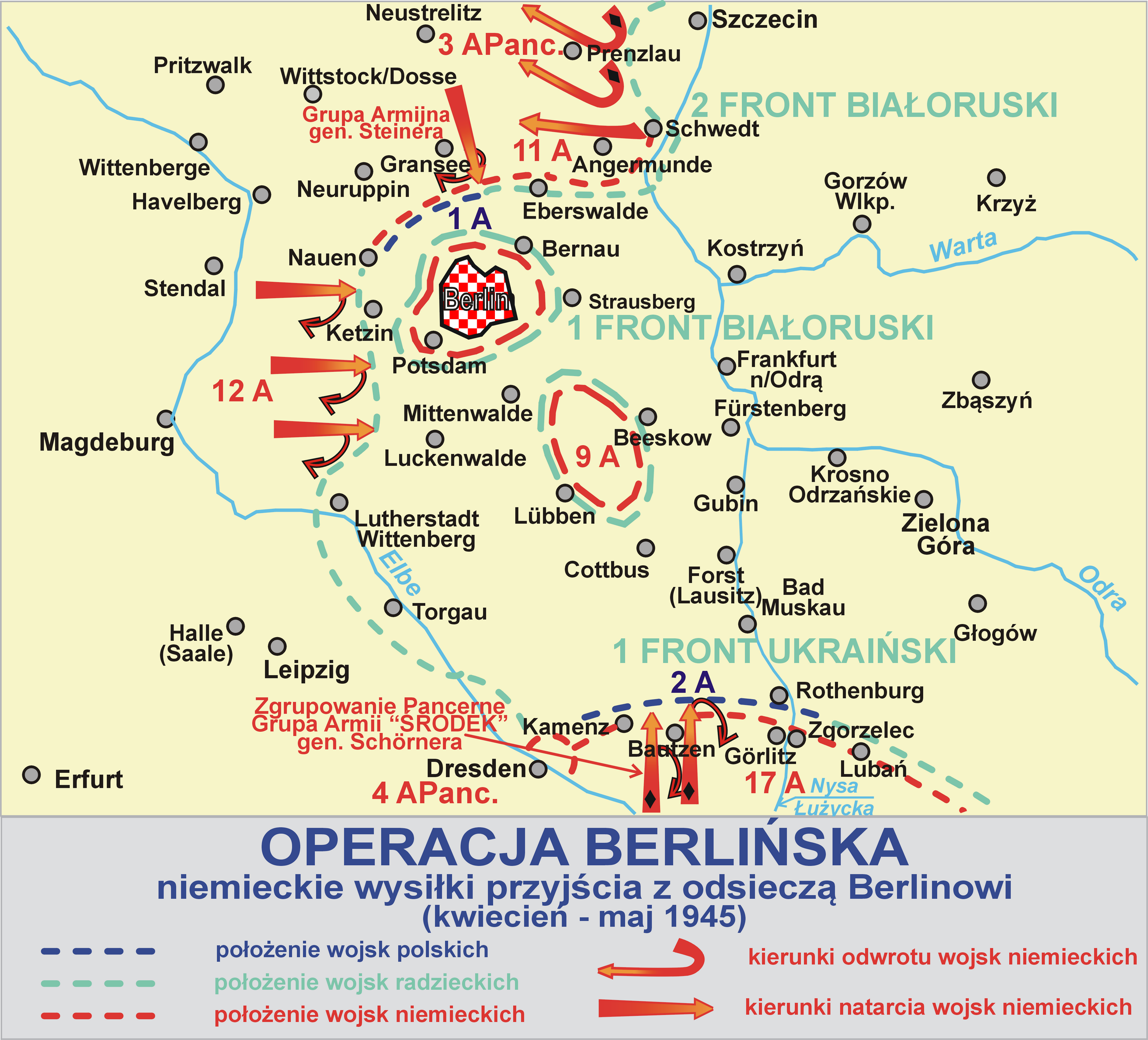

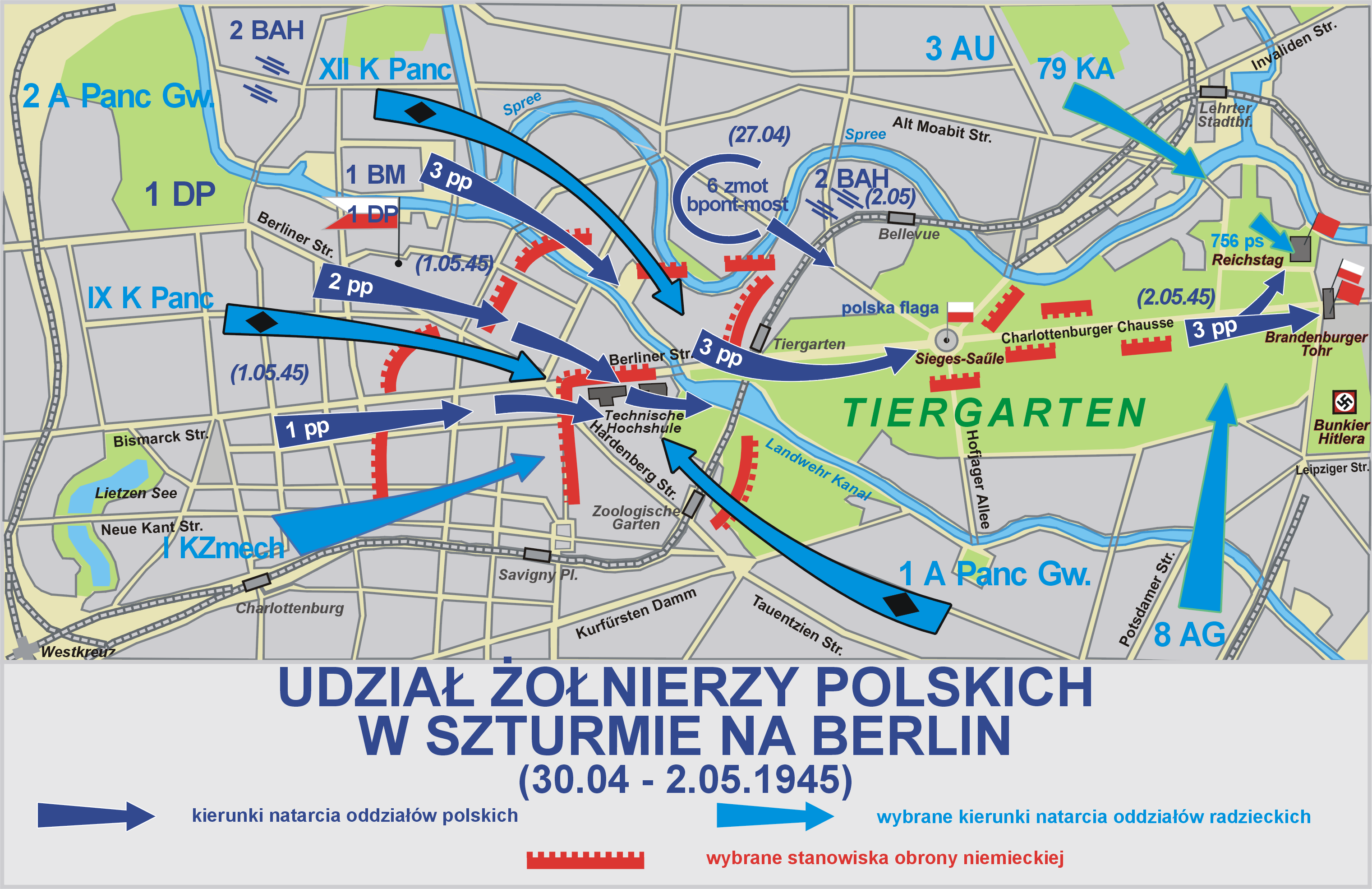

== Bibliography ==
- Stanisław Komornicki: Wojsko Polskie : krótki informator historyczny o Wojsku Polskim w latach II wojny światowej. Cz.1, Regularne jednostki ludowego Wojska Polskiego : formowanie, działania bojowe, organizacja, uzbrojenie, metryki jednostek piechoty. Warszawa : Wydawnictwo Ministerstwa Obrony Narodowej (Ministry of National Defence) Warszawa 1965
- Glantz, D.M., Soviet Military Deception in the Second World War, Frank Cass, London (1989). ISBN 0-7146-3347-X.
- Kutylowski, Denny (November 21, 2011), Polish Holidays, Polish Toledo, archived from the original on September 15, 2019

== See also ==
- Kościuszko Infantry Division Memorial
- List of military units named after people
