= 73rd Rifle Corps =

73rd Silesia Rifle Corps 21st Silesia Rifle Corps
- Active: July 1943–August 1957
- Country: Soviet Union
- Branch: Red Army (Soviet Army from 1946)
- Type: Infantry (Rifle corps)
- Engagements: World War II; Soviet counterinsurgency in western Ukraine
- Honorifics: Silesia

Commanders
- Notable commanders: Pavel Batitsky; Sarkis Martirosyan

The 73rd Silesia Rifle Corps (Russian: 73-й стрелковый Силезский корпус) was a rifle corps of the Red Army during World War II.

== World War II ==
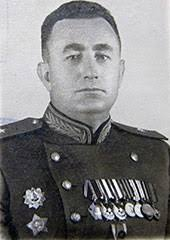
General-mayor Pavel Batitsky commanded the corps between its formation and April 1944

The corps headquarters was formed on 8 July 1943 at Kuzhenkino, Leningrad Oblast, part of the 52nd Army, with which it served for the rest of the war. The 254th, 294th, and 136th Rifle Divisions, then in the Reserve of the Supreme High Command were assigned to the corps. Colonel Pavel Batitsky of the 254th Rifle Division was appointed corps commander. After the assignment of its divisions, the corps was loaded into railway echelons for relocation to the Steppe Front and on 1 August concentrated at the village of Petrovka, west of Voronezh, where it continued its formation. Corps units continued to arrive through August, with its assigned 976th Separate Signal Battalion joining the corps on 11 August and the headquarters battery of the corps artillery commander and commandant's platoon joining on 23 August. That month, the corps finished its formation and as part of the 52nd Army joined the Voronezh Front. By the end of its formation, the corps headquarters was at Petrovka, the 254th at Nizhnyaya Veduga, the 294th at Khokhol and Verkhneye Turovo, and the 136th at Dolgoye and Kazinka. Between 8 and 18 August the corps marched 315 kilometers to concentrate in the vicinity of Martynovka, Mikhaylovka, Zalomnoye, Storozhevoye, Vesyoly, Zamostye, Bondarevka, and Pushkarnoye near Sudzha in Kursk Oblast. In its concentration area the corps conducted training in preparation for the forthcoming Chernigov–Poltava Strategic Offensive.

The corps began an offensive against the town of Zenkov on 4 September and captured the town two days later. The 294th Rifle Division was transferred out of the corps on 6 September and replaced by the 93rd Rifle Division. On 17 September the 136th left the corps and the 294th returned. Between 24 and 26 September the 166th Rifle Division in the vicinity of Novoavromovo was operationally subordinated to the corps. Between 4 and 30 September, the corps liberated 130 settlements, including the towns of Zenkov and Mirgorod, reached the Dnieper and forced a crossing of it in the vicinity of Bubnovskaya Slobodka. For the taking of Mirgorod the 93rd Rifle Division was awarded the name of the town as an honorific.

On 20 October the 93rd Rifle Division left the corps. On 5 December the 7th Guards Airborne Division became part of the corps, replacing the 93rd. The corps liberated the city of Cherkassy on 14 December. The 254th, 294th, and 7th Guards were received the Cherkassy honorific in recognition of their performance in the liberation of that city. On 16 December the 62nd Guards Rifle Division joined the corps and the 254th and 294th were transferred out. On 4 January 1944 the 254th returned to the corps, and between 4 January and 18 February the corps took part in the Korsun–Shevchenkovsky Offensive. During the offensive, the 31st Rifle Division joined the corps on 12 January. The corps forced a crossing of the Dniester in the vicinity of Mikhaylovka and Yaruga on 22 March. Four days later, the corps, pursuing retreating German units on the territory of Moldavia and Bessarabia, reached the Soviet–Romanian border. Forcing a crossing of the Prut in the vicinity of Skuliany the corps joined battle with German troops north of Jassy. Between 1 April and 19 August the corps was involved in fierce defensive battles near Jassy (the First Jassy–Kishinev offensive) and prepared for the Second Jassy–Kishinev offensive. On 12 April the 50th Rifle Division joined the corps. That month, General-mayor Sarkis Martirosyan took command of the corps, switching commands with Batitsky.

On 20 August the 373rd Rifle Division joined the corps. That day, the division attacked as part of the Second Jassy–Kishinev offensive, driving towards Jassy. The corps took Jassy on the next day, and Huși on 24 August. Between 24 and 30 August the corps eliminated the German Jassy–Kishinev grouping to the southeast of Huși.

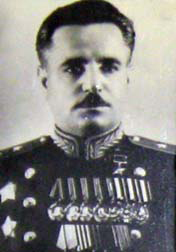
General-mayor Sarkis Martirosyan commanded the corps from April 1944 to the end of the war

With the 52nd Army, the corps was transferred by rail from the vicinity of Jassy to Vladimir-Volynsky in western Ukraine beginning on 15 October to join the 1st Ukrainian Front. Completing the transfer, on 29 October, the corps concentrated in the vicinity of Nisko, Jeżowe, Kopki, and Rudnik in Poland. In this region, the 73rd received replacements, new equipment, and conducted combat training. On 24 December the corps and the 52nd Army arrived at the Sandomierz bridgehead and concentrated in the vicinity of Staszów and began training for the penetration of the German defenses in the vicinity of Szydłów in the forthcoming Sandomierz–Silesian offensive. At the start of the offensive on 12 January the corps, with the 50th, 254th and 294th Divisions, broke through German line near Szydłów and to the north of Nowy Solec. On 13 January the corps took Chmielnik, forced a crossing of the Nida on 14 January, took Radomsko on 17 January, forced a crossing of the Warta and took Wieluń on 19 January. On 20 January 1945 the 214th Rifle Division joined the corps. Crossing the German border on 21 January, the corps captured Oels on 25 January and on the next day fought its way to Breslau, joining battle for the eastern outskirts of the city. The corps forced a crossing of the Oder on 27 January. Between 27 January and 18 February the corps fought in intense fighting for Breslau. On 2 February the 77th Fortified Region was operationally subordinated to the corps. The corps received the Silesia honorific on 19 February 1945 in recognition of its performance during the Sandomierz–Silesian offensive, and Martirosyan was made a Hero of the Soviet Union for his leadership.

The corps, having left behind the 294th to take part in the Siege of Breslau, was relocated to the vicinity of Bunzlau on 19 February, where until 13 April it took part in difficult fighting with counterattacking German troops, improving its positions in the course of the battles. On 17 April the 213th Rifle Division joined the corps as the Berlin Offensive began. With the 254th, 50th, 213th Divisions the corps broke through the German defense on the Neisse that day, forced a crossing of the Neisse and fought for Görlitz. The corps captured Niesky on 23 April. On 1 May the 116th Rifle Division joined the corps. With the 50th, 116th, and 254th Divisions the corps continued the rapid offensive towards Czechoslovakia from 1 May and on 8 May captured Reichenbach during the Prague offensive. On 9 May, Victory Day, the corps took Zittau and Mladá Boleslav. Germany surrendered on 9 May, but German troops under Ferdinand Schörner continued to resist Soviet troops. As a result, on 10 May, the corps joined battle for Prague. On 13 May German resistance sharply weakened and the resistance of small group of German troops was finally broken. The corps halted in the vicinity of Mladá Boleslav at the end of the war.

For their actions during the war, 28,371 enlisted men and 8,156 officers of the corps were decorated. These awards included seventeen Orders of Lenin, 695 Orders of the Red Banner, seven Orders of Suvorov, 2nd class, eleven Orders of Suvorov, 3rd class, five Orders of Kutuzov, 2nd class, thirteen Orders of Kutuzov, 3rd class, 153 Orders of Alexander Nevsky, 1,240 Orders of the Patriotic War, 1st class, 9,519 Orders of the Patriotic War 2nd class, and 9,329 Orders of Glory of all classes.

== Postwar ==
When the war ended, the corps included the 50th, 116th, and 254th Rifle Divisions. In the weeks following the end of the war. the corps settled into a peacetime routine of combat and political training. After the end of the war, the corps was withdrawn to the Lvov Military District together with the 52nd Army, arriving on 23 July 1945, with its headquarters at Stryy. The 50th Rifle Division was stationed at Dobromil, Khyrov, Nove Myasto, and Ustriki Dolyny, the 116th at Sambor, Stary Sambor, and Turka, and the 254th at Stryy, Drogobych, and Morshin. There the corps was brought up to strength, conducted combat training and took part in operations against the Ukrainian Insurgent Army.

The corps transitioned to peacetime tables of organization and equipment (TO&E) on 10 March 1946. After being brought up to strength and the transition to peacetime TO&E the corps received new support units: the 338th Corps Artillery Brigade, 83rd Guards Mortar Regiment, 341st Separate Anti-Aircraft Artillery Battalion, 252nd Separate Guards Tank Battalion, 920th Separate Corps Sapper Battalion, 87th Separate Tank Repair Company, and 422nd Mobile Auto Repair Base. During the same reorganization the 254th Rifle Division was reorganized as the 27th Mechanized Division, and the 116th Rifle Division disbanded, with its personnel and equipment split among the 50th and 27th Divisions and other 52nd Army units. The 24th Rifle Division joined the corps by 28 May to replace the disbanded 116th. By that date, the corps support units were the 2053rd Corps Artillery Regiment, 83rd Guards Mortar Regiment, 920th Separate Corps Sapper Battalion, 976th Separate Signal Battalion, 87th Tank Repair Company, and the 422nd Mobile Auto Repair Base. With the disbandment of the 52nd Army it became part of the 38th Army of the Carpathian Military District, headquartered at Drogobych, in June 1946. During conventional force reductions of the Red Army, the 50th Rifle Division was disbanded by an order of the 38th Army dated 15 May 1947, leaving the corps with the 24th Rifle and 27th Mechanized Divisions for the rest of its existence.

In February 1948 the 920th Separate Sapper Battalion was reduced to the 238th Separate Sapper Company with an authorized strength of 69 men with surplus personnel transferred to sapper units of the corps' divisions. Similarly, the 83rd Guards Mortar Regiment was reduced to the 145th Separate Guards Mortar Battalion with an authorized strength of 202, and surplus personnel transferred to the 2053rd Corps Artillery Regiment. Between November and March 1949 the corps formed the 776th Corps Anti-Aircraft Artillery Battalion at Drogobych with an authorized strength of 186 using personnel from other units of the corps.

New TO&Es introduced on 15 November 1949 set the authorized strength of the corps headquarters at 155 men, that of the signal battalion at 421 men, and that of the artillery commander headquarters battery at 88 men. Under the same reorganization the sapper company was expanded to battalion strength again, authorized 321 men based at Borislav, and the 28th Separate Corps Destroyer Anti-Tank Artillery Battalion (247 men) at Sambor formed. The enlisted men and non-commissioned officers of the battalion included 60 transferred from the corps' divisions and 152 conscripts of the 1929 class born in the Moscow Military District. Under the 1949 reorganization the 338th Artillery Brigade was reformed with brigade headquarters (126 men) at Sambor, the 2044th Gun Artillery Regiment (404 men) at Stary Sambor formed from the gun battalion of the 2053rd Artillery Regiment, the 2053rd Howitzer Artillery Regiment (404 men) at Sambor from the howitzer battalion of the 2053rd Artillery Regiment (inheriting the latter's lineage), and the 695th Separate Artillery Reconnaissance Battalion (146 men) at Stary Sambor from the reconnaissance battalion of the 2053rd. The 24th Rifle Division was reorganized with an authorized strength of 11,200 men and the 27th Mechanized Division with an authorized strength of 9,411 men.

The 87th Separate Tank Repair Company (54 men) was disbanded on 1 September 1952 and its personnel equipment transferred to the newly formed tank repair workshop of the 24th Rifle Division. The 422nd Field Auto Repair Base was. disbanded on 30 December 1952, with its troops and equipment transferred to other corps units.

The corps was renumbered as the 21st Rifle Corps on 13 June 1955. The corps headquarters was disbanded in mid-1957 when most Soviet Army corps headquarters were removed from the force structure.

== Commanders ==
The following officers commanded the corps:

- Colonel Pavel Batitsky (20 July 1943–24 April 1944, promoted general-mayor 25 September 1943)
- General-mayor Sarkis Martirosyan (25 April 1944–July 1945, promoted general-leytenant 27 June 1945)
- Colonel Vasily Ivanovich Shuba (acting, July 1945–January 1946)
- General-mayor Georgy Latyshev (30 January–7 June 1946)
- General-leytenant Aleksey Grechkin (7 June–July 1946)
- General-mayor Aleksandr Akimov (July 1946–June 1948)
- General-mayor Pavel Batitsky (June–September 1948)
- General-mayor Vasily Yefimovich Vasilyev (December 1948–July 1952)
- General-mayor Andrey Nikitich Gervasiyev (6 August 1952–15 November 1956)
- General-mayor Vasily Ivanovich Shcherbenko (15 November 1956–15 August 1957)
