= Jaruga =

Jaruga may refer to:

- Jaruga, Bosnia and Herzegovina, village near Bosansko Grahovo
- Jaruga Hydroelectric Power Plant, power station near Skradin, Croatia
- Jaruga (river), a subterranean river in the Livanjsko field, Bosnia and Herzegovina
- Jaruga or Yaruha, a village near Busha, Vinnytsia, Ukraine
