= Russian MP =

Russian MP can refer to

- A member of the Russia Military Police
- A member of the State Duma, the lower house of the Russian Federal Assembly
