= 340th Rifle Division =

- Active: 1941–1945
- Country: Soviet Union
- Branch: Red Army
- Type: Infantry
- Size: Division
- Engagements: Battle of Moscow; Case Blue; Battle of Kursk; Battle of the Dniepr; Battle of Kiev (1943); Lvov–Sandomierz Offensive; Prague Offensive
- Decorations: Order of the Red Banner; Order of Suvorov; Order of Kutuzov
- Battle honours: Sumy; Kiev

Commanders
- Notable commanders: Maj. Gen. Sarkis Sogomonovich Martirosyan; Col. Iosef Egorovich Zubarev; Col. Ivan Dmitrievich Dryakhlov; Maj. Gen. Viktor Lvovich Makhlinovskii; Maj. Gen. Fyodor Nazarovich Parkhomenko

The 340th Rifle Division began forming in August 1941, as a standard Red Army rifle division, at Balashov in the Saratov Oblast. The division went into the lines defending Moscow in November, then into the winter counteroffensive in December. After rebuilding, the division was assigned as the only rifle division in the new 5th Tank Army, but avoided the fate of most of the tank units of that formation when it attacked in July 1942. Following another aborted offensive in July, the 340th settled into mostly defensive assignments until after the Soviet victory at Kursk, when it joined in the general offensive through eastern Ukraine to the Dniepr River, winning honors for its role in the liberation of Sumy, and later Kiev. During 1944 the division continued the westward march through northern Ukraine and on into Poland in the Lvov-Sandomierz Offensive before being reassigned to 4th Ukrainian Front advancing into the Carpathian Mountains of Slovakia. The 340th ended its distinguished record of service in 1st Guards Army in Czechoslovakia.

== Formation ==
The division started forming up in August 1941 in the Volga Military District, at Balashov. Its order of battle was as follows:

- 1140th Rifle Regiment
- 1142nd Rifle Regiment
- 1144th Rifle Regiment
- 911th Artillery Regiment

On September 21, Col. Sarkis Sogomonovich Martirosyan took command of the division, a post he would hold until July 1, 1943; on December 20, 1942, he was promoted to the rank of Major General.

In October, the division moved to the Moscow Military District and was assigned to the 26th (Reserve) Army forming there. In late November it was released from the Reserve of the Supreme High Command and assigned to the 49th Army in Western Front; on the morning of November 30 the trains carrying the division began offloading at Pakhimovo station.

=== Battle of Moscow ===
On December 2, the 340th was transferred to General Ivan Boldin's 50th Army in and around Tula by command of Western Front. The division was reinforced with two mortar battalions and was ordered to attack the enemy in the direction of Rudnevo. By December 7 it had taken this objective, as well as Nefedovo, Revyakino station, Fedyashevo and Sukhotino, while also linking up with the 740th Rifle Regiment of the 217th Rifle Division in the Sine-Tulitsa area.

The 112th Tank Division was shipped from Far Eastern Front to Western Front in November, and by this time was in the Tula area. In further preparation for the general counteroffensive, on December 7 this division was unified with the 340th under a single command and directed to attack in the direction of Revyakino and Kostrovo. This arrangement only lasted until December 10, when the 340th was transferred back to 49th Army. On the same date, Western Front ordered an attack to begin on December 13 to encircle and destroy the German forces operating between the Oka and Upa Rivers. Accordingly, the division was assigned to an independent operational group along with the 173rd and 238th Rifle Divisions. The main attack was to be made by the 340th and 173rd towards Pleshivka and Shchukino; the division had the 36th Guards Mortar Battalion and an independent tank battalion attached for the operation. The assault began at 0700 hours on December 14, and by midday the division was fighting for Glebovo and Skorovarovo in the face of stubborn resistance. Over the next day it developed successfully, and by day's end the 340th captured Popovka and was attacking towards Zakharovka.

The 340th remained in 50th Army through most of the winter counteroffensive, before being pulled back to the Reserve of the Supreme High Command in May 1942, to recover from the losses it sustained in five months of offensive combat.

== Case Blue ==
In June, the 340th was in reserve in the Moscow Military District where it was assigned to the newly formed 5th Tank Army. The first Soviet tank armies were experimental and had one or more rifle divisions under command. By this time the division had been rebuilt to nearly full strength, with each rifle company averaging 120 – 140 men with 12 light machine guns each. The 911th Artillery Regiment was actually over-strength in 122mm howitzers, with 18 pieces instead of the authorized 12, but had only 12 76mm cannon against the authorized 20.

The division went back into battle in Bryansk Front in July. On June 28, the northern part of the German summer offensive began, and was soon rolling towards Voronezh. On July 2 the Front commander, Lt. Gen. F.I. Golikov, transferred the 340th, as well as the 1st Guards Rifle Division, the 8th Cavalry Corps, and two tank brigades to back up 13th Army's defenses east of the city, although the division officially remained in 5th Tank Army. On July 6, 24th Panzer Division entered Voronezh almost unopposed, but by now the German VII Army Corps and XXXXVIII Panzer Corps had put themselves in a position where they were, in theory, vulnerable to encirclement. On Stalin's orders of the same date, 5th Tank Army began a counterstroke to accomplish just that. The 340th played a limited role in this attack, providing support on the right flank up to the Sukhaia Vereika River, then falling back relatively intact when the operation was shut down on July 14.

=== Hill 213.8 ===
A further effort was ordered to begin on July 18, but in the event could not begin until the 21st. 5th Tank Army had been dissolved, but its component mobile units were partly brought back up to strength for the new attack. The new commander of Bryansk Front, Lt. Gen. K.K. Rokossovsky, delegated his deputy commander, Maj. Gen. N. E. Chibisov, to take personal control of 38th Army's shock group for the offensive, which included the 340th and four other rifle divisions, as Operational Group Chibisov. The 340th and 284th Rifle Divisions were specifically assigned to cooperate with 7th and 11th Tank Corps. (By coincidence, at the start of the attack the 340th was facing elements of the German 340th Infantry Division.)

The offensive kicked off at 0430 hrs. following a 30-minute artillery preparation. The 1144th Rifle Regiment, in its division's first echelon, was directly supported by the 203rd Tank Battalion (8 KV tanks and 3 T-60 tanks) of the 89th Tank Brigade, as well as a mobile artillery group from the 4th Destroyer Brigade (76mm guns). On its attack sector the German forward positions ran along the slopes of Hill 213.8 and an elongated patch of woods east of it, referred to by the Germans as "Crocodile Woods". Fire from these positions separated the infantry from the tanks, and only after a bombardment of more than 100 rockets from the 66th Guards Mortar Regiment were the attackers able to break into the German trenches at the crest of the hill. However, at this point the advance stalled without breaching the German line. The divisional command put this failure down to the inability of the 284th to advance on its flank. In this fighting the 1144th Regiment took 29 prisoners while losing 228 men (419 by another source) wounded and an undetermined number of dead and missing.

The remainder of Group Chibisov fared better, driving deep into the defenses of the 387th Infantry Division. By the end of July 22 a gap 20 km wide and 10 km deep had been torn in the German line, and their 542nd Regiment was encircled. German 2nd Army reacted quickly, moving up two regiments of 168th Infantry Division, plus 9th Panzer and 385th Infantry Divisions against the west flank of Chibisov's penetration. By the end of the next day the offensive had been halted, 2nd Tank Corps was partially encircled by 168th Infantry, and at dawn of the 24th the 9th Panzer launched a counterattack which split 7th and 11th Tank Corps and carved a 10 km-deep corridor by nightfall. The 340th was fortunate to escape the following encirclement, but that was in part due to its own lack of progress. The collapse of Chibisov's offensive was in part responsible for Stalin's issuing, on July 28, People's Commissariat of Defense Order No. 227, better known as "Ни шагу назад!" or "Not a Step Back!"

== Into Ukraine ==
In September the 340th was transferred to Voronezh Front; it would remain in this Front (and its successor 1st Ukrainian Front) until November 1944. At first it was in 38th Army, but in January 1943, it was in 40th Army and took part in the first liberation of Belgorod on February 9 during the winter counteroffensive following the victory at Stalingrad. In April, after this offensive ended, it was back in 38th Army, where it remained until nearly the end of the year. Following the victory at Kursk in July, 38th Army began its advance towards the Dniepr River in August, and in the same month the 340th was assigned to the 50th Rifle Corps; it would bounce back and forth from the 50th to the 51st Rifle Corps until February 1944. General Martirosian took command of the 50th Rifle Corps on July 1, and he was replaced in command of the division by Col. Mitrofan Ivanovich Shadrin. Colonel I.E. Zubarev took command of the division on August 21, a post he would hold until he was killed in action on January 10, 1944. On September 2 the division shared credit for the liberation of Sumy, and won its name as an honorific:

"SUMY" – 340 Rifle Division (Colonel Zubarev, Iosef Egorovich)... the troops who participated in the liberation of Sumy, by the order of the Supreme High Command of 2 September 1943, and a commendation in Moscow, are given a salute of 12 artillery salvos from 124 guns.

The division earned another honorific for its role in the liberation of the city of Kiev:

"KIEV" – 340 Rifle Division (Colonel Zubarev, Iosef Egorovich)... the troops who participated in the liberation of Kiev, by the order of the Supreme High Command of 6 November 1943, and a commendation in Moscow, are given a salute of 24 artillery salvos from 324 guns.

From November 1943 - February 1944, the division was back in 40th Army, and took part in the liberation of Belaya Tserkov on January 4, 1944. On the same day the division was further recognized for its services with the award of the Order of the Red Banner. On January 27 the 340th came under the command of Col. Ivan Dmitrievich Dryakhlov, but he was replaced at the end of April by Maj. Gen. Viktor Lvovich Makhlinovsky. From March until July the division was in the 106th Rifle Corps of 60th Army, then returned to 38th Army, where it served in both 52nd and 67th Rifle Corps; it moved between these two Corps for the duration. On September 5, Maj. Gen. Fyodor Nazarovich Parkhomenko took command of the division, a post he would hold for the duration of the war. In November, 38th Army was assigned to 4th Ukrainian Front, and the 340th remained in this Front for the duration, moving to 1st Guards Army in March 1945, when 67th Rifle Corps was transferred. On April 5 the division was awarded the Order of Kutuzov, 2nd Class, in recognition of its role in the liberation of the village of Belsko.

== Postwar ==
The men and women of the division ended the war with the full title of 340th Rifle, Sumy-Kiev, Order of the Red Banner, Order of Suvorov, Order of Kutuzov Division (Russian: 340-я стрелковая Сумско-Киевская Краснознамённая орденов Суворова и Кутузова дивизия). The division was disbanded "in place" during the summer of 1945 with the Northern Group of Forces.
