= Sarkis Martirosyan =

- Martirosyan after his 1945 promotion to general-leytenant
- Born: 21 September [O.S. 8 September] 1900; Matrasa, Baku Governorate, Russian Empire
- Died: 15 February 1984 (aged 83); Yerevan, Armenian SSR, Soviet Union
- Military career
- Allegiance: Russian SFSR; First Armenian Republic; Soviet Union
- Branch: Red Guards; Army of the First Armenian Republic; Red Army
- Service years: March–November 1918; 1919–1920; 1920–1938; 1939–1953
- Rank: General-leytenant
- Commands: 227th Rifle Division; 340th Rifle Division; 50th Rifle Corps; 73rd Rifle Corps; 27th Rifle Corps
- Conflicts: Russian Civil War; World War II
- Awards: Hero of the Soviet Union; Order of Lenin (4); Order of the Red Banner (4); Order of Suvorov, 2nd class (2)

Sarkis Sogomonovich Martirosyan (Armenian: Սարգիս Մարտիրոսյան, Russian: Саркис Согомонович Мартиросян; 21 September [O.S. 8 September] 1900 – 15 February 1984) was a Soviet–Armenian general-leytenant of the Red Army.

Martirosyan joined the Red Guards and fought in the Battle of Baku during the Russian Civil War. After fleeing to independent Armenia he was conscripted into that country's army, and joined the Red Army upon the Soviet invasion of Armenia. During the interwar period he rose to division chief of staff, before being imprisoned for almost a year during the Great Purge. After being freed and restored in the army Martirosyan became a division chief of staff, beginning World War II in that capacity. After distinguishing himself in the Battle of Kiev, he commanded the 340th Rifle Division in the Battle of Moscow, Battle of Voronezh, and the Soviet advance into Ukraine in early 1943. In mid-1943 he was promoted to command the 50th Rifle Corps, and in March 1944 transferred to command the 73rd Rifle Corps. He was made a Hero of the Soviet Union for his leadership of the 73rd Rifle Corps in the January 1945 Sandomierz–Silesian offensive. After the end of the war Martirosyan held corps command before ending his career as an assistant army commander.

== Early life and Russian Civil War ==
An Armenian, Sarkis Sogomonovich Martirosyan was born on 21 September 1900 in the village of Matrasa, Baku Governorate. The son of a priest, he graduated from the village school, then studied at the Gevorgian Seminary in Echmiadzin from August 1914 to July 1917. During the Russian Civil War, in March 1918, Martirosyan joined the 19th Workers' Battalion of the Red Guards, with which he took part in the defense of Baku from advancing Ottoman forces in the Battles of Kurdamir, Goychay, and Shemakha. After the Ottoman capture of the Transcaucasus and the overthrow of the Baku Commune in September, Martirosyan crossed through Georgia to Armenia and was unemployed. On 16 July 1919 during a round-up in Yerevan he was conscripted into the Army of the Republic of Armenia and sent to the Yerevan Guard Battalion as a ryadovoy. From March 1920 he served in the 1st Armenian Cavalry Regiment at Yelizavetpol. After graduating from a short-term machine gun training held by the machine gun squadron in September he was promoted to junior unter-ofitser and appointed commander of a machine gun section. In November of that year, after the Soviet invasion of Armenia, he joined the Red Army. Between February and April 1921 he served as gun-layer of a medium machine gun and commander of a machine gun platoon during the suppression of the February Uprising and the capture of Yerevan.

== Interwar period ==
From June 1922 he served in the 2nd Armenian Rifle Regiment of the Armenian Rifle Division of the Separate Caucasus Army as a platoon and company commander, and acting regimental chief of staff. During this period he completed the machine gun section refresher courses for command personnel at the army headquarters in Tbilisi in 1924, the reconnaissance section of the refresher courses in 1925, and the Command Personnel Improvement Courses for reconnaissance in Moscow in 1928. He became a member of the Communist Party in 1925. Martirosyan participated in the suppression of resistance to collectivization in Armenia in October and November 1930. From April 1931 he served on the division staff as assistant chief of the 1st department and chief of the 2nd section. From October 1937 he temporarily served as chief of staff and assistant chief of staff of the 76th Mountain Rifle Division (redesignated from the Armenian Rifle Division). During the Great Purge, he was imprisoned by the NKVD investigation in July 1938, and as a result was dismissed from the army on 5 August. In June 1939 he was freed due to lack of evidence, restored in the army and appointed chief of the operations section of the staff of the 121st Rifle Division of the Belorussian Special Military District. In this capacity he took part in the Soviet invasion of Poland in September. Martirosyan was transferred to the Kharkov Military District in March 1941, where he served as chief of staff of the new 227th Rifle Division at Slavyansk.

== World War II ==
After the German invasion of the Soviet Union began on 22 June, the division was dispatched to the Southern Front between 30 June and 2 July. The 227th was transferred to the 26th Army of the Southwestern Front on 19 July and took part in the Battle of Kiev. Then-Lieutenant Colonel Martirosyan temporarily commanded the division between 24 and 31 July, and was evaluated as having coped well with the responsibilities of command. With the arrival of re-appointed division commander Colonel Yefim Makarchuk Martirosyan returned to his primary duties as chief of staff. Makarchuk characterized Martirosyan as a "tactically competent chief of staff...quickly orienting himself in the situation, skillfully organizes the direction of the troops and implementation of command decisions." With the 26th Army, the division fought on the Vinnytsia axis east of Proskurov. During the Battle of Kiev the division took part in counterattacks conducted by the army south of Kiev against the units of the German 1st Panzer Group in the vicinity of Tarashcha, Luki, Boguslav, Yanovka, and Kovali. Wounded in the leg during the fighting, Martirosyan was treated at Evacuation Hospital No. 1683 and discharged on 22 September.

In September, Martirosyan was appointed commander of the new 340th Rifle Division, supervising its formation in the Volga Military District at Balashov. On 27 November the division was sent to the Western Front and as part of the 50th and then the 49th (from 10 December) Armies took part in the Tula and Kaluga offensive operations, part of the Soviet counteroffensive during the Battle of Moscow, and in the liberation of the cities of Aleksin and Kaluga. For his leadership of the division in the Tula offensive, Martirosyan was awarded the Order of the Red Banner on 12 April. The recommendation read:

Comrade Martirosyan has served as commander of the 340th Rifle Division during the battles against the German-Fascist occupiers near Tula. The 340th Rifle Division operated on the main axis for the liquidation of the Laptevskaya group of the enemy. Skillfully operating, Comrade Martirosyan's division destroyed the 3rd Panzer Division of Guderian, upsetting the plan of the German command to blockade Tula. In the most tense moment of the battle for the village of Rudnevo, Comrade Martirosyan personally led the attack of the 1144th Rifle Regiment, inspring the soldiers and commanders to a rapid advance forward. The capture of Rudnevo village ensued the full encirclement and destruction of the Laptevskaya enemy group. In the destruction of the Aleksin and Kaluga enemy groups the 340th Rifle Division gained a serious of major victories, inflicting significant damage on the enemy in personnel and equipment.

From January to April his division fought in the offensive battles on the Vyazma axis, taking part in the Rzhev–Vyazma offensive, and then was withdrawn to the Reserve of the Supreme High Command. In reserve the 340th was assigned to the 58th Army before being shifted to the 5th Tank Army on 5 June. From 16 July the division and army were subordinated to the Bryansk Front and as part of the Operational Group of Lieutenant General Nikandr Chibisov took part in the Voronezh–Voroshilovgrad defensive operation. The 340th was shifted to the 38th Army on 8 August. From January it fought in the Ostrogozhsk–Rossosh offensive, Voronezh–Kastornoye offensive, and the Kharkov offensive operation, during which the cities of Belgorod, Kharkov, Trostyanets, Akhtyrka, and Gadyach were liberated. From 5 March the division was part of the 69th Army and took part in fighting on the line of Naumovka, Petrovka and Varvarovka. German tank units flanked and encircled the division, forcing its elements to break out in small groups. Communication with the commander of the 69th Army was restored on 19 March and after its breakout the division was withdrawn for rebuilding. After receiving replacements, the division returned to the 38th Army on 23 April, and took up defenses southwest of Sudzha on the line from the Psel to Krinichnoye.

In early July, Martirosyan was promoted to command of the new 50th Rifle Corps, which he led as part of the 38th Army in the liberation of Left-bank Ukraine during the drive on Kiev, the Battle of the Dnieper, and the second Battle of Kiev. From 13 November the corps, as part of the 3rd Tank Army, defended positions in the vicinity of Fastov. At the end of the month the corps was shifted to the 40th Army and took part in the Zhitomir–Berdichev offensive, Korsun–Shevchenkovsky Offensive, and the Uman–Botoșani offensive. For distinction in the liberation of Sumy and Kiev the corps was awarded the names of these cities as an honorific.

Martirosyan was transferred to command the 73rd Rifle Corps of the 2nd Ukrainian Front's 52nd Army in April 1944, leading the 73rd for the rest of the war. The corps distinguished itself in the Second Jassy–Kishinev offensive, the Sandomierz–Silesian offensive, the Berlin Offensive, and the Prague offensive. Martirosyan distinguished himself with his leadership of the corps during the Sandomierz–Silesian offensive, breaking through the German defenses on 12 January, units of the corps liberated Chmielnik on 13 January, Wieluń on 19 January and Oels on 25 January, reaching Breslau on 28 January. For exemplary fulfillment of objectives and displaying courage and heroism Martirosyan was recommended for the Order of the Patriotic War, 1st class by army commander Konstantin Koroteyev on 15 May. This was upgraded to the highest award, the title Hero of the Soviet Union, which was awarded on 29 May. A promotion to general-leytenant followed for Martirosyan on 27 June. The recommendation read:

A great contribution in the Great Patriotic War for the liberation of our Motherland and the countries allied to us from the yoke of the German-Fascist invaders belongs to Major General Martirosyan.

Commanding the 73rd Rifle Corps from June 1943, he led his formation through the fields of Ukraine, and in difficult battles defended every inch of native Ukrainian soil.

In the destruction of the Korsun-Shevchenkovsky grouping, in the destruction of thirty enemy divisions in the Jassy-Kishinev operation, in the breakthrough of the powerful, deeply echeloned enemy defenses in the vicinity of Yassy, Romania, the 73rd Rifle Corps under the command of Major General Martirosyan always was on the main axis and always successfully carried out the tasks of the army military council.

On 12 January 1945, the 73rd Rifle Corps inflicted a destructive strike against the enemy forces on the Sandomierz bridgehead and pursuing the shattered units rapidly moved forward.

On the night of 20/21 January 1945 it was the first to enter the territory of Germany and by 28 January reached a major economic and strategic center of Germany, the city of Breslau.

Just in battles on German territory sixteen cities were captured, more than 1,600 settlements, more than 20,600 soldiers and officers destroyed, 83 tanks, 21 aircraft, and 128 depots with materiel captured.

In the course of all combat operations during the Great Patriotic War Major General Martirosyan displayed exemplary mastery of the knowledge of commanding troops, courage and valor in battle, and selfless loyalty to the Motherland. He cultivated hundreds of thousands of order-bearers and hundreds of Heroes of the Soviet Union. For masterful leadership of troops, for personal courage and valor in battle, for exemplary fulfillment of the tasks of the Military Council of the army in the Great Patriotic War, he is worthy of the state award of the Order of the Patriotic War, 1st class.

== Postwar ==
After the end of the war, Martirosyan continued to command the 73rd Rifle Corps, then studied at the Voroshilov Higher Military Academy. After his graduation from the academy he took command of the 27th Rifle Corps of the Carpathian Military District in April 1947. In February 1951 he was transferred to the Transcaucasian Military District to serve as assistant commander of the 7th Guards Army. Transferred to the reserve on 11 April 1953, Martirosyan died in Yerevan on 15 February 1984. He was buried at the Tokmakh cemetery in Yerevan.

== Awards and honors ==
- Soviet Union
  - Hero of Soviet Union (29 May 1945)
  - Four Order of Lenin (1 January 1944, 6 April 1945, 29 May 1945, 6 May 1946)
  - Four Order of the Red Banner (12 April 1942, 13 September 1944, 3 November 1944, 15 November 1950)
  - Two Order of Suvorov, 2nd class (8 February 1943, 17 May 1944)
  - Order of Friendship (19 September 1980)
  - Jubilee Medal "In Commemoration of the 100th Anniversary of the Birth of Vladimir Ilyich Lenin"
  - Medal "For the Defence of Moscow"
  - Medal "For the Defence of Stalingrad"
  - Medal "For the Victory over Germany in the Great Patriotic War 1941–1945"
  - Jubilee Medal "Twenty Years of Victory in the Great Patriotic War 1941–1945"
  - Medal "For the Capture of Berlin"
  - Medal "For the Liberation of Prague"
  - Medal "Veteran of the Armed Forces of the USSR"
  - Jubilee Medal "XX Years of the Workers' and Peasants' Red Army"
  - Jubilee Medal "30 Years of the Soviet Army and Navy"
  - Jubilee Medal "40 Years of the Armed Forces of the USSR"
  - Jubilee Medal "50 Years of the Armed Forces of the USSR"
  - Jubilee Medal "60 Years of the Armed Forces of the USSR"
- USA
  - Legion of Merit, Comandor (26 July 1944) (USA)
- Czechoslovakia
  - Order of the White Lion, 2nd class
  - Czechoslovak War Cross 1939–1945
  - Medal “For Strengthening Friendship in Arms”, Golden class
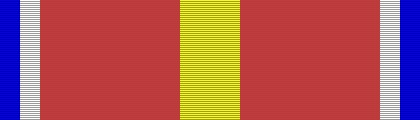
  - Medal "In Commemoration of the Battle of Dukla Pass"
  - Order of the Slovak National Uprising
- Poland
  - Virtuti Militari, 3rd class
  - Order For Merits in Field of Glory, 3rd class
  - Three Cross of Valour

Martirosyan was declared an honorary citizen of Sumy, Wieluń and Wrocław. A street in Kiev was named for him until October 2022, when it was renamed following the Russian invasion of Ukraine.
