= 50th Rifle Corps =

- Allegiance: Soviet Union
- Branch: Soviet Red Army
- Engagements: Eastern Front (World War II); Operation Barbarossa

The 50th Rifle Corps was a corps of the Soviet Red Army. It was part of the 23rd Army on 22 June 1941. It took part in the Great Patriotic War.

== Organization ==
On 22 June 1941, the corps included the following units:

- 43rd Rifle Division
- 70th Rifle Division
- 123rd Rifle Division

== Commanders ==
- Komkor Filipp Gorelenko (08.1939 - 05.1940)
- Komkor Panteleimon Zaitsev (05.1940 - 08.1940)
- Major General Vladimir Shcherbakov (17.01.1941 - 04.08.1941)
- Major General Sarkis Martirosyan (25.06.1943 - 24.04.1944)
- Major General Pavel Batitsky (25.04.1944 - 27.05.1944)
- Major General Serafim Merkulov (28.05.1944 - 20.04.1945)
- Major General Nikolai Tavartkiladze (21.04.1945 - 11.05.1945)
