= Pavel Batitsky =

Soviet military leader

Pavel Fyodorovich Batitsky
- Павел Фёдорович Батицкий
- Batitsky c. 1960s
- Born: 27 June 1910; Kharkov, Russian Empire
- Died: 17 February 1984 (aged 73); Moscow, Russian SFSR, Soviet Union
- Burial place: Novodevichy Cemetery
- Military career
- Allegiance: Soviet Union
- Branch: Red Army
- Service years: 1924–1978
- Rank: Marshal of the Soviet Union
- Commands: Moscow Air Defence District; Soviet Air Defence Forces
- Awards: Hero of the Soviet Union

Pavel Fyodorovich Batitsky (Ukrainian: Павло Федорович Батицький; Russian: Па́вел Фёдорович Бати́цкий; 27 June 1910 – 17 February 1984) was a Soviet military leader awarded the highest honorary title of Hero of the Soviet Union in 1965 and promoted to Marshal of the Soviet Union in 1968. Batitsky served in the Red Army from 1924 and was commander-in-chief of the Air Defence Forces from 1966 to 1978. Following the death of Joseph Stalin in 1953, he was chosen to personally execute Lavrentiy Beria, the former head of the NKVD.

== Biography ==
He was born in Kharkov, in the Russian Empire, and joined the Red Army in October 1924. At the age of 14, he entered the Kharkov Military Preparatory School (soon relocated to Poltava) and in 1926, was sent to study at the Military Cavalry School, graduating in 1929. From March 1929 to May 1935, he served in the cavalry and commanded a platoon and squad in the Byelorussian Military District.

In 1938, he graduated with honors from the Frunze Military Academy. From September 1939 to December 1940, he was in China as Chief of Staff of Soviet military advisers at the headquarters of Chiang Kai-shek. Upon returning to the Soviet Union, he was made Chief of Staff of the 11th Motorized Machine Gun Artillery Brigade at Kaunas in the Baltic Special Military District. In March 1941, he was appointed Chief of Staff of the 202nd Motorized Division. Later that year, he took command of the 254th Rifle Division. Later, during World War II, he commanded the 73rd Rifle Corps (1943–1944) and the 128th Rifle Corps (1944–1945). After World War II he was Chief of the General Staff and Deputy Commander-in-Chief of the Soviet Air Forces (1950–1953). In December 1953, he was chosen personally to execute Lavrentiy Beria as part of a plot led by Nikita Khrushchev and assisted by the military forces of Marshal of the Soviet Union Georgy Zhukov (Batitsky was Colonel-General and First Deputy Commander of the Moscow Military District at the time).

Batitsky died in Moscow on 17 February 1984. He was buried in the Novodevichy Cemetery.

== Honours and awards ==
- Hero of the Soviet Union
- Five Orders of Lenin
- Order of the October Revolution
- Five Orders of the Red Banner
- Order of Kutuzov 1st class
- Order of Suvorov 2nd class
- Order of Kutuzov 2nd class
- Order for Service to the Homeland in the Armed Forces of the USSR 3rd class
- Campaign and Jubilee medals
- 16 foreign decorations
