= Commandant's Service =

Name for the military police of some states of Warsaw Pact

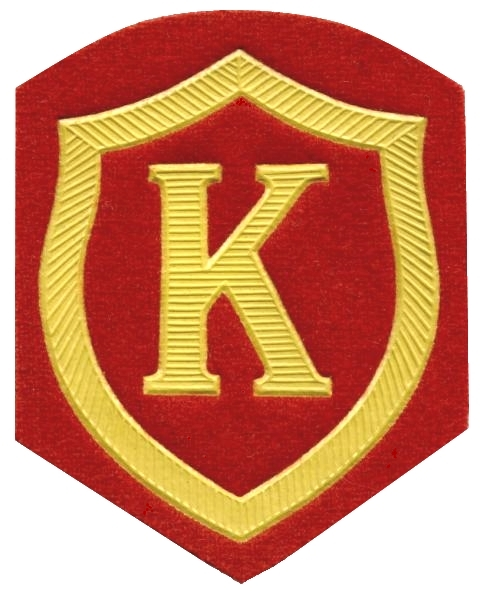
Red shield arm patch of the USSR’s Commandant's Service

Commandant's Service was the name for the military police of the Soviet Armed Forces and some associated Warsaw Pact armies. Its principal duties were providing garrison security and traffic control. It is not to be confused with a similar organization called Traffic Regulators operated by the Transport Troops of the Rear Services.

== Soviet Union/Russia ==
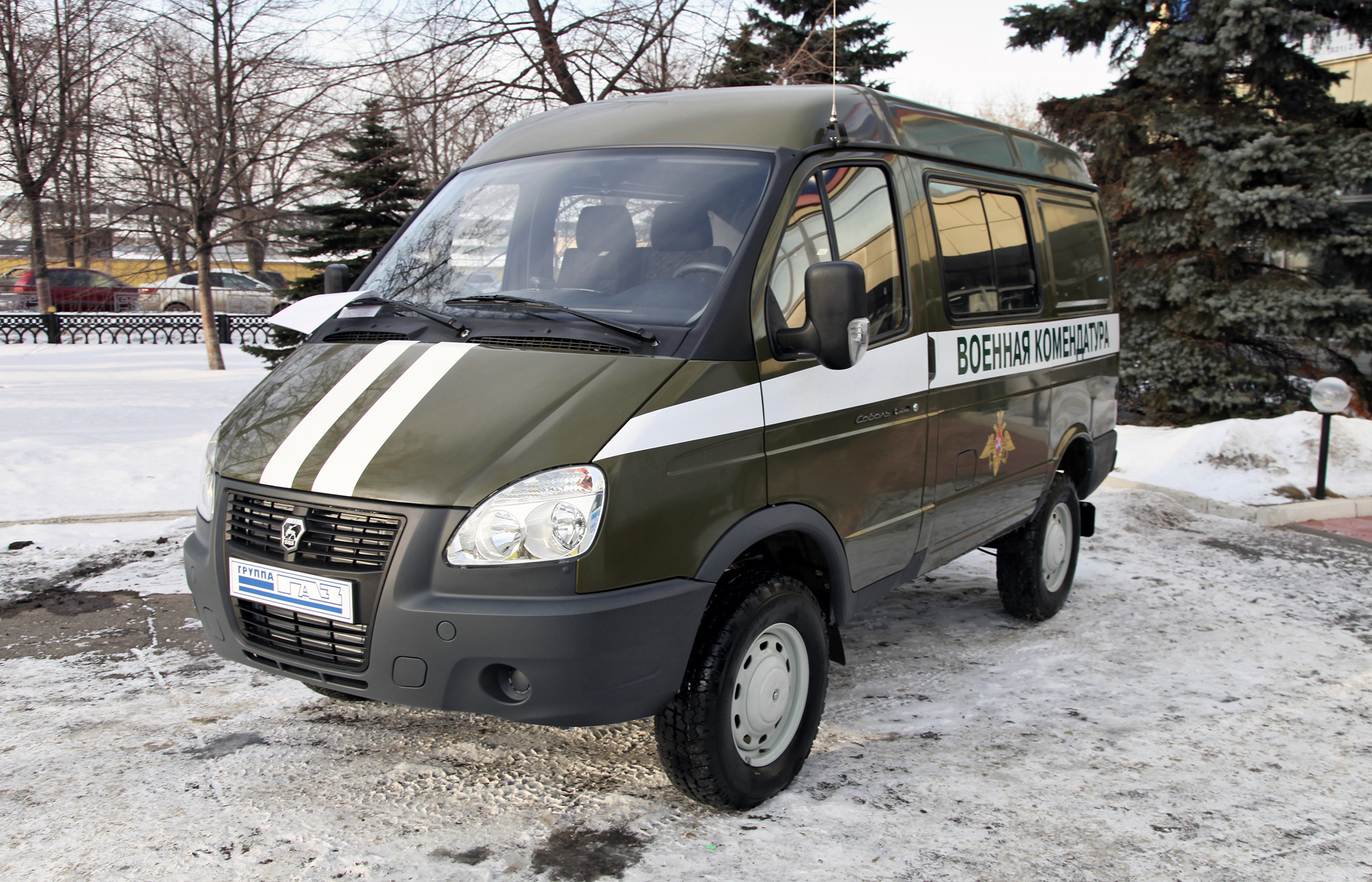
GAZ Sobol Commandant's Service van, Russia

The Komendantskaya sluzhba (Russian: комендантская служба) or 'komendatura' (комендатура) in the Soviet and Russian militaries were designated by a red shield on one or both arms bearing a yellow letter "K", plain red shoulder boards and a white helmet bearing a red star and broad red circumferential stripe. These helmets were generally painted at the unit level. Since 2011 komendatura became a local branch of Military Police of Russia.

At one time the komendatura members wore a black cloth or leather uniform with white helmets and gloves, and belts and holsters.

== Belarus ==
As of 2025, there are 6 military commandant's services in the Belarusian Armed Forces.

== Bulgaria ==
The Commandment Service is part of the Ministry of Defence, located in Sofia and is in charge of real estate management, transportation, library services, documentation publishing and communications support for the central administration of the MoD, transportation support to the immediate MoD personnel, classified information, cryptographic, and perimeter security for the MoD administration buildings.

== East Germany ==
The East German Army Commandant's Service was called the Kommandantendienst or KD, in addition to traffic control and military police duties it performed courier services. The Kommandantendienst wore a white stripe on their helmet and a white cross strap and belt, handgun holster and gloves.

== See also ==
- Commandant
- Military Police
- Regimental Police
- Traffic Regulator
