= Military Police (Russia) =

Uniformed law enforcement branch of the Russian Armed Forces

Military Police of the Armed Forces of the Russian Federation Военная полиция Вооружённых сил Российской Федерации
- Official emblem of Military Police of Russia

- Small emblem of Military Police of Russia

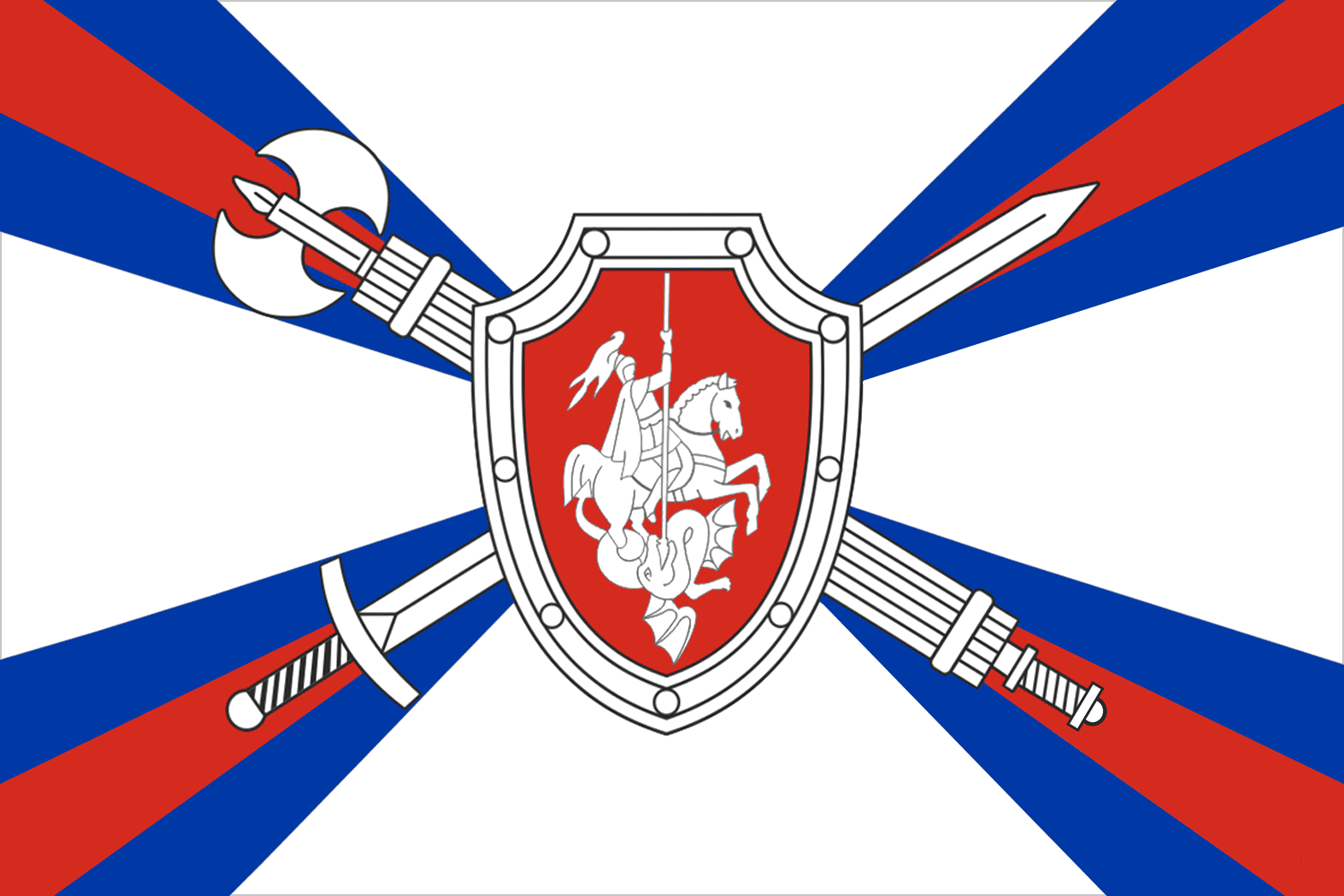
- Flag of Military Police of Russia
- Common name: Voennaya politsiya
- Abbreviation: VP (ВП)

Agency overview
- Formed: 1 December 2011
- Preceding agency: Commandant's Service
- Employees: 6,500 active personnel

Jurisdictional structure
- Operations jurisdiction: Russia
- General nature: Military police

Operational structure
- Overseen by: Ministry of Defence
- Agency executive: Colonel General Sergey Kuralenko, Commander
- Parent agency: Russian Armed Forces

Notables
- Significant operations: Russian military intervention in Syria; 2022 Russian invasion of Ukraine

The Military Police of Russia (Russian: Военная полиция, ВП, romanized: Voennaya politsiya, VP) is the uniformed law enforcement branch of the Russian Armed Forces, which is known by the official name of Military Police of the Armed Forces of the Russian Federation (Военная полиция Вооружённых сил Российской Федерации), and it is operated by the Ministry of Defence.

The Chief of Military Police is ex officio the First Deputy Minister of Defence. The current Chief of Military Police is Colonel General Sergey Kuralenko who replaced Lieutenant General Vladimir Ivanovsky since February 2020.

== Structure and Mission ==
=== Mission ===
The Army's Military Police provide an important function in the full spectrum of Army operations as a member of the Maneuver, Fires, and Effects division. The Military Police provides expertise in police, detainment and stability operations in order to enhance security and enable mobility. The Army's Military Police can be utilized in direct combat and during peacetime.

The Military Police have five main functions:

1. Maneuver and mobility support operations
2. Area security operations
3. Law and order operations
4. Internment and resettlement operations
5. Police intelligence operations

These functions of the Army's Military Police all provide a commander with the necessary information and support for the successful completion of many Army missions.

=== Structure ===
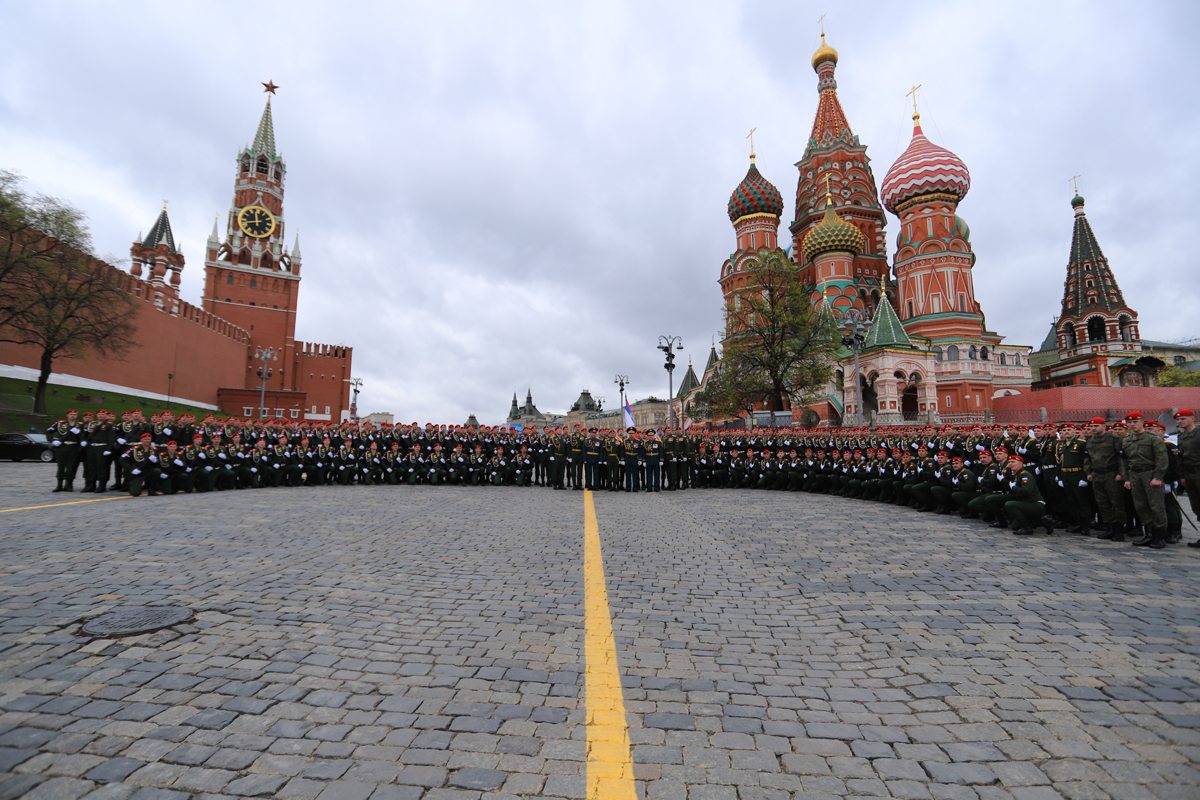
Members of the Military Police of the Central Military District on Red Square.

The system of military police constitute the central office and regional management of the military police:
Regional organs (Региональные органы)

- Regional Directorate of the Military Police for the Western Military District (St. Petersburg)
- Regional Directorate of the Military Police for the Southern Military District (Rostov-on-Don)
- Regional Directorate of the Military Police for the Central Military District (Ekaterinburg)
- Regional Directorate of the Military Police for the Eastern Military District (Khabarovsk)
- Regional Directorate of the Military Police for the Northern Fleet Joint Strategic Command (Severomorsk)

Central office contains the following sub-offices:
Central Apparatus (Центральный аппарат)

- Military Commandature (Военная комендатура) – the main governing body of the Commandant's Service in the armed forces of the Russian Federation. Each Russian military garrison has its own small staff, called a Military Commandature, which is responsible for the enforcement of law and order among the servicemen in the garrison, as well as for the security and protection of the military installations and the military personnel from both military and criminal threats. The Military Office's tasks are:
1. Development in collaboration with officials of the garrison commanders and staffs of the military units of the action plan to meet the objectives of garrison duty and arrangements for its implementation;
2. organization from guarding and defense garrison facilities, control over its incurring;
3. ensuring coherence military garrison units in the translation from peacetime to wartime;
4. business development activities and monitor compliance with servicemen of military discipline in the garrison;
5. undertake measures to ensure the organization of production on materials of misconduct; content on garrison guardhouse soldiers detained; subjected to disciplinary arrest, sentenced to confinement, to be served in the brig; suspected or accused of committing crimes; defendants (accused of crimes and taken into custody, criminal cases which made the production of vessels); convicted by a military court in respect of which the sentence has not entered into force;
6. assistance of territorial bodies of the Ministry of Internal Affairs of the Russian Federation and the investigative agencies of the Investigative Committee of the Russian Federation in the search and detention of military personnel who have committed crimes or deserted their military unit, escorting them and wanted military drivers disappeared from scene of a traffic accident, the participants which they were hijacked and stolen vehicles military units;
7. liaison between garrison fire brigades calling capabilities provided fire protection plan, if a fire occurs on the garrison.
8. planning of the introduction of a state of emergency on the territory of the garrison, including in the case involving troops to ensure the state of emergency, as well as in the event of liquidation (the threat of) emergency situations of natural and man-made disasters, environmental emergencies, including epidemics and epizootic (hereinafter – the emergencies of natural and man-made);
9. harmonization measures to maintain order with the state authorities and local authorities during the preparation and holding of parades and other events involving the garrison troops;
10. Accounting military graves located in closed areas garrisons, and measures to their content in a proper manner.

Each garrison is also to maintain order and control over the observance of military discipline by soldiers on the streets, riding public transport, and in other public places such as transport hubs (railway stations, in ports, airports).

- Military Automobile Inspectorate (Военная автомобильная инспекция or ВАИ)- formerly Military Automobile Inspectorate of the Armed Forces of the Russian Federation (VAI) – a structural unit (up to 2010) Main Tank-Automotive Management (GABTU) of the Ministry of Defense of the Russian Federation i.e. the Traffic Regulators. There also the Road Commendatore Service (ДКС – Дорожная Комендантская Служба) with the same functions.

The Military Automobile Inspectorate is the military traffic police service and its name is in direct parallel to the country's civilian traffic police, which is called State Automobile Inspectorate (Государственная автомобильная инспекция or ГАИ).

"The main tasks of military traffic police are: Road safety in the Armed Forces; monitoring compliance with military and civilian personnel of the Armed Forces of the legislative and other normative legal acts of the Russian Federation on issues of road safety in the army, with the use of vehicles of military units on public roads; ensuring the movement of troops (forces) on public roads and paths columned, organization of road traffic police patrol on a military vehicle traffic routes of military units; State registration of vehicles of military units; conducting state vehicle inspection of military units, as well as guaranteeing access drivers and vehicles of military units to participate in traffic." – Annex to the Order of the Minister of Defence of the Russian Federation on 28 May 2009 № 480

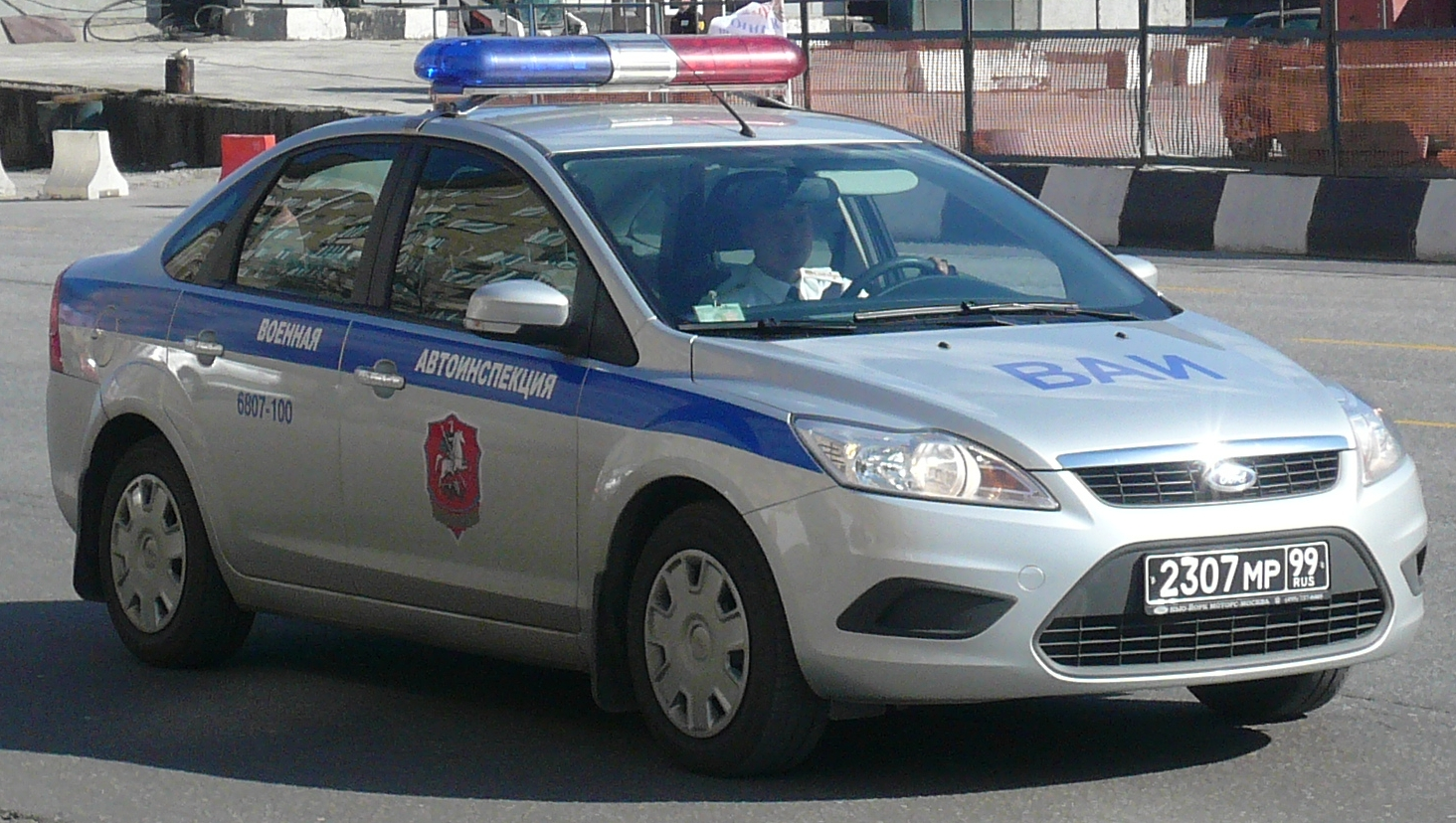
VAI Ford Focus in Moscow

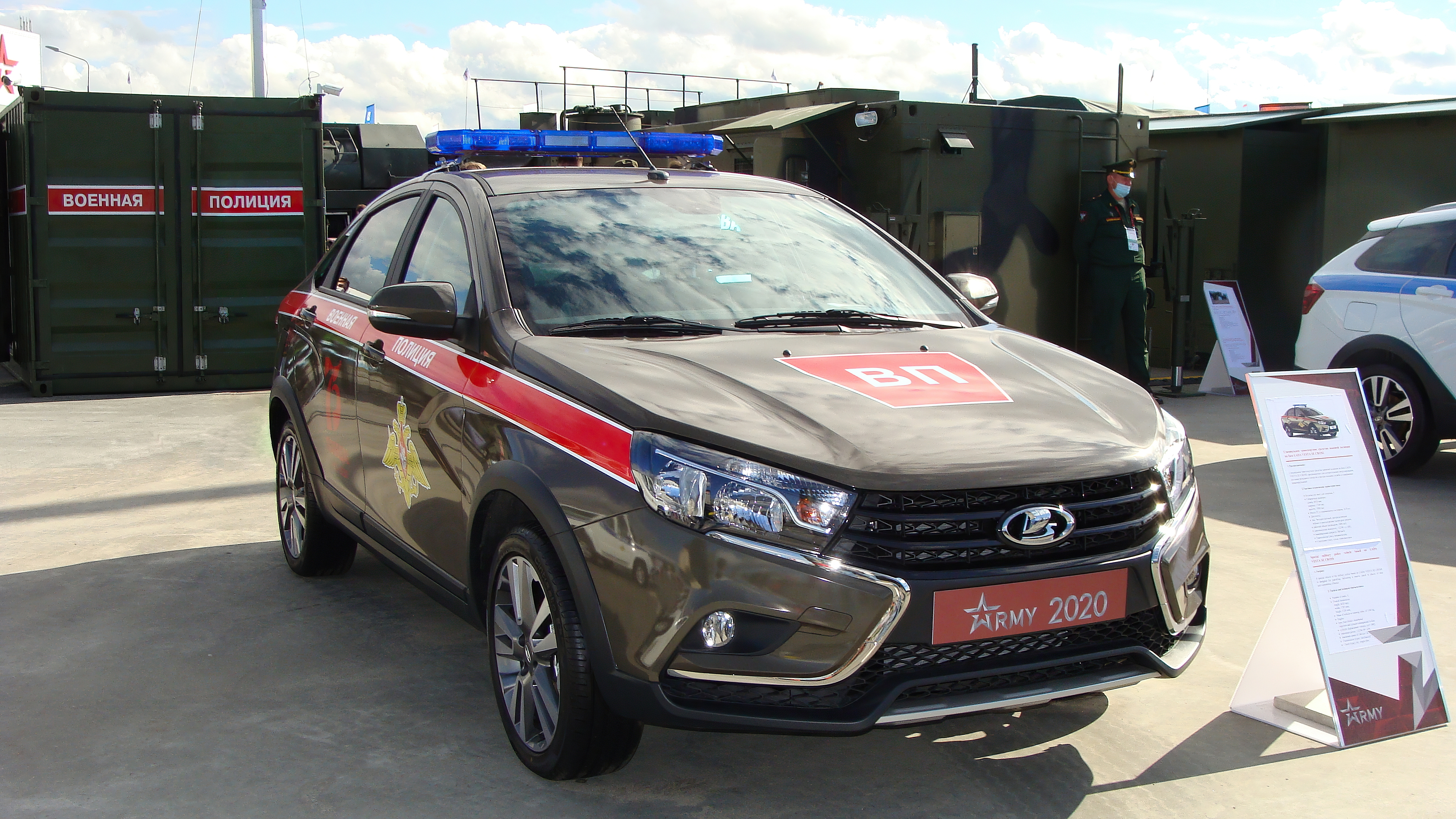
Military Police Lada Vesta.

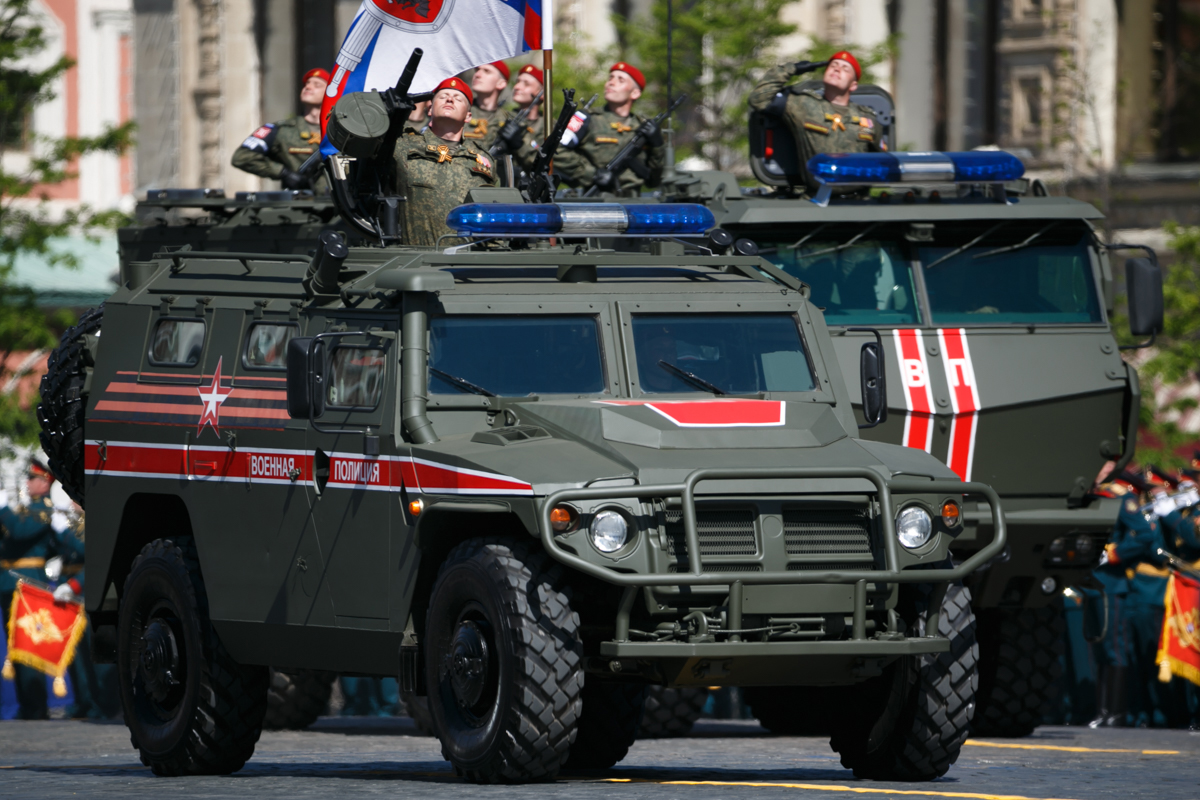
GAZ Tigr

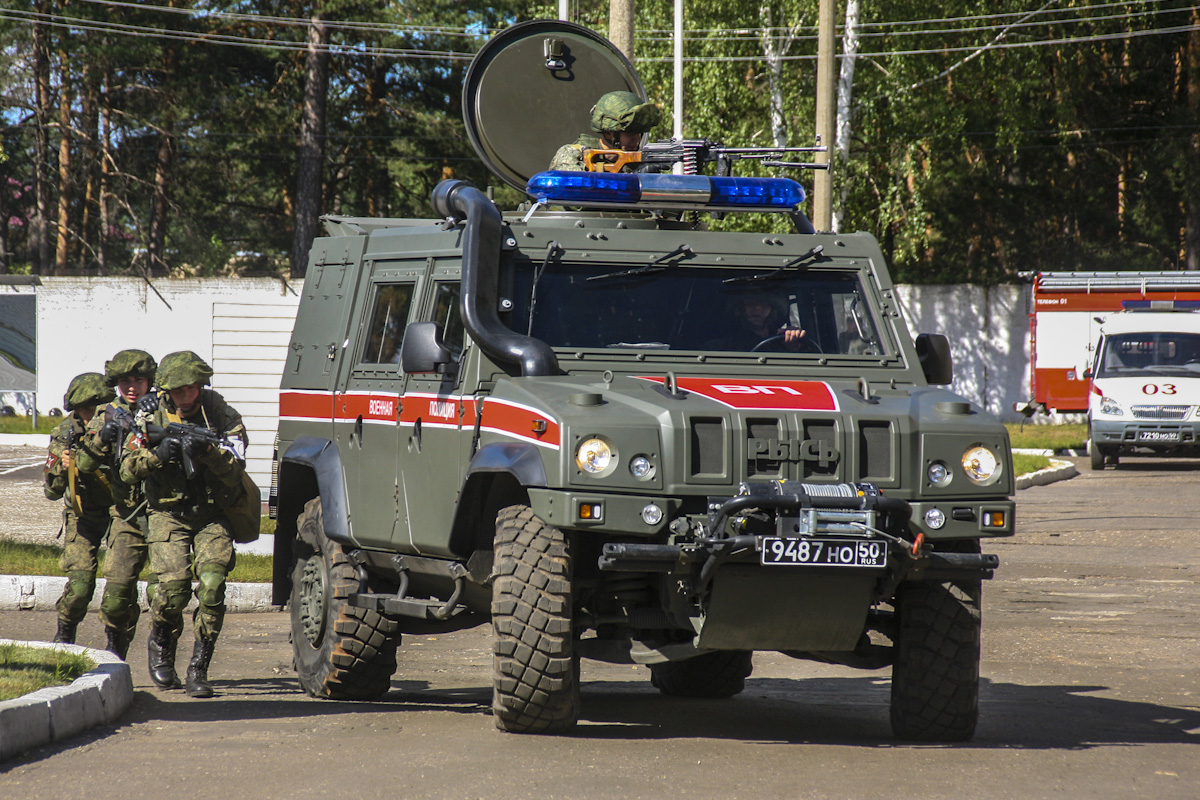
LMV Rys

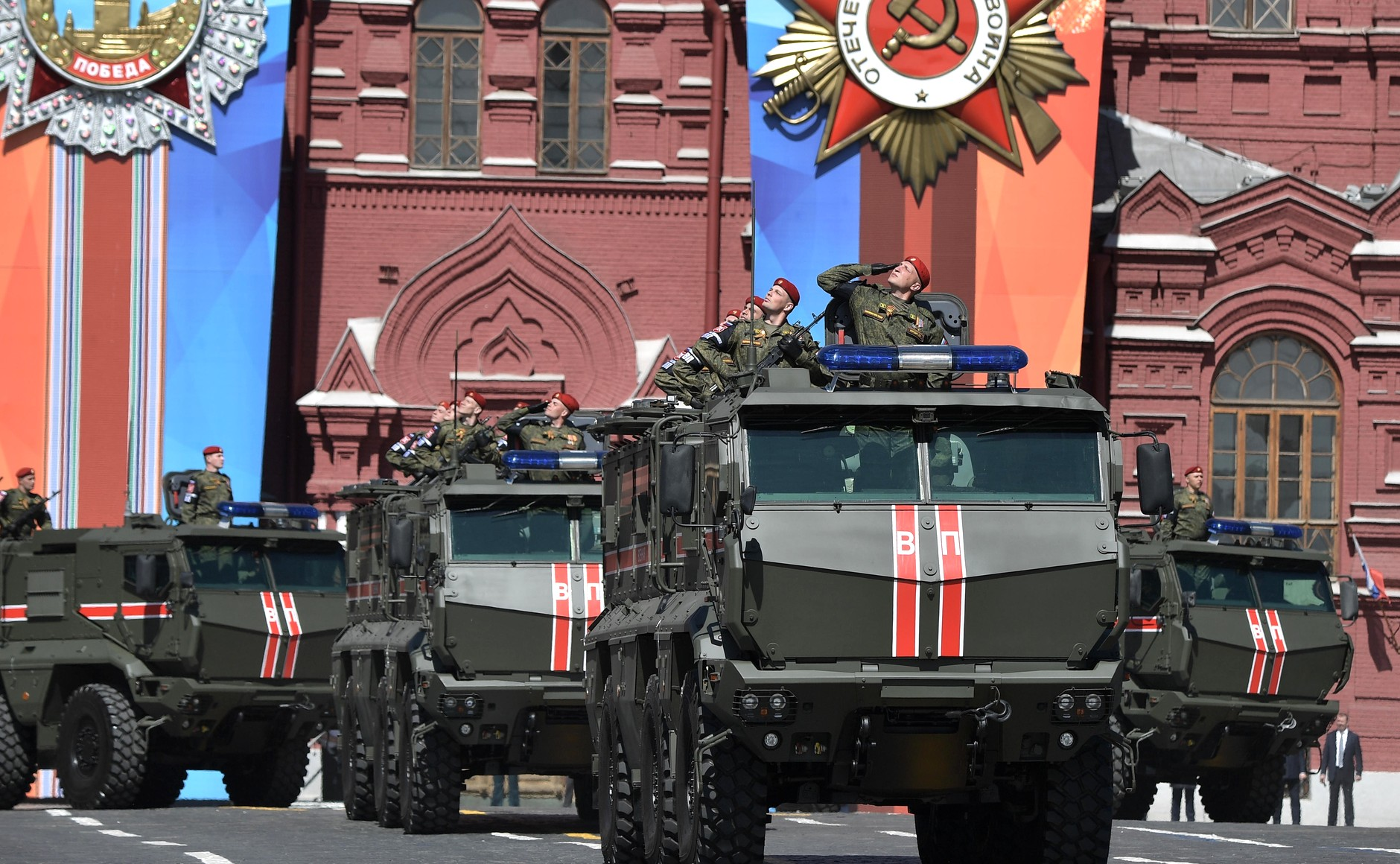
Kamaz Typhoon

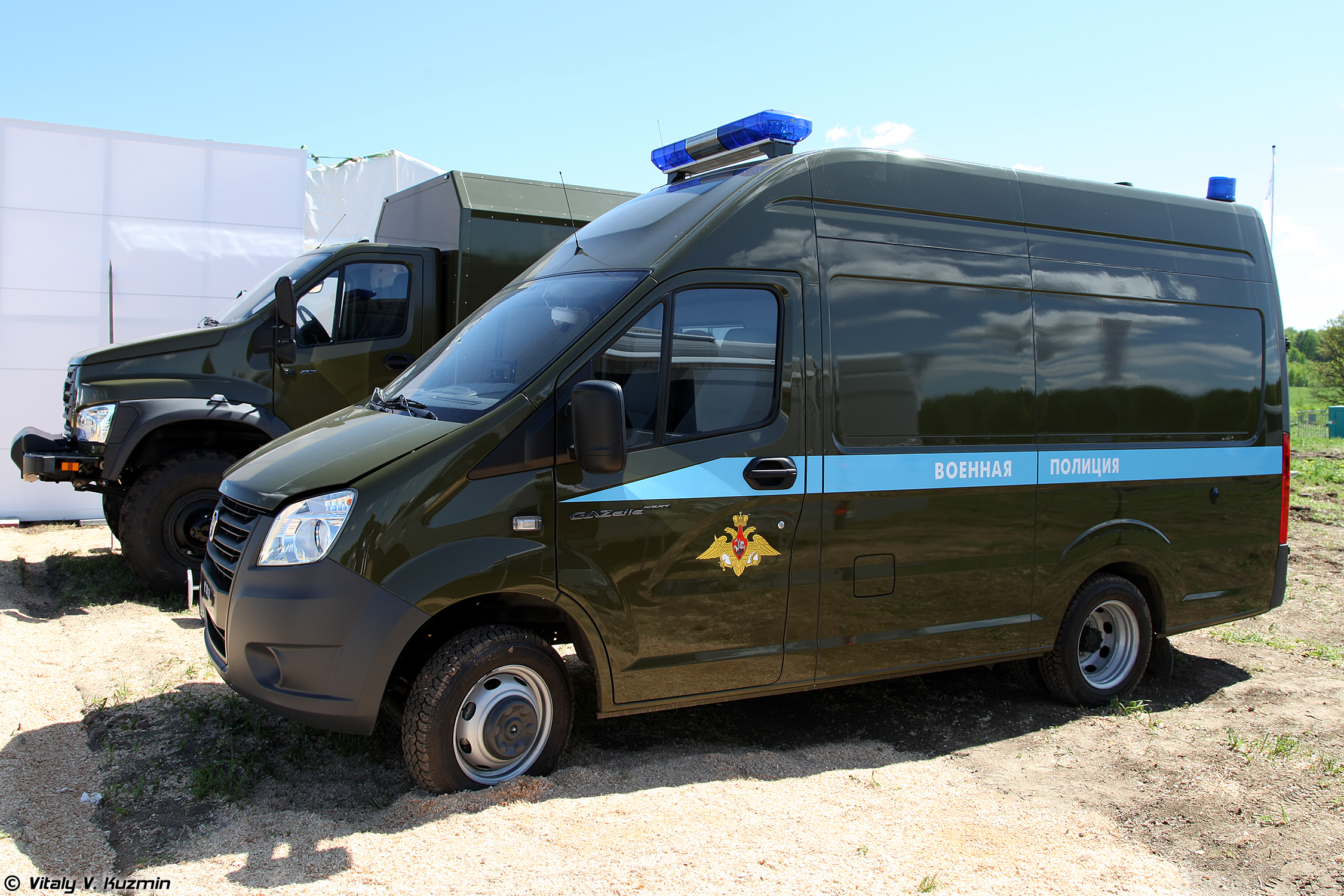
Military police GAZelle NEXT car

=== Role ===
In the Russian Federation, Military police officers often provided disaster relief and internal security, while still fulfilling their fundamental function of maintaining discipline and security within the Army.

The Military Police is usually responsible for the investigation of crimes, such as crimes against property and crimes against persons except murder and rape (handled by the FSB) committed on a military installation, but they may investigate other crimes in certain circumstances.

== Education ==
Officers of the Military Police are trained within the framework of advanced training and the retraining of officers who finished combined-arms, engineering and command schools. In 2017, the Moscow Higher Combined Arms Command School recruited a company of cadets who will be trained in the profile of the Military Police.

On December 1, 2017, the Training Center of the Military Police of the Ministry of Defense of the Russian Federation was opened in Vladikavkaz to train new specialists and improve the qualifications of the current staff.

== History ==
=== Russian Empire ===
Peter the Great's military statute of 1716 established the post of a general-gevaldiger. It was the highest military policeman in Imperial Russian Army. Regiment's rumormeisters were subordinate to him. In 1864, this post was abolished during the military reforms of Alexander II.

Until 1917, the Special Corps of Gendarmes exercised the functions of military police in the Russian Empire. On 19 March 1917, Special Corps of Gendarmes was disbanded by the Russian Provisional Government Decree.

=== Soviet Union ===
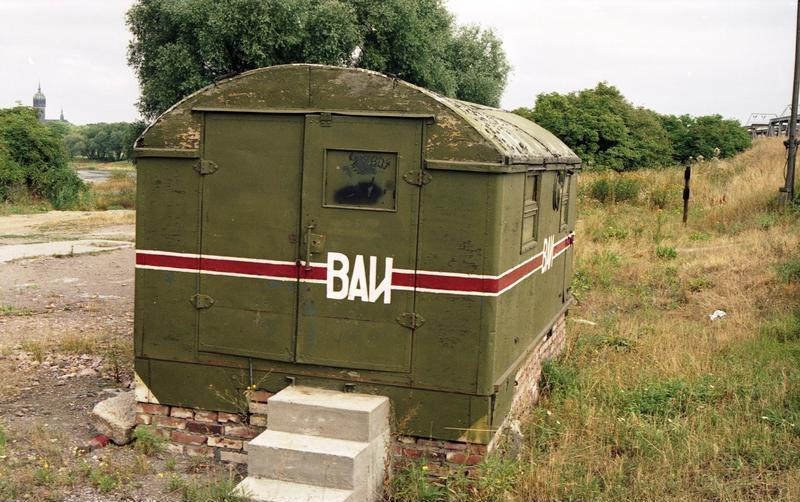
Former Soviet Army ВАИ checkpoint located in Wittenberg, Wächterhäuschen, Germany

The Soviet Armed Forces did not have any units technically named 'military police'. Two separate agencies handled military police duties on a day-to-day basis. The Komendantskaya sluzhba or "Commandant's Service" of the Soviet Army wore a yellow letter "K" on a red patch on the sleeve to indicate their membership of this service—the de facto army police. A second organisation called the Military Automobile Inspection existed within the Rear Services. Traffic Regulators served to control military highway and motor vehicle traffic. Traffic Regulators also wear a white painted helmet with red stripes to indicate their status and either an armband or patch with the Cyrillic letter "P" (R).

=== Russian Federation ===
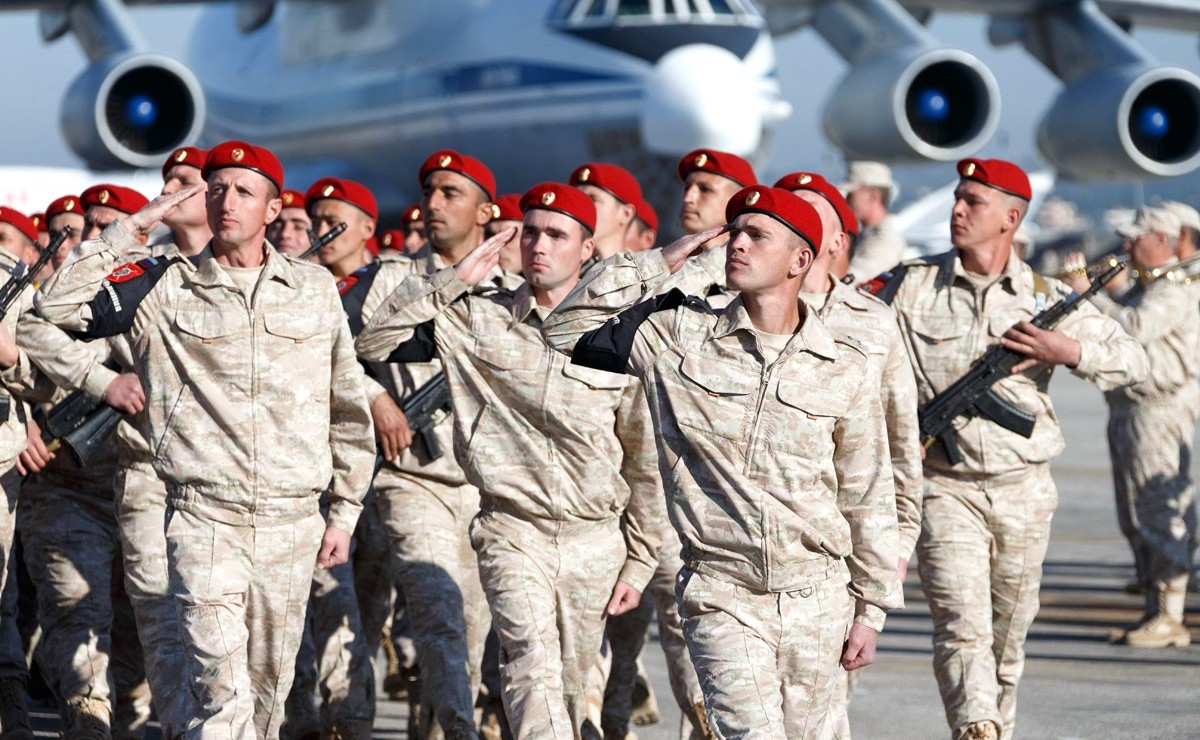
A detachment of military police at the Khmeimim Air Base. Syria, 11 December 2017

Russian Armed Forces inherited the Commandant's Service and the Military Automobile Inspection from Soviet Armed Forces.

The idea to create military police in the Russian Federation came from the second President of Russia, Vladimir Putin, who authorized his then Defence Minister, Sergey Ivanov to establish such an organization. In 2005, human rights ombudsman Vladimir Lukin wrote a special report about abuse in the armed forces and proposed measures including the creation of military police.

On 21 April 2010, when Minister of Defence Anatoly Serdyukov announced further steps to establish military police, pursuant to the President's directive. Russian President Medvedev was a strong proponent of the creation of military police; one of its main objectives would be to combat Dedovshchina or hazing. In April 2012 Chief Military Prosecutor Sergei Fridinsky said Russia's military police will be instituted in two stages: first, the integration of the relevant Defence Ministry services (the Commandant's Service and the Military Automobile Inspection) and second, granting the new agency investigative functions.

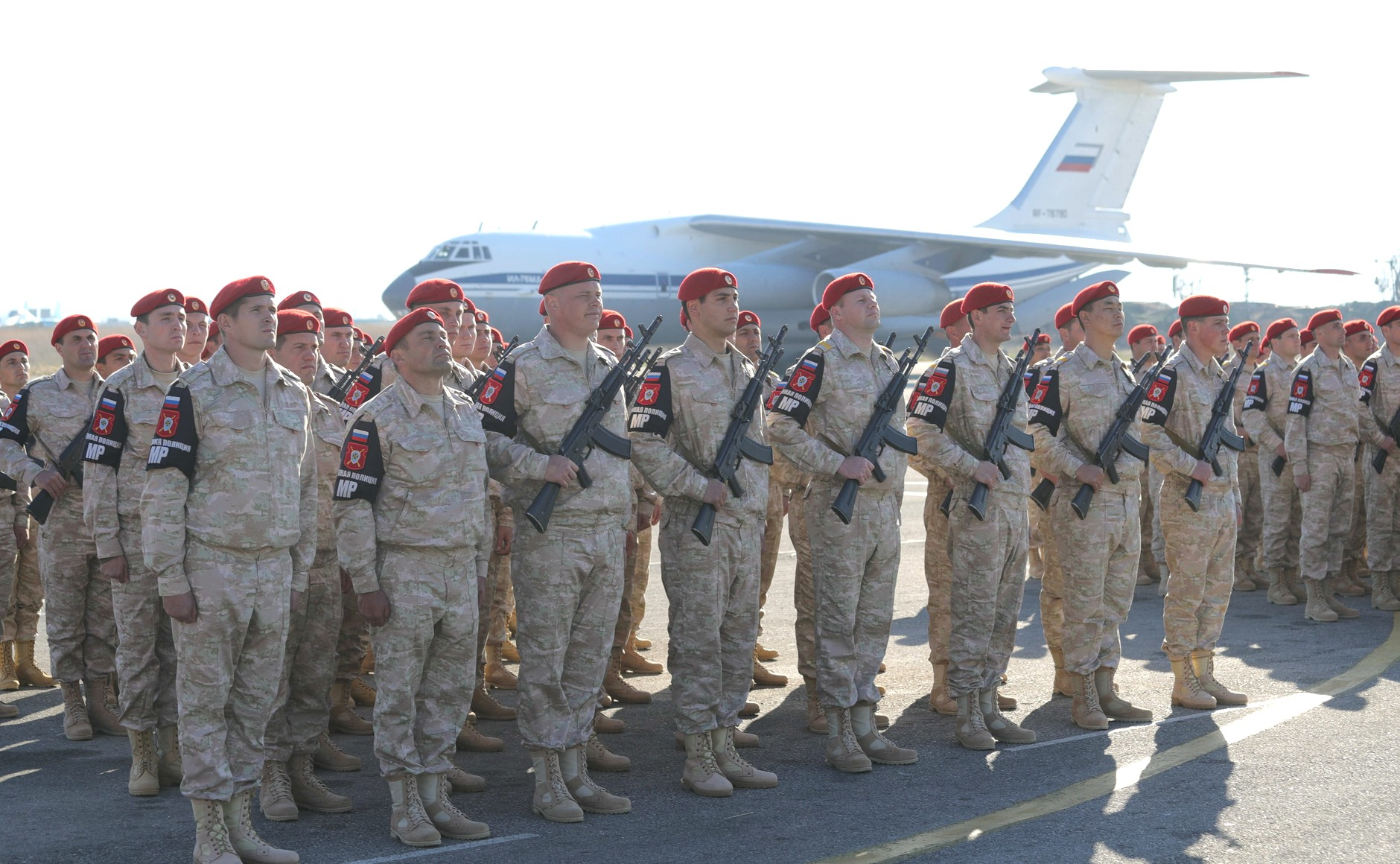
Russian Military Police at Khmeimim Air Base in Syria, 2017

According to Russian media reports, up to 20,000 service members may be assigned to serve as military police.

On 19 November 2012 it was reported by Major General Andrei Nechayev to RIA Novosti that the military police have already been created and are functional within the scope of tasks. The Defence Ministry has until the end of 2014 to complete formation of the new service.

In early February 2014 Russian President Vladimir Putin signed into law the Law on Military Police, the State Duma adopted on 24 January and approved by the Federation Council on 29 January. During consideration of the bill in the lower house of the parliament, presidential envoy to the State Duma Garry Minkh explained that military police has already been created and running, but its activities are governed by departmental orders. President's initiative is aimed at strengthening the legal framework of the force. On 27 March 2015, Russian President approved the Official Charter of the military police of the Russian Federation. Russian military police were deployed to Syria in December 2016 and February 2017 to help Syrian government to maintain the law and order in captured Aleppo and protect Russian military personnel. Four battalions of the Russian military police are carrying out tasks in the Syrian de-escalation zones as of 26 July 2017.

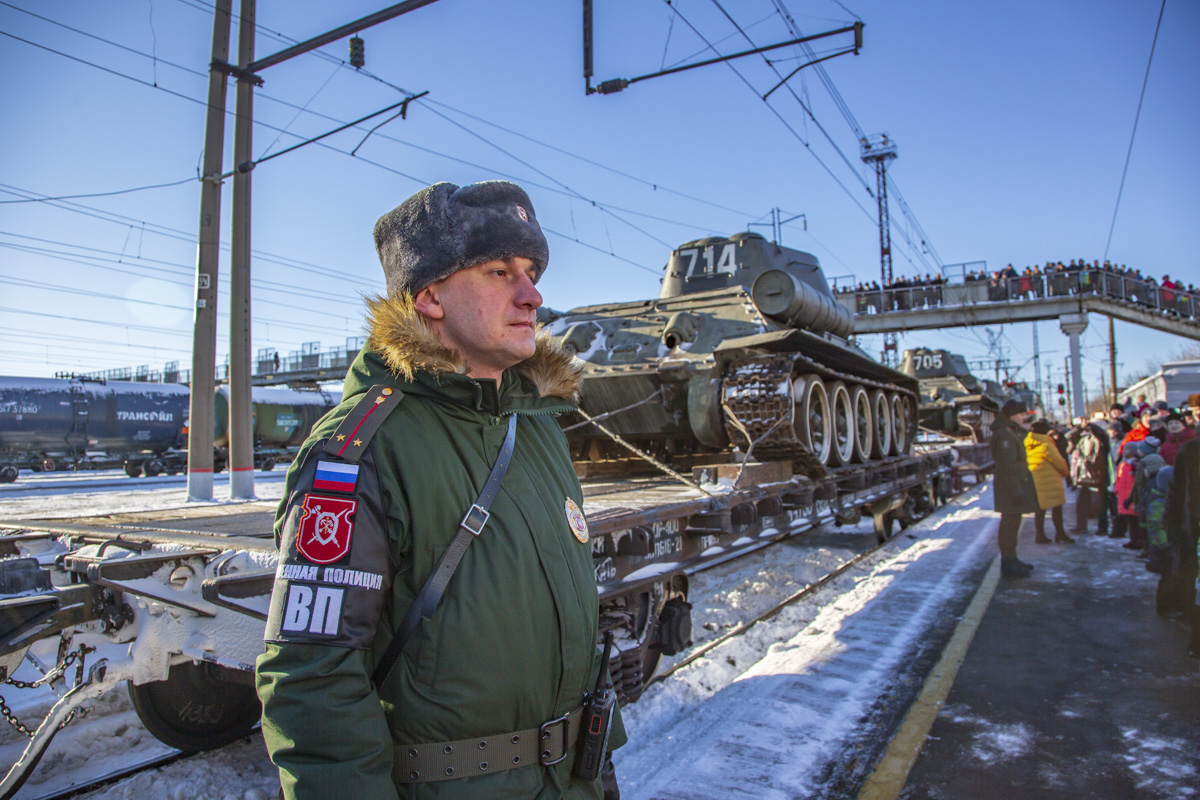
A military policeman near the echelon of T-34-85 tanks brought from Laos. 19 January 2019

On 20 September 2017, the Russian General Staff said jihadist militants tried to capture a 29-man unit of the Russian military police back on the night of 18 September, whom were monitoring the ceasefire in the Idlib de-escalation zone. The trapped unit fought for several hours before being successfully rescued in a joint Syrian-Russian special operation. The Russian ministry stated that according to their intelligence, the rebels' ″offensive was initiated by the US special agencies in order to stop successful advance of the Syrian Arab Army to the east from Deir ez-Zor″. In response to the unprovoked attack, Russian and Syrian forces led a counterattack which killed some 850 militants by 21 September.

During the 5th Northwestern Syria offensive, the city of Saraqib changed hands a few times between the Syrian government forces and Turkish backed rebel proxies and their allies before the Syrian Army fully captured it on 1 March 2020. The following day on 2 March, the Russian Reconciliation Centre in Syria announced that Russian Military Police had been deployed there to ensure security of the city.

Military units of the Military Police of the Russian Federation participated in the Russian invasion of Ukraine.

== Insignia ==
Servicemen of the military police wear the same uniforms as the rest of the Russian Armed Forces (including full dress, service and battle dress).

Signs of special distinction of military police officers are: red beret with the DUI of the National Police, as well as a black armband with the words "ВОЕННАЯ ПОЛИЦИЯ" (Military Police) and the abbreviation "ВП" for domestic deployment or the Latin alphabet "MP" for deployment outside Russia.

Military Police servicemen of fleets are in uniform clothing, provided for naval infantry, but with the red beret (instead of black) and the black shoulder patch.

Military Police Emblems

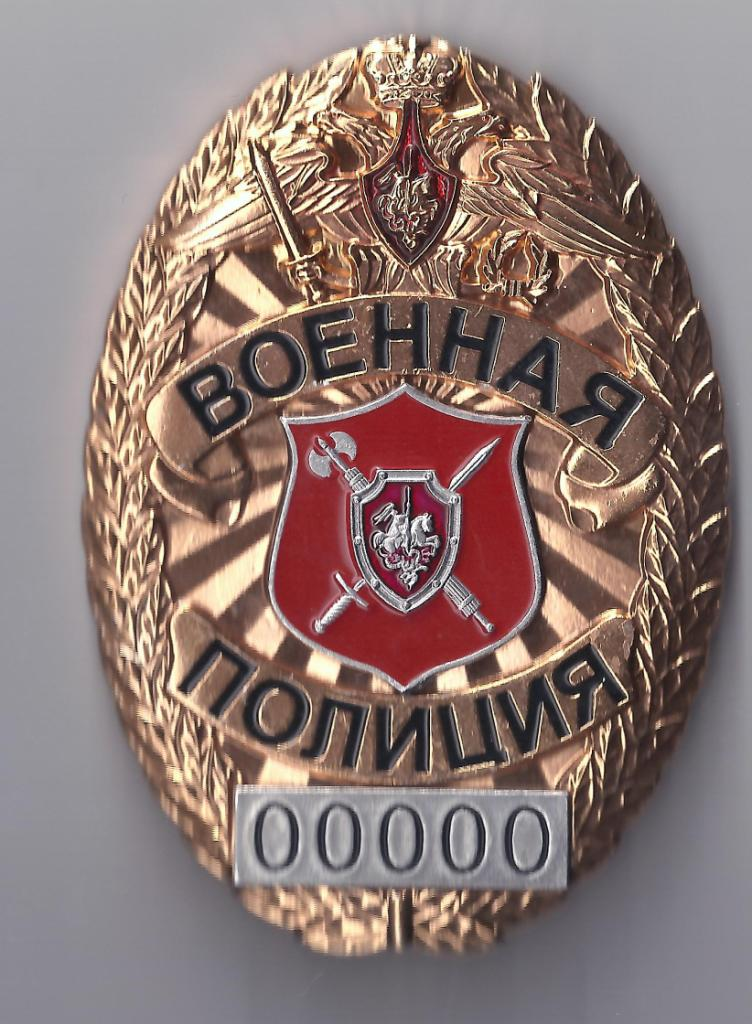
Official badge, 2013

Moscow Region Military Police Patch

== Chiefs of Military Police ==
- Major General Andrei Nechayev (2011–2013)
- Major General Igor Sidorkevich (2013–2016)
- Lieutenant General Vladimir Ivanovskiy (2016–2019)
- Colonel General Sergey Kuralenko (Since 2020)

== See also ==
- Military police
