= Jaruga, Bosansko Grahovo =

Jaruga Јаруга
- Village
- Location within Bosnia and Herzegovina
- Coordinates: 44°04′14″N 16°36′04″E
- Country: Bosnia and Herzegovina
- Entity: Federation of Bosnia and Herzegovina
- Canton: Canton 10
- Municipality: Bosansko Grahovo

Area
  - Total: 5.79 km^{2} (2.24 sq mi)

Population (2013)
  - Total: 7
  - Density: 1.2/km^{2} (3.1/sq mi)
- Time zone: UTC+1 (CET)
  - Summer (DST): UTC+2 (CEST)

Jaruga (Serbian Cyrillic: Јаруга) is a village in the Municipality of Bosansko Grahovo in Canton 10 of the Federation of Bosnia and Herzegovina, an entity of Bosnia and Herzegovina.

== Demographics ==
According to the 2013 census, its population was 7.

Ethnicity in 2013
Ethnicity	Number	Percentage
Serbs	6	85.7%
Bosniaks	1	14.3%
Total	7	100%

== Bibliography ==
- Ethnicity/National Affiliation, Religion and Mother Tongue (PDF). Sarajevo: Agency for Statistics of Bosnia and Herzegovina. 2019.
