= Krinichnoye =

Krinichnoye Криничное
- Khutor
- Location within Belgorod Oblast Location within Russia
- Coordinates: 50°27′N 37°33′E
- Country: Russia
- Region: Belgorod Oblast
- District: Volokonovsky District
- Time zone: UTC+3:00

Krinichnoye (Russian: Криничное) is a rural locality (a khutor) in Volokonovsky District, Belgorod Oblast, Russia. The population was 42 as of 2010. There is 1 street.

== Geography ==
Krinichnoye is located 9 km southwest of Volokonovka (the district's administrative centre) by road.
