= Verkhneye Turovo =

Verkhneye Turovo Верхнее Турово
- Selo
- Location within Voronezh Oblast Location within Russia
- Coordinates: 51°37′N 38°36′E
- Country: Russia
- Region: Voronezh Oblast
- District: Nizhnedevitsky District
- Time zone: UTC+3:00

Verkhneye Turovo (Russian: Верхнее Турово) is a rural locality (a selo) and the administrative center of Verkhneturovskoye Rural Settlement, Nizhnedevitsky District, Voronezh Oblast, Russia. The population was 1,384 as of 2018. There are 18 streets.

== Geography ==
Verkhneye Turovo is located 25 km northeast of Nizhnedevitsk (the district's administrative centre) by road. Kurbatovo is the nearest rural locality.
