= Yaruha =

Rural settlement in Vinnytsia Oblast, Ukraine

Yaruha Яруга
- Rural settlement
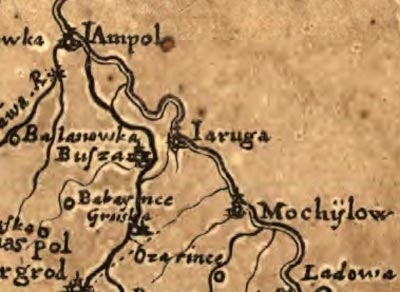
- Beauplan's 1648 map showing the Yaruha area

- Location within Vinnytsia Oblast Location within Ukraine
- Coordinates: 48.3331°N 28.0422°E
- Country: Ukraine
- Oblast: Vinnytsia Oblast
- Raion: Mohyliv-Podilskyi Raion
- Time zone: UTC+2 (EET)
  - Summer (DST): UTC+3 (EEST)

Yaruha (Yiddish: יערע, romanized: Yara; Romanian: Iaruga; Polish: Jaruga) is a rural settlement in southern Ukraine located on the Dniester River. It is close to the Moldovan-Ukrainian border.

It was the site of engagement in the Polish–Soviet War.
