= Encyklopedia PWN =

Encyklopedia PWN can refer to several encyclopedias published by Polish publisher Państwowe Wydawnictwo Naukowe:

- Wielka Encyklopedia Powszechna PWN, published from 1962 to 1970
- Wielka Encyklopedia PWN, published from 2001 to 2005
- Internetowa encyklopedia PWN, free internet encyclopedia
