= List of encyclopedias in Polish =

This is a list of encyclopedias written in the Polish language.

Printed (paper)
Digital (online)
Both*

*This usually means that volumes of the encyclopaedia were originally printed on paper, but at some point (usually in the 1990s or early 2000s), the encyclopaedia has been digitised and made available in whole or in part in electronic form (usually online, but not necessarily). New entries may or may not be added, while old entries (originally printed) may or may not be updated. Usually, publication of paper-printed editions has been discontinued.

Title in Polish	Title in English	Volumes	Published
Encyklopedia Britannica: Edycja polska	Encyclopædia Britannica: Polish Edition	49 vols	1997–2005
Encyklopedia Białych Plam	Encyclopaedia of "White Spots"	20 vols	2000–2008
Encyklopedia Internautica	Encyclopedia Internautica		1999–2026
Encyklopedia nowej generacji E2.0	E2.0 Encyclopaedia of the New Generation	1 vol	2008 (Note: A single-volume book and a CD-ROM. The online version redirects to pwn.pl. "E2.0 Next Generation Encyclopedia". e2.0.pwn.pl (in Polish)..)
Encyklopedia ogólna wiedzy ludzkiej	General Encyclopaedia of Human Knowledge	12 vols	1872–1877
Encyklopedia podręczna ilustrowana (Note: Full title: Encyklopedia podręczna ilustrowana według 2 najnowszego wydania "Macierzy Polskiej" we Lwowie, uzupełniona i opracowana do użytku naszych czytelników.)	Illustrated Reference Encyclopaedia	4 vols	1906
Encyklopedia Polski	Encyclopaedia of Poland		1996
Encyklopedia popularna ilustrowana (Note: Full title: Encyklopedia popularna ilustrowana treść wszystkich gałęzi wiedzy ludzkiej, podana przystępnie.)	Popular Illustrated Encyclopaedia	4 vols	1909–1912
Encyklopedia powszechna kieszonkowa	Pocket Universal Encyclopaedia		1887–1891
Encyklopedia Powszechna PWN	Universal Encyclopaedia of PWN	4 vols	1973–1976
Encyklopedia Powszechna PWN	Universal Encyclopaedia of PWN	30 vols	2009–2010
Encyklopedia Powszechna Ultima Thule	Universal Encyclopaedia Ultima Thule	10 vols	1927–1939
Encyklopedia sportów świata (Note: Originally published in Polish in 2001; translated and published in English in 2003 and in French in 2005.)	World Sports Encyclopedia		2001–2005
Encyklopedia staropolska ilustrowana (Gloger)	Gloger's Illustrated Encyclopaedia of Old Polish	4 vols	1900–1903
Encyklopedia staropolska Brücknera	Brückner's Encyclopaedia of Old Polish	2 vols	1937–1939
Wielka Encyklopedia PWN	Great Encyclopaedia of PWN	31 vols	2001–2005
Wielka Encyklopedia Powszechna PWN	Great Universal Encyclopaedia of PWN	12 vols	1962–1970
Ilustrowana encyklopedia Trzaski, Everta i Michalskiego	The Illustrated Encyclopaedia of Trzaska, Evert and Michalski	6 vols	1925–1938
Internetowa encyklopedia PWN (Note: Also referred to as Nowa Encyklopedia Powszechna PWN; a free Internet encyclopedia published by PWN.)	Internet PWN Encyclopaedia		2001–2026
Nowa Encyklopedia Powszechna PWN	New Universal Encyclopaedia of PWN	6 vols	1995–1996
Nowe Ateny (Note: Full title: Nowe Ateny Albo Akademiia Wszelkiej Sciencyi Pełna, Na Różne Tytuły Jak Na Classes Podzielona, Mądrym Dla Memoryjału, Idiotom Dla Nauki, Politykom Dla Praktyki, Melankolikom Dla Rozrywki Erygowana. The book uses the Polish language as the main text, and primarily Latin for the in-line references.)	New Athens		1745–1764
Popularna encyklopedia powszechna	Popular Universal Encyclopaedia	20 vols	1994–2000
Encyklopedia popularna PWN	Popular Encyclopaedia of PWN		1980–2020 (Note: The 2011 digital edition was distributed by CD-ROM.)
S.Orgelbranda Encyklopedia Powszechna: Orgelbrand's Universal Encyclopedia (1859) edition I (1859–1868); Orgelbrand's Universal Encyclopedia (1872) edition II (1872–1876); Orgelbrand's Universal Encyclopedia (1898) edition III (1898)	Orgelbrand's Universal Encyclopedia	28 vols	1859–1898
Słownik geograficzny Królestwa Polskiego	Geographical Dictionary of the Kingdom of Poland		1880–1902
Wielka encyklopedia Oxford	The Great Oxford Encyclopaedia	20 vols	2008
Wielka encyklopedia powszechna ilustrowana	The Great Universal Illustrated Encyclopaedia	55 vols	1890–1914
Wielka ilustrowana encyklopedia powszechna	The Great Illustrated Universal Encyclopaedia	20 vols	1929–1938
WIEM Encyklopedia; Wielka Interaktywna Encyklopedia Multimedialna	WIEM Encyclopaedia; Great Interactive Multimedia Encyclopaedia	9 vols	1998–2026
Zbiór potrzebniejszych wiadomości	A Collection of Essential Information	2 vols	1781–1783
Wikipedia Polskojęzyczna	Polish Wikipedia		2001–present
