= Karol Kuryluk =

Polish journalist, editor, activist, politician and diplomat

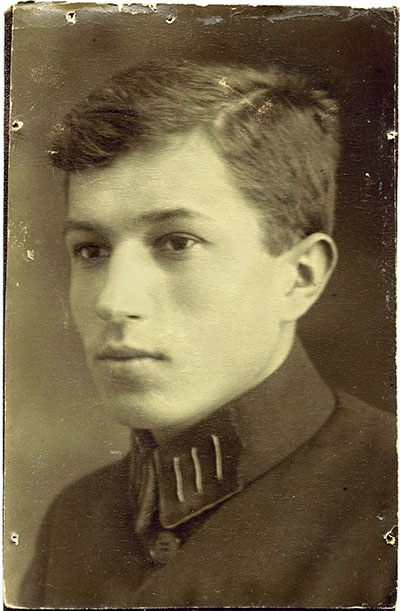
A high school portrait of Karol Kuryluk, 1928

Karol Kuryluk (27 October 1910 – 9 December 1967) was a Polish journalist, editor, activist, politician and diplomat. In 2002, he was honored by Yad Vashem for saving Jews in the Holocaust.

== Biography ==
Kuryluk was born on 27 October 1910 in Zbaraż (Zbarazh), a small town in Galicia, the eastern province of the Austro-Hungarian Empire (after World War I part of Poland, today in Ukraine), and died in Budapest. He was the eldest son of Franciszek Kuryluk, a mason, and Łucja, née Pańczyszak. He had four brothers (two of them died in early childhood) and five sisters.

In 1930, after finishing high school in his native town, Kuryluk received a small scholarship to study Polish language at the University of Lviv in the former capital of the Austro-Hungarian province of Galicia and a multicultural metropolis (Poles, Jews, Ukrainians, Armenians, Belarusians, Germans and Tatars). He was multilingual (Polish, Ukrainian, Russian and German), and during his studies he supported himself and helped his family back home by giving private lessons.

In 1931, Kuryluk met the writer and philanthropist Halina Górska and became involved in her social care project Akcja Błękitnych (Action of the Blue Knights), distributing food and clothing to slum children and helping to run shelters for homeless boys. At the University, he protested against the "bench ghetto", set up by the nationalists to separate Poles and Jews in the lecture halls, and he sided with Jewish and Ukrainian students who were harassed and beaten up by the Endecja gangs.

He married Miriam Kohany, a poet, writer and translator who during the war changed her name to Maria Grabowska and published under the name of Maria Kuryluk. They had two children, Ewa Kuryluk, an artist and writer, and Piotr Kuryluk, a translator.

In September 1967, Kuryluk suffered a heart attack. He flew to a book fair in Budapest against his doctor's advice and died there on 9 December 1967.

Kuryluk is buried together with his wife and son at the Powązki Military Cemetery in a tomb designed by Ewa Kuryluk.

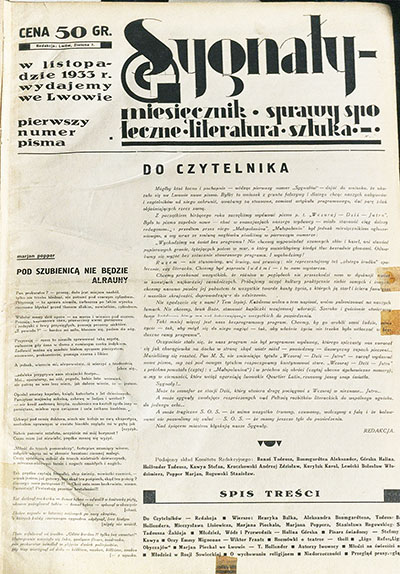
The front page of the first issue of Sygnały magazine, November 1933.

== Literary career ==
In 1933, Kuryluk founded the cultural periodical Sygnały (Signals Magazine) with the poet Tadeusz Hollender and became its editor-in-chief. He called upon the young literary talent in the city (Erwin Axer, Stanisław Jerzy Lec, Czesław Miłosz, Mirosław Żuławski), won over established writers from all over the country (Maria Dąbrowska, Bruno Schulz, Leopold Staff, Andrzej Strug, Julian Tuwim), and published translations of writings by foreign authors (Appolinaire, Henri Barbusse, André Malraux, Carl von Ossietzky, Bertrand Russell, Upton Sinclair, Paul Valéry). Special issues were dedicated to Jewish, Ukrainian and Belarusian culture, and to the city of Lwów.

Signals promoted the work of contemporary Polish artists (Henryk Gotlib, Bruno Schulz, Zygmunt Waliszewski) and avant-garde photographers (Otto Hahn, Mieczysław Szczuka), and popularized modern European art (van Gogh, Gauguin, Archipenko, Max Ernst). A group of gifted graphic artists and caricaturists (K. Baraniecki, F. Kleinmann, Eryk Lipiński, Franciszek Parecki) collaborated with the magazine, which was renowned for its biting humor and merciless derision of Hitler, Mussolini, Franco and the Polish anti-Semites, but also of Stalin. By mid-thirties, Signals had become a leading periodical of the leftist Polish intelligentsia.

In 1938, an armed gang of ONR (National Radical Camp) raided the editorial office and Kuryluk barely escaped being killed. Yet, he managed to continue publishing Signals, despite financial hardship, ongoing censorship and vicious political attacks, until the outbreak of World War II. The last issue came out in August 1939. In September 1939, after the Soviet annexation of Lwów, Kuryluk deposited his "Signals" archive at the Ossolineum Library (now Stefanyk Library) where it has survived until now. Kuryluk was offered a job at Czerwony Sztandar (Red Flag), a Soviet-sponsored newspaper, but soon lost it because of the poem "Today Stalin called me" by Tadeusz Hollender published in Signals.

In 1965, he became the director of the PWN Science Publisher, publishing the Big PWN Encyclopedia. When the volume with the entry on Nazi Camps was released, a storm broke out. The entry contained the factual information about the Nazi Camps being divided into concentration camps and extermination camp (for Jews). This division, however, was used as a pretext to attack the Encyclopedia editors. The Party's nationalist faction insinuated that they were all Jews, accused them of "historical treachery that would rob the Polish people of their justified war suffering," and organized street demonstrations to protest "the Zionist plot."

== Political career ==
From July 1941 to July 1944, during the Nazi occupation of Lwów, Kuryluk was part of the resistance on both sides of the political divide. As member of PPR (Polish Workers Party), he was responsible for its clandestine radio station and publishing activities. But he was also involved in the news service and publications of the AK (Home Army of the London government in exile).

In August 1944, Kuryluk moved from Lwów to Lublin and began to publish "Odrodzenie" ("The Renaissance"). The magazine was intended as a revival of "Signals" and the first issue commemorated writers and artists killed by the Nazis, publishing a long list of victims, including Bruno Schulz, whom the underground tried to save. In 1945, he moved with his magazine to Cracow, and in 1947 to Warsaw. Among the contributors to "Odrodzenie" counted the future Nobel Prize laureates Czesław Miłosz and Wisława Szymborska, the novelist Tadeusz Konwicki and the poet Tadeusz Różewicz.

After the Kielce pogrom in July 1946, the taboo topic of anti-Semitism's rise in postwar Poland was addressed by "Odrodzenie". However, with the Soviet's firm grip on power and Stalinism on the move, Kuryluk was quickly losing what had remained of his relative independence. In February 1948, he resigned from "Odrodzenie" and worked first in the literary section of the Polish Radio and later in publishing.

=== Minister of Culture ===
From April 1956 to April 1958, Kuryluk was Minister of Culture in the government of Józef Cyrankiewicz and used his term to liberalize culture, and to open it to the West. The French Institute opened in Warsaw (the first lecturer was Michel Foucault), theater and movie stars (Laurence Olivier, Vivien Leigh, Gérard Philipe, Yves Montand) came to visit and to perform; western books and films, avant-garde music and art became available, the first exhibit by Henry Moore was arranged. New galleries and publications sprung up all over the country and a group of young Wrocław journalists founded, but soon had to stop publishing, "Signals II".

In the spring of 1957, Kuryluk was part of a government delegation headed by the Prime Minister Cyrankiewicz. The delegation was to tour Asia to lobby for the enlarged version of the Rapacki Plan that would suit the Soviets by creating a huge block of non-aligned countries, extending from East Berlin through Poland, Mongolia, India, China, Vietnam, Burma, and Cambodia. The delegation was received by Nehru, Mao Tse-Tung, Hồ Chí Minh and Prince Sihanouk, signed everywhere with meaningless declarations of friendship, and was a complete flop.

Towards the end of 1957, the Party (PZPR) began to stop the process of liberalization. The First Secretary Gomułka was against the generous scholarship program of the Ministry of Culture, sending thousands of Polish intellectuals and artists to the West. When the writer Marek Hłasko chose freedom in Paris, this was taken as a pretext to fire Kuryluk as minister of culture, and to get him out of the country as well.

In December 1958, Kuryluk was appointed ambassador of the People's Republic of Poland to Austria. He arrived with his family on 1 January 1959 in Vienna and served until the summer of 1964.

== Honors and awards ==
A pacifist innately, he stayed away from military action and was particularly active in saving Jews. He hid Peppa Frauenglas and her two sons in his own sublet room. In 2002, he was honored by Yad Vashem as Righteous Among the Nations of the World.

== Picture gallery ==
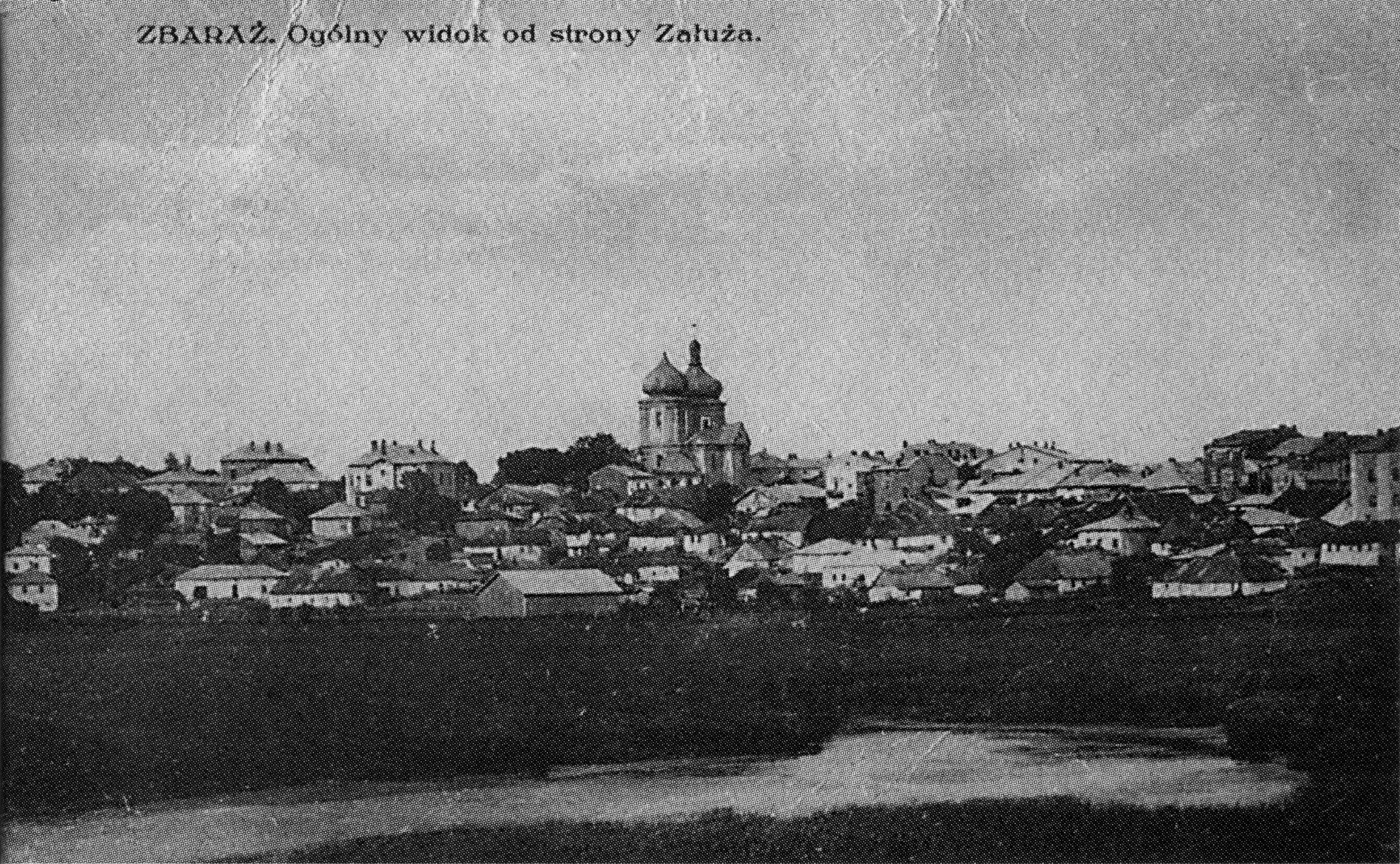
A postcard showing a general view of the town of Zbaraż, ca 1925.

A postcard showing the main square in Zbaraż, ca. 1925.

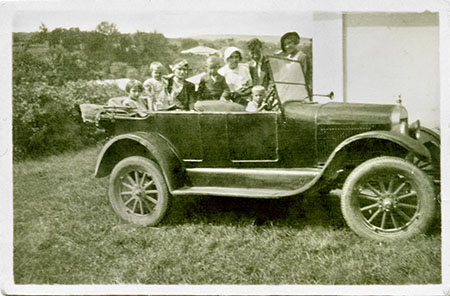
Karol Kuryluk, second from the right, with his younger siblings and friends who came to visit him in Zbaraz, 1930.

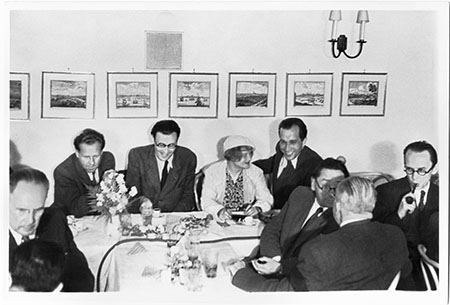
The editorial office of "Odrodzenie", in the middle Maria Dąbrowska, with Karol Kuryluk on her left, and Tadeusz Breza, Cracow, 1946.

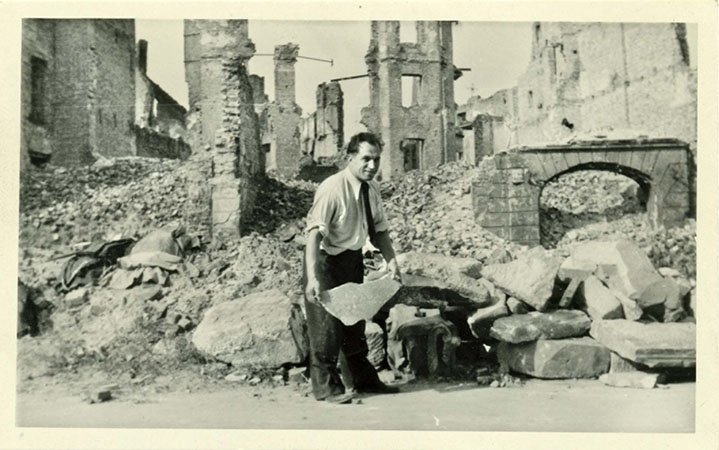
Karol Kuryluk clearing the rubble in postwar Warsaw, 1948.

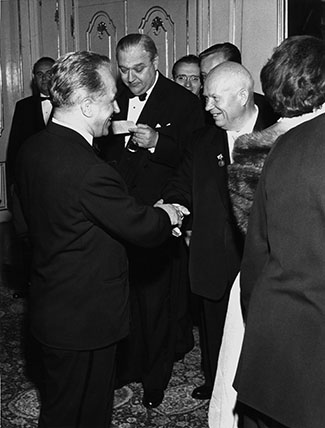
Polish ambassador to Austria Karol Kuryluk being introduced to Nikita Khrushchev during his meeting with John F. Kennedy in Vienna, 1961.
