= Kazimiera Zawistowska =

Polish poet and translator

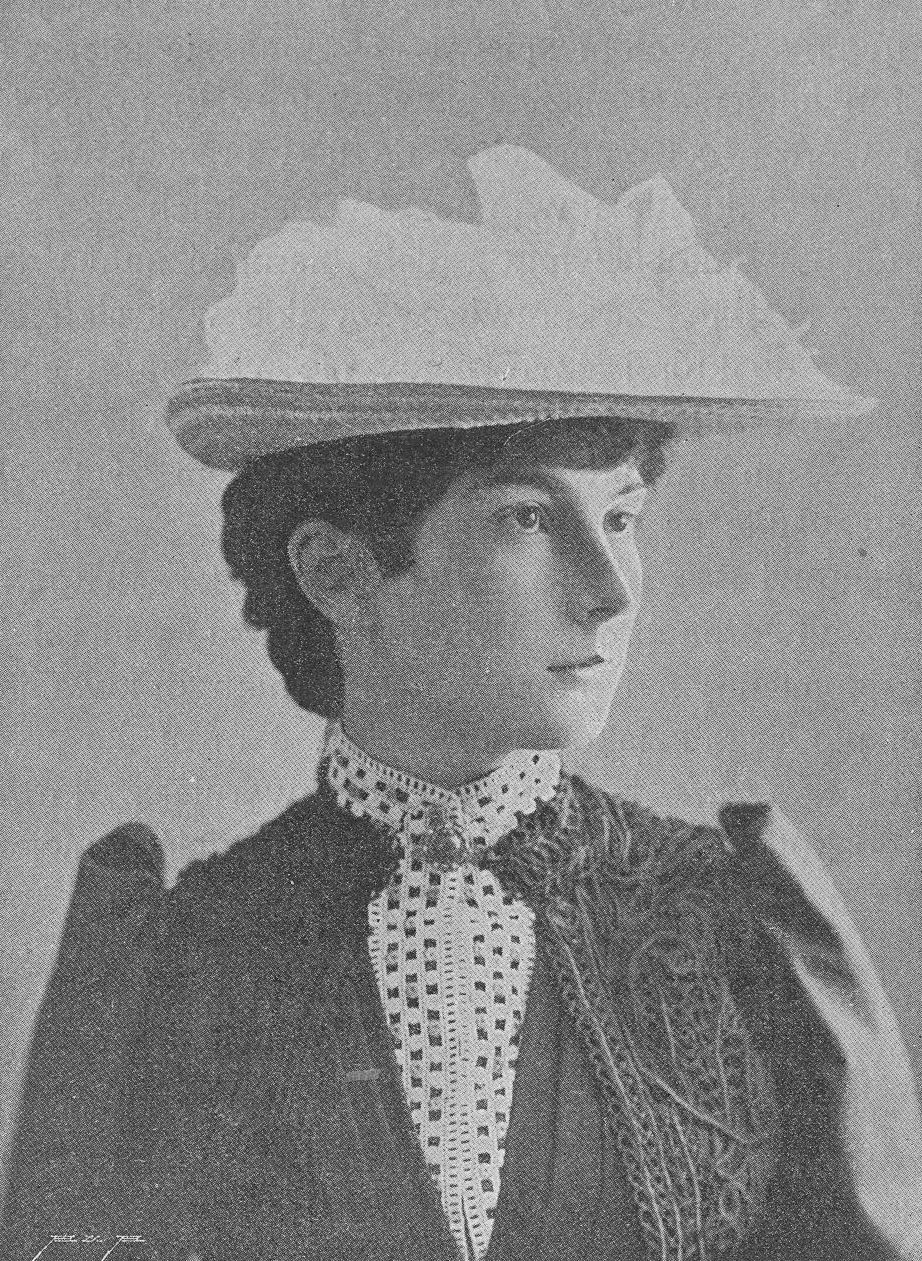
Kazimiera Zawistowska

Kazimiera Zawistowska de domo Jasieńska, pseudonym Ira, (1870–1902) was a Polish poet and translator.

Zawistowska was an author of modernist erotic and landscape poems related with mysticism, symbolism and Parnassianism. She published her works in Kraków and Warsaw magazines – Życie, Krytyka and Chimera. Zawistowska translated poems of Belgian and French symbolists, including Charles Baudelaire, Paul Verlaine, Albert Samain.

== Biography ==
Kazimiera Zawistowska was born in 1870 in Rasztowce, Podolia. After education, she moved to Switzerland and Italy. After back to Poland, she married with Stanisław Jastrzębiec-Zawistowski and lived with him in Supranówka in Podolia.

She died on 28 February 1902 in Kraków. The cause of death was probably suicide.

== Notable works ==
Collections of poems published posthumously

- Poezje (1903) – with preface written by Zenon Przesmycki
- Poezje (1923)
- Utwory zebrane (1982)

== Sources ==
- "Zawistowska Kazimiera". Internetowa encyklopedia PWN (in Polish). Wydawnictwo Naukowe PWN. Archived from the original on 2012-03-02.
- "Zawistowska Kazimiera z Jasieńskich". WIEM Encyklopedia (in Polish). Archived from the original on 2016-03-03.
