= Halina Górska =

Polish writer and communist activist

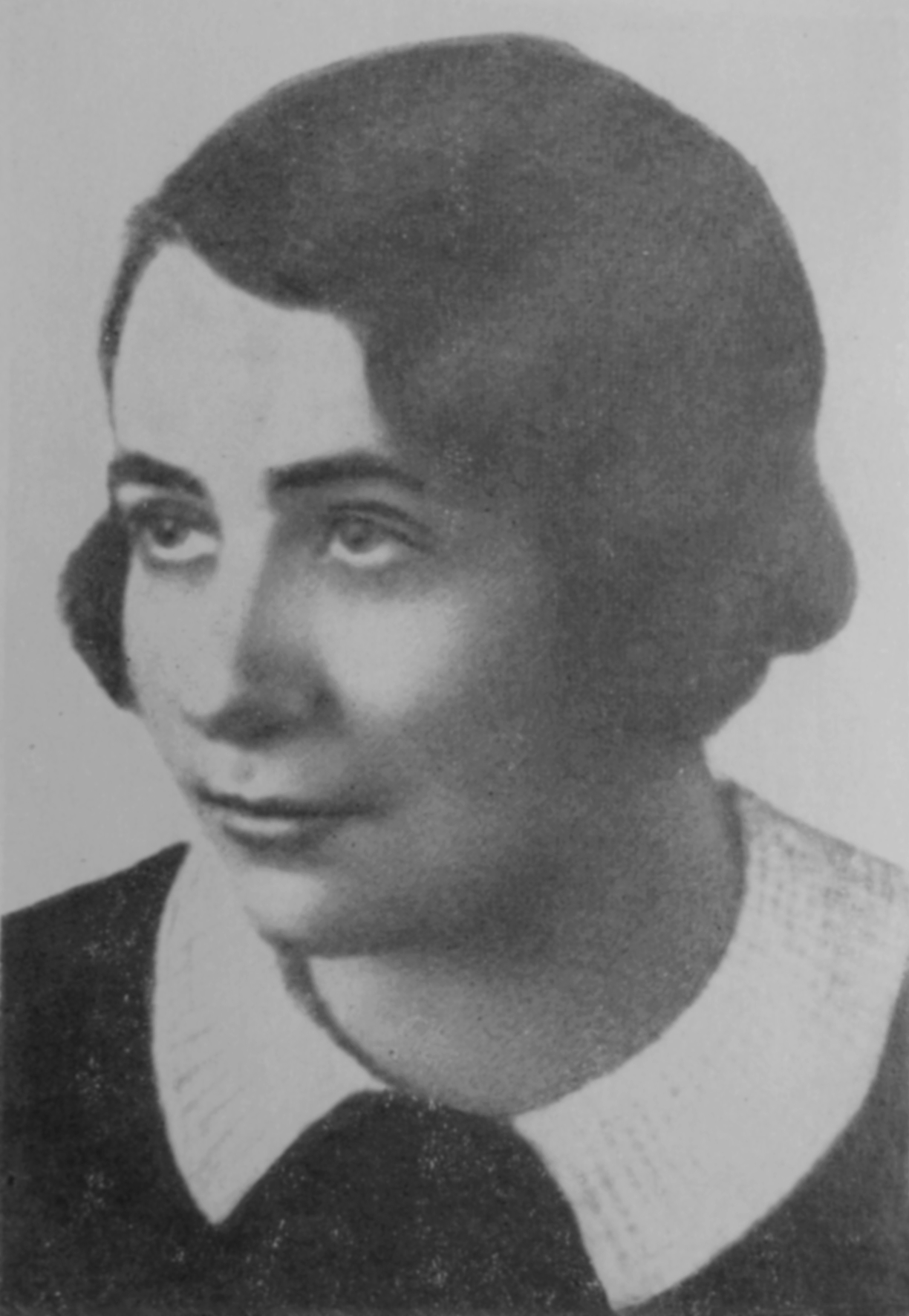

Halina Górska (14 May 1898 in Warsaw – 4 June 1942 in Lwów) was a Polish writer and a communist activist.

== Biography ==
Halina Endelman was the daughter of Zygmund and Czeslawa Endelman. She married Marian Gorski. They had one child born in 1924. She also had a granddaughter, who was born, long after she died

Beginning in 1924 Górska became associated with the Lwów literary scene. Her first publication, in 1925, was "Mam mieszkanie" (I have an apartment), in the Kurier Lwowski. In 1930 she published the fairy tale "O księciu Gotfrydzie, Rycerzu Gwiazdy Wigilijnej" (About Prince Gotfried, Knight of the Christmas Star). For many years she worked for the Lwów radio station, as a host of a special program for young adults. On her initiative, in 1931, the "Związek Błękitnych" (Blue Organization) was created, whose purpose was philanthropic activity. In 1933, together with Tadeusz Hollender and Karol Kuryluk she started the social-cultural monthly "Sygnały" (Signals). She also participated in many social movements associated with the socialists.

After Lwów was occupied by the Soviets she took up active collaboration with the communist authorities, naively believing in the truth of their slogans. However, she was the only one who abstained during voting on the incorporation of the Western Ukraine into the Soviet Union. She wrote for the magazine "Nowe Widnokręgi" (New Horizons), which published fragments of her novels. She also translated Gorky's "Mat’" (The Mother) into Polish. In 1941 she never left Lwow. In the June 1942 she was arrested by the Nazis and executed.
