= Sygnały =

Polish cultural and social magazine

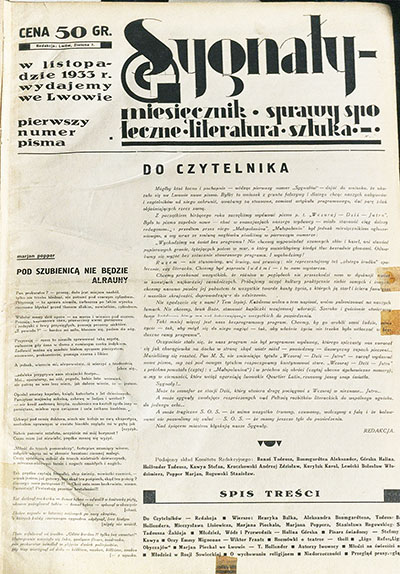
- The front page of the first issue of Sygnały magazine, November 1933
- Editor: Karol Kuryluk
- Frequency: Fortnightly
- Format: Tabloid
- First issue: November 1933
- Final issue: August 1939
- Country: Second Polish Republic
- Based in: Lwów
- Language: Polish

Sygnały Magazyn (Signals Magazine) was a Polish cultural and social magazine published 1933–1939 in Lwów (Lemberg, today Lviv, Ukraine). It was a leading periodical of the leftist Polish intelligentsia. The journal started as a 12-page monthly and was subsequently published once every two weeks, with editions of up to 32 pages. Sygnały was published in the tabloid format, similar to the New York Times at about 56x40 cm (22x16 inches).

== Editors ==
Its editor-in-chief was Karol Kuryluk, and the editorial committee included Tadeusz Banaś, Stanisława Blumenfeld, Halina Górska, Tadeusz Hollender, Anna Kowalska, Andrzej Kurczkowski and Marian Prominski.

== Polish contributors ==
Among the literary contributors from Poland figured Erwin Axer, Maria Dąbrowska, Jan Kasprowicz, Stanisław Jerzy Lec, Bruno Schulz, Leopold Staff, Andrzej Strug, Julian Tuwim, Debora Vogel and Józef Wittlin.

== International contributors ==
International literary contributors included Henri Barbusse, André Malraux, Carl von Ossietzky, Bertrand Russell, Upton Sinclair and Paul Valéry.

== Artists ==
The magazine featured reproductions of art work by Alexander Archipenko, Jan Cybis, Xawery Dunikowski, Max Ernst, Henryk Gotlib, Bronisław Linke, Maria Jarema, Bruno Schulz, Henryk Streng and Zygmunt Waliszewski; avant-garde photographs and photomontages by Otto Hahn, Jerzy Janisch, Margit Sielska and Mieczysław Szczuka; and caricatures by K. Baraniecki, F. Kleinmann, Eryk Lipiński and Franciszek Parecki.

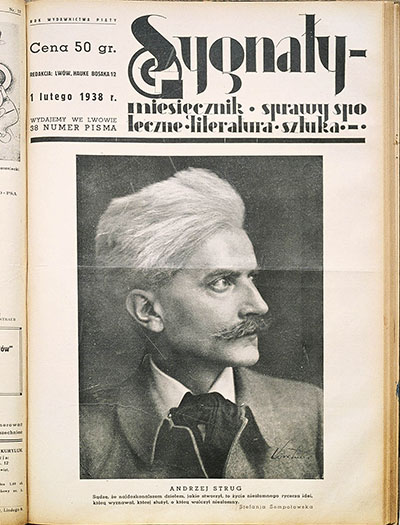
The front page of Sygnały magazine, February 1938, commemorating the death of Andrzej Strug.

== History ==
Special issues were dedicated to Jewish, Ukrainian and Belarusian culture.

In 1938 an armed ONR (National Radical Camp) gang raided the editorial office and Karol Kuryluk barely escaped alive. In spite of financial hardship and heavy censorship, he published Signals through August 1939.

In September 1939, after the Soviet annexation of Lwów, Kuryluk deposited his Signals archive at the Ossolineum Library (now Stefanyk Library) where it has survived until now.

== Picture gallery ==
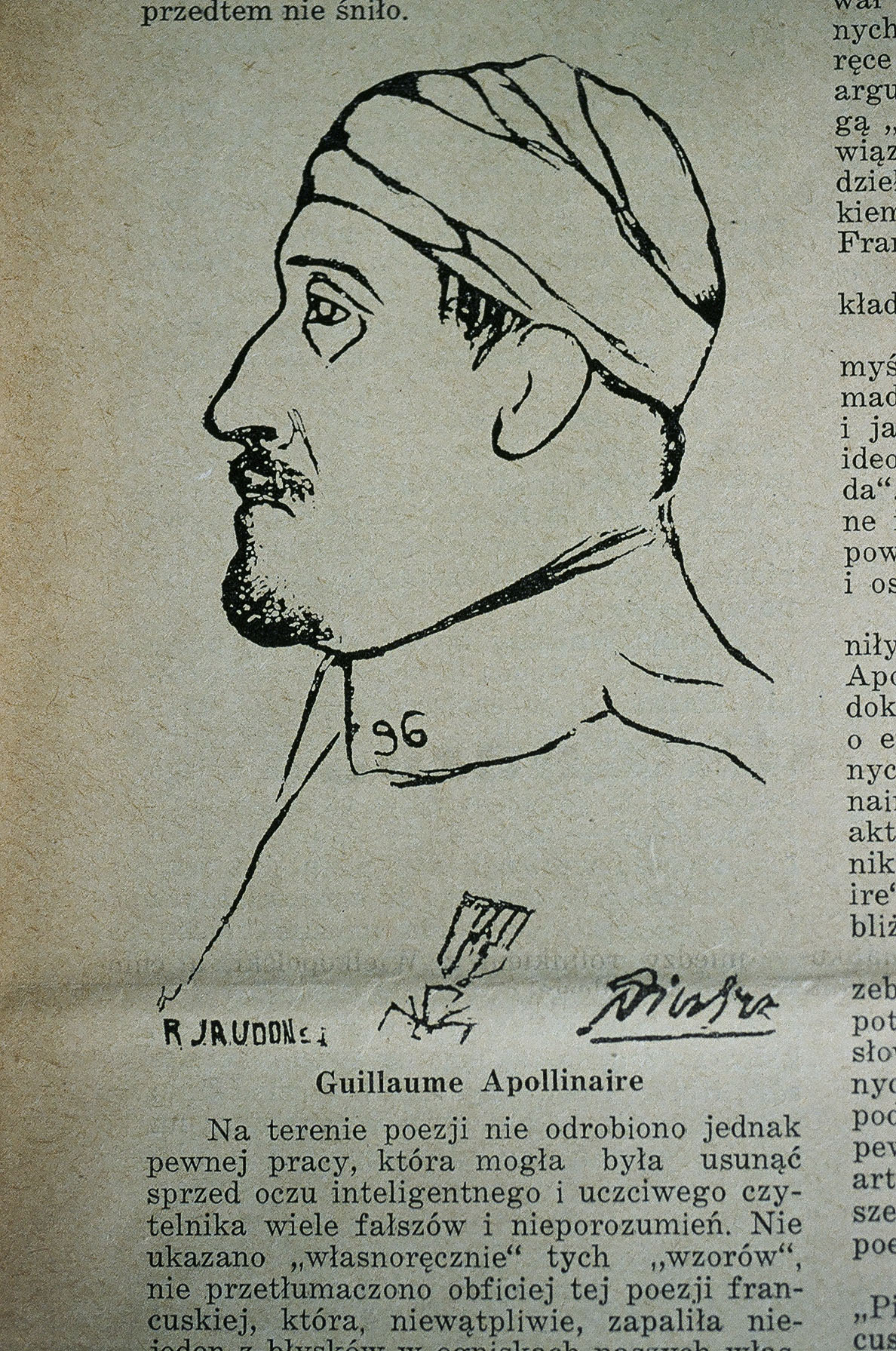
Drawing of Guillaume Apollinaire in Signals Magazine (1933–1939).

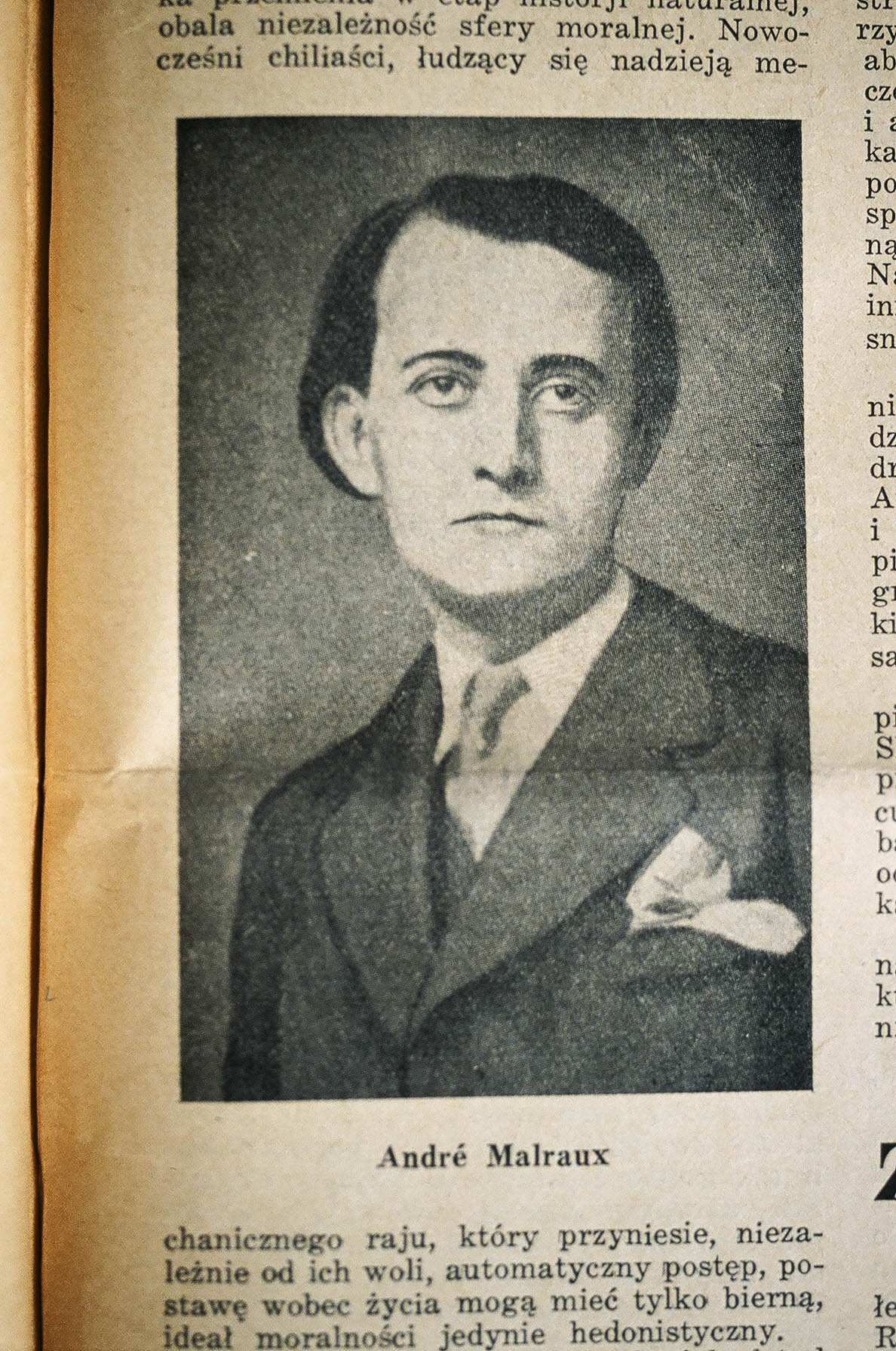
Photograph of André Malraux in Signals Magazine (1933–1939).

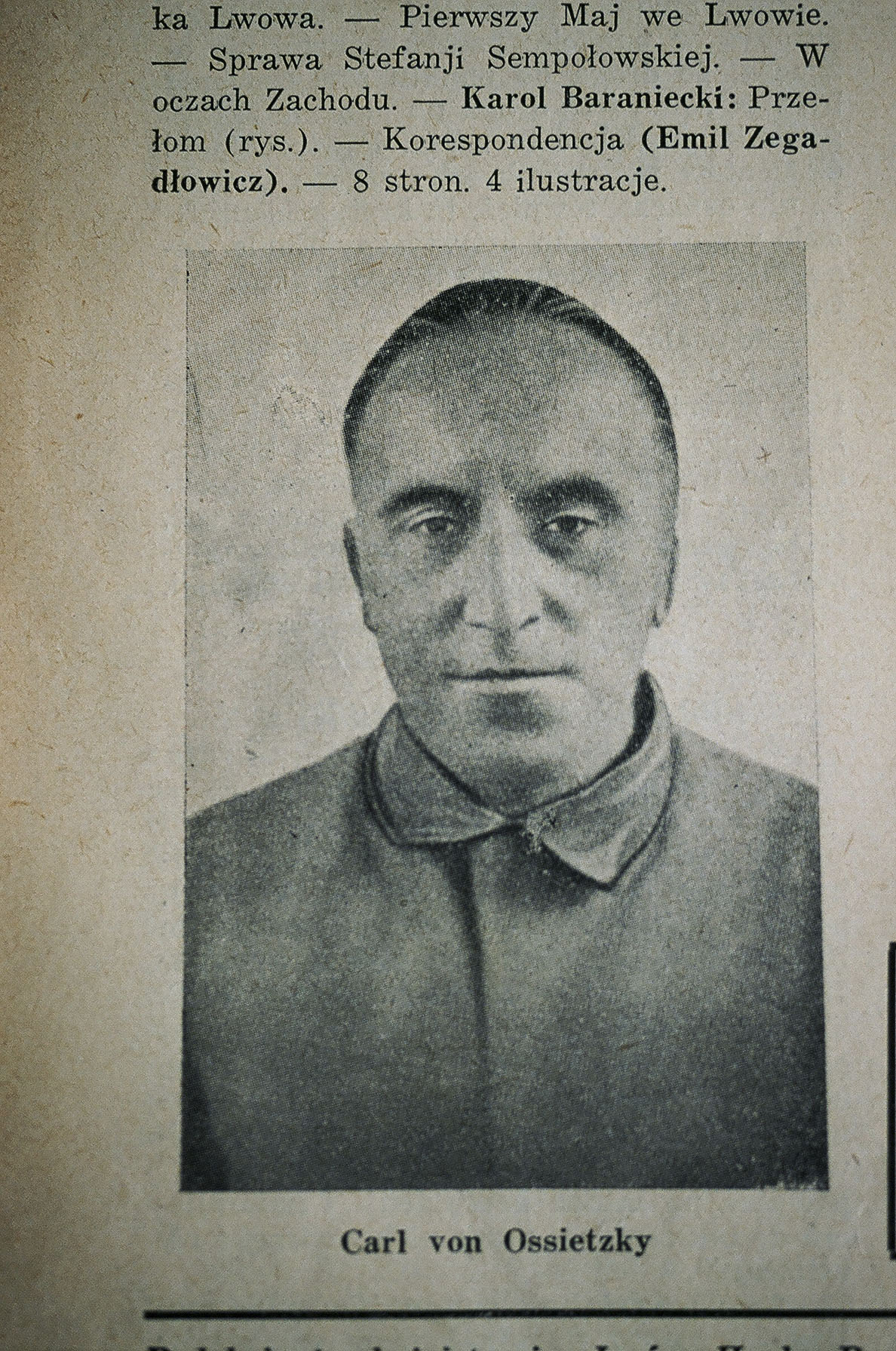
Photograph of the Nobel Peace Prize Laureate Carl von Ossietzky in Signals Magazine, 1936.

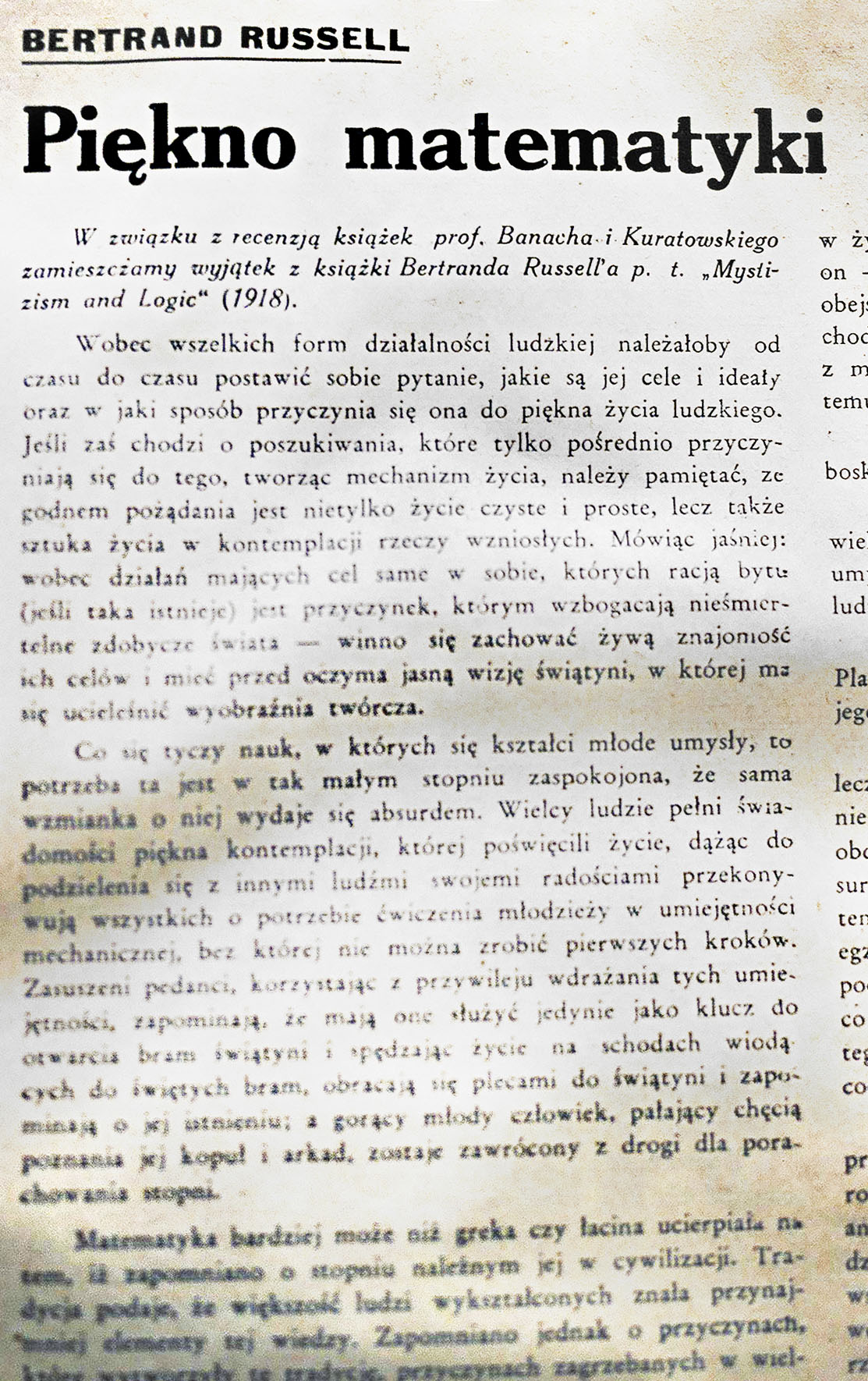
Bertrand Russell, The Beauty of Mathematics, in Signals Magazine (1933–1939).

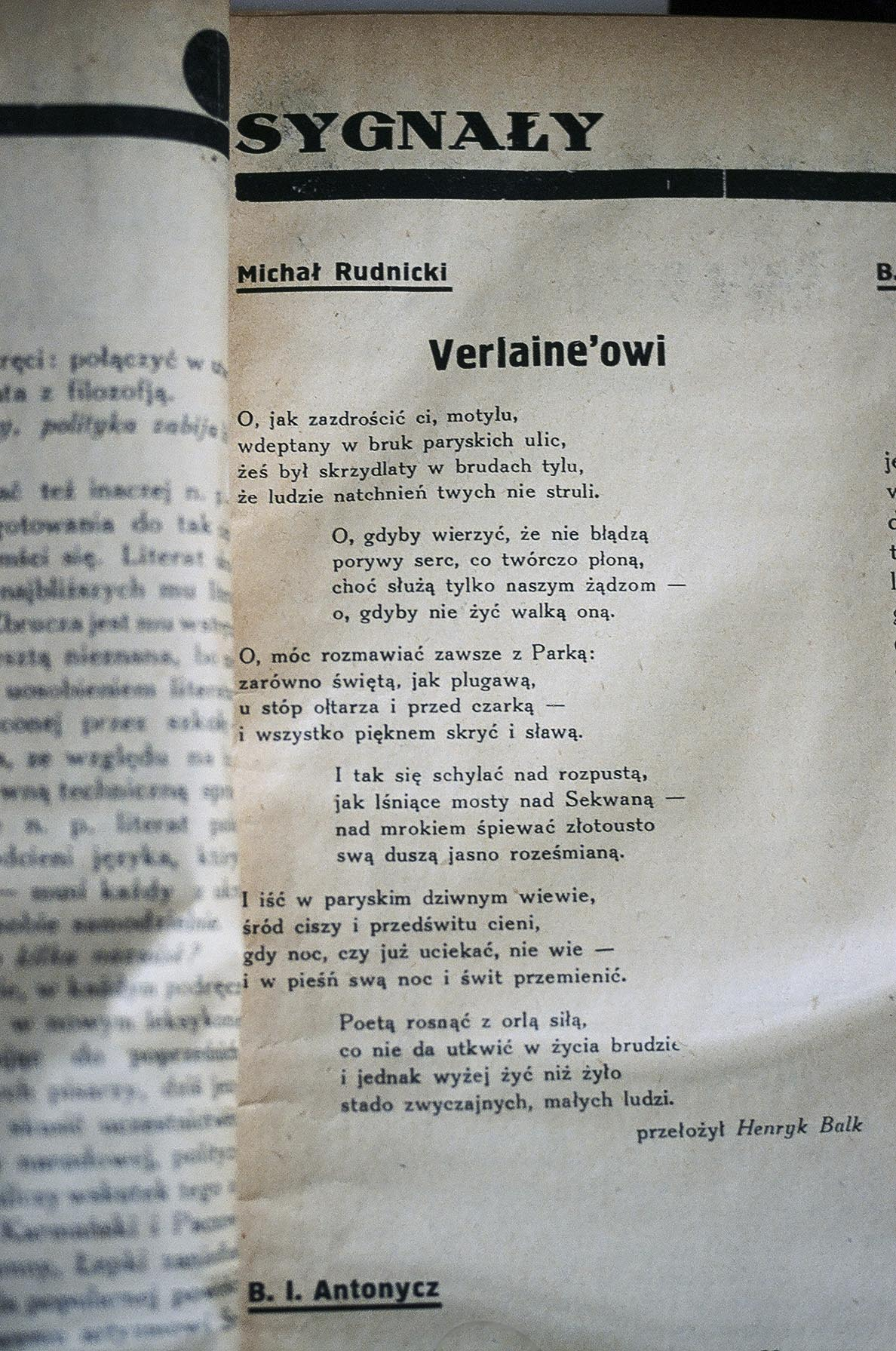
Poem “To Verlaine” by Ukrainian poet Mikhail Rudnickij, in the special Ukrainian issue of Signals Magazine, IV-V, 1934.

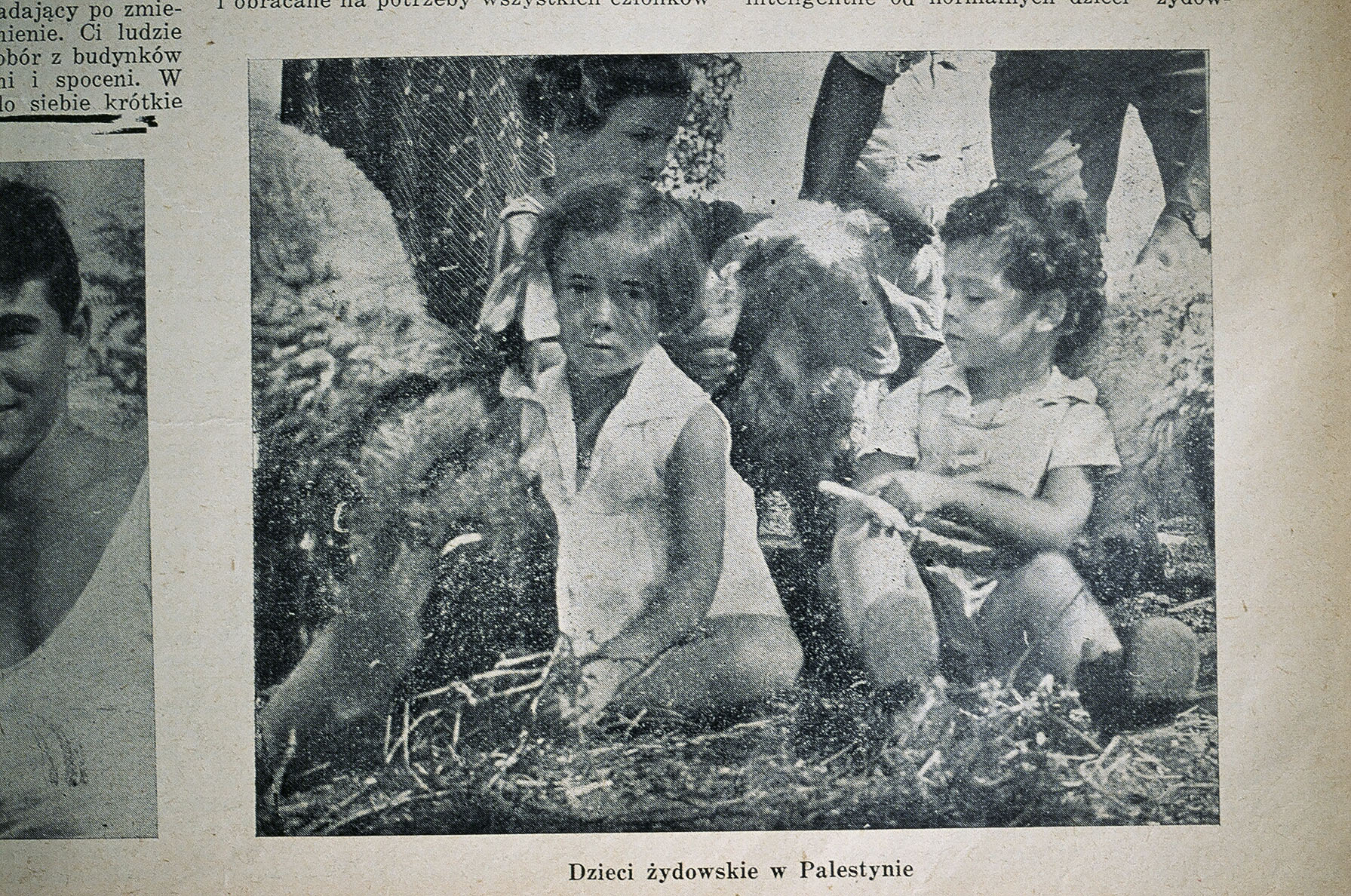
Photograph of Jewish children in Palestine, in Signals Magazine (1933–1939).

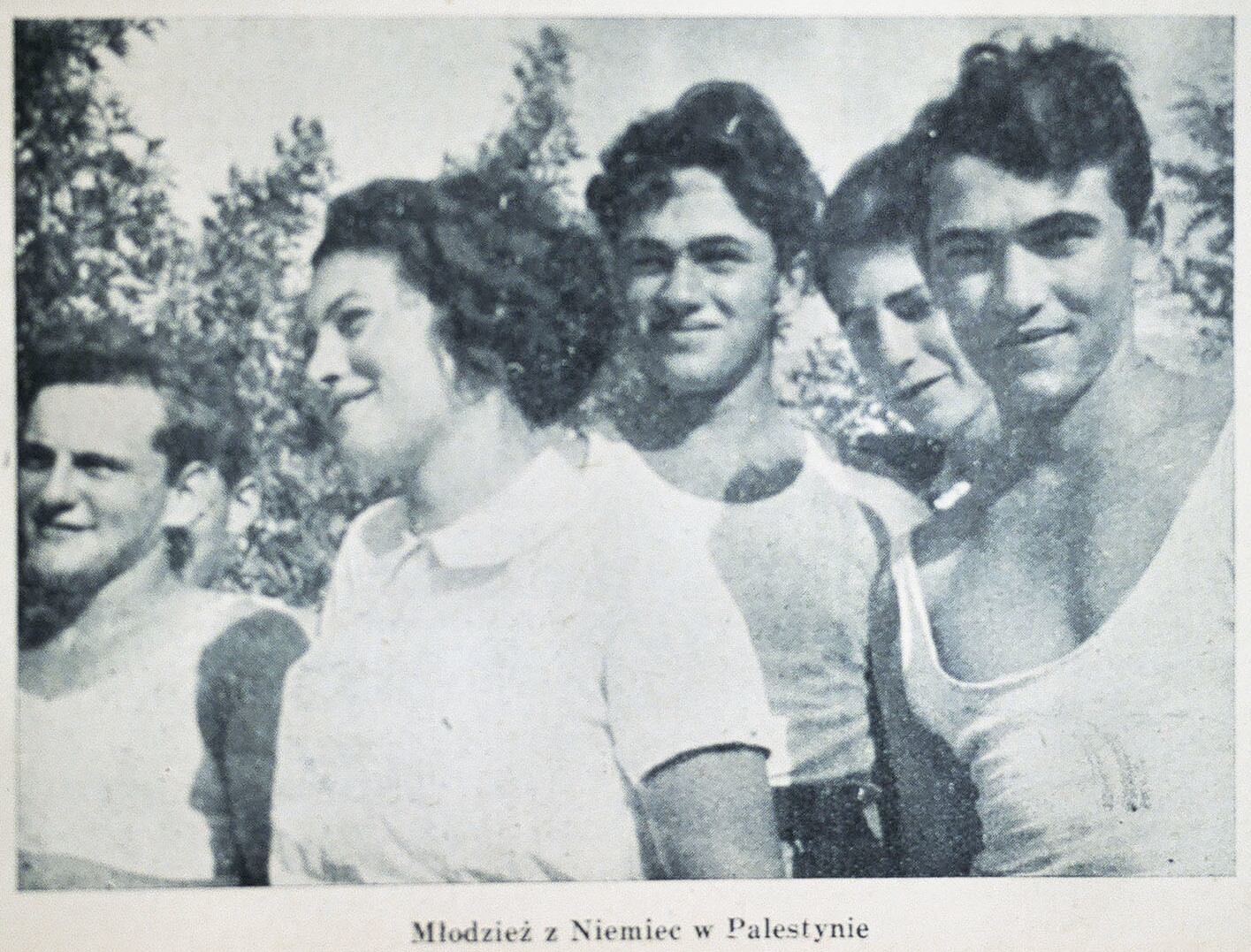
Photograph of youth from Germany in Palestine, in Signals Magazine (1933–1939).

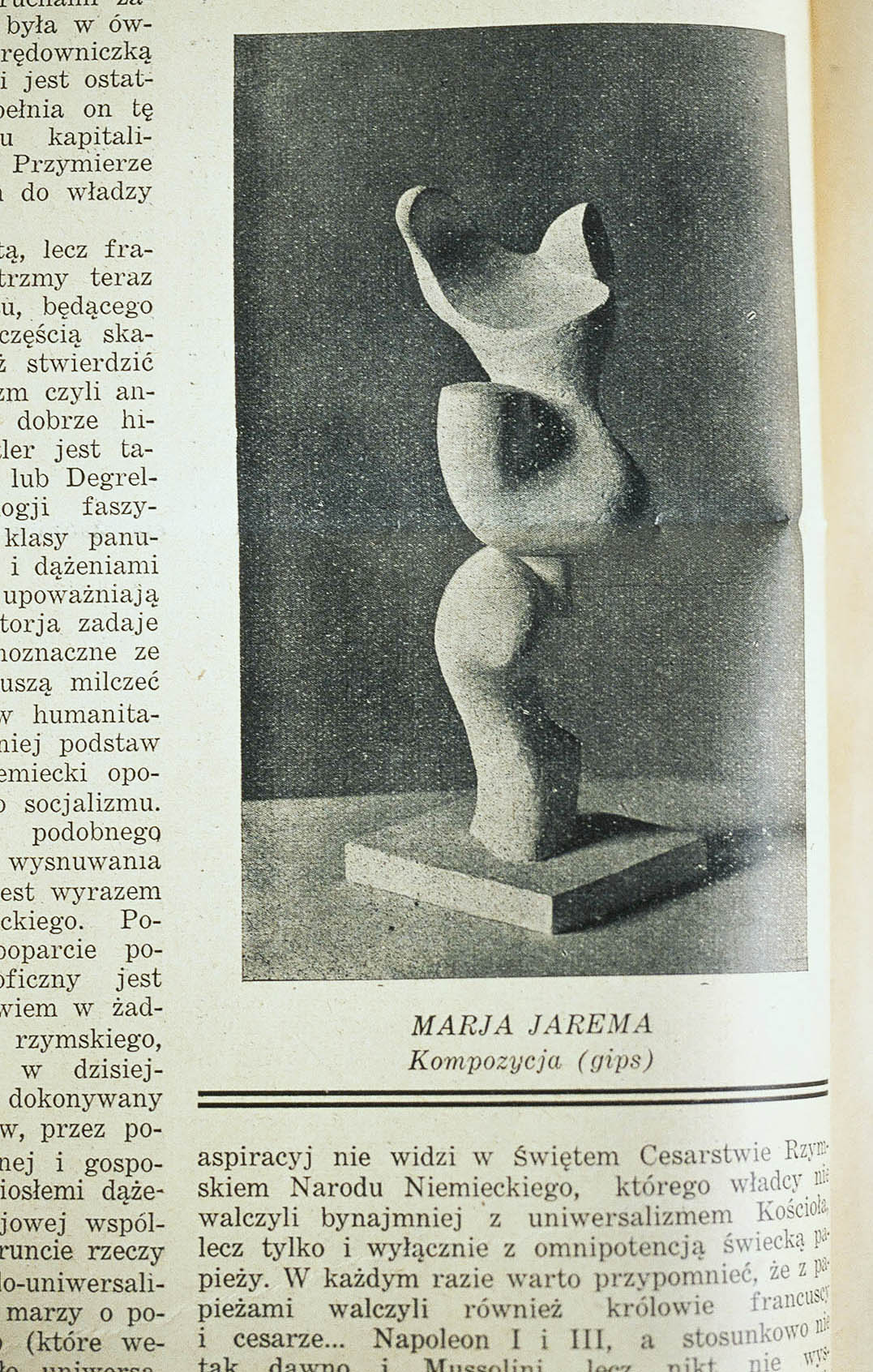
Maria Jarema, Composition (plaster), in Signals Magazine (1933–1939).

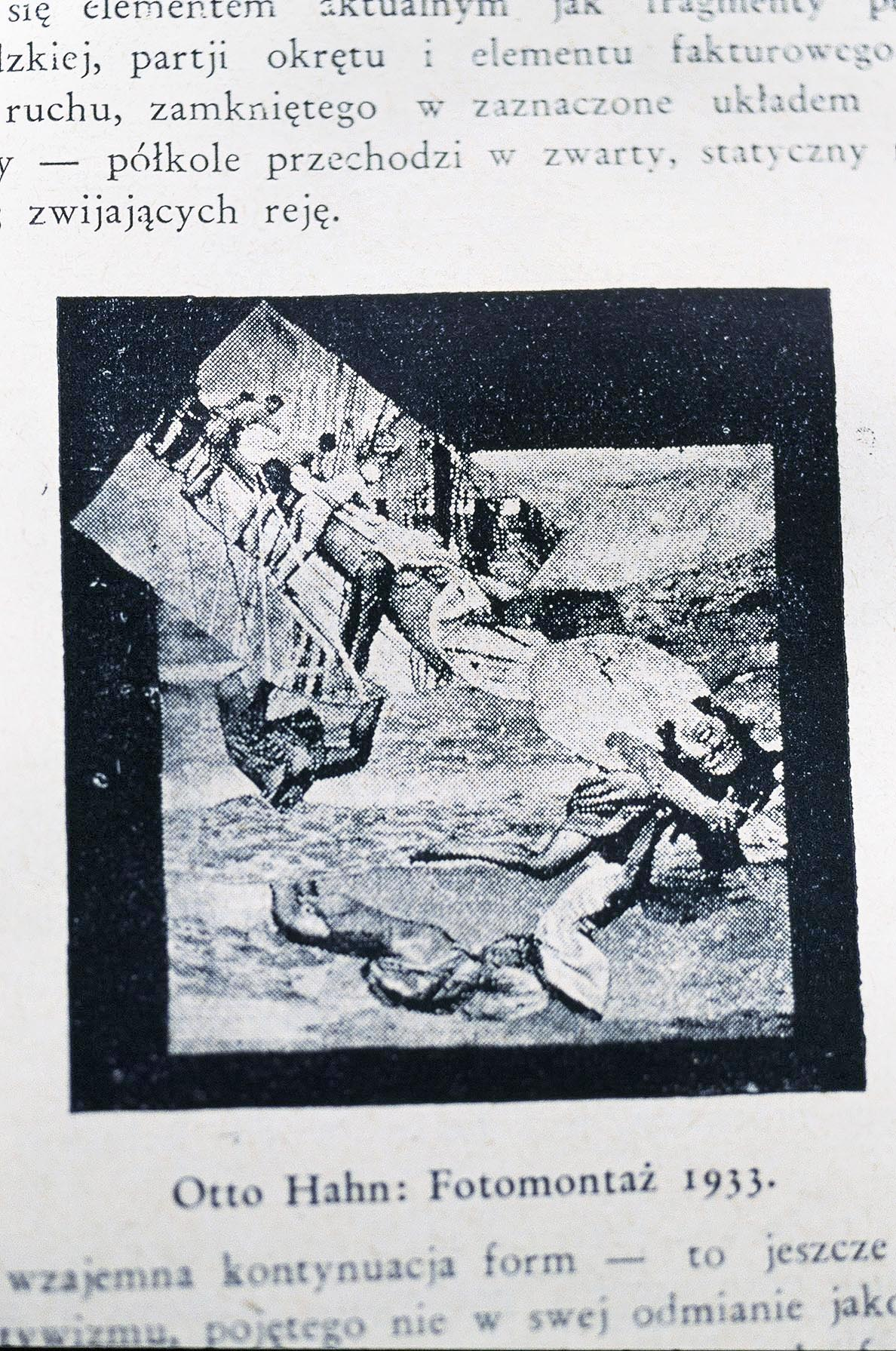
Otto Hahn, Photomontage (1933), illustrating the article “Genealogy of Photomontage” by Debora Vogel in Signals Magazine, XII, 1934.

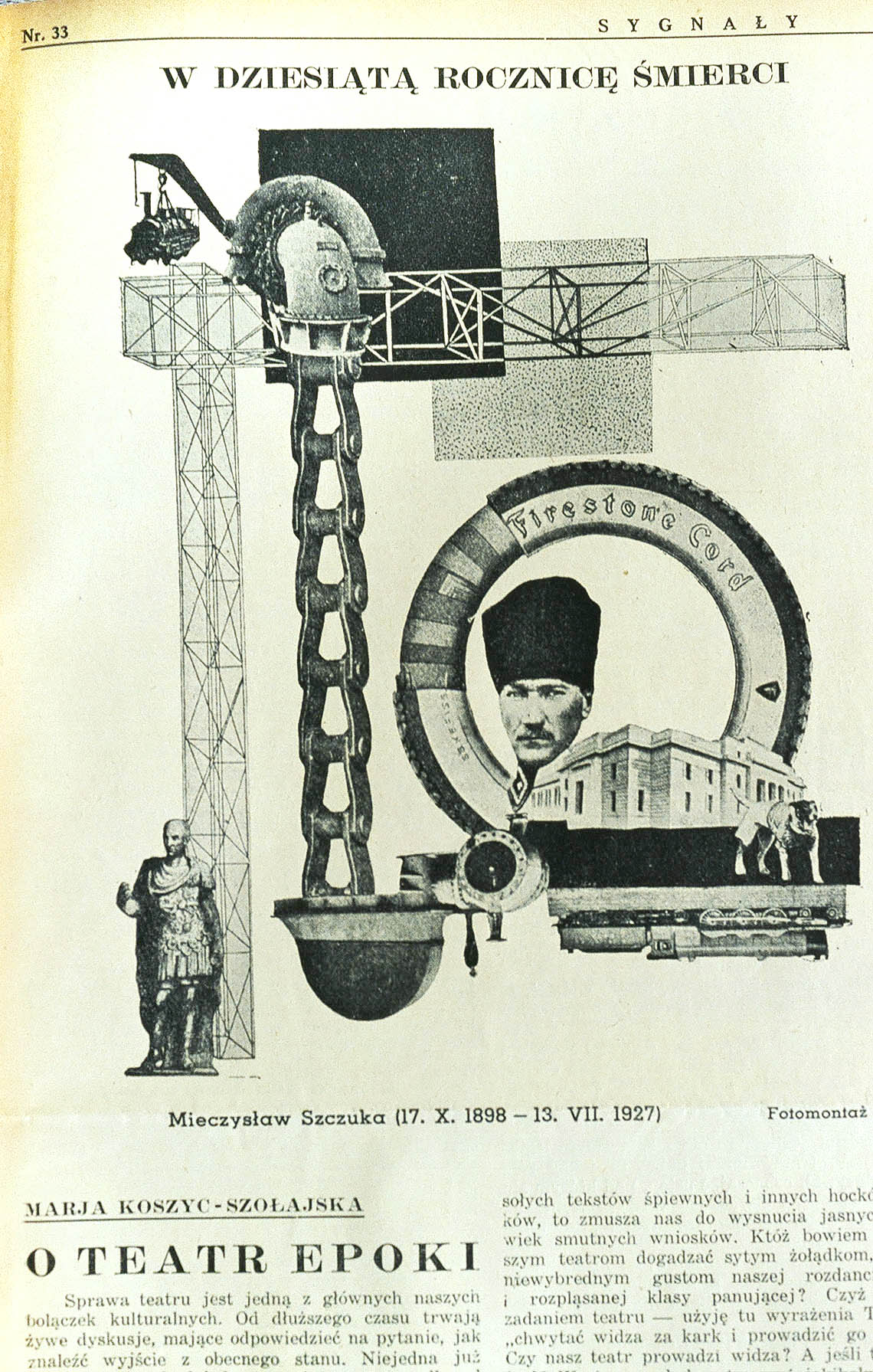
Mieczysław Szczuka, Photomontage, published on the 10th anniversary of his death in Signals Magazine, 1937.

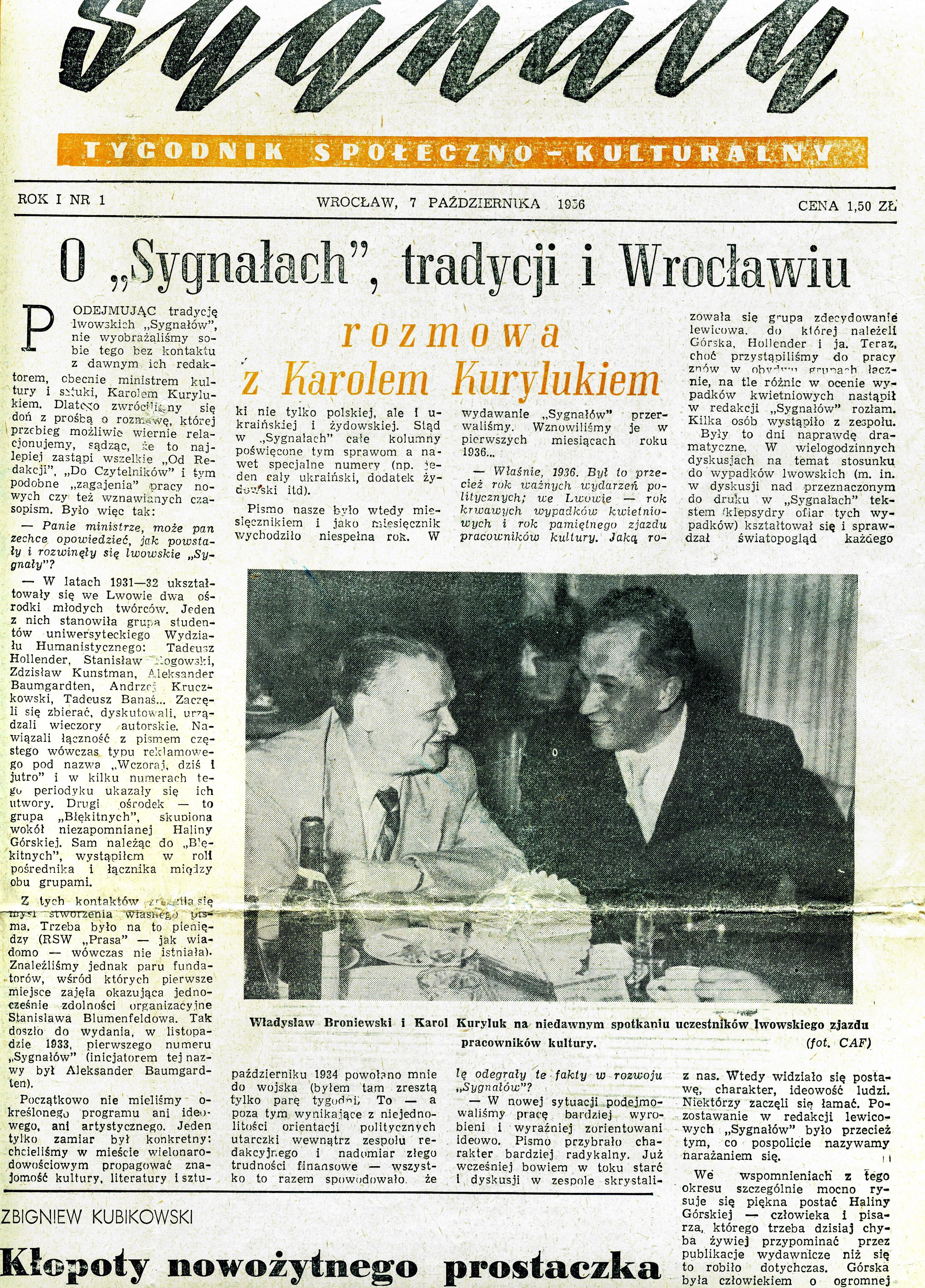
Władysław Broniewski and Karol Kuryluk, Signals Magazine II, 1956.

== Sources ==
- Encyklopedia Gazety Wyborczej, 2005
- Ewa Pankiewicz, Karol Kuryluk. Biografia polityczna 1910–1967, doctoral dissertation, Warsaw University.
- Prasa Polska w latach 1939–1945, Warsaw, 1980.
- Książka dla Karola (a collections of memoirs and essays on Karol Kuryluk, and his letters), ed. K. Koźniewski, Warsaw, 1984.
- Halina Górska, Chłopcy z ulic miasta, with an introduction by Karol Kuryluk, Warsaw, 1956.
- Letters and Drawings of Bruno Schulz, edited by J. Ficowski, New York, 1988.
- Ewa Kuryluk, Ludzie z powietrza—Air People, Cracow, 2002
- Ewa Kuryluk, Goldi, Warsaw, 2004
- Ewa Kuryluk, Cockroaches and Crocodiles, The Moment Magazine, July/August 2008
- Ewa Kuryluk, Frascati, Cracow, 2009 www.kuryluk.art.pl
- Source materials about Karol Kuryluk in Polish, published in Zeszytyhistoryczne, in Acrobat PDF format: http://www.marekhlasko.republika.pl/03_artykuly/Kuryluk.pdf
