= Polish encyclopedias =

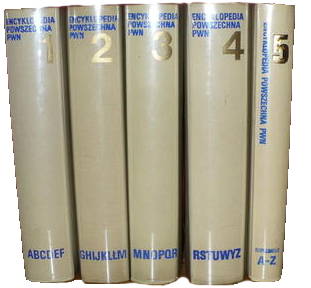
A 5-volume set of the 1970s Encyklopedia powszechna PWN

First Polish encyclopedias date to the 17th century.

Polish encyclopedias have been traditionally characterized by succinct definitions.

== See also ==
- List of encyclopedias in Polish
- Polish dictionaries
