= Wydawnictwa Szkolne i Pedagogiczne =

Polish educational publisher

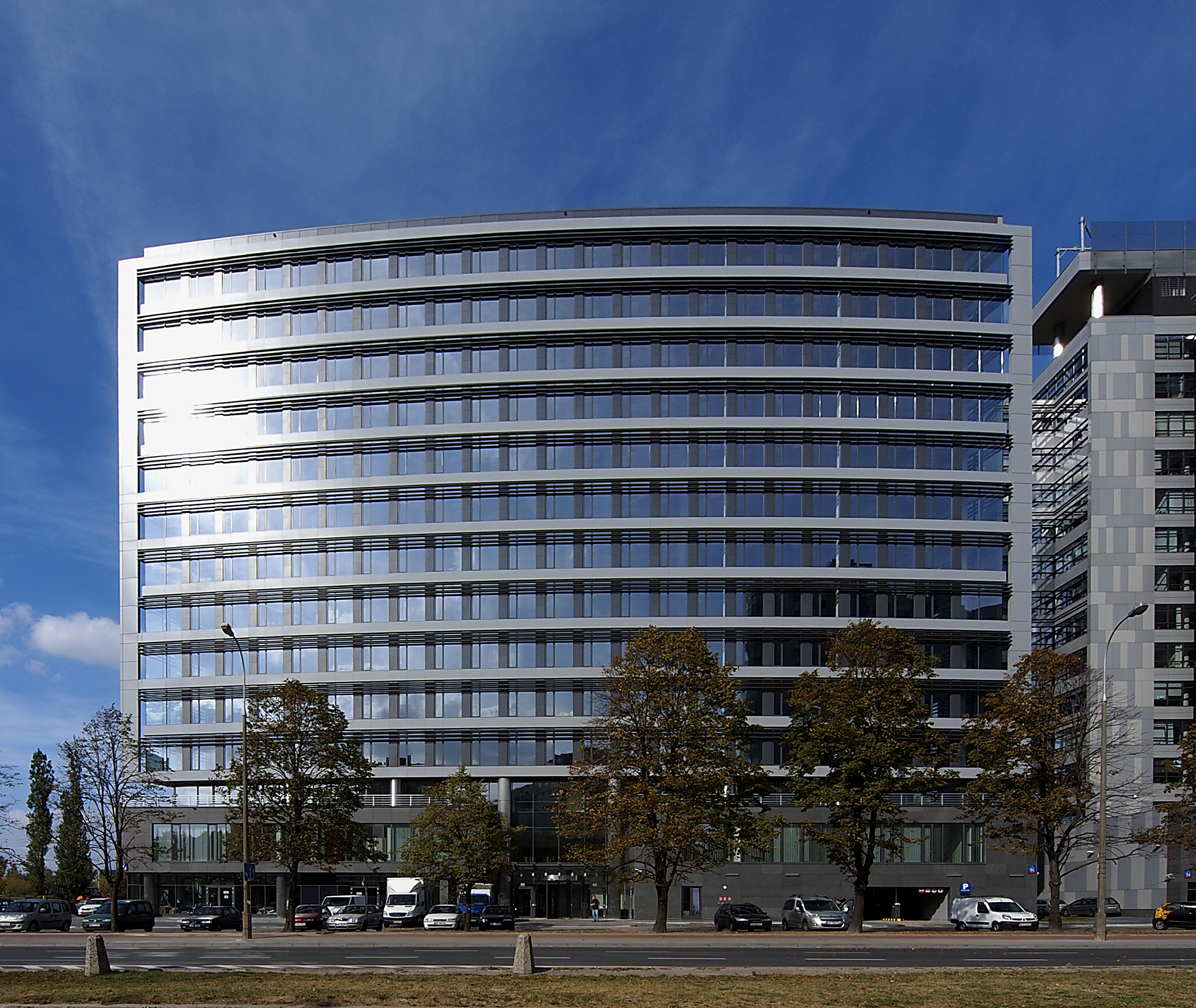
Offices of the WSiP

Wydawnictwa Szkolne i Pedagogiczne (WSiP; the company name has been variously translated as School and Pedagogical Publications, Scholastic and Pedagogical Publisher or Publishing House for School and Pedagogical Books) is a Polish educational book publisher founded in Warsaw, Poland, in 1945.

The company has been described as "known to all Polish students and educators". It had a monopoly on textbook publishing in Poland from 1950s to 1989. In 2004 it has been described as the biggest Polish textbook publisher, and in 2019, as one of Poland's two market leaders in the Polish school textbooks market, with the other main leader being the Nowa Era Publishing House.

== History ==
WSiP traces its history to 9 April 1945, when the Polish Ministry of Education established the National Organization of School Publications (Państwowe Zakłady Wydawnictw Szkolnych, PZWS). Its first director was Stanisław Pazyra. In 1951 a part of the PZWS was split off to eventually become the Polish Scientific Publishers PWN. During the communist era, it had the state monopoly on publishing school textbooks, and like all other publishers, its works were subject to censorship.

In 1998 the company began to be privatized, and in 2004 it debuted at the Warsaw Stock Exchange and it remained listed there until 2010 when it was converted into a Polish limited liability company (sp. z o.o.) and acquired by Advent International. In 2018 it was acquired from Advent International by the Central Group.

== Activities ==
The company is known for publishing textbooks for Polish educational institutions, from elementary schools to university level, as well as scholarly books in the fields such as psychology and pedagogy. The company has also published encyclopedias, scholarly journals and online media, including educational portals as well as mobile applications.
