= Adam Bromberg =

Polish publisher

Adam Bromberg (12 March 1912 at Lublin, then Russian Empire – 23 March 1993 at Stockholm, Sweden) was a Polish publisher.

== Biography ==
Bromberg was born into a wealthy Jewish family in Lublin in 1912. As a young man, Bromberg became a communist activist and was forced to leave Poland for Austria after he was caught distributing communist leaflets. He studied foreign trade in Vienna, and was a member of the Communist Party of Western Ukraine. In 1934, he was arrested and sentenced to 3.5 years of political prison. From 1939 to 1941, he worked as an editor in Lviv. He became a soldier of the Soviet Army in 1941, and a soldier of the Polish 1st Tadeusz Kościuszko Infantry Division in 1943. He was named deputy director of "Książka" Editors in 1946 and Director of the State Scientific Publishers in 1953. In 1968, he was arrested in the Polish political crisis because of his Jewish descent. In 1969, he emigrated to Sweden, where he edited translations of Polish literature.

In 1975, he founded the Swedish publishing company Brombergs förlag together with his daughter Dorotea Bromberg. The publishing house is a well known for its four Nobel prize winners (Isaac Bashevis Singer, Czeslaw Milosz, Octavio Paz and J M Coetzee) and for a number of international and Swedish authors, like Ian McEwan, Jonathan Franzen, Umberto Eco, Patti Smith, Oliver Sacks, Susan Sontag, Majgull Axelsson, Karin Alvtegen and Linda Olsson.
