= World Sports Encyclopedia =

The World Sports Encyclopedia is a reference book of articles covering sports and sporting games throughout the world.

== Origins ==
The book was spearheaded by Polish professor Wojciech Liponski with a team of co-authors, editors, and contributors worldwide. The encyclopedia was originally written in Polish and published as Encyklopedia sportów świata by Atena Publishing House in 2001.

== UNESCO support ==
Having received the support of UNESCO's Unit of Education, it was translated into English (World Sports Encyclopedia, 2003, Atena, MBI Books) and French (Encyclopedie des sports, 2005, Grund). The book features entries on more than 3,000 sports and sporting games from all over the world, including Olympic and international sports, traditional and indigenous sports and games, historical and extinct sports, regional sports, extreme sports, martial arts, school and children's sports and games. The book presents action photos, as well as works of sport art, prints, posters and original illustrations.
