= Tadeusz Hollender =

Polish poet, translator and humorist

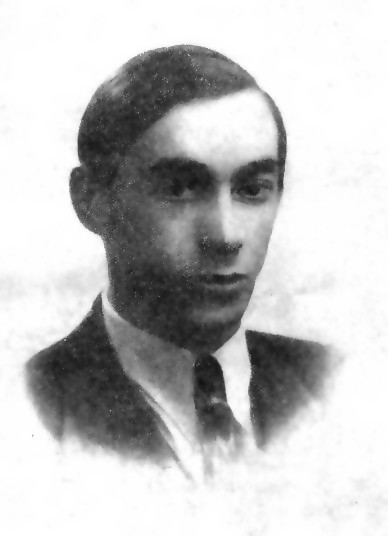
- Born: 30 May 1910; Leżajsk
- Died: 31 May 1943 (aged 33); Warsaw
- Writing career
- Genres: poetry, satire, translation

Tadeusz Hollender (30 May 1910 – 31 May 1943) was a Polish poet, translator and humorist. During World War II, he wrote satirical articles and poems in underground press, for that he was arrested by the German Gestapo and executed in May in the infamous prison, Pawiak.

In 1929-1933 he studied law and Polish philology at the Jan Kazimierz University in Lviv (studies did not finish). In 1929 he made his debut as a poet. Since 1933 he worked in the editorial staff of "Yesterday – Today – Tomorrow". Co-founder, and later editor of "Signals"; he also wrote to "Pins". In 1937, he moved to Warsaw. In 1938 he traveled in Palestine, Greece, Turkey and Romania, sending reports to national magazines. In 1939, again in Lviv, where he became famous for his refusal to sign the servile declaration of Polish writers, welcoming the "reunification" of Ukraine. In 1941, after the occupation of Lviv by the Germans, he returned to Warsaw. He participated in the underground literary life, published his poems in the pages of the printed press and secret poetry anthology, the secret was selling magazines, organizing artistic events. He took part in Operation N, worked with a paper literary Bureau of Information and Propaganda of the Headquarters of the Home Army.

A school in Brzóza Królewska and a street in Kraków, bear his name.
