= WIEM Encyklopedia =

Polish online encyclopedia

WIEM Encyklopedia (full name in Polish: Wielka Interaktywna Encyklopedia Multimedialna - "Great Interactive Multimedia Encyclopedia"; in Polish, wiem also means 'I know') was a Polish Internet encyclopedia, active from 1998 to c. 2017.

The encyclopedia was based on the first printed edition was released in mid-1990s (with Volume I of Popularna Encyklopedia Powszechna - Popular General Encyclopedia - released in 1994; 20 volumes and a supplement were released in total) with the second in 1998 (under the name Multimedialna Encyklopedia Powszechna - Multimedia Popular Encyclopedia). It contained about 66,000 entries and various multimedia add-ons.

The 1998 edition was also released online (www.encyklopedia.pl) under the name Wielka Interaktywna Encyklopedia Multimedialna and in 2000 was acquired by the Polish web portal Onet.pl. Around that time it was the largest Polish language online encyclopedia. From 2004 to 2 March 2006 it was not free, however before and after it was free to access. As of the 9th online edition in 2006, it contains 125,000 entries. The number of articles has been reported as similar in 2013.

It received several awards in the late 1990s.
