= Polish Scientific Publishers PWN =

Polish publisher

Polish Scientific Publishers
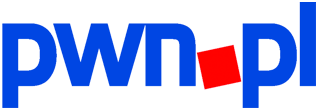

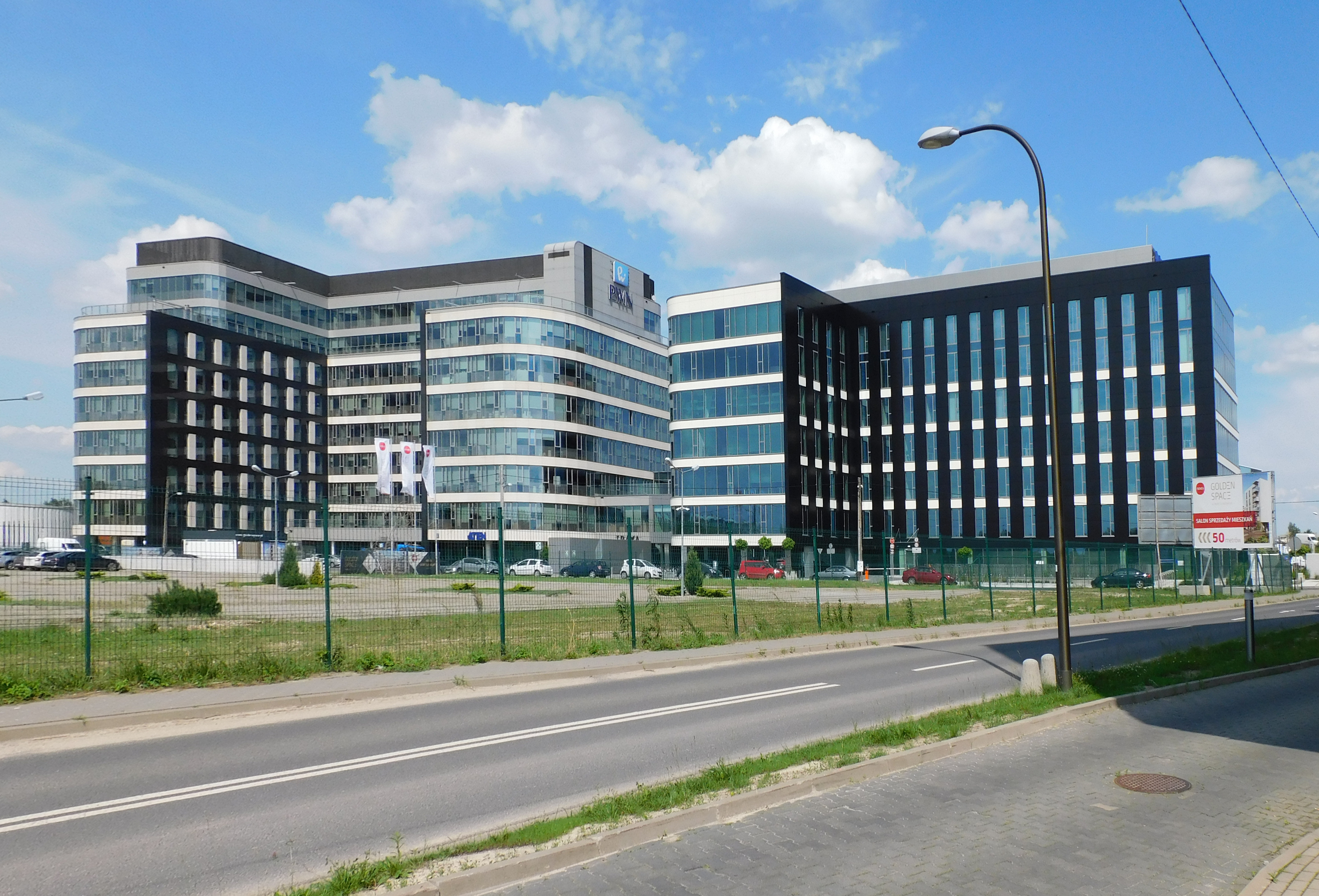
- Native name: Wydawnictwo Naukowe PWN
- Industry: Publishing
- Founded: 1951; 74 years ago
- Headquarters: Warsaw, Gottlieba Daimlera 2, Poland
- Website: pwn.pl/en/ English; pwn.pl Polish

Wydawnictwo Naukowe PWN (Polish Scientific Publishers PWN; until 1991 Państwowe Wydawnictwo Naukowe - National Scientific Publishers PWN, PWN) is a Polish book publisher, founded in 1951, when it split from the Wydawnictwa Szkolne i Pedagogiczne.

Adam Bromberg, who was the enterprise's director between 1953 and 1965, made it into communist Poland's largest publishing house. The printing house is best known as a publisher of encyclopedias, dictionaries and university handbooks. It is the leading Polish provider of scientific, educational and professional literature as well as works of reference. It authored the Wielka Encyklopedia Powszechna PWN, by then the largest Polish encyclopedia, as well as its successor, the Wielka Encyklopedia PWN, which was published between 2001 and 2005. There is also an online PWN encyclopedia – Internetowa encyklopedia PWN.

Initially state-owned, since 1991 it has been a private company. The company is a member of International Association of Scientific, Technical, and Medical Publishers (STM).

On April 1, 2022, Wydawnictwo Naukowe PWN SA acquired the companies Wydawnictwo Szkolne PWN and PZWL Wydawnictwo Lekarskie.
