= Wielka Encyklopedia PWN =

Polish universal encyclopedia

Wielka Encyklopedia PWN (Great PWN Encyclopedia) is a universal encyclopedia in Polish, published by Wydawnictwo Naukowe PWN (until 1991 Państwowe Wydawnictwo Naukowe — State Scientific Publishers, PWN) in Warsaw, between 2001 and 2005.

It is a replacement for the socialist-era Wielka Encyklopedia Powszechna PWN (Great Universal Encyclopedia), which was considered outdated and criticised for reflecting the official ideology of the period when it was produced. Wielka Encyklopedia PWN surpasses its predecessor in size, with 140,000 entries in 30 volumes plus a supplement, and is now the largest Polish "traditional" encyclopedia ever issued.

The Polish Wikipedia exceeded the Wielka Encyklopedia PWN's number of articles on 22 October 2005.
