= Andrzej Strug =

Polish socialist and activist (1871–1937)

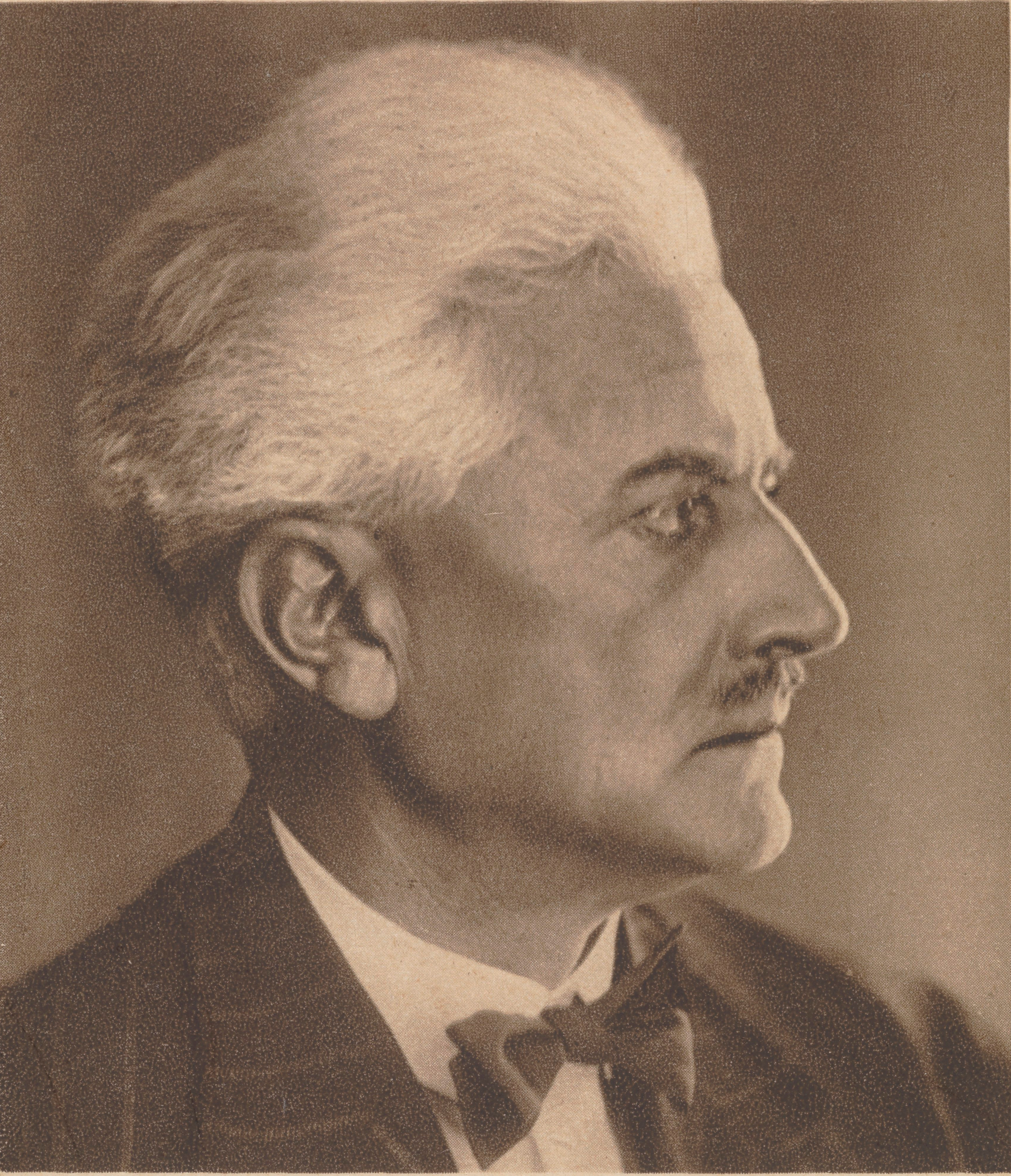
- Andrzej Strug, ca. 1933
- Born: Tadeusz Gałecki; 28 November 1871; Lublin, Congress Poland
- Died: 9 December 1937 (aged 66); Warsaw, Poland
- Writing career
- Notable works: Chimera; Żółty Krzyż

Andrzej Strug, real name Tadeusz (or Stefan) Gałecki (sources vary; 28 November 1871/1873 – 9 December 1937) was a Polish socialist politician, publicist and activist for Poland's independence. He was also a freemason and declined the offer to join the prestigious Polish Academy of Literature, upset by official criticism of the movement.

== Career ==
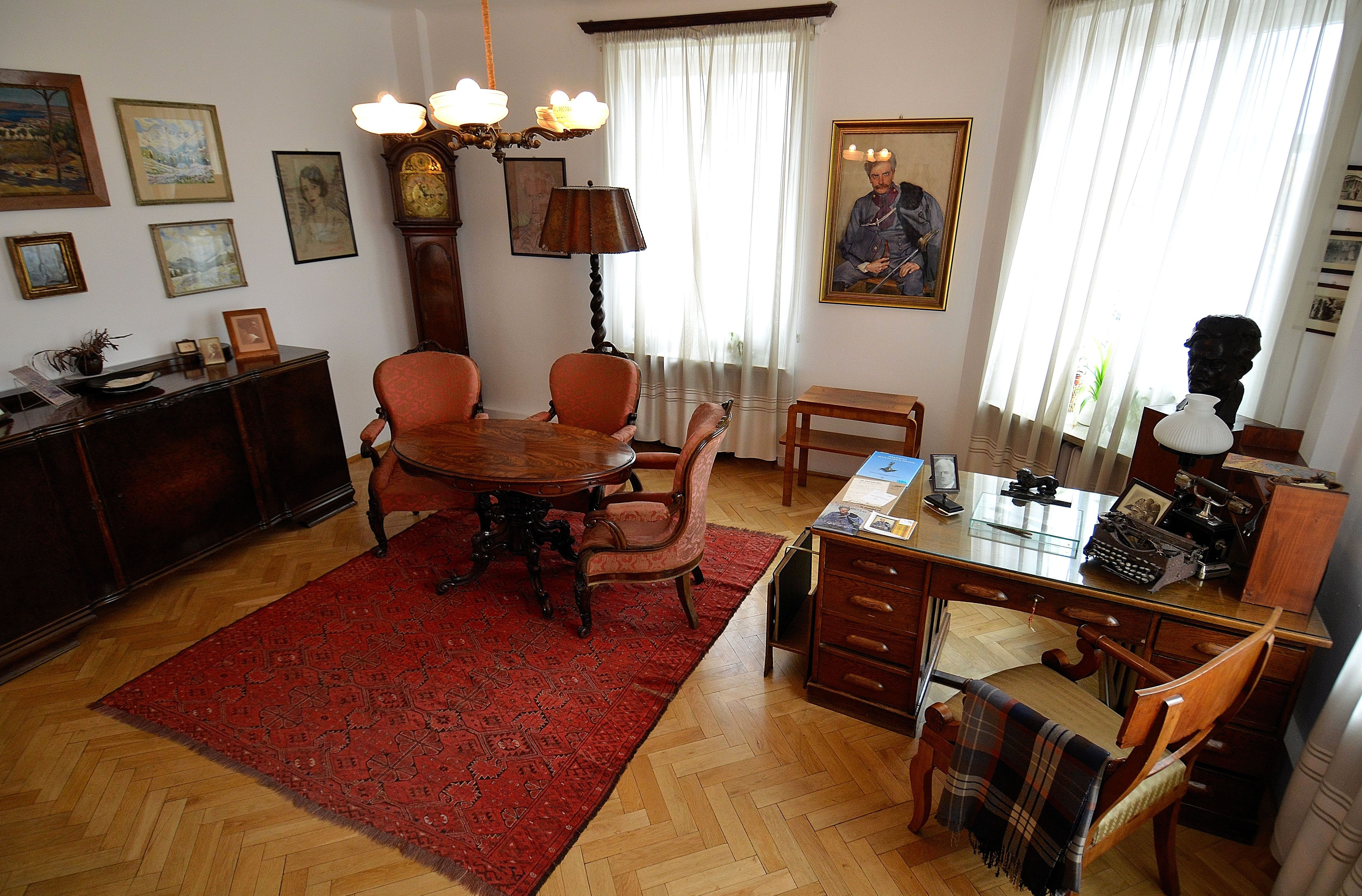
Andrzej Strug Museum in Warsaw

Strug was active in several Polish organizations under military Partitions, and was a member of the Polish Socialist Party. In 1895 he was imprisoned by Tsarist authorities in the Warsaw Citadel, and in 1897 forcibly deported to Arkhangelsk Governorate. After another arrest in 1907, he was forced to leave the Russian Empire, exiled from the occupied Polish lands. He settled in Paris.

During World War I, Strug fought in the First Brigade of the Polish Legions of Józef Piłsudski. After Poland regained its independence in 1918, Strug remained active in political and social life. In 1923 he was involved in the foundation of the Airborne and Antigas Defence League.

He also served as the Sovereign Commander of the Supreme Council, and the Grand Master, of the National Grand Lodge of Poland.

In his works, he focused on the themes of war, and Polish Legions, as well as the ideas of social justice.

== Works ==
- Ludzie podziemni (1908)
- Jutro (1908)
- Dzieje jednego pocisku (1910)
- Ojcowie nasi (1911)
- Portret (1912)
- Zakopanoptikon (1913-1914)
- Pieniądz (1914)
- Chimera (1918)
- Wyspa zapomnienia (1920)

- Odznaka za wierną służbę (1921)
- Mogiła nieznanego żołnierza (1922)
- Pokolenie Marka Świdy (1925)
- Fortuna kasjera Śpiewankiewicza (1928)
- Pisma (1930-1931)
- Żółty Krzyż (1932-1933)
- Miliardy (1937)
- W Nienadybach byczo jest (1937)
