= Internetowa encyklopedia PWN =

Free online Polish-language encyclopedia

Internetowa encyklopedia PWN (Polish for Internet PWN Encyclopedia) was a free online Polish-language encyclopedia published by Wydawnictwo Naukowe PWN. It contained some 80,000 entries and 5,000 illustrations. It was shut down c. 2026.
