= Wielka Encyklopedia Powszechna PWN =

Polish encyclopedia

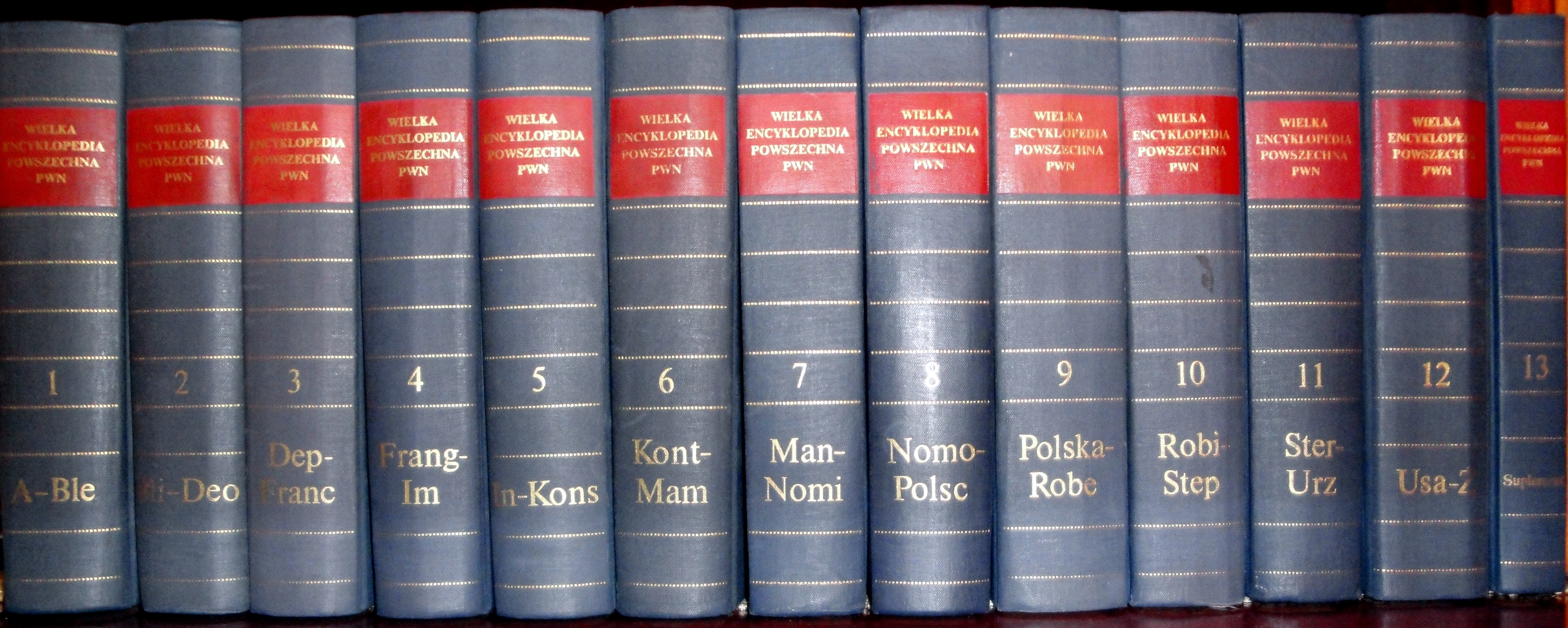
Volumes 1 through 11

The Wielka Encyklopedia Powszechna PWN (Great Universal Encyclopedia PWN) was, until 2005, the largest Polish encyclopedia ever written. It was published between 1962 and 1970 by Państwowe Wydawnictwo Naukowe (State Scientific Publishers, PWN) in Warsaw. The WEP contains about 82,000 entries, 12,000 illustrations, 200 color and 650 black-and-white inserted illustrations, and 120 color maps in thirteen volumes (including the Supplement). Many entries are signed, and many contain bibliographic material. The encyclopedia shows severe censorship. As is stated in the foreword, the encyclopedia is "based on rationalist and materialist assumptions" and reflects the worldview of the "socialist ideology".

About 2000 authors, 1000 reviewers, and almost 100 editors were supervised by the Scientific Board appointed by the Polish Academy of Sciences (PAN) and the Ministry of Higher Education, and headed by Professor Tadeusz Kotarbiński. The initiative to write the WEP was taken by PWN in July 1957 when it was decided that an 8-volume (later expanded to 12 volumes) universal encyclopedia would be published. Preparations began in 1957 and the actual writing started in April 1959. It took 14 months to prepare the list of entries, about 16 months to write the first volume, and then about 9 months for each next volume. Right after the twelfth volume had been published, the work on the Supplement (about five thousand updated, revised or completely new articles) began.

== Volumes ==
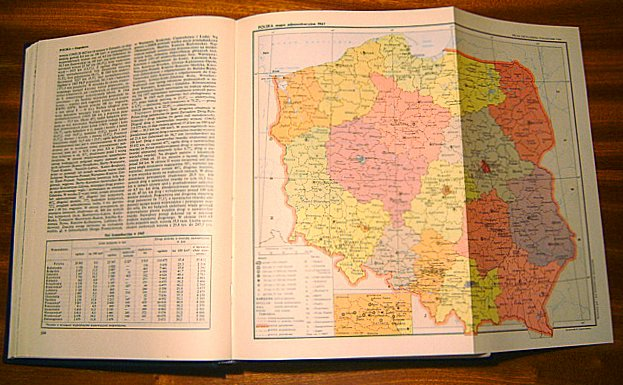
An open volume of the encyclopedia

with dates of publishing:

1. A – Ble, 1962
2. Bli – Deo, 1963
3. Dep – Franc, 1964
4. Frang – Im, 1964
5. In – Kons, 1965
6. Kont – Mam, 1965
7. Man – Nomi, 1966
8. Nomo – Polsc, 1966
9. Polska – Robe, 1967; begins with an extensive 224-page long article about Poland, subdivided into 35 sections.
10. Robi – Step, 1967
11. Ster – Urz, 1968
12. Usa – Ż, 1969
13. Supplement, 1970

== Controversy ==
Volume 8 includes an article entitled "Hitlerite concentration camps" (Obozy koncentracyjne hitlerowskie) which caused much controversy. The major objections were that:

- it did not show that concentration camps were not the only tool of extermination used by the Nazis (along with penal camps, prisons, ghettos, labor camps, POW camps, etc.);
- it did not show the difference in the role of concentration camps prior to and after the German invasion on Poland;
- it distorted the image of the martyrdom of the Polish and other nations;
- it ignored the existence of German death camps localized outside Poland, i.e. in Germany, Austria, the Soviet Union, Yugoslavia and other German-occupied countries.

As the result, the editorial team was "renewed" and a new, revised article, this time entitled "Hitlerite camps" (Obozy hitlerowskie), was added as an inset to Volume 11, and later included in the Supplement.

== See also ==
- Wielka Encyklopedia PWN (the successor)
