= Kuryluk =

Kuryluk is the Polish language spelling of the Ukrainian-language surname Курилюк (Kuriliuk/Kurilyuk/Kuryliuk/Kurylyuk).

The surname may refer to:

- Ewa Kuryluk (born 1946), Polish artist
- Jadwiga Kuryluk (1912–1995), Polish actress
- Karol Kuryluk (1910–1967), Polish journalist, editor, activist, politician and diplomat
- Maria Kuryluk (1917–2001), Polish poet, writer, translator, and amateur pianist
- Merve Kuryluk (born 1937), Canadian hockey player
