= Ewa Kuryluk =

Polish artist

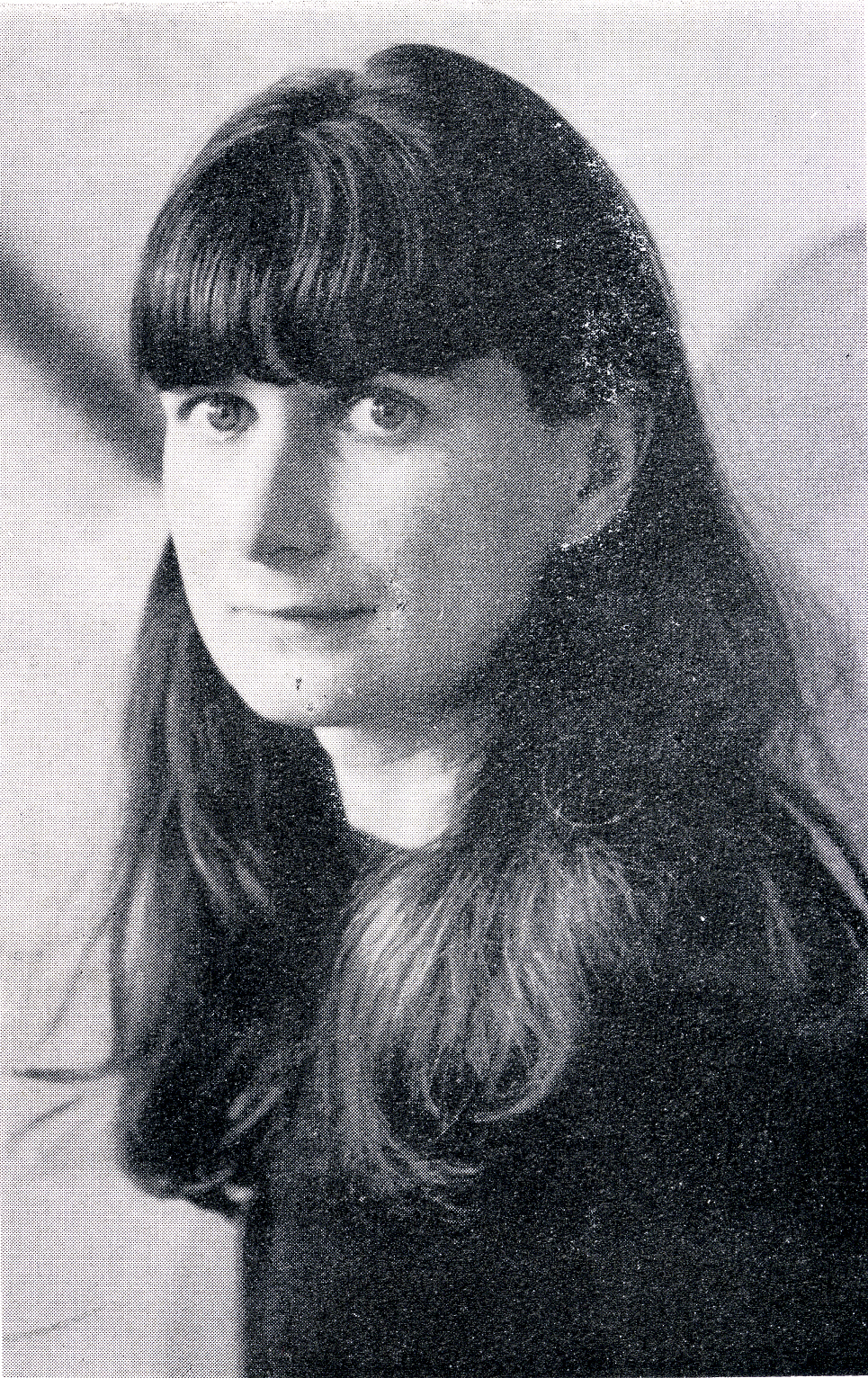
Ewa Kuryluk, c. 1976, from the "Cream" Catalogue, published in Warsaw, 1977

Ewa Kuryluk (born 5 May 1946) is a Polish artist. She is a pioneer of textile installation, painter, photographer, art historian, novelist and poet, and the author of numerous books, written in Polish and English, many of which have been translated into other languages. She has had over fifty solo exhibitions, participated in many group shows and created outdoor installations throughout the world. Her work can be seen in the National Museums in Warsaw, Kraków, Wrocław and Poznań, as well as in public and private collections in Europe, USA, Latin America and Japan. She obtained a diploma in painting and an M.A. in Art History from the Warsaw Academy of Fine Arts in 1970. In 1978, she shifted her focus from painting on canvas to textile installation.

== Biography ==
Ewa Kuryluk was born in Kraków, Poland, the first child of Karol Kuryluk, editor of the "Odrodzenie" magazine, and Maria Kuryluk (born Miriam Kohany), writer and amateur pianist. In 1947 the family moved to Warsaw and in 1950 Ewa's brother Piotr was born. In 1959, her father was appointed ambassador to Austria and they moved to Vienna. In 1964, the artist finished Austrian secondary school and commenced her studies at Warsaw Academy of Fine Arts, obtaining her Diploma in painting and M.A. in Art History in 1970. On 9 December 1967 her father died suddenly of a heart attack, and in March 1968 the family was further unsettled by the outbreak of anti-Semitism and the emigration of friends, with her brother showing the first signs of mental illness.

Kuryluk's distinct style of painting and her rebellious nature brought her in conflict with her professors. In 1967 she was granted permission to organize an independent show of student work, including her own, in the staircase of the painting department. The unusual event drew crowds and was reported in the press. However the authorities did not like the stir and she was forbidden to continue. Kuryluk began to export her work clandestinely and to exhibit abroad. Her first solo show at the Woodstock Gallery in London coincided with her final exams in Warsaw, and she kept it secret. In 1976, the Year of the Political Prisoner, she donated work to Amnesty International. In the late 1970s she and her friends, the painters Andrzej Bieńkowski, Andrzej Bielawski and Łukasz Korolkiewicz formed a group with the ironic name "Cream". Taking advantage of some liberalization under Edward Gierek, she organized an independent international art exhibition, "The Garden of Knowledge" in June 1981, hoping to turn it into a biennial event.

The opening of her first solo show in the United States on 12 December 1981 coincided with the imposition of martial law in Poland. In February 1982, with the aid of a small European Program Exchange grant sponsored by George Soros, she came to the Institute for the Humanities at New York University. Founded by Richard Sennett, the Institute counted Susan Sontag, the Russian poet Joseph Brodsky, and the novelist Edmund White among its members. Appointed a Fellow, she conducted a seminar on shadows, mirrors and doubles in art and literature in 1982 and 1983. She also switched to writing in English and recounted her ludicrous fights with Polish censorship in "Who's afraid of the little red mouse?" published in The Village Voice. In March 1984 her first New York solo installation opened at Art in General and she kept exhibiting with the non-for-profit gallery until 1989. She taught at New School for Social Research, New York University and University of California, San Diego. In 1985 she was honored for her activity on behalf of free speech and human rights by the New York Fund for Free Expression. In July 1989, after a compromise had been reached between the Polish regime and Solidarity, she visited with her family in Warsaw, renewed contact with her fellow artists and soon resumed her professional activities. 1992 she founded the association Amici di Tworki to support patients at the huge mental hospital near Warsaw. In 2012 she was awarded the Gloria Artis for merit to Polish culture.

== Works on Paper ==
Ewa Kuryluk worked on paper from her school days and later pursued in painting and installation themes she had developed then. Her early work is defined by a diversity of techniques, disciplines and subjects, and by the swift and casual nature of working with paper. Thus, her works on paper may occasionally appear more interesting than elaborate paintings on canvas or fiberboard. In spring 1978, the artist shifted from painting on canvas to textile installation, and a few months later she stopped working on paper. In 2024, the catalogue raisonné of the artist’s work on paper by the art historian Anna Kowalska was published as Ewa Kuryluk. Kangaroo with pencil, brush and scissors, the title referring to Kuryluk’s nickname and her predilection for cutting and collaging.

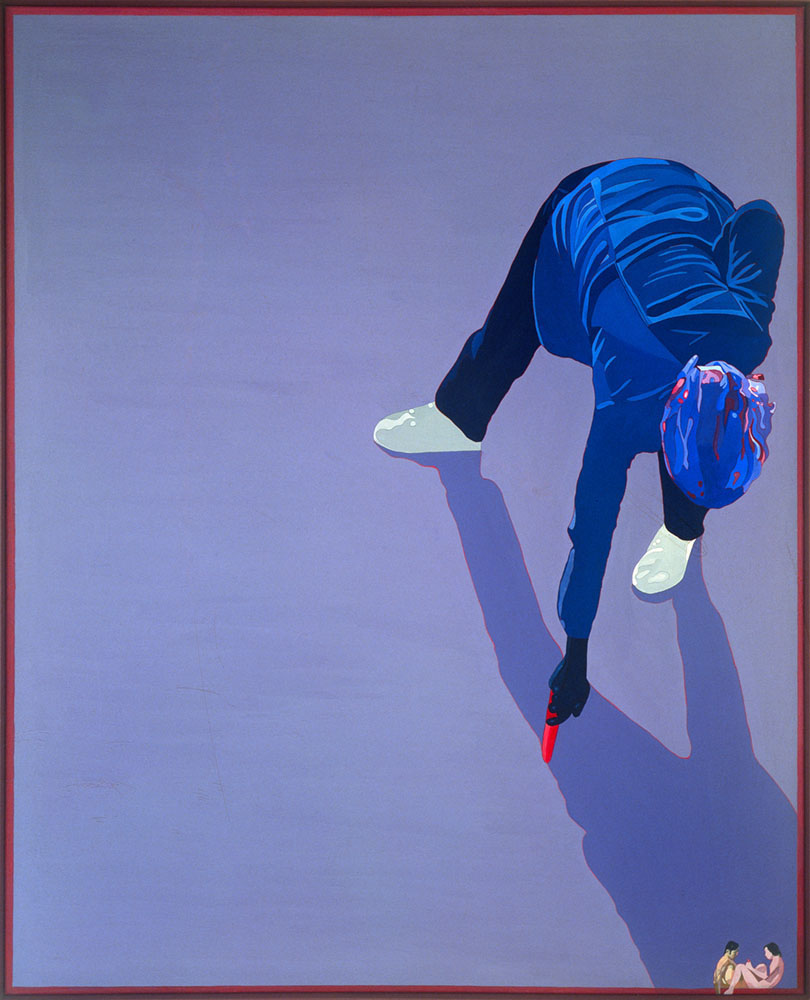
Ewa Kuryluk, "Outlining my Shadow" (1978), acrylic on canvas, 150x120 cm, National Museum, Poznań.

== Painting ==
By 1968 she found her own style and iconography with "Human Landscapes", a series of grotesque paintings in uniform, vivid colors, described by the art historian Mieczyslaw Porebski in the following way: "In her pictures astonishing spaces open up or transform into mazes. Corridors branch out, tunnels cross, city blocks grow into each other, skyscrapers buzz with the hectic business of modern life—bringing to mind a contemporary Tower of Babel, greedy and restless as an anthill". In her next series "Screens", she contrasted TV screens with people watching it. In 1974 she moved on to photorealism, painting portraits and self-portraits after her own photographs. Figures were removed from their surroundings and set against flat abstract backgrounds, suggestive of a wall or open space with small silhouettes and vignettes sporting around. These paintings convey solitude, but they are also peppered with sarcasm, charade and allegory. A tiny king Oedipus, for instance, cut from a reproduction of "Oedipus and the Sphinx" by Jean Auguste Dominique Ingres and painted yellow, is standing on the shoulder of Leszek Kołakowski as if addressing a question to the Polish philosopher. The self-portrait "Outlining my shadow" (1978, National Museum, Poznań) refers to the legendary Corinthian maid who has become the first painter by outlining the profile of her departing lover in the light of the lamp. Shortly after finishing this symbolic self-portrait Kuryluk suffered a crisis. Her sense of color undermined, she abandoned painting on stretched canvas and left England. A temporary teaching job at the Film School in Łódź, then a textile center, made her discover the flexibility of fabric. She had been experimenting with drawing on loose cloth since 1977 but the idea of monumental textile installation, halfway between frescoed architecture and sculpture, crystallized as she looked at draperies in fabric store windows while walking to work.

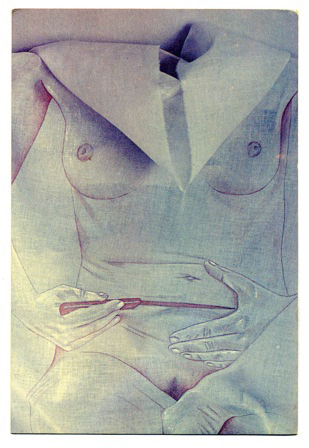
A detail of Ewa Kuryluk's "Interrogation" on the invitation card for her installation at 12th International Sculpture Conference, San Francisco Bay Area, August 6–15, 1982.

== Installation ==
Kuryluk's first installation was made of cheap lining cloth in white, pink and black covered with life-size drawings of the artist and her companion, showing a young couple, their morning on white, their day on pink, their night on black cloth, constituting together a textile room. Eager to play on words and the contrast between totalitarian architecture and private space, the artist titled her installation at the Eastern Wall Gallery (opposite the Palace of Culture, Stalin's "gift" to Warsaw) "In the Four Walls". It opened on 1 March 1979, creating a splash and barely escaping censorship. Her next Warsaw installation was the first in red and white, executed with rusty felt-pen and red and white paint on unbleached cotton, reminiscent of skin.

In the spring of 1981 Kuryluk was invited to International Biennale in Medellín, Colombia, an enormous event with thousands of artists participating, though she was the only one from the Soviet bloc. After having painted her cubicle black, she hung her cotton "skins" with naked body parts cut, sewn and burnt, on washing lines. The installation mirrored family drama but it was perceived as reflective of the situation in Poland, with Solidarity facing a crackdown, and in reference to human rights abuse in Latin America. Shortly after the opening, Pope John Paul was shot in Rome, his white dress splashed with blood. Suddenly, the artist's cubicle attracted such crowds that military police were posted to guard her "skins". This was also the beginning of her career in the United States. Impressed with the installation, Helen Shlien invited her to Boston.

"Room of Memories", made of "bloodied" cotton walls and shrouds draped on the floor and on chairs, was presented through January 1982 at the Helen Shlien Gallery in Boston, and in December it was chosen the best exhibit of the year by "The Boston Globe". In September 1982 "Interrogation", twelve chairs draped with naked self-portraits, were shown at 12th International Sculpture Conference in San Francisco, and later recreated for "Villa dei Misteri" at Art in General, "Textile Sculpture" at the Musée des Beaux Arts in Lausanne, and "Membranes of Memory", her solo show in Buenos Aires.

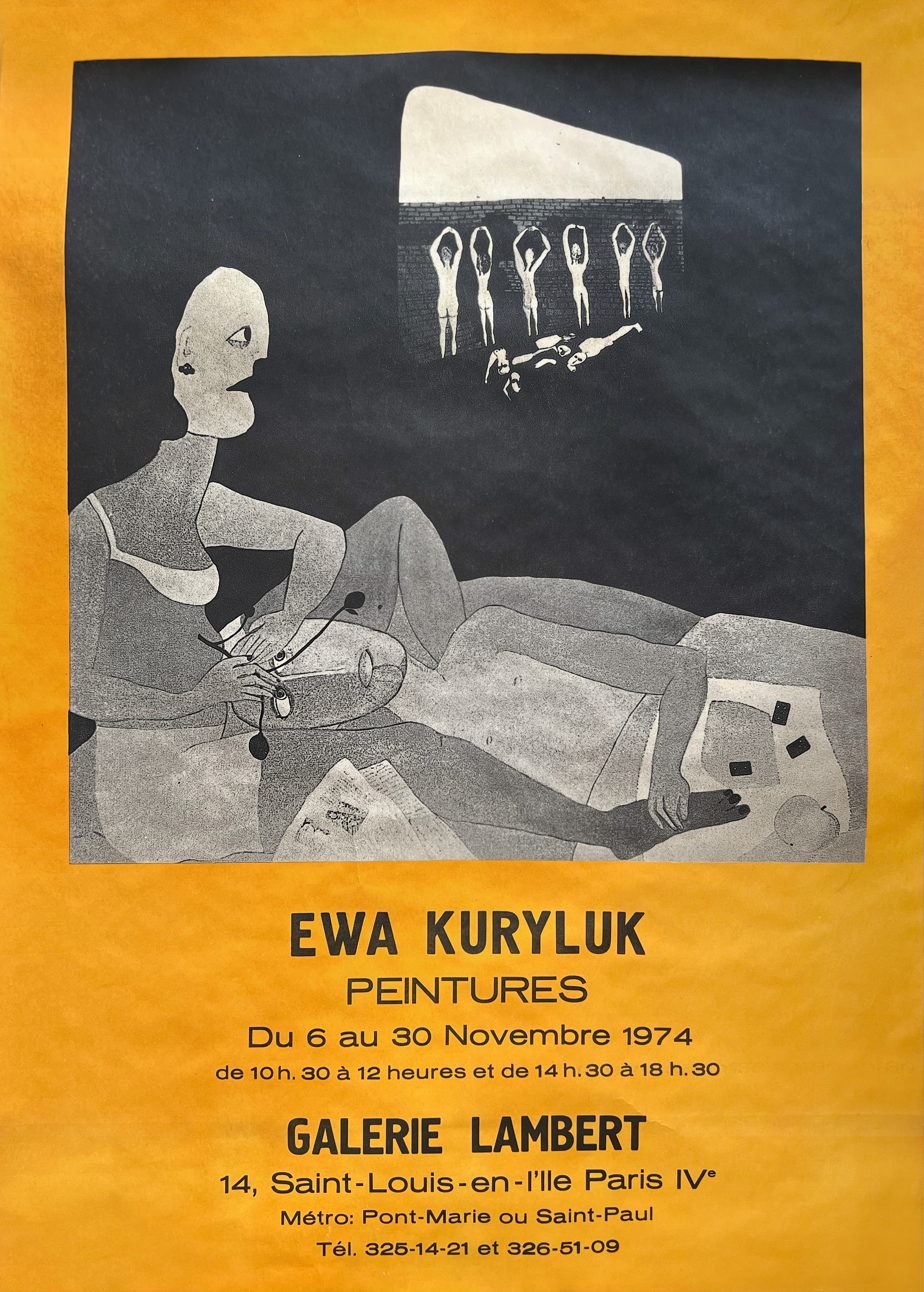
A poster for Ewa Kuryluk's solo exhibition at the Galerie Lambert in Paris, 6–30 November 1974. The painting "Execution" (1970), reproduced on the poster, is today in the collection of Polin, Museum of History of Polish Jews, Warsaw.

"Theater of Love", her second Boston installation was supported by the National Endowment for the Arts. The monumental cloth hall, her largest work to date, was made of cotton walls and columns suspended from the ceiling and bed sheets on the floor with depictions of a couple making love, their bodies larger than life and private parts showing prominently. There was a smell of scandal and Thomas Frick, reviewing the show for "Art in America", pointed out that exact rendition of private eroticism always borders on the political.

While working on her first novel, Kuryluk developed the idea of "Drawritings" by adding script to drawing, and blue to red. "The Dreaming Head", a broken plaster cast covered with texts and placed on a pillow, was used as the cover illustration of her novel, "Century 21". "My Feet", a cotton path with imprints of her foot steps, the left in red expressing her female self, the right in blue acting as her male ego, "talked" to each other while "walking" to the sea on the coral sand beach in Key West.

Kuryluk's first American outdoor installations opened in 1982 in New York's Upper West Side. The 1984–5 Hodder Fellowship at Princeton University gave her opportunity to live outside a big city for the first time. Taken with the campus and the landscape, she made full use of the scenery changing in seasons and documented her installations in hundreds of photographs, some of which were reproduced by Joyce Carol Oates in her "Ontario Review". The 1988–9 Rockefeller Fellowship at National Humanities Center in North Carolina gave her another opportunity of working in outdoors. She was also commissioned by her class to produce a joint indoor installation with the poet Rita Dove, and designed a composition of two cotton scrolls, the vertical with drawings in red, the horizontal with a poem by Dove written in blue.

Kuryluk was awarded a grant from the New York Asian Cultural Council in 1991 in recognition of her contribution to the understanding of the mythology of Amaterasu, the Japanese sun goddess, included in her "Veronica" study. The trip to Japan opened a world for her, and she returned many times, with exhibitions and lectures. Her Japanese outdoor silk installations differed from the cotton ones. Permeated with desire to restore lost harmony between humanity and nature, they were reflective of her affinity to Zen minimalism and Shinto traditions. When hanging from blooming cherry trees in the Imperial Garden in Kyoto, white silk veils seemed to vanish in the air, while the yellow silk cut outs of her brother as small boy shimmered between stone foxes in the Fushimi Inari-taisha shrine in remembrance of his love for animals. When her retrospective in cameo was shown in Fukuoka, a visitor said to the artist: "You must have been Japanese in your former life".

In 2001 Kuryluk shifted to Yellow Installations, a more historical type of work based on childhood recollections, inspired by her mother's hallucinations of yellow birds and yellow snow, symbolic of the mass of Jews with yellow bands and stars destroyed during the Holocaust. She discovered that her Jewish grandparents and other relatives had been among them only after her mother's death when she found letters and photographs stashed away in old winter shoes. She also found her own juvenile work, some of it dealing with the Holocaust, lovingly preserved by her mother and today in the Museum of the History of Polish Jews in Warsaw.

== Photography ==
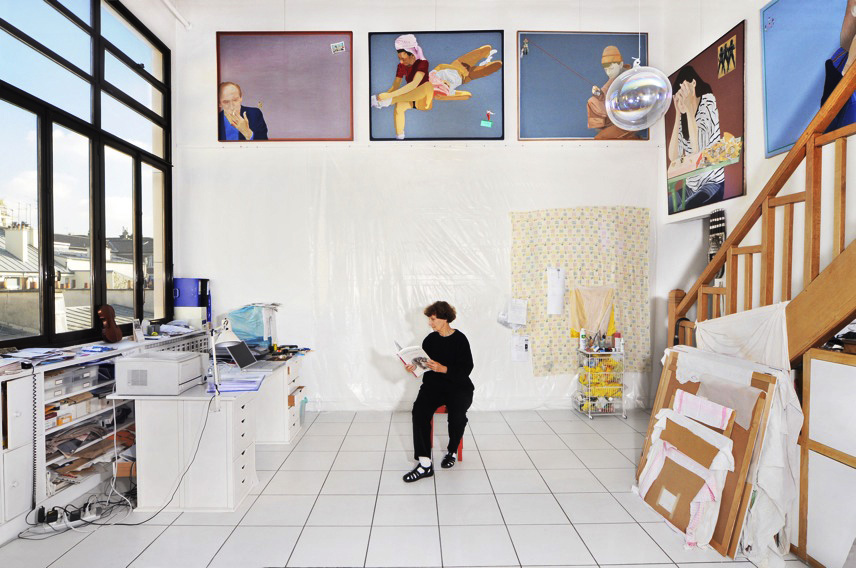
Ewa Kuryluk in her studio, published in her book of paintings, "Outlining the Shadow"; photograph by David Henry.

At the age of 13 Kuryluk embarked on an ongoing project of self-documentation, starting in 1959. Eager to catch fleeting moods and expressions, and to document the process of aging, she worked in series, up to a hundred photos per session. Since she considered her autophotographs a memory aid and a visual diary, she kept them secret for decades. The first small selection was shown only in 2000, a larger one in 2003 at her Retrospective "Air People", at the Zachęta National Gallery, Warsaw. But only in 2009 when "Kangaroo with the Camera: Autophotography 1959–2009" was published that her nickname and the overall influence of photography on her work was revealed. Kuryluk's record of herself brings to mind the fluidity of identity and how the general is visible in the private.

== Literature ==
Kuryluk's first poetry was written in German and published in the high school magazine she founded, which was subsequently banned by the school authorities because of being too "existentialist". In 1967, she debuted in the Warsaw magazine "Ty i Ja" with a travelogue in the form of letters, and she published two collections of poems. Her M.A. thesis was published as "Wiedeńska apokalipsa" (Viennese Apocalypse) in 1974, her first collection of essays on Austrian art and literature around 1900, and her Ph.D. dissertation was released as "Salome albo o Rozkoszy" (Salome or on Voluptuousness) in 1976, a study of the grotesque focusing on Aubrey Beardsley. The book was published in 1986 as Salome and Judas in the Cave of Sex. The Grotesque: Origins, Iconography, Techniques by Northwestern University Press.

In 1982 Kuryluk co-founded with her émigré friends "Zeszyty Literackie" (Literary Notebooks), a quarterly first published in Paris, then from Warsaw with her as co-editor since 1982. She contributed to the "New York Times Book Review", the "New York Review of Books", and "The New Criterion", and was a contributing editor of "Formations". In 1986 she received the General Electric Award for Younger Writers for her essay on Hitler's Vienna. Her scholarly book Veronica and her Cloth: History, Symbolism, and Structure of a "True Image", the first modern study of the Veil of Veronica published by Basil Blackwell in 1991, explores the mythology of mimetic representation as concerns procreation, destruction and art, and leading to photography. The book is representative of her interests and work, but her "veils" and "shrouds", reminiscent of stained sheets and flayed skins, are a departure from Christian symbolism and belong to body art.

Her first novel "Century 21" (1992), a time machine in literary form, was praised by Charles Simic as "a magnificent first novel by one of the best art historians of our time". After her return to Europe, she continued to write and publish in English, but gradually shifted back to Polish. From 1995 through 1999 her column "Art Mon Amour", was published in the weekly cultural magazine of "Gazeta Wyborcza", and then as a book. Her latest autobiographical novels "Goldi" and "Frascati" were nominated for the Nike Literary Prize. She is member of PEN America.

== Theater ==
While teaching at the Institute for Applied Theater Science at Justus Liebig University in Giessen in 1986, Kuryluk adapted "Faust" I and II by Johann Wolfgang von Goethe to a paper theater stage and directed her students performing "Die Faust" (the Fist) with their hands and tiny props. The performance was reflective of the Chernobyl disaster and focused on the threat posed to life on earth by the human "fist". In 1988 she designed and directed "In the Little Manor" by Stanislaw Ignacy Witkiewicz at the off-Broadway Interart Theater in New York City. In 2005 she adapted her novel "Encyklopedierotyk" (Encyclopaedia of Love) for the stage, and designed and directed the play as part of the Polish Festival at the Château de la Petite Malmaison.

== Video & Movies ==
Villa dei misteri (1984), directed and produced by Ewa Kuryluk, is a video featuring the artist's first New York installation at Art in General.

Na cetce zrenicy (On the pupil's dot, 2004) by Andrzej Titkow is a documentary movie on Kuryluk's life and art made for the Second Program of Polish Television.

Vera Icona, Ewa Kuryluk (2009) by Cédric Schiltz is a 65-minute documentary film on Kuryluk's installation art.

== Selected solo exhibitions ==
1970: Paintings and Prints, Woodstock Gallery, London;

1973: Paintings, Drawings & Prints, Christian M. Nebehay Galerie, Vienna;

1974: Tableaux, Galerie Lambert, Paris;

1976: Paintings, Galerie Länderbank, Graz, Austria;

1977: Paintings, National Museum, Wrocław;

1979: In the Four Walls, Eastern Wall Gallery, Warsaw;

1980: Human Landscapes, Art Gallery, Middlesbrough, England;

1982: Room of Memories, Installation, Helen Shlien Gallery, Boston;

1984: Villa dei Misteri, Installation, Art in General, New York;

1985: Seven Black Chairs in the Snow, Outdoor Installation, Princeton University campus, Princeton, NJ;

1986: Membranes of Memory, Centro de Arte y Comunicación, Buenos Aires, and Imprints, Justus-Liebig University, Giessen, Germany;

1987: Theater of Love, Mobius, Boston;

1988: September—Remember, Outdoor Installation, National Humanities Center, Research Triangle Park, NC;

1989: Winter in North Carolina, Outdoor Installation, National Humanities Center, Research Triangle Park, NC;

1990: Skin/Sky—Red/Blue, Drawritings, Installation, Art in General, New York;

1992: Sunset for the Three Survivors, Outdoor Installation, University of California, San Diego;

1995: Who's This Mysterious Boy?, Manhattan Gallery, part of the 8th International Triennial of Tapestry, Łódź;

1996: Three Chairs and a Shroud, Installation, Gerlesborgsskolan, Hamburgsund, Sweden;

1997: Installations (1977–1997), Manggha, Center for Japanese Art and Technology, Kraków;

1998: The Secret Life of Clothes, Installation, Artium Gallery, Fukuoka;

2000: Trio for the Hidden, Installation & Autophotography, Artemis Gallery, Kraków;

2001: Cotton Skins, Installation, Latitude 53, Edmonton, Canada;

2002: A Woman Artist, Austrian Cultural Forum, Bratislava, Slovakia;

2003: Air People, Retrospective, Zacheta National Gallery, Warsaw;

2004: Bonjour, Rolo, Performance & Installation, Château de la Petite Malmaison;

2005: Taboo, Installation, Artemis Gallery, Kraków;

2009: Paris in Warsaw, reconstruction of Kuryluk's Painting Exhibition at the Galerie Lambert, Paris, 1974 & New Autophotographs, Art+on, Warsaw;

2011: Paintings, Installations & Autophotographs, BWA Gallery, Wrocław, and Pony, Yellow Installation, Paintings, Chairs & Autophotographs, Czytelnia Sztuki, Gliwice;

2016: Don't Dream about love, Kuryluk. Paintings 1967–1978, National Museum, Kraków;

2019: Cracow 1946, Yellow Installation, Artemis Art Gallery, Kraków;

2021: White Folds of Time, installations, National Museum, Wrocław;

2022: I, White Kangaroo, Palazzo Querini, Venice. Official collateral event organized by the Starak Foundation at the 59th International Art Biennale in Venice;

2024: Meeting on the Seashore, Państwowa Galeria Sztuki, Sopot.

== Selected catalogues ==
- Ewa Kuryluk, W czterech ścianach (In the four walls), Galeria Ściana Wschodnia, Warsaw 1979
- The Fabric of Memory. Ewa Kuryluk: Cloth Works 1978–1987, with essays by Jan Kott, Edmund White, Elzbieta Grabska, Ewa Kuryluk, Wilmette, Illinois, Formations, 1987
- Rysunki i Instalacje 1977–1994 (Drawings and Installations), ZPAP, Warsaw, 1994
- Rysunki i Instalacje: Drawings and Installations 1974–1996, Center of Japanese Art & Technology Manggha & Galeria Artemis, Kraków, 1996
- The Secret Life of Clothes, Installation, organized and introduced by Nick Wadley, Artium Gallery, Fukuoka, 1998
- Trio dla ukrytych (Trio for the Hidden), Galeria Artemis, Kraków, 2000
- Ludzie z powietrza: Air People, Galeria Artemis, Kraków, 2002
- Tabus: Taboo My Cheri, Galeria Artemis & Jewish Culture Festival, Kraków, 2005
- Droga do Koryntu: On the Way to Corinth, Twój Styl, Warsaw, 2006
- Kangaroo with the Camera: 1959–2009, Autophotography, Artemis & Art+on & Wydawnictwo Literackie, Kraków & Warsaw, 2009
- Obrysować Cień. Malarstwo 1968–1978 (Outlining the Shadow. Painting 1968–1978), BWA Design Wrocław & Czytelnia Sztuki, Gliwice & Galeria Artemis, Kraków & Wydawnictwo Literackie, 2011
- Żółte Instalacje 2001–2011 (Yellow Installations 2001–2011), with commentaries by Ola Wojtkiewicz, Stowarzyszenie Inicjatyw Wydawniczych w Katowicach & Czytelnia Sztuki/Muzeum w Gliwicach, 2011
- Anna Kowalska, Ewa Kuryluk. Kangór z ołówkiem, pędzlem i nożyczkami, Fundacja Frascati & Galeria Artemis & Zachęta – Narodowa Galeria Sztuki, Kraków & Warsaw, 2024

== Selected public collections ==
National Museum, Warsaw; Zachęta – National Gallery of Art, Warsaw; National Museum, Kraków; National Museum, Poznań; National Museum, Wrocław; Museum of Modern Art, Łódź; Museum of the History of Polish Jews, Warsaw; Bibliothèque Nationale, Paris; Graphische Sammlung Albertina, Vienna; Kettle's Yard Museum, Cambridge, England; Bass Museum of Art, Miami Beach, FL; National Humanities Center, NC.

== Literary works ==
=== Poems and novels ===
- Kontur: Wiersze z lat 1972–1975 (Collected Poems), Wydawnictwo Literackie, Kraków, 1979
- Pani Anima: Wiersze z lat 1975–1979 (Collected Poems), Wydawnictwo Literackie, Kraków, 1984
- Century 21, novel, Normal IL, Dalkey Archive Press, 1992
- Grand Hotel Oriental, Wydawnictwo WAB, Warsaw, 1997
- Encyklopedierotyk, Sic!, Warsaw, 2001
- Goldi, Twoj Styl, Warsaw, 2004; second edition WL, 2011
- Frascati, Wydawnictwo Literackie, Kraków, 2009

== Art history and essays ==
- Wiedenska Apokalipsa (Viennese Art and Literature Around 1900), Wydawnictwo Literackie, Kraków, 1974
- Salome albo o Rozkoszy (The Grotesque in the Work of Aubrey Beardsley), Wydawnictwo Literackie, Kraków, 1976
- Hiperrealizm: Nowy Realizm, WAiF, Warsaw, 1979
- Podróż do granic sztuki (Collected Essays), Wydawnictwo Literackie, Kraków, 1982
- Salome and Judas in the Cave of Sex. The Grotesque: Origins, Iconography, Techniques, Evanston, IL, Northwestern University Press, 1987
- Veronica & Her Cloth: History, Symbolism and Structure of a "True" Image, Oxford, Basil Blackwell, 1991
- Art Mon Amour, Sic!, Warsaw, 2002

== Fellowships & awards ==
- 1964: Fellow of the Italian Institute in Vienna at the University of Urbino, Italy
- 1982: European Exchange Program Award, Institute for the Humanities at New York University
- 1982: Room of Memories, Installation at Helen Shlien Gallery in Boston, chosen as one of the Best 1982 art shows by the Boston Globe
- 1983–1985: Fellow at the Institute for the Humanities at New York University
- 1984–1985: Hodder Fellow, Princeton University, NJ
- 1985: Fund for Free Expression Award, New York City
- 1986: General Electric Award for Younger Writers
- 1988: Honorary Prize at the 4th International Drawing Triennale in Wrocław
- 1988–1989: Rockefeller Fellowship, National Humanities Center, NC
- 1991: Asian Cultural Council Fellowship in Japan
- 1994: Cultural Foundation Award, Warsaw
- 2005: The novel Goldi was a finalist of the Nike Literary Prize
- 2010: The novel Frascati was nominated for the Nike Literary Prize
- 2012: Gloria Artis Award for merit to Polish culture
- 2016: The Warsaw Book Premiere Prize for the book Manhattan and Little Venice
- 2021: The Tuwim Literary Prize for Life Achievement
- 2024: Honorary degree from the Academy of Fine Arts, Gdańsk
