= List of poets =

This is an alphabetical list of internationally notable poets.

== A ==
=== Ab–Ak ===
- Jonathan Aaron (born 1941), US poet
- Aarudhra (1925–1998), Indian Telugu poet, born Bhagavatula Sadasiva Sankara Sastry
- Chris Abani (born 1966), Nigerian poet
- Henry Abbey (1842–1911), US poet
- Eleanor Hallowell Abbott (1872–1958), US poet and fiction writer
- Siôn Abel (fl. 18th c.), Welsh balladeer
- Aria Aber (born 1991), Afghan poet and novelist, resides in the US, writes and publishes primarily in English
- Lascelles Abercrombie (1881–1938), English poet and literary critic
- Arthur Talmage Abernethy (1872–1956), US journalist, minister, scholar; North Carolina Poet Laureate, 1948-1953
- Abu Sa'id Abu'l-Khayr (967–1049), Persian poet
- Sam Abrams (1935–2023), US poet, editor and critic
- Seth Abramson (born 1976), US poet
- Kosta Abrašević (1879–1898), Serbian poet
- Dannie Abse (1923–2014), Welsh poet in English
- Kathy Acker (1947–1997), US experimental novelist, punk poet and playwright
- Diane Ackerman (born 1948), US author, poet and naturalist
- Duane Ackerson (1942–2020), US writer of speculative poetry and fiction
- Milton Acorn (1923–1986), Canadian poet, writer and playwright
- Harold Acton (1904–1994), English writer, scholar and dilettante
- János Aczél (died 1523), Hungarian poet and provost
- Tamás Aczél (1921–1994), Hungarian poet
- Gilbert Adair (1944–2011), Scottish novelist, poet and critic
- Virginia Hamilton Adair (1919–2004), US poet
- Helen Adam (1909–1993), Scottish-US poet, collagist and photographer
- Draginja Adamović (1925–2000), Serbian poet
- John Adams (1704–1740), US poet
- Léonie Adams (1899–1988), US poet; U.S. Poet Laureate, 1948–1949
- Ryan Adams (born 1974), US singer-songwriter and writer
- Hendrik Adamson (1891–1946), Estonian poet
- Fleur Adcock (1934–2024), New Zealand poet mainly in England
- Joseph Addison (1672–1719), English essayist, poet, writer and politician
- Kim Addonizio (born 1954), US poet and novelist
- Artur Adson (1889–1977), Estonian poet
- Endre Ady (1877–1919), Hungarian poet
- Mariska Ady (1888–1977), Hungarian poet
- Aeschylus (525–456 BCE), Athenian tragedian
- Anastasia Afanasieva (born 1982), Ukrainian physician, poet, writer, translator
- Lucius Afranius (fl. c. 94 BCE), Roman comic poet
- John Agard (born 1949), Afro-Guyanese poet and children's writer
- Sheetal Agashe (born 1977), Indian poet and businesswoman
- Patience Agbabi (born 1965), British poet and performer
- James Agee (1909–1955), US novelist, screenwriter, and poet
- Deborah Ager (born 1977), US poet and editor
- István Ágh (1938–2025), Hungarian poet
- Kelli Russell Agodon (born 1969), US poet
- Dritëro Agolli (1931–2017), Albanian poet
- Carlos Martínez Aguirre (born 1974), Spanish poet
- Delmira Agustini (1886–1914), Uruguayan poet
- Ishaaq bin Ahmed (1095 – 12th century), Arab scholar, poet and ancestor of the Somali Isaaq clan-family
- Ai (Florence Anthony, 1947–2010), US poet
- Ama Ata Aidoo (1940–2023), Ghanaian novelist, poet, playwright and academic
- Conrad Aiken (1889–1973), US poet and author; U.S. Poet Laureate, 1950–1952
- Aganice Ainianos (1838–1892), Greek poet
- Akazome Emon (956–1041), Japanese poet and historian
- Mark Akenside (1721–1770), English poet and physician
- Rachel Akerman (1522–1544), Austrian Jewish poet writing in German
- Mehdi Akhavan-Sales (1929–1990), Iranian poet, Persian poet
- Bella Akhmadulina (1937–2010), Russian poet
- Anna Akhmatova (1889–1966), Russian poet
- Jan Nisar Akhtar (1914–1976), Indian Urdu poet
- Javed Akhtar (born 1945), Indian poet, lyricist and scriptwriter
- Salman Akhtar (born 1946), Indian US professor and poet writing in English and Urdu

=== Al–Am ===
- Amina Al Adwan (born 1944), Jordanian writer, poet and critic
- Ali al-Marhun (1916–2010), Saudi faqīh and poet
- Muhammad Taha Al-Qaddal (1951–2021), Sudanese poet
- Luigi Alamanni (1495–1556), Italian poet and statesman
- Alasdair mac Mhaighstir Alasdair (c. 1698–1770), Scottish Gaelic poet
- Ave Alavainu (1942–2022), Estonian poet
- Gillebríghde Albanach (fl. 1200–1230), Scottish Gaelic poet and crusader
- Alcaeus (4th c. BCE), Athenian comic poet in Greek
- Alcaeus of Messene (fl. late 3rd/early 2nd c. BCE), Greek writer of verse epigrams
- Alcaeus of Mytilene (7th–6th c. BCE), Greek lyric poet from Lesbos
- Ammiel Alcalay (born 1956), US poet, scholar and critic
- Alcman (fl. 7th c. BCE), Ancient Greek lyric poet
- Amos Bronson Alcott (1799–1888), US poet and teacher
- Richard Aldington (1892–1962), English poet and writer
- Vasile Alecsandri (1821–1890), Romanian poet
- Tudur Aled (c. 1465–1525), Welsh poet writing in Welsh
- Claribel Alegría (1924–2018), Central US poet writing in Spanish
- Vicente Aleixandre (1898–1984), Spanish poet, Nobel Laureate 1977
- Josip Murn Aleksandrov (1879–1901), Slovene symbolist poet
- Louis Alemayehu (born 1945), US poet, educator and musician
- Sherman Alexie (born 1966), US poet and writer
- Felipe Alfau (1902–1999), Catalan US novelist and poet
- Agha Shahid Ali (1949–2001), Indian, Kashmiri and US poet
- Taha Muhammad Ali (1931–2011), Palestinian poet
- Dante Alighieri (1265–1321), Italian poet
- Ali al-Hujwiri (1009–1072), Persian poet
- James Alexander Allan (1889–1956), Australian poet
- August Alle (1899–1952), Estonian poet
- Dick Allen (1939–2017), US poet, critic and academic
- Donald Allen (1912–2004), US poet, editor and translator
- Elizabeth Akers Allen (1832–1911), US author and poet
- Ron Allen (1947–2010), US poet and playwright
- Artur Alliksaar (1923–1966), Estonian poet
- William Allingham (1824 or 1828–1889), Irish poet and man of letters
- Washington Allston (1779–1843), US painter and poet
- Damaso Alonso (1898–1990), Spanish poet, philologist and critic
- Alta (Alta Gerrey; 1942–2024), US poet and writer
- Natan Alterman (1910–1970), Israeli poet, journalist and translator
- Alurista (born 1947), Chicano poet and activist
- Al Alvarez (fl. 1929–2019), English poet
- Julia Alvarez (born 1950), Dominican-US poet, novelist and essayist
- Betti Alver (1906–1989), Estonian poet
- Moniza Alvi (born 1954), Pakistani-British poet and writer
- Guru Amar Das (1479–1574), Punjabi poet and Sikh guru
- Ambroise (fl. c. 1190), Norman-French poet of Third Crusade
- Yehuda Amichai (1924–2000), Israeli poet
- Indran Amirthanayagam (born 1960), Sri Lankan US poet, essayist and translator
- Kingsley Amis (1922–1995), English author and poet
- Majeed Amjad (1914–1974), Indian/Pakistani poet in Urdu
- A. R. Ammons (1926–2001), US author and poet

=== An–Aq ===
- Anacreon (570–488 BCE), Greek lyric poet
- Alfred Andersch (1914–1980), German writer and publisher
- Mir Anees (or Anis) (1803–1874), Indian poet in Urdu
- Guda Anjaiah (1955–2016), Telugu Indian poet, singer, lyricist and writer from Telangana
- Anvari (1117–1157), Persian poet
- Temsüla Ao (1945–2022), Indian Naga poet, short story writer, and ethnographer
- Hans Christian Andersen (1805–1875), Danish poet and children's writer
- Victor Henry Anderson (1917–2001), US poet, kahuna and teacher of the Feri Tradition
- Carlos Drummond de Andrade (1902–1987), Brazilian poet
- Mário de Andrade (1893–1945), Brazilian poet, novelist and critic
- Bernard André (1450–1522), French Augustinian poet: poet laureate to Henry VII of England
- Peter Andrej (born 1959), Slovenian poet and musician
- Sophia de Mello Breyner Andresen (1919–2004), Portuguese poet and writer
- Bruce Andrews (born 1948), US poet of language
- Kevin Andrews (1924–1989), Anglo-Greek philhellene writer and archeologist
- Ron Androla (born 1954), US poet
- Aneirin (fl. 6th c.), Brythonic epic poet
- Guru Angad (1504–1552), Sikh Guru and Punjabi poet
- Ralph Angel (1951–2020), US poet and translator
- Maya Angelou (1928–2014), US poet
- James Stout Angus (1830–1923), Shetland poet mainly in Shetland dialect
- Marion Angus (1865–1946), Scottish poet in Scots
- J. K. Annand (1908–1993), Scottish children's poet
- Mika Antić (1932–1986), Serbian poet
- David Antin (1932–2016), US poet and critic
- Antler (born 1946), US poet
- Susanne Antonetta (born 1956), US poet and author
- Brother Antoninus (1912–1994), US poet
- Raymond Antrobus (living), British poet and educator
- Chairil Anwar (1922–1949), Indonesian poet
- Johannes Anyuru (born 1979), Swedish poet
- Guillaume Apollinaire (1880–1918), French poet
- Apollonius of Rhodes (270 – post–245 BCE), Greek poet and librarian in Alexandria
- Maja Apostoloska (born 1976), Macedonian poet
- Philip Appleman (1926–2020), US poet and professor
- Lajos Áprily (1887–1967), Hungarian poet and translator
- Pawlu Aquilina (1929–2009), Maltese poet

=== Ar ===
- Louis Aragon (1897–1982), French poet, novelist and editor
- János Arany (1817–1882), Hungarian poet
- Archilochus (c. 680 – c. 645 BCE), Greek lyric poet
- Allamraju Subrahmanyakavi (1831–1892), Indian Telugu poet
- Walter Conrad Arensberg (1878–1954), US dadaist, critic and poet
- Tudor Arghezi (1880–1967), Romanian poet
- Ludovico Ariosto (1474–1533), Italian poet
- Aristophanes (c. 446 – c. 386 BCE), Greek dramatic poet
- Guru Arjan (1563–1606), Sikh guru and Punjabi poet
- Rae Armantrout (born 1947), US language poet
- Simon Armitage (born 1963), English poet, playwright and novelist
- Richard Armour (1906–1989), US poet and author
- Ernst Moritz Arndt (1769–1860), German author and poet
- Bettina von Arnim (1785–1859), German writer, composer and visual artist
- Ludwig Achim von Arnim (1781–1831), German poet and novelist
- Craig Arnold (1967–2009), US poet and professor
- Matthew Arnold (1822–1888), English poet and cultural critic
- Arnórr Þórðarson jarlaskáld (Poet of Earls, c. 1012 – 1070s), Icelandic skald
- Franciszka Arnsztajnowa (1865–1942), Polish poet
- Jean Arp (1886–1966), German-French sculptor, painter and poet
- Antonin Artaud (1896–1948), French playwright, poet and essayist

=== As–Az ===
- Asadi Tusi (1000–1073), Persian poet

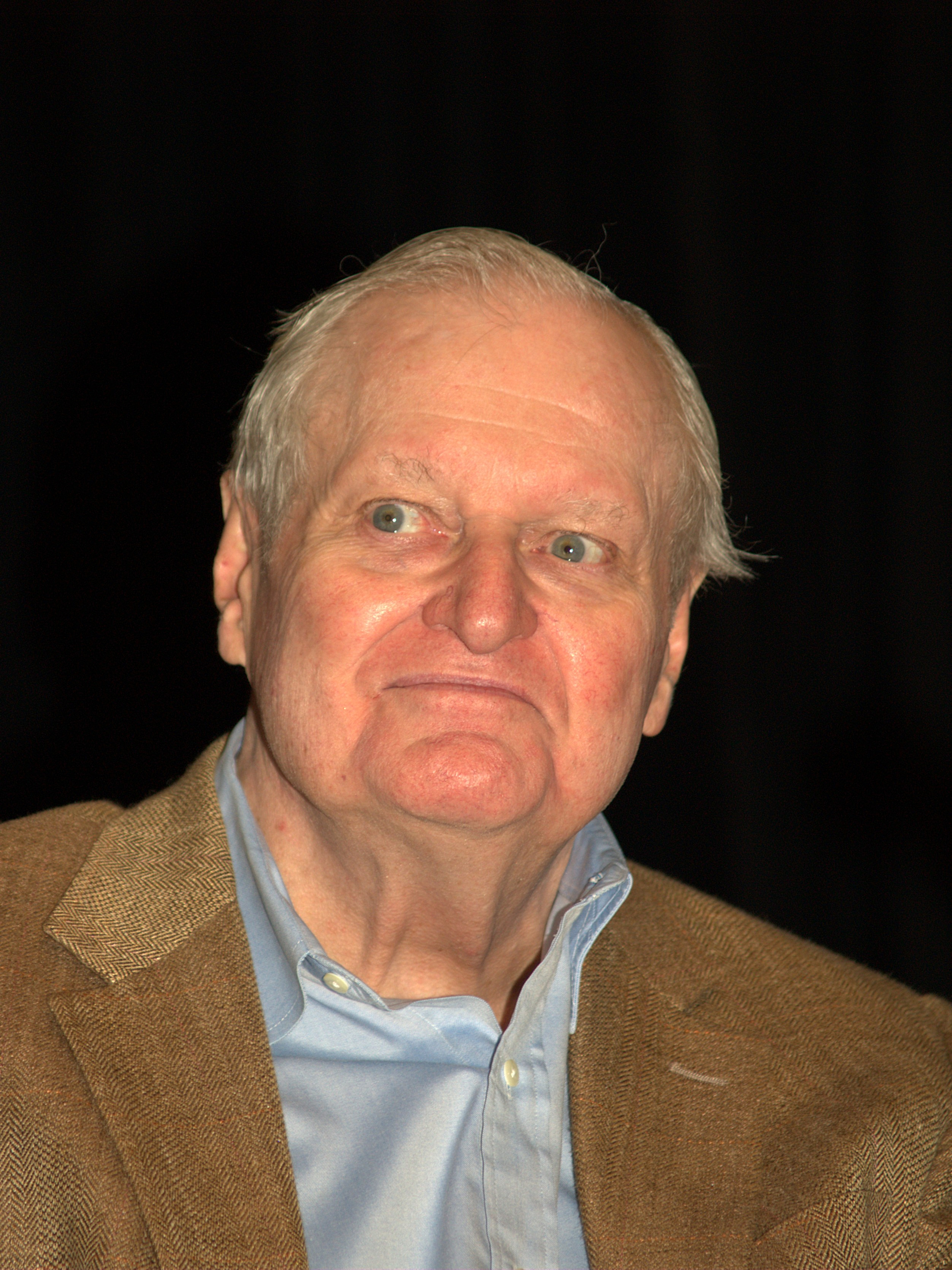
John Ashbery

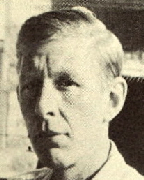
W. H. Auden

- M. K. Asante (born 1982), US author, poet and professor
- John Ashbery (1927–2017), US poet, 1976 Pulitzer Prize for Poetry
- Cliff Ashby (1919–2012), English poet and novelist
- Renée Ashley, US poet and novelist
- Anton Aškerc (1856–1912), Slovenian poet and Roman Catholic priest
- Asjadi (10th–11th c.), Persian poet
- Adam Asnyk (1838–1897), Polish poet and dramatist
- Herbert Asquith (1881–1947), English poet
- Mina Assadi (born 1942), Iranian poet, Persian poet, author and songwriter
- Vishnu Raj Atreya (1944–2020), Nepali poet, author, songwriter and novelist
- Margaret Atwood (born 1939), Canadian poet, novelist and essayist
- W. H. Auden (1907–1973), Anglo-US poet, essayist
- Imre Augustich (Imre Augustič, 1837–1879), Slovenian/Hungarian poet
- Joseph Auslander (1897–1965), US poet, anthologist and novelist; U.S. Poet Laureate, 1937–1941
- Ausonius (c. 310–395), Latin poet and rhetorician at Burdigala (Bordeaux)
- Paul Auster (1947–2024), US poet, novelist, playwright, essayist, and translator
- James Avery (1945–2013), US actor, poet and screenwriter
- Margaret Avison (1918–2007), Canadian poet
- Krayem Awad (born 1948), Viennese painter, sculptor and poet of Syrian origin
- Gennady Aygi (1934–2006), Russian poet
- Ayo Ayoola-Amale (born 1970), Nigerian poet
- Ayinampudi Srilakshmi (born 1967), Telugu poet
- Pam Ayres (born 1947), English humorous poet
- Robert Aytoun (1570–1638), Scottish poet
- Maryam Jafari Azarmani (born 1977), Iranian poet, Persian poet, essayist, critic and translator
- Azraqi (11th c.), Persian poet
- Jody Azzouni (born 1954), US philosopher and poet

== B ==
=== Ba ===
- Baba Tahir (11th c.), Persian poet
- Mihály Babits (1883–1941), Hungarian poet and translator
- Ken Babstock (born 1970), Canadian poet
- Jimmy Santiago Baca (born 1952), US poet and writer of Apache/Chicano descent
- Bacchylides (fl. 5th c. BCE), Greek lyric poet
- Bellamy Bach (fl. 1980s), joint pseudonym of fiction writers and poets
- Harivansh Rai Bachchan (fl. 20th c.), Hindi poet
- Joseph M. Bachelor (also Joseph Morris, 1889–1947), US author, poet and educator
- Simon Bacher (1823–1891), Hebrew poet in Hungary
- Ingeborg Bachmann (1926–1973), Austrian poet and author
- Sutardji Calzoum Bachri (born 1941), Indonesian poet
- George Bacovia (1881–1957), Romanian poet
- Krzysztof Kamil Baczyński (1921–1944), Polish poet and soldier
- Vahshi Bafqi (1532–1583) Persian poet
- Julio Baghy (1891–1967), Hungarian Esperanto author and poet
- Mohammad-Taqi Bahar (1886–1951), Persian poet
- Bai Juyi (772–846), Chinese poet of the Tang dynasty
- Joanna Baillie (1762–1851), Scottish poet and dramatist
- József Bajza (1804–1858), Hungarian poet and critic
- Józef Baka (1706/1707–1788), Polish/Lithuanian poet and Jesuit priest
- Vyt Bakaitis (born 1940), Lithuania-US translator, editor and poet
- David Baker (born 1954), US poet
- Hinemoana Baker (born 1968), New Zealand poet and musician
- Bâkî (1526–1600), Ottoman-Turkish language poet (pseudonym of Mahmud Abdülbâkî)
- John Balaban (born 1943), US poet and translator
- Bálint Balassi (1554–1594), Hungarian poet
- Béla Balázs (1884–1949), Hungarian poet and critic
- Edward Balcerzan (born 1937), Polish poet, critic and translator
- Stanisław Baliński (1898–1984), Polish poet and diplomat
- Jesse Ball (born 1978), US poet and novelist
- Zsófia Balla (born 1949), Hungarian poet from Romania
- Addie L. Ballou (1837–1916), US poet and suffragist
- Konstantin Balmont (1867–1942), Russian symbolist poet and translator
- Russell Banks (1940–2023), US fiction writer and poet
- Anne Bannerman (1765–1829), Scottish poet
- Amiri Baraka (aka Leroi Jones) (1934–2014), US writer, poet and dramatist
- Marcin Baran (born 1963), Polish poet and journalist
- Stanisław Barańczak (1946–2014), Polish poet, critic and translator
- Porfirio Barba-Jacob (1883–1942), Colombian poet and writer
- Anna Laetitia Barbauld (1743–1825), English poet, essayist and children's author
- John Barbour (c. 1320–1395), Scottish poet, first major writer in Scots
- Nidia Barboza (born 1954), Costa Rican poet and feminist activist
- Alexander Barclay (c. 1476–1552), English/Scottish poet
- George Barker (1913–1991), English poet and author
- Les Barker (1947–2023), English poet
- Christine Barkhuizen le Roux (1959–2020), South African poet
- Coleman Barks (1937–2026), US poet
- Mihály Barla (Miháo Barla, c. 1778–1824), Slovenian poet and pastor in Hungary
- Mary Barnard (1909–2001), US poet, biographer and translator
- Djuna Barnes (1892–1982), US writer
- William Barnes (1801–1886), English writer, poet and philologist
- Catherine Barnett (born 1960), US poet and educator
- Richard Barnfield (1574–1620), English poet
- Willis Barnstone (born 1927), US poet and literary translator
- Maria Barrell (died 1803), poet, playwright and writer of periodicals
- Laird Barron (born 1970), US poet, author
- Sándor Barta (1897–1938), Hungarian poet executed in USSR
- Bernard Barton (1784–1849), English poet and Quaker
- Bertha Hirsch Baruch (fl. late 18th – early 19th c.), US writer, poet and suffragist
- Todd Bash (born 1965), US avant-garde playwright, poet and writer
- Matsuo Bashō (1644–1694), Japanese renku and haiku poet
- Michael Basinski (born 1950), US text, visual and sound poet
- Ellen Bass (born 1947), US poet
- Arlo Bates (1850–1918), US author, poet and educator
- David Bates (1809–1870), US poet
- Joseph Bathanti (born 1953), US poet, writer and professor; North Carolina Poet Laureate, 2012–2014
- János Batsányi (1763–1845), Hungarian poet
- Dawn-Michelle Baude (born 1959), US poet, journalist and educator
- Charles Baudelaire (1821–1867), French poet, essayist and translator
- Edward Baugh (1936–2023), Jamaican poet and scholar
- Cirilo Bautista (1941–2018), Philippines poet, writer and critic
- Charles Baxter (born 1947), US writer and poet
- James K. Baxter (1926–1972), New Zealand poet

=== Be ===
- Jan Beatty (born 1952), US poet
- Francis Beaumont (1584–1616), English poet and dramatist
- Samuel Beckett (1906–1989), Irish avant-garde playwright, novelist and poet
- Joshua Beckman (living), US poet
- Matija Bećković (born 1939), Serbian writer and poet
- Gustavo Adolfo Bécquer (1836–1870), Spanish poet and fiction writer
- Thomas Lovell Beddoes (1803–1849), English poet, dramatist and physician
- Patricia Beer (1919–1999), English poet and critic
- Sapargali Begalin (1895–1983), Kazakh poet
- Aphra Behn (1640–1689), English Restoration dramatist; early professional female writer
- Ferenc Békássy (1893–1915), Hungarian poet
- Erin Belieu (born 1967), US poet
- Marvin Bell (1937–2020), US poet and teacher; Poet Laureate of Iowa, 2000–2004
- Gioconda Belli (born 1948), Nicaraguan poet and novelist
- Giuseppe Gioachino Belli (1791–1863), Italian sonneteer in Romanesco
- Xuan Bello (1965–2025), Asturian poet
- Hilaire Belloc (1870–1953), Anglo-French writer and historian
- Andrei Bely (1880–1934), Russian novelist, poet and critic
- Stephen Vincent Benét (1898–1943), US author, poet and fiction writer
- William Rose Benét (1886–1950), US poet, writer and editor
- Elizabeth Benger (1775–1827), English poet, biographer and novelist
- Gottfried Benn (1886–1956), German essayist, novelist and expressionist poet
- Gwendolyn B. Bennett (1902–1981), African-US writer and poet
- Jim Bennett (born 1951), English poet in Liverpool punk era
- Louise Bennett-Coverley or Miss Lou (1919–2006), Jamaican poet and folklorist
- Richard Berengarten (born 1943), English poet, writer and translator
- Bo Bergman (1869–1967), Swedish writer and critic
- İlhan Berk (1918–2008), Turkish poet
- Charles Bernstein (born 1950), US poet and scholar
- Béroul (12th c.), Norman poet of episodic Tristan
- Daniel Berrigan (1921–2016), US poet, priest and peace activist
- Ted Berrigan (1934–1983), US poet
- James Berry (1924–2017), Jamaican poet based in England
- Wendell Berry (born 1934), US man of letters, critic and farmer
- John Berryman (1914–1972), US poet and scholar
- Dániel Berzsenyi (1776–1836), Hungarian poet
- Mary Ursula Bethell (1874–1945), New Zealand poet and social worker
- John Betjeman (1906–1984), English poet, writer and broadcaster
- Elizabeth Beverley (fl. 1815–1830), English poet, writer and entertainer
- Helen Bevington (1906–2001), US poet, prose writer and educator
- L. S. Bevington (1845–1895), English anarchist poet and essayist

=== Bh–Bl ===
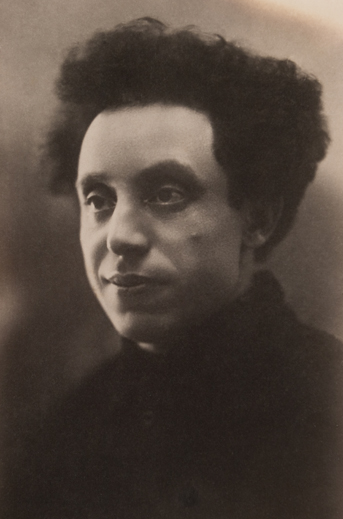
Źmitrok Biadula

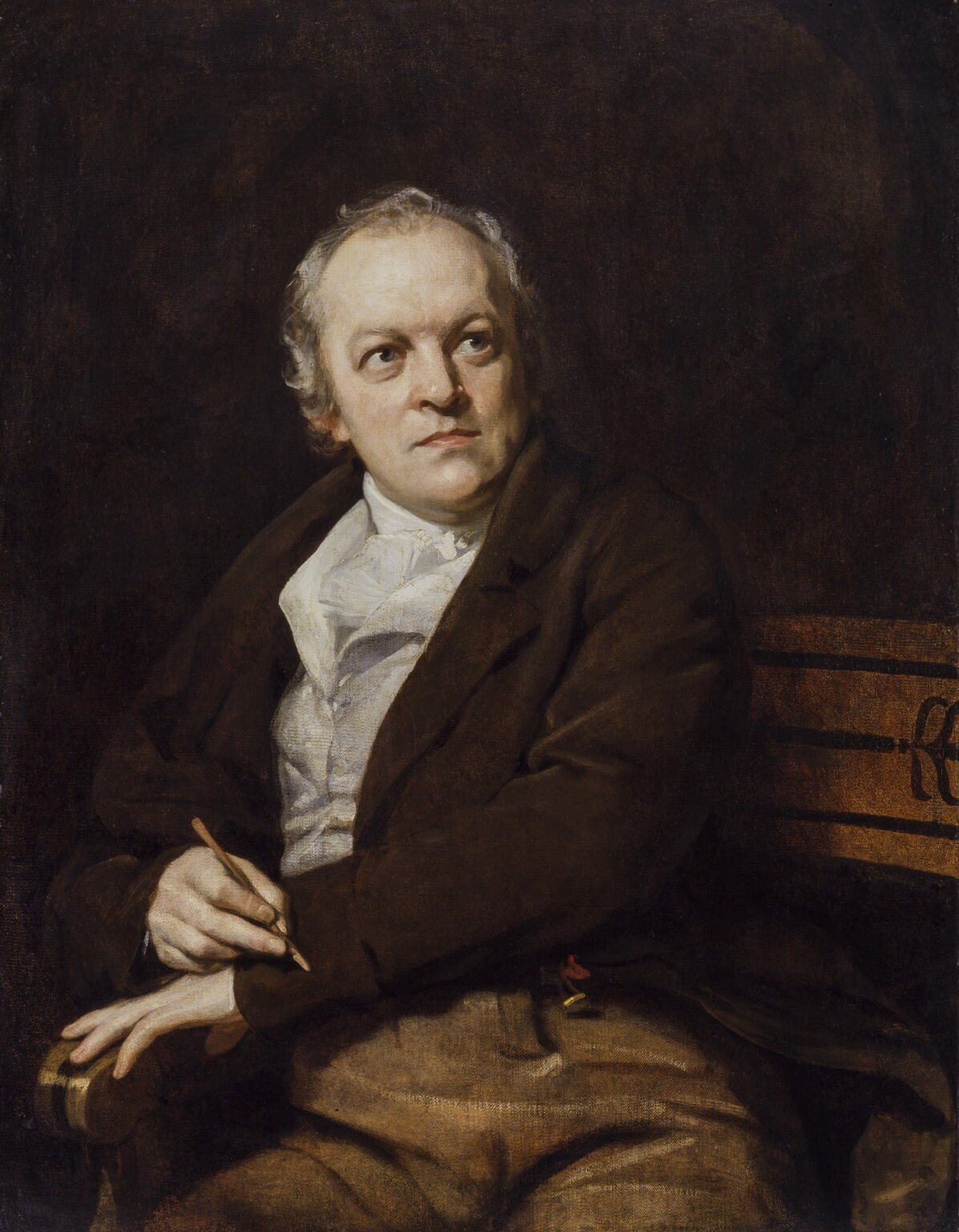
William Blake

- Subramanya Bharathi (1882–1921), Tamil writer, poet and Indian independence activist
- Sujata Bhatt (born 1956), Indian poet in Gujarati
- Źmitrok Biadula (1886–1941), Jewish Belarusian poet, prose writer and independence activist
- Miron Białoszewski (1922–1983), Polish poet, novelist and playwright
- Zbigniew Bieńkowski (1913–1994), Polish poet, critic and translator
- Biernat of Lublin (c. 1465 – post-1529), Polish poet and fabulist
- Brian Bilston (born 1970), English poet and humourist
- Laurence Binyon (1879–1943), English poet, dramatist and art scholar
- Belayet Hossain Birbhumi (1887—1984), Bangladeshi theologian, poet and academic
- Earle Birney (1904–1995), Canadian poet, fiction writer and dramatist
- Nevin Birsa (1947–2003), Slovene poet
- Balázs Birtalan (1969–2016), Hungarian poet and publicist
- Elizabeth Bishop (1911–1979), US poet and short-story writer; U.S. Poet Laureate, 1949-1950
- Ram Prasad Bismil (1897–1927), poet and revolutionary writing in Urdu and Hindi
- Bill Bissett (born 1939), Canadian anti-conventional poet
- Sherwin Bitsui (born 1975), US Navajo poet
- Bjørnstjerne Martinius Bjørnson, (1832–1910) Nobel Prize-winning Norwegian poet
- Paul Blackburn (1926–1971), US poet
- Richard Palmer Blackmur (1904–1965), US literary critic and poet
- Lucian Blaga (1895–1961), Romanian philosopher, poet and playwright
- William Blake (1757–1827), English painter, poet and printmaker
- Don Blanding (1894–1957), US poet, journalist, writer and speaker
- Adrian Blevins (born 1964), US poet
- Mathilde Blind (1841–1896), German-born English poet and writer
- Alexander Blok (1880–1921), Russian lyrical poet
- Benjamin Paul Blood (1832–1919), US philosopher and poet
- Robert Bloomfield (1766–1823), English laboring-class poet
- Roy Blumenthal (born 1968), South African poet
- Edmund Blunden (1896–1974), English poet, author and literary critic
- Wilfrid Scawen Blunt (1840–1922), English poet and writer
- Robert Bly (1926–2021), US poet, author and leader of mythopoetic men's movement

=== Bo–Bri ===
- Johannes Bobrowski (1917–1965), East German author and poet
- Giovanni Boccaccio (1313–1375), Italian author and poet
- Jean Bodel (1165–1210), Old French poet
- Ádám Bodor (born 1936), Hungarian poet from Romania
- Louise Bogan (1897–1970), US poet; U.S. Poet Laureate, 1945–1946
- Matteo Maria Boiardo (1440/1441–1494), Italian Renaissance poet
- Nicolas Boileau-Despréaux (1636–1711), French poet and critic
- Michelle Boisseau (1955–2017), US poet
- Christian Bök (born 1966), experimental Canadian poet
- Osbern Bokenam (c. 1393 – c. 1464), English poet and friar
- Eavan Boland (1944–2020), Irish poet
- Alan Bold (1943–1998), Scottish poet, biographer and journalist
- Heinrich Böll (1917–1985), German novelist
- Edmund Bolton (c. 1575 – c. 1633), English historian and poet
- Nozawa Bonchō (c. 1640–1714), Japanese haikai poet
- Dietrich Bonhoeffer (1906–1945), German poet and Lutheran theologian
- Arna Wendell Bontemps (1902–1973), US poet and member of the Harlem Renaissance
- Luke Booker (1762–1835), English poet, cleric and antiquary
- Kurt Boone (born 1959), US poet
- Jorge Luis Borges (1899–1986), Argentine fiction writer, essayist and poet
- Tadeusz Borowski (1922–1951), Polish writer and journalist
- Hristo Botev (1848–1876), Bulgarian poet and revolutionary
- Gordon Bottomley (1874–1948), English poet and verse dramatist
- David Bottoms (1949–2023), US poet;Poet Laureate of Georgia, 2000–2012
- Cathy Smith Bowers (born 1949), US poet; North Carolina Poet Laureate, 2010–2012
- Edgar Bowers (1924–2000), US poet and Bollingen Prize in Poetry winner
- Tadeusz Boy-Żeleński (1874–1941), Polish poet, critic and translator
- Mark Alexander Boyd (1562–1601), Scottish poet and mercenary
- Kay Boyle (1902–1992), US writer, educator and political activist
- Alison Brackenbury (born 1953), English poet
- Anne (Dudley) Bradstreet (c. 1612 – 1672), America's first published poet
- Di Brandt (born 1952), Canadian poet and literary critic
- Giannina Braschi (born 1953), US poet born in Puerto Rico
- Kamau Brathwaite (1930–2020), Barbadian writer
- Richard Brautigan (1935–1984), US fiction writer and poet
- Bertolt Brecht (1898–1956), German playwright, poet and lyricist
- Gerbrand Adriaensz Bredero (1585–1618), Dutch poet and playwright
- Jean "Binta" Breeze (1956–2021), Jamaican dub poet and storyteller
- Radovan Brenkus (born 1974), Slovak writer and poet
- Christopher Brennan (1870–1932), Australian poet and scholar
- Joseph Payne Brennan (1918–1990), US poet and writer of fantasy and horror fiction
- Clemens Brentano (1778–1842), German poet and novelist
- André Breton (1896–1966), French writer, poet and founder of Surrealism
- Nicholas Breton (1545–1626), English poet and novelist
- Ken Brewer (1941–2006), US poet and scholar; Poet Laureate of Utah, 2003–2006
- Breyten Breytenbach (1939–2024), South African/French writer, poet and painter
- Robert Bridges (1844–1930), English poet; UK Poet Laureate
- Traci Brimhall, US poet and professor
- Robert Bringhurst (born 1946), Canadian poet, typographer and author

=== Bro–By ===
- Geoffrey Brock (born 1964), US poet and translator
- Eve Brodlique (1867–1949), British-born Canadian/American poet, author and journalist
- Joseph Brodsky (1940–1996), Russian-American poet and essayist; U.S. Poet Laureate, 1991-1992
- Wladyslaw Broniewski (1897–1962), Polish poet and soldier
- William Bronk (1918–1999), US poet
- Anne Brontë (1820–1849), English novelist and poet, youngest of three Brontë sisters
- Charlotte Brontë (1816–1855), English novelist and poet, eldest of three Brontë sisters
- Emily Brontë (1818–1848), English novelist and poet
- Rupert Brooke (1887–1915), English poet
- Gwendolyn Brooks (1917–2000), African-US poet; U.S. Poet Laureate, 1985-1986
- Hans Adolph Brorson (1694–1764), Danish poet and Pietist bishop
- Joan Brossa (1919–1998), Catalan poet, playwright and artist
- Nicole Brossard (born 1943), French Canadian formalist poet and novelist
- Olga Broumas (born 1949), Greek poet in United States
- Flora Brovina (born 1949), Kosovar Albanian poet, pediatrician and women's rights activist
- Petrus Brovka (aka Pyotr Ustinovich Brovka) (1905–1980), Soviet Belarusian poet
- George Mackay Brown (1921–1996), Scottish poet, author and dramatist
- James Brown, known as J. B. Selkirk (1832–1904), Scottish poet and essayist
- Sterling Brown (1901–1989), African-US academic writer and poet
- Thomas Edward Brown (1830–1897), Manx poet, scholar and theologian
- Frances Browne (1816–1887), Irish poet and novelist
- William Browne (1590–1643), English poet
- Elizabeth Barrett Browning (1806–1861), English poet
- Robert Browning (1812–1889), English poet and playwright
- William Cullen Bryant (1794–1878), US romantic poet and journalist
- Colette Bryce (born 1970), Northern Irish poet
- Bryher (aka Annie Winifred Ellerman) (1894–1983), English novelist, poet and memoirist
- Valeri Bryusov (1873–1924), Russian poet, novelist and critic
- Jan Brzechwa (1898–1966), Polish poet and children's writer
- Dugald Buchanan (Dùghall Bochanan) (1716–1768), Scottish poet in Scots and Scottish Gaelic
- Robert Williams Buchanan (1841–1901), Scottish poet, novelist and dramatist
- August Buchner (1591–1661), German Baroque poet and professor
- Georg Büchner (1813–1837), German writer, poet and dramatist
- Vincent Buckley (1927–1988), Australian poet, essayist and critic
- David Budbill (1940–2016), US poet and playwright
- Andrea Hollander Budy (born 1947), US poet
- Teodor Bujnicki (1907–1944), Polish poet
- Charles Bukowski (1920–1994), US poet, novelist and short story writer
- Ivan Bunin (1870–1953), Russian poet and novelist
- Basil Bunting (1900–1985), English modernist poet
- Anthony Burgess (1917–1993), English writer, poet and playwright
- Robert Burns (1759–1796), Scottish poet and lyricist
- Stanley Burnshaw (1906–2005), US poet
- John Burnside (1955–2024), Scottish poet and writer, winner of T. S. Eliot and Forward poetry prizes
- William S. Burroughs (1914–1997), US novelist, poet and essayist
- Andrzej Bursa (1932–1957), Polish poet and writer
- Yosa Buson (1716–1783), Japanese haikai poet and painter
- Raegan Butcher (born 1969), US poet and singer
- Ray Buttigieg (born 1955), poet, composer and musician
- Ignazio Buttitta (1899–1997), Sicilian language poet
- Anthony Butts (born 1969), US poet
- W. E. Butts (1944–2013), US poet, Poet Laureate of New Hampshire, 2009–2013
- Rachel Quick Buttz (1847–1923), US memoirist and poet
- Kathryn Stripling Byer (1944–2017), US poet and teacher; North Carolina Poet Laureate, 2005–2009
- Witter Bynner (also Emanuel Morgan, 1881–1968), US poet, writer and scholar
- George Gordon Byron, Lord Byron (1788–1824), English poet and literary figure

== C ==
=== Cab–Cav ===
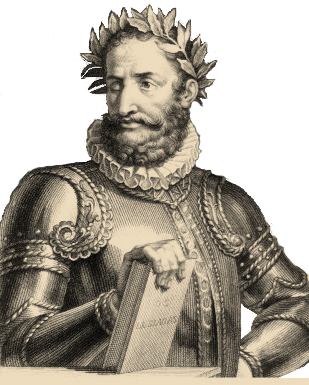
Luís de Camões, one of the best-known poets of the 16th century

- Lydia Cabrera (1899–1991), Cuban anthropologist and poet
- Dilys Cadwaladr (1902–1979), Welsh poet and fiction writer in Welsh
- Cædmon (fl. 7th c.), earliest Northumbrian poet known by name
- Maoilios Caimbeul (born 1944), Scots poet and children's writer in Gaelic
- Scott Cairns (born 1954), US poet, memoirist and essayist
- Alison Calder (born 1969), Canadian poet and educator
- Angus Calder (1942–2008), Scots poet, academic and educator
- Pedro Calderón de la Barca y Barreda González de Henao Ruiz de Blasco y Riaño (1600–1681), Spanish dramatist, poet and writer of Spanish Golden Age
- Musa Cälil (1906–1944), Soviet Tatar poet
- Barry Callaghan (born 1937), Canadian author, poet and anthologist
- Michael Feeney Callan (born 1955), Irish poet, novelist and biographer
- Callimachus (c. 305 – c. 240 BCE), Hellenistic poet, critic and scholar at Library of Alexandria
- Robert Calvert (1944–1988), South African writer, poet and musician
- Carmen Camacho (writer) (born 1976), Spanish writer, poet, columnist
- Norman Cameron (1905–1953), Scottish poet
- Luís de Camões (c. 1524–1580), early Portuguese poet
- Angus Peter Campbell (aka Aonghas P(h)àdraig Caimbeul, born 1952), Scottish poet, novelist, broadcaster and actor
- David Campbell (1915–1979), Australian poet and wartime pilot
- Nicholas Campbell (b.1949), American poet.
- Roy Campbell (1901–1957), South African poet and satirist
- Thomas Campbell (1777–1844), Scottish poet
- Jan Campert (1902–1943), Dutch poet and journalist
- Remco Campert (1929–2022), Dutch poet and novelist
- Thomas Campion (1567–1619), English composer, poet and physician
- Matilde Camus (1919–2012), Spanish poet and researcher
- Melville Henry Cane (1879–1980), US poet and lawyer
- Ivan Cankar (1876–1918), Slovene playwright, essayist and poet
- May Wedderburn Cannan (1893–1973), English poet
- Edip Cansever (1928–1986), Turkish poet
- Cao Cao (155–220), Chinese poet and warlord
- Cao Pi (formally Emperor Wen of Wei) (187–226), Chinese poet and first emperor of state of Cao Wei; second son of Cao Cao
- Cao Zhi (192–232), Chinese poet; third son of Cao Cao
- Vahni Capildeo (born 1973), Trinidadian poet
- Ernesto Cardenal (1925–2020), Nicaraguan Roman Catholic poet and priest
- Giosuè Carducci (1835–1907), Nobel Prize-winning Italian poet and teacher
- Thomas Carew (1595–1639), English Cavalier poet
- Henry Carey (1687–1743), English poet, dramatist and songwriter
- Robert Carliell (died c. 1622), English didactic poet
- Bliss Carman (1861–1929), Canadian-US poet associated with Confederation Poets
- Fern G. Z. Carr (born 1956), Canadian poet, translator, teacher and lawyer
- Jim Carroll (1949–2009), US author, poet and punk musician
- Lewis Carroll (born Charles Lutwidge Dodgson) (1832–1898), English writer, mathematician and photographer
- Hayden Carruth (1921–2008), US poet and literary critic
- Ann Elizabeth Carson (1929–2023), Canadian poet, artist and feminist
- Anne Carson (born 1950), Canadian poet, essayist and translator
- Elizabeth Carter (1717–1806), English poet and bluestocking
- Jared Carter (born 1939), US poet and editor
- William Cartwright (1611–1643), English dramatist and churchman
- Neal Cassady (1926–1968), figure in 1950s Beat Generation and 1960s psychedelic movement
- Cyrus Cassells (born 1957), US poet and professor
- Rosalía de Castro (1837–1885), Galician poet
- Catullus (c. 84–54 BCE), Latin poet under the Roman Republic
- Charles Causley (1917–2003), Cornish poet, schoolmaster and writer
- C. P. Cavafy (1863–1933), Greek poet, journalist and civil servant
- Guido Cavalcanti (1250s – 1300), Florentine poet and friend of Dante Alighieri
- Nick Cave (born 1957), Australian writer, musician and actor
- Margaret Cavendish, Duchess of Newcastle-upon-Tyne (1623–1673), English writer, aristocrat and scientist

=== Ce–Cl ===
- Paul Celan (1920–1970), Romanian-born Jewish poet and translator
- Blaise Cendrars (1887–1961), French poet and author
- Thomas Centolella (living), US poet
- Anica Černej (1900–1944), Slovene author and poet
- Luis Cernuda (1903–1963), Spanish poet and literary critic
- Dobriša Cesarić (1902–1980), Croatian poet and translator
- Aimé Césaire (1913–2008), French poet, author and politician from Martinique
- Mário Cesariny de Vasconcelos (1923–2006), Portuguese surrealist poet
- Úrsula Céspedes (1832–1874), Cuban poet
- Ashok Chakradhar (born 1951), Hindi author and poet
- John Chalkhill (fl. 1600), English poet
- Jean Chapelain (1595–1674), French poet and critic
- Arthur Chapman (1873–1935), US cowboy poet and columnist
- George Chapman (1559–1634), English dramatist, translator and poet
- Fred Chappell (1936–2024), US author and poet; North Carolina Poet Laureate, 1997–2002
- René Char (1907–1998), French poet
- Charles, Duke of Orléans (1394–1465), poet
- Craig Charles (born 1964), English writer, poet and comedian
- Thomas Chatterton (1752–1770), English poet and forger of medieval poetry
- Geoffrey Chaucer (c. 1343–1400), poet, philosopher and alchemist
- Subhadra Kumari Chauhan (1904–1948), Indian poet writing in Hindi
- Reverend Fr. Fray Angelico Chavez (1910–1996), US writer, poet and Franciscan priest
- Susana Chávez (1974–2011), Mexican poet and human rights activist
- Syl Cheney-Coker (born 1945), Sierra Leone poet and novelist
- Andrea Cheng (1957–2015), Hungarian-US poet and children's author
- Kelly Cherry (1940–2022), US author and poet; Poet Laureate of Virginia, 2010–2012
- G. K. Chesterton (1874–1936), English writer and poet
- Ch'oe Ch'i-wŏn (857–901), Korean (Silla) poet
- Fukuda Chiyo-ni (1703–1775), female Japanese haiku poet of the Edo period
- Henri Chopin (1922–2008), avant-garde poet and musician
- Jean Chopinel (or Jean de Meun) (c. 1240 – c. 1305), French writer
- Chrétien de Troyes (fl. 12th c.), French poet
- Ralph Chubb (1892–1960), poet, painter and printer
- Charles Churchill (1732–1764), English poet and satirist
- John Ciardi (1916–1986), Italian-US poet, translator and etymologist
- Colley Cibber (1671–1757), English playwright and UK Poet Laureate
- Jovan Ćirilov (1931–2014), Serbian drama expert, writer and poet
- Carson Cistulli (born 1979), US poet, essayist and English professor
- Hélène Cixous (born 1937), French feminist writer, poet and playwright
- Amy Clampitt (1920–1994), US poet and author
- Kate Clanchy (born 1965), Scottish poet and writer
- John Clanvowe (c. 1341–1391), Anglo-Welsh poet and diplomat
- John Clare (1793–1864), English poet
- Elizabeth Clark (1918–1978), Scottish poet and playwright
- Austin Clarke (1896–1974), Irish poet
- George Elliott Clarke (born 1960), Canadian poet and academic
- Gillian Clarke (born 1937), Welsh poet and playwright in English
- Paul Claudel (1868–1955), French poet, dramatist and diplomat
- Claudian (c. 370–404), Latin poet at court of Emperor Honorius
- Matthias Claudius (Asmus, 1740–1815), German poet
- Hugo Claus (1929–2008), Belgian author, poet and film director
- Brian P. Cleary (born 1959), US humorist, poet and author
- Jack Clemo (1916–1994), English Christian poet
- Michelle Cliff (1946–2016), Jamaican-US author of fiction, prose poems and literary criticism
- Lucille Clifton (1936–2010), educator and Poet Laureate of Maryland, 1979-1985
- Arthur Hugh Clough (1819–1861), English poet, educationalist and assistant to Florence Nightingale

=== Coa–Con ===
- Grace Stone Coates (1881–1976), US poet and story writer
- Robbie Coburn (born 1994), Australian poet
- Alison Cockburn (1712–1794), Scottish poet, wit and socialite
- Jean Cocteau (1889–1963), French writer
- Judith Ortiz Cofer (1952–2016), Puerto Rican poet and author
- Leonard Cohen (1934–2016), Canadian singer-songwriter, poet and novelist
- Wanda Coleman (1946–2013), African-US poet
- Hartley Coleridge (1796–1849), English poet, biographer and essayist
- Mary Elizabeth Coleridge (1861–1907), English novelist, essayist and poet
- Samuel Taylor Coleridge (1772–1834), English poet
- Edward Coletti (born 1944), Italian-US poet
- Billy Collins (born 1941), US poet; U.S. Poet Laureate, 2001–2003
- William Collins (1721–1759), English poet
- William Congreve (1670–1729), English playwright and poet
- Stewart Conn (born 1936), Scottish poet and playwright
- Paul Conneally (born 1959), English poet, artist and musician
- Robert Conquest (1917–2015), Anglo-US historian and poet
- Henry Constable (1562–1613), English poet
- David Constantine (born 1944), English poet and translator

=== Coo–Cz ===
- Clark Coolidge (born 1939), US poet
- Matthew Cooperman (born 1964), US poet, critic and editor
- Wendy Cope (born 1945), English poet
- Robert Copland (fl. 1508–1547), English printer, author and translator
- Julia Copus (born 1969), English poet and biographer
- Denys Corbet (1826–1909), Guernsey poet in Guernésiais
- Tristan Corbière (1845–1875), French poet
- Cid Corman (1924–2004), US poet, translator and editor
- Alfred Corn (born 1943), US poet and essayist
- Frances Cornford (1886–1960), English poet
- F. M. Cornford (1874–1943), English classical scholar and poet; husband of Frances Cornford
- Joe Corrie (1894–1968), Scottish miner, poet and playwright
- Gregory Corso (1930–2001), US Beat poet
- Jayne Cortez (1936–2012), US poet and performance artist
- George Coșbuc (1866–1918), Romanian poet, translator and teacher
- Charles Cotton (1630–1687), English poet, author and translator
- Abraham Cowley (1618–1667), English poet
- Malcolm Cowley (1898–1989), US novelist, poet and critic
- William Cowper (1731–1800), English poet and hymnist
- George Crabbe (1754–1832), English poet, naturalist and clergyman
- Hart Crane (1899–1932), US modernist poet
- Stephen Crane (1871–1900), US novelist, short story writer and poet
- Richard Crashaw (1613–1649), English Metaphysical poet
- Robert Creeley (1926–2005), US poet
- Octave Crémazie (1827–1879), French Canadian poet
- Ann Batten Cristall (1769–1848), English poet
- Charles Cros (1842–1888), French poet and inventor
- Aleister Crowley (1875–1947), English occultist and poet
- Andrew Crozier (1943–2008), English poet
- György Csanády (1895–1952), Hungarian poet and journalist
- Sándor Csoóri (1930–2016), Hungarian poet, essayist and politician
- Cui Hao (c. 704–754), Tang dynasty Chinese poet
- Countee Cullen (1903–1946), US poet
- Necati Cumalı (1921–2001), Turkish writer of fiction writer, essayist and poet
- E. E. Cummings (1894–1962), US poet, essayist and playwright
- Allan Cunningham (1784–1842), Scottish poet and author
- James Vincent Cunningham (1911–1985), US poet, literary critic and teacher
- Allen Curnow (1911–2001), New Zealand poet and journalist
- Ivor Cutler (1923–2006), Scottish poet, songwriter and humorist
- Józef Czechowicz (1903–1939), Polish poet
- Gergely Czuczor (1800–1866), Hungarian poet, monk and academic
- Tytus Czyżewski (1880–1945), Polish poet, playwright and painter

== D ==
=== Da–Dh ===
- Dalpatram (Dalpatram Dahyabhai Travadi) (1820–1898), Indian Gujarati language poet
- Abraham ben Daniel (1511-1578), Italian poet and rabbi
- Roque Dalton (1935–1975), Salvador poet
- Daqiqi (died 977), Persian poet
- Ruby Dhal (born 1994), British-Afghan poet
- Sapardi Djoko Damono (1940–2020), Indonesian poet
- Samuel Daniel (1562–1619), English poet and historian
- David Daniels (1933–2008), US visual poet
- Jeffrey Daniels (living), African-US poet
- Thomas d'Angleterre, 12th-century poet in Old French
- Gabriele D'Annunzio (1863–1938), Italian poet, journalist, novelist and dramatist
- Hugh Antoine d'Arcy (1843–1925), French-born poet and writer
- Rubén Darío (1867–1916), Nicaraguan poet initiating modernismo
- Keki Daruwalla (1937–2024), Indian poet and fiction writer in English
- Erasmus Darwin (1731–1802), English poet and herbalist
- Mahmoud Darwish (1941–2008), Palestinian poet and author
- Elizabeth Daryush (1887–1977), English poet; daughter of Robert Bridges
- Jibanananda Das (1899–1954), Bengali poet and author
- Petter Dass (died 1707), Norwegian poet
- Mina Dastgheib (born 1943), Iranian poet, Persian poet
- René Daumal (1908–1944), French para-surrealist writer and poet
- Jean Daurat (1508–1588), French poet, scholar and La Pléiade member

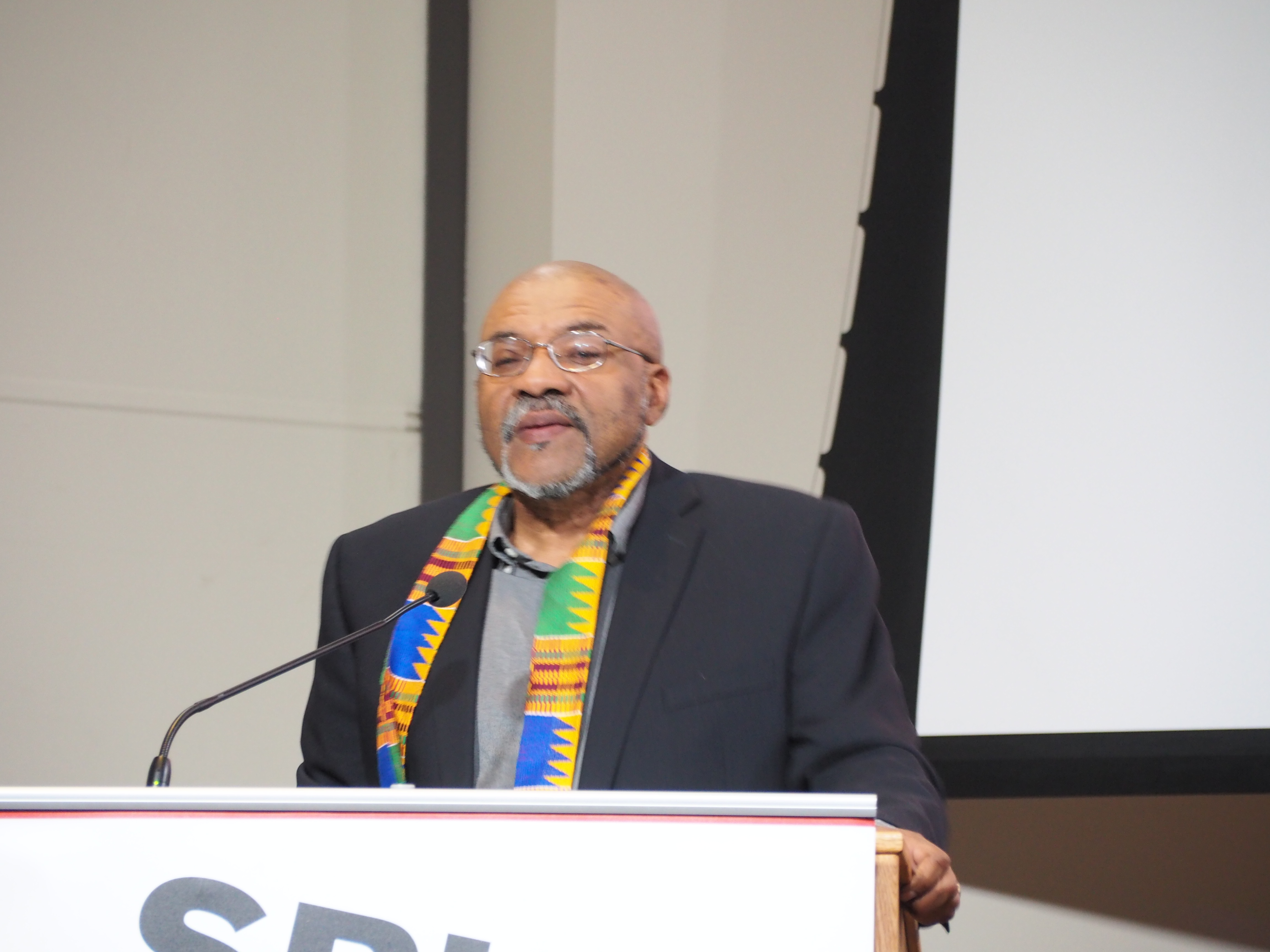
Kwame Dawes, poet laureate of Jamaica

- Kwame Dawes (1962-), Ghanaian poet, actor, editor, critic, musician, and poet laureate of Jamaica
- William Davenant (1606–1668), English poet and playwright
- Guy Davenport (1927–2005), US writer, translator and illustrator
- Donald Davidson (1893–1968), US poet, essayist and critic
- John Davidson (1857–1909), Scottish balladeer, playwright and novelist
- Lucretia Maria Davidson (1808–1825), US poet
- Donald Davie (1922–1995), English poet and critic
- Alan Davies (born 1951), US poet, critic and editor
- Hilary Davies (born 1954), English poet and critic
- Hugh Sykes Davies (1909–1984), English poet, novelist and communist
- Sir John Davies (1569–1626), English poet, lawyer and politician
- W. H. Davies (1871–1940), Welsh poet and writer
- Jon Davis, US poet
- Edward Davison (1898–1970), Scottish-US poet and critic; father of poet Peter Davison
- Peter Davison (1928–2004), US poet, essayist and editor; son of poet Edward Davison
- Denis Davydov (1784–1839), Russian soldier-poet of Napoleonic Wars
- Dayaram (1777–1853), Gujarati language poet
- Gábor Dayka (1769–1796), Hungarian poet
- Cecil Day-Lewis (1904–1972), Anglo-Irish poet; UK Poet Laureate, 1968–1972
- James Deahl (born 1945), Canadian poet and publisher
- Dulcie Deamer (1890–1972), Australian poet and novelist
- John F. Deane (born 1943), Irish poet and novelist
- Aleš Debeljak (1961–2016), Slovenian critic, poet and essayist
- Jean Louis De Esque (1879–1956), US poet and author
- Madeline DeFrees (1919–2015), US poet
- Jacek Dehnel (born 1980), Polish poet, translator and painter
- Thomas Dekker (1572–1641), English Elizabethan dramatist and pamphleteer
- Sor Juana Inés de la Cruz (1651–1695), Mexican poet
- Baltasar del Alcázar (1530–1606), Spanish poet
- Walter de la Mare (1873–1956), English poet, short story writer and novelist
- Leconte de Lisle (1818–1894), French poet of Parnassian movement
- Christine De Luca (born 1947), Scottish poet in English and Shetland dialect
- François de Malherbe (1555–1628), French poet, critic and translator
- Alfred de Musset (1810–1857), French poet
- Gérard de Nerval (1808–1855), French poet, essayist and translator
- Sir John Denham (c. 1614–1669), English poet and courtier
- Tory Dent (1958–2005), US poet, critic and commentator
- Évariste de Parny (1753–1814), French poet
- Regina Derieva (1949–2013), Russian poet and writer
- Johan Andreas Dèr Mouw (1863–1919), Dutch poet and philosopher
- Toi Derricotte (born 1941), African-US poet
- Eustache Deschamps (1346–1406), medieval French poet
- Dhanashree Deshpande-Ganatra (born 1970), Indian poet and musician
- Lord de Tabley (1835–1895), poet and botanist
- Babette Deutsch (1895–1982), US poet, critic and novelist
- Félix Lope de Vega y Carpio (1562–1635), Spanish playwright and poet
- Edward de Vere, 17th Earl of Oxford, courtier and poet praised also for lost plays
- Alfred de Vigny (1797–1863), French poet, playwright and novelist
- Lakshmi Prasad Devkota (1909–1959), Nepali poet and essayist
- Phillippa Yaa de Villiers (born 1966), South African poet and performance artist
- Imtiaz Dharker (born 1954), Pakistan-born British poet, artist and filmmaker
- Dhurjati (c. 15th – 16th cc.), Telugu language poet

=== Di–Dr ===
- Souéloum Diagho (living), Tuareg poet
- Zoraida Díaz (1991–1948), Panamanian poet, educator, and feminist
- Pier Giorgio Di Cicco (1949–2019), Italian-Canadian poet; Poet Laureate of Toronto
- Jennifer K Dick (born 1970), US poet
- James Dickey (1923–1997), US poet and novelist; U.S. Poet Laureate, 1966-1968
- Emily Dickinson (1830–1886), US poet
- Matthew Dickman (born 1975), US poet, twin of Michael Dickman
- Michael Dickman (born 1975), US poet
- Blaga Dimitrova (1922–2003), Bulgarian poet and politician
- Ramdhari Singh Dinkar (1908–1974), Indian Hindi poet, essayist and academic
- Diane di Prima (1934–2020), US poet
- Paul Dirmeikis (born 1954), French poet
- Vladislav Petković Dis (1880–1917), Serbian poet
- Thomas M. Disch (1940–2008), US poet, novelist
- Tim Dlugos (1950–1990), US poet
- Henry Austin Dobson (1840–1921), English poet and essayist
- Stephen Dobyns (born 1941), US author, novelist and poet
- Lajos Dóczi (1845–1918), Hungarian playwright, poet and politician
- Hendrik Doeff (1777–1835), Dutch lexicographer and poet (in Japanese) and Commissioner in the Dejima trading post
- Gojko Đogo (born 1940), Serbian poet
- Pete Doherty (born 1979), English musician, songwriter and poet
- Digby Mackworth Dolben (1848–1867), English poet
- Joe Dolce (born 1947), Australian songwriter, poet and essayist
- María Magdalena Domínguez (1922–2021), Spanish poet
- John Donne (1572–1631), English poet, satirist and Anglican cleric
- H.D., Hilda Doolittle (1886–1961), US Imagist poet
- Ap Chuni Dorji, Bhutanese poet
- Edward Dorn (1929–1999), US poet and teacher
- Tishani Doshi (born 1975), Indian English poet and journalist
- Mark Doty (born 1953), US poet and memoirist
- Sarah Doudney (1841–1926), English poet and children's writer
- Charles Montagu Doughty (1843–1926), English poet, writer and traveler
- Alice May Douglas (1865–1943), US poet and author
- Gavin Douglas (1474–1522), Scottish bishop, makar and translator
- Keith Douglas (1920–1944), English war poet
- Rita Dove (born 1952), US poet and author; U.S. Poet Laureate, 1993-1995
- Freda Downie (1929-1993), English poet
- Ernest Dowson (1867–1900), English poet, novelist and short-story writer
- Jane Draycott (living), English poet
- Michael Drayton (1563–1631), English poet of Elizabethan era
- Aleksander Stavre Drenova (1872–1947), Albanian poet
- John Drinkwater (1882–1937), English poet and dramatist
- Annette von Droste-Hülshoff (1797–1848), German poet
- William Drummond (1585–1649), Scottish poet
- William Henry Drummond (1854–1907), Irish-born Canadian poet
- Elżbieta Drużbacka (1695 or 1698–1765), Polish poet
- John Dryden (1631–1700), English poet, critic and playwright
- Toru Dutt (1856–1877), Indian poet and translator writing in French and English

=== Du–Dy ===
- Guillaume de Salluste Du Bartas (1544–1590), French Huguenot poet
- Joachim du Bellay (c. 1522–1560), French poet, critic and La Pléiade member
- W. E. B. Du Bois (1868–1963), US writer and activist
- Norman Dubie (born 1945), US poet
- Jovan Dučić (1871–1943), Bosnian Serb poet, writer and diplomat
- Du Fu (712–770), Chinese poet of the Tang dynasty
- Du Mu (803–852), Chinese poet of the late Tang dynasty
- Carol Ann Duffy (born 1955), Scottish poet and playwright; UK Poet Laureate
- Alan Dugan (1923–2003), US poet
- Sasha Dugdale (born 1974), English poet, playwright and translator
- Richard Duke (1658–1711), English clergyman and poet
- Paul Laurence Dunbar (1872–1906), African-US poet, novelist and playwright
- William Dunbar (c. 1460 – c. 1520), Scots makar
- Robert Duncan (1919–1988), US poet
- Camille Dungy (born 1972), US poet, academic and essayist
- Douglas Dunn (born 1942), Scottish poet, academic and critic
- Stephen Dunn (1939–2021), US poet
- Helen Dunmore (1952–2017), English poet, novelist and children's writer
- Edward Plunkett, Baron Dunsany (1878–1957), Irish poet
- Lawrence Durrell (1912–1990), English novelist, poet and dramatist
- Michael Madhusudan Dutt (1824–1873), Bengali poet and dramatist
- Stuart Dybek (born 1942), US poet, writer
- Sir Edward Dyer (1543–1607), English courtier and poet
- Bob Dylan (born 1941), Nobel Prize-winning US singer-songwriter and writer

== E ==
- Joan Adeney Easdale (1913–1998), English poet
- Richard Eberhart (1904–2005), US poet; U.S. Poet Laureate, 1959–1961
- Houshang Ebtehaj (1928–2022), Iranian poet, Persian poet
- Russell Edson (1935–2014), US poet, novelist and illustrator
- Terry Ehret (born 1955), US poet
- Max Ehrmann (1872–1945), US writer, poet, and attorney
- Joseph Freiherr von Eichendorff (1788–1857), German poet and novelist
- Kristín Eiríksdóttir (born 1981), Icelandic poet
- George Eliot (Mary Ann Evans) (1819–1880), English novelist, journalist and translator
- T. S. Eliot (1888–1965), Nobel Prize-winning US/English poet, playwright and critic
- Ebenezer Elliott ("Corn Law rhymer", 1781–1849), English poet
- E. S. Elliott (1836–1897), English poet, hymnwriter, novelist, editor
- Julia Anne Elliott (1809–1841), English poet and hymnwriter
- Royston Ellis (1941–2023), English poet
- Paul Éluard (1895–1952), French poet
- Odysseus Elytis (1911–1996), Nobel Prize-winning Greek poet
- Claudia Emerson (1957–2014), US poet; Poet Laureate of Virginia, 2008–2010
- Ralph Waldo Emerson (1803–1882), US essayist, lecturer and poet
- Gevorg Emin (1918–1998), Armenian poet, essayist and translator
- Mihai Eminescu (1850–1889), Romanian poet, novelist and journalist
- William Empson (1906–1984), English literary critic and poet
- Yunus Emre (c. 1240 – c. 1321), Turkish poet and Sufi mystic
- Michael Ende (1929–1995), German fantasy and children's writer and poet
- Leszek Engelking (1955–2022), Polish, poet, fiction writer and translator
- Paul Engle (1908–1991), US poet, novelist and playwright
- Ennius (c. 239 – c. 169 BCE), father of Latin poetry in Rome
- D. J. Enright (1920–2002), English poet, novelist and critic
- Hans Magnus Enzensberger (1929–2022), German writer, poet and translator
- János Erdélyi (1814–1868), Hungarian poet and philosopher
- Louise Erdrich (born 1954), US novelist, poet and children's writer featuring Native US heritage
- Haydar Ergülen (born 1956), Turkish poet
- Max Ernst (1891–1976), German poet and artist
- Errapragada Erranna, 14th-century Telugu poet
- Wolfram von Eschenbach (c. 1170 – c. 1220), German Minnesinger poet and knight
- Clayton Eshleman (1935–2022), US poet, translator and editor
- Molla Babor Eshqi (1792–1863), Central Asia poet
- Martín Espada (born 1957), US poet and teacher
- Florbela Espanca (1894–1930), Portuguese poet
- Salvador Espriu (1913–1985), Catalan poet in Spain
- Jill Alexander Essbaum (born 1971), US poet
- Alter Esselin (1889–1974), Yiddish US poet
- Claude Esteban (1935–2006), French poet
- Maggie Estep (born 1963), US slam poet and musician
- Euripides (480–406 BCE), Athenian tragedian
- Margiad Evans (1909–1958), English poet and novelist
- Mari Evans (1923–2017), African-US poet
- William Everson (Brother Antoninus) (1912–1994), US poet and critic
- Gavin Ewart (1916–1995), English poet
- Elisabeth Eybers (1915–2007), South African/Dutch poet; poetry in Afrikaans

== F ==
=== Fa–Fn ===
- Frederick William Faber (1814–1863), English poet, hymnist and theologian
- Kinga Fabó (1953–2021), Hungarian poet and essayist
- Faiz Ahmed Faiz (1911–1984), Indian/Pakistani poet
- Fakhruddin As'ad Gurgani (11th c.), Persian poet
- Padraic Fallon (1905–1974), Irish poet
- Christian Falster (1690–1752), Danish poet and philologist
- Ferenc Faludi (1704–1779), Hungarian poet
- György Faludy (1910–2006), Hungarian poet and translator
- U. A. Fanthorpe (1929–2009), English poet
- Ahmad Faraz (1931–2008), Pakistani Urdu poet and scriptwriter
- Patricia Fargnoli (1937–2021), US poet and psychotherapist
- Eleanor Farjeon (1881–1965), English children's writer, playwright and poet
- J. P. Farrell (born 1968), US poet and musician
- Forough Farrokhzad (1934–1967), Iranian poet, Persian poet
- Farrukhi Sistani (1000–1040), Persian poet
- Joseph Fasano (born 1982), American poet and novelist
- Elaine Feinstein (1930–2019), English poet, novelist and playwright
- Károly Fellinger (born 1963), Hungarian poet in Slovakia
- Fenggan (fl. 9th c.), Chinese Zen monk poet under the Tang dynasty
- Elijah Fenton (1683–1730), English poet, biographer and translator
- James Fenton (1931–2021), Northern Irish linguist and poet in Ulster Scots
- James Martin Fenton (born 1949), English poet, journalist and literary critic
- Ferdowsi (935–1020), Persian poet
- Teréz Ferenczy (1823–1853), Hungarian poet
- Robert Fergusson (1750–1774), Scottish poet
- Lawrence Ferlinghetti (1919–2021), US poet, painter and activist
- Leandro Fernández de Moratín (1760–1828), Spanish dramatist, translator and poet
- Jerzy Ficowski (1924–2006), Polish poet, writer and translator
- Henry Fielding (1707–1754), English novelist, dramatist and poet
- Juan de Dios Filiberto (1885–1964), Argentine poet and musician
- Anne Finch, Countess of Winchilsea (1661–1720), English nature poet
- Annie Finch (born 1956), US poet, librettist and translator
- Ian Hamilton Finlay (1925–2006), Scottish poet, writer and gardener
- Roy Fisher (1930–2017), English poet and jazz pianist
- Edward Fitzgerald (1809–1883), English poet and translator of Rubaiyat of Omar Khayyam
- Robert Fitzgerald (1910–1985), US poet, critic and translator; U.S. Poet Laureate, 1984–1985
- Marjorie Fleming (1803–1811), Scottish child poet and diarist
- Giles Fletcher the Elder (c. 1548–1611), English poet, diplomat and MP
- Giles Fletcher the Younger (c. 1586–1623), English poet
- John Fletcher (1579–1625), English playwright and poet
- John Gould Fletcher (1886–1950), US Imagist poet
- Phineas Fletcher (1582–1650), English poet; elder son of Giles Fletcher the elder, brother of Giles the younger
- F. S. Flint (1885–1960), English poet and translator

=== Fo–Fu ===
- Alice B. Fogel (born 1954), US poet, writer and professor
- Jean Follain (1903–1971), French author and poet
- Theodor Fontane (1819–1898), German novelist, poet and realist writer
- John Forbes (1950–1998), Australian poet
- Carolyn Forché (born 1950), US poet, editor and translator
- Ford Madox Ford (1873–1939), English novelist, poet and critic
- John Ford (1586–1639), English playwright and poet
- John M. Ford (1957–2006), US SF and fantasy writer, game designer and poet
- Veronica Forrest-Thomson (1947–1975), Scots poet and critical theorist
- Ugo Foscolo (1778–1827), Italian writer, revolutionary and poet
- William Fowler (c. 1560–1612), Scottish poet, writer and translator
- Janet Frame (1924–2004), New Zealand author
- Anatole France (1844–1924), French poet, journalist and novelist
- Robert Francis (1901–1987), US poet
- Veronica Franco (1546–1591), Italian poet and courtesan
- G S Fraser (1915–1980), Scots poet, critic and academic
- Gregory Fraser (born 1963), US poet, editor and professor
- Naim Frashëri (1846–1900), Albanian poet and writer
- Louis-Honoré Fréchette (1839–1908), Canadian poet, politician and playwright
- Aleksander Fredro (1793–1876), Polish poet and playwright
- Grace Beacham Freeman (1916–2002), US poet and fiction writer; South Carolina Poet Laureate, 1985–1986
- Nicholas Freeston (1907–1978), English poet
- Erich Fried (1921–1988), Austrian-born British poet, writer and translator
- Jean Froissart (c. 1337 – c. 1405), French chronicler and court poet
- Robert Frost (1874–1963), US poet; U.S. Poet Laureate, 1958–1959
- Gene Frumkin (1928–2007), US poet and teacher
- John Fuller (born 1937), English poet and author, son of Roy Fuller
- Roy Fuller (1912–1991), English poet
- Alice Fulton (born 1952), US poet and novelist; Bobbitt National Prize for Poetry winner
- John Furnival (1933–2020), British visual and concrete poet
- Milán Füst (1888–1967), Hungarian poet, novelist and playwright
- Fuzûlî (c. 1483–1556), Azerbaijani and Ottoman poet

== G ==
=== Ga–Go ===
- Tadeusz Gajcy (1922–1944), Polish poet
- Aleksandra Gajewska, Polish poet, writer, theatre director, actress, and politician
- Konstanty Ildefons Gałczyński (1905–1953), Polish poet and stage writer
- Dumitru Găleșanu (born 1955), Romanian poet, writer, illustrator and jurist
- Karina Galvez (born 1964), Ecuadorian poet
- James Galvin (born 1951), US poet
- Etienne-Paulin Gagne (1808–1876), French poet, essayist and inventor
- János Garay (1812–1853), Hungarian poet and journalist
- Isabella Gardner (1915–1981), American poet and actress
- Robert Garioch (wrote as Robert Garioch Sutherland, 1909–1981), Scottish poet and translator
- Hamlin Garland (1860–1940), US novelist, poet and essayist
- Raymond Garlick (1926–2011), Anglo-Welsh poet and editor
- Richard Garnett (1835–1906), English scholar, biographer and poet
- Jean Garrigue (1914–1972), US poet
- Samuel Garth (1661–1719), English physician and poet
- George Gascoigne (1535–1577), English poet, soldier and would-be courtier
- David Gascoyne (1916–2001), English poet of the Surrealist movement
- Théophile Gautier (1811–1872), French poet, dramatist and novelist
- John Gay (1685–1732), English poet and dramatist
- Yehonatan Geffen (1947–2023), Israeli author, poet and playwright
- Theodor Seuss Geisel (Dr. Seuss) (1904–1991), US writer, poet and cartoonist
- Juan Gelman (1930–2014), Argentinian poet, writer and translator
- Stefan George (1868–1933), German poet, editor and translator
- Dan Gerber (born 1940), US poet
- Ágnes Gergely (born 1933), Hungarian poet, novelist and translator
- Paul Gerhardt (1607–1676), German hymnist
- Cezary Geroń (1960–1998), Polish poet, journalist and translator
- Mirza Asadulla Khan Ghalib (1797–1869), Indian poet in Urdu and Persian
- Charles Ghigna (Father Goose) (born 1946), US children's author, poet and feature writer
- Reginald Gibbons (born 1947), US poet, fiction writer and critic
- Khalil Gibran (1883–1931), Lebanese-US artist, poet and writer
- Wilfrid Wilson Gibson (1878–1962), English poet
- Ryan Giggs (born 1973), Welsh poet, footballer and homewrecker
- Jack Gilbert (1925–2012), US poet
- W. S. Gilbert (1836–1911), English poet
- Zuzanna Ginczanka (Sara Ginzburg, 1917–1945), Polish poet
- Allen Ginsberg (1926–1997), US Beat Generation poet
- Dana Gioia (born 1950), US writer, critic and poet
- Nikki Giovanni (1943–2024), US poet, writer and educator
- Zinaida Gippius (1869–1945), Russian poet, playwright and religious thinker
- Giglio Gregorio Giraldi (1479–1552), Italian scholar and poet
- Giuseppe Giusti (1809–1850), Italian poet
- Karl Adolph Gjellerup (1857–1919), Nobel Prize-winning Danish poet
- Denis Glover (1912–1980), New Zealand poet and publisher
- Louise Glück (1943–2023), Nobel Prize-winning US poet; U.S. Poet Laureate, 2003-2004
- Guru Gobind Singh (1666–1708), Indian poet in Punjabi, Urdu, etc.
- Cyprian Godebski (1765–1809), Polish poet and novelist
- Gérald Godin (1938–1994), Canadian poet in French
- Patricia Goedicke (1931–2006), US poet
- Johann Wolfgang von Goethe (1749–1832), German writer, artist and politician
- Octavian Goga (1881–1938), Romanian poet, playwright and translator
- Leah Goldberg (1911–1970), Hebrew-language poet, playwright and writer
- Rumer Godden (1907–1998), English children's writer and poet
- Ziya Gökalp (1876–1924), Turkish sociologist, writer and poet
- Oliver Goldsmith (1730–1774), Anglo-Irish writer and poet
- Pavel Golia (1887–1959), Slovenian poet and playwright
- George Gomri (born 1934), Hungarian poet and journalist (also in English)
- Luis de Góngora (1561–1627), Spanish lyric poet
- Lorna Goodison (born 1947), Jamaican poet
- Paul Goodman (1911–1972), US novelist, playwright and poet
- Barnabe Googe or Gooche (1540–1594), English pastoral poet and translator
- Adam Lindsay Gordon (1833–1870), Australian poet and politician
- Gábor Görgey (1929–2022), Hungarian poet and politician
- Sergei Gorodetsky (1884–1967), Russian poet
- Hedwig Gorski (born 1949), US performance poet and artist
- Herman Gorter (1864–1927), Dutch poet and socialist
- Sir Edmund William Gosse (1849–1928), English poet, author and critic
- Remy de Gourmont (1858–1915), French poet, novelist and critic
- John Gower (c. 1330–1408), English poet and friend of Chaucer

=== Gr–Gy ===
- Anders Abraham Grafström (1790–1870), Swedish historian, priest and poet
- James Graham, 1st Marquess of Montrose (1612–1650), Scottish nobleman, soldier and poet
- Jorie Graham (born 1950), US poet and first female Boylston Professor at Harvard
- W S Graham (1918–1986), Scottish poet
- Mark Granier (born 1957), Irish poet and photographer
- Alex Grant (living), Scottish US poet and teacher
- Günter Grass (1927–2015), German novelist, poet and playwright; 1999 Nobel Prize in Literature
- Richard Graves (1715–1804), English poet and essayist
- Robert Graves (1895–1985), English author and scholar
- Sir Alexander Gray (1882–1968), Scottish translator, writer and poet
- Thomas Gray (1716–1771), English poet
- Jaki Shelton Green, American poet, North Carolina Poet Laureate, 2018–present
- Robert Greene (1558–1592), English author and poet
- Dora Greenwell (1821–1882), English poet
- Linda Gregg (1942–2019), US poet
- Horace Gregory (1898–1982), US poet, translator and critic
- Eamon Grennan (born 1941), Irish poet
- Fulke Greville, 1st Baron Brooke (1554–1628), English poet, dramatist and statesman
- Susan Griffin (born 1943), US poet and writer
- Ann Griffiths (1776–1805), Welsh poet and hymnist
- Bill Griffiths (1948–2007), English poet and Anglo-Saxon scholar
- Jane Griffiths (born 1970), English poet and literary historian
- Rachel Eliza Griffiths (born 1978), US poet, photographer and visual artist
- Mariela Griffor (born 1961), Chilean poet, short-story writer and scholar
- Geoffrey Grigson (1905–1985), English poet and critic
- Franz Grillparzer (1791–1872), Austrian writer, poet and dramatist
- Nicholas Grimald (1519–1562), English poet and dramatist
- Angelina Weld Grimké (1880–1958), African-US playwright and poet
- Charlotte Forten Grimké (1835–1914), African-US poet
- Rufus W. Griswold (1815–1857), US anthologist, poet and critic
- Stanisław Grochowiak (1934–1976), Polish poet and dramatist
- Nikanor Grujić (1810–1887), Serbian writer, poet and bishop
- Stanisław Grochowiak (1934–1976), Polish poet and dramatist
- Philip Gross (born 1952), English poet, novelist and playwright
- Igo Gruden (1893–1948), Slovene poet and translator
- N. F. S. Grundtvig (1783–1872), Danish poet, pastor and historian
- Wioletta Grzegorzewska (born 1974), Polish poet and writer
- Barbara Guest (1920–2006), US poet and prose stylist
- Edgar Guest (1881–1959), English-born US poet
- Paul Guest (living), US poet and memoirist
- Bimal Guha (born 1952), Bangladesh poet writing in Bengali
- Guillaume de Lorris (c. 1200 – c. 1240), French scholar and poet
- Jorge Guillén (1893–1984), Spanish poet
- Nicolás Guillén (1902–1989), Cuban poet, activist and writer
- Guido Guinizelli (c. 1230–1276), Italian poet
- Guiot de Provins (died after 1208), French poet and trouvère
- Malcolm Guite (born 1957)
- Gül Baba (died 1541), Ottoman Bektashi dervish poet
- Nikolay Gumilyov (1886–1921), Russian poet who founded acmeism
- Ivan Gundulić (Gianfrancesco Gondola) (1589–1638), Croatian Baroque poet
- Thom Gunn (1929–2004), Anglo-US poet
- Lee Gurga (born 1949), US haiku poet
- Ivor Gurney (1890–1937), English composer and poet
- Lars Gustafsson (1936–2016), Swedish poet, novelist and scholar
- Pedro Juan Gutiérrez (born 1950), Cuban novelist and poet
- Beth Gylys (born 1964), US poet and professor
- István Gyöngyösi (1620–1704), Hungarian poet
- Géza Gyóni (1884–1917), Hungarian poet
- Brion Gysin (1916–1986), English writer and sound poet
- Gabor G. Gyukics (born 1958), Hungarian-US poet and translator (also in English)

== H ==
=== Ha ===
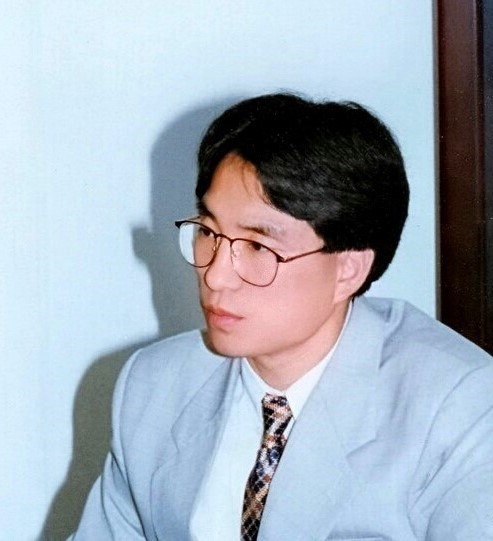
Ha Seung Moo

- Rafey Habib (living), Indian-born Muslim poet and scholar
- Marilyn Hacker (born 1942), US poet, translator and critic
- Hadraawi (1943–2022), Somaliland poet and songwriter
- Hafez (1315–1390), Persian poet
- Hai Zi (1964–1989), Chinese poet
- John Haines (1924–2011), US poet and educator
- Donald Hall (1928–2018), US poet, writer and critic; U.S. Poet Laureate, 2006-2007
- Arthur Hallam (1811–1833), English poet, subject of In Memoriam A.H.H. by Alfred Tennyson
- Michael Hamburger (1924–2007), English translator, poet and academic
- Jupiter Hammon (1711–c.1806), American poet, the first African American man published in North America
- Han Yu (768–824), Chinese essayist and poet of the Tang dynasty
- Hanshan (fl. 9th c.), Chinese poet of the Tang dynasty
- Thomas Hardy (1840–1928), English novelist and poet
- Joy Harjo (1951-), American poet, musician, playwright, and author; U.S. Poet Laureate, 2019-2022
- Charles Harpur (1813–1868), Australian poet
- Sir Theodore Wilson Harris (1921–2018), Guyanese poet, novelist and essayist
- Jim Harrison (1937–2016), US poet, novelist and essayist
- Tony Harrison (1937–2025), English poet and playwright
- Carla Harryman (born 1952), US poet, essayist and playwright
- David Harsent (born 1942), English poet and TV scriptwriter
- Paul Hartal (born 1936), Hungarian-born Canadian poet, painter and critic
- Peter Härtling (1933–2017), German writer and poet
- Michael Hartnett (1941–1999), Irish poet writing in English and Irish
- Julia Hartwig (1921–2017), Polish poet, writer and translator
- Gwen Harwood (1920–1995), Australian poet and librettist
- Alamgir Hashmi (born 1951), English poet of Pakistani origin
- Ahmet Haşim (c. 1884–1933), Turkish poet
- Robert Hass (born 1941), US poet; U.S Poet Laureate, 1995-1997
- Mohammed Abdullah Hassan (1856–1920), emir of the Dervish State, of which Diiriye Guure was sultan
- Olav H. Hauge (1908–1994), Norwegian poet
- Gerhart Hauptmann (1862–1946), German dramatist, poet and novelist; Nobel Prize in Literature, 1912
- Stephen Hawes (died 1523), English poet
- Robert Stephen Hawker (1803–1875), English poet, antiquarian and Anglican priest
- George Campbell Hay (1915–1984), Scottish poet and translator in Scottish Gaelic, Lowland Scots and English
- Gilbert Hay (fl. 15th c.), Scottish poet and translator in Middle Scots
- Robert Hayden (1913–1980), US poet, essayist and educator; U.S. Poet Laureate, 1976-1978
- William Hayley (1745–1820), English writer
- Tony Haynes (born 1960), US poet, songwriter and lyricist
- Ha Seung-moo(born October 13, 1963), Korean poet, professor and theologian

=== He ===
- Seamus Heaney (1939–2013), Nobel Prize-winning Irish poet, playwright and translator; 1995 Nobel Prize in Literature
- Josephine D. Heard (1861 – c. 1921), US teacher and poet
- John Heath-Stubbs (1918–2006), English poet and translator
- Anne Hébert (1916–2000), Canadian poet and novelist
- Anthony Hecht (1923–2004), US poet; U.S. Poet Laureate, 1982–1984
- Jennifer Michael Hecht (born 1965), US poet, historian and philosopher
- Allison Hedge Coke (born 1958), US poet, writer and performer
- Markus Hediger (born 1959), Swiss writer and translator
- Ilona Hegedűs (living), poet
- John Hegley (born 1953), English performance poet, comedian and songwriter
- Heinrich Heine (1797–1856), German poet, essayist and literary critic
- Lyn Hejinian (1941–2024), US poet, essayist and translator
- Acharya Hemachandra (1089–1172), Jain scholar, poet and polymath
- Felicia Hemans (1793–1835), English poet
- Marian Hemar (1901–1972), Polish poet, songwriter and playwright
- Essex Hemphill (1957–1995), US poet and activist
- Hamish Henderson (1919–2002), Scottish poet, songwriter and catalyst for folk revival in Scotland
- William Ernest Henley (1849–1903), English poet, critic and editor
- Adrian Henri (1932–2000), English poet and painter
- Robert Henryson (died c. 1500), Scottish poet
- Edward Herbert, 1st Baron Herbert of Cherbury (1583–1648), Anglo-Welsh soldier, historian, poet and philosopher; brother of George Herbert
- George Herbert (1593–1633), public orator and poet
- Mary Herbert, Countess of Pembroke (1561–1621) (née Sidney), early English woman in literature
- Zbigniew Herbert (1924–1998), Polish poet, essayist and dramatist
- David Herbison (1800–1880), Irish poet, writing in Ulster Scots dialect and English
- Johann Gottfried Herder (1744–1803), German philosopher, theologian and literary critic
- Miguel Hernández (1910–1942), Spanish poet and playwright of Generation of '27 and Generation of '36 movements
- Herodas or Herondas (3rd c. BCE), Greek poet and author of humorous dramatic scenes in verse
- Antoine Héroet (died 1568), French poet
- Juan Felipe Herrera (1948-); American poet, performer, writer, toonist, teacher, and activist; U.S. Poet Laureate, 2015–2017
- Robert Herrick (1591–1674), English poet
- Thomas Kibble Hervey (1799–1859), Scottish-born English poet and critic
- Hesiod (fl. 750–650 BCE), Ancient Greek poet
- Phoebe Hesketh (1909–2005), English poet
- Hermann Hesse (1877–1962), German-Swiss poet, novelist and painter
- Dorothy Hewett (1923–2002), Australian feminist poet, novelist and playwright
- John Harold Hewitt (1907–1987), Northern Irish poet
- William Heyen (born 1940), US poet, literary critic, novelist
- Thomas Heywood (c. 1570s – 1641), English playwright, actor and author

=== Hi–Hy ===
- Dick Higgins (1938–1998), English poet and publisher
- Scott Hightower (born 1952), US poet and teacher
- Nâzım Hikmet (1902–1963), Turkish poet, playwright and novelist
- Geoffrey Hill (1932–2016), English poet and professor
- Selima Hill (born 1945), English poet
- Hilda Hilst (1930–2004), Brazilian poet, playwright and novelist
- Ellen Hinsey (born 1960), US poet
- Hipponax (6th c. BCE), of Ephesus, Ancient Greek iambic poet
- Hirato Renkichi (1893–1922), Japanese avant-garde poet
- Rozalie Hirs (born 1965), Dutch poet
- Jane Hirshfield (born 1953), US poet
- George Parks Hitchcock (1914–2010), US poet, playwright and painter
- H. L. Hix (born 1960), US poet and academic
- Marian Hluszkewycz (1877–1935), Russian poet
- Thomas Hoccleve or Occleve (c. 1368 – 1426), English poet and clerk
- Daniel Hoffman (1923–2013), American poet, essayist, and academic; U.S. Poet Laureate, 1973–1974
- Michael Hofmann (born 1957), German-born poet and translator in English
- Hugo von Hofmannsthal (1874–1929), Austrian novelist, poet and dramatist
- James Hogg (1770–1835), Scottish poet and novelist
- David Holbrook (1923–2011), English writer, poet and academic
- Friedrich Hölderlin (1770–1843), German lyric poet
- Margaret Holford (1778–1852), English poet and novelist
- Barbara Holland (1933–2010), US author
- John Hollander (1929–2013), Jewish-US poet and literary critic
- Matthew Hollis (born 1971), English poet
- Oliver Wendell Holmes (1809–1894), US poet, professor and author
- Homer (fl. 8th c. BCE), Greek epic poet
- Thomas Hood (1799–1845), English humorist and poet; father of playwright and editor Tom Hood
- A. D. Hope (1907–2000), Australian satirical poet and essayist
- Gerard Manley Hopkins (1844–1889), English poet and Jesuit priest
- Horace (Quintus Horatius Flaccus) (65–08 BCE), Roman lyric poet
- George Moses Horton (1797–1884), African-US poet
- Joan Houlihan, US poet
- A. E. Housman (1859–1936), English poet and classicist
- Libby Houston (born 1941), English poet, botanist and rock climber
- Henry Howard, Earl of Surrey (1517–1547), English Renaissance poet
- Richard Howard (1929–2022), US poet, critic and essayist
- Fanny Howe (1940–2025), US poet and fiction writer
- Susan Howe (born 1937), US poet, scholar and essayist
- Hrotsvitha (died c. 1002), poet and first known female dramatist, from Lower Saxony
- Mohammad Nurul Huda (born 1949), Bangladeshi poet in Bengali
- John Ceiriog Hughes (1832–1887), Welsh poet in Welsh
- Langston Hughes (1902–1967), US poet, novelist and playwright
- Ted Hughes (1930–1998), English poet and children's writer; UK Poet Laureate
- Richard Hugo (1923–1982), US poet
- Victor Hugo (1802–1885), French poet, novelist and dramatist
- Vicente Huidobro (1893–1948), Chilean poet
- Lynda Hull (1954–1994), US poet
- Keri Hulme (1947–2021), New Zealand poet and fiction writer
- Thomas Ernest Hulme (1883–1917), English critic and poet
- Alexander Hume (1560–1609), Scottish poet
- Leigh Hunt (1784–1859), English critic, essayist and poet
- Sam Hunt (born 1946), New Zealand poet
- Cynthia Huntington US poet, professor, memoirist
- Hồ Xuân Hương (1772–1822), Vietnamese poet
- Aldous Huxley (1894–1963), English novelist, poet and travel writer
- Hwang Myung (1931–1998), Korean poet
- Abby B. Hyde (1799–1872), American hymnwriter
- Helen von Kolnitz Hyer (1896–1983), US poet and writer; South Carolina Poet Laureate, 1974–1983

== I ==
- Khadijah Ibrahiim (fl. 2022), British poet
- Henrik Johan Ibsen (1828–1906), Norwegian playwright, director and poet
- Ibycus (fl. late 6th c. BCE), Ancient Greek lyric poet
- Ikkyu (1394–1481), Japanese Zen Buddhist monk and poet
- Vojislav Ilić (1860–1894), Serbian poet
- Gyula Illyés (1902–1983), Hungarian poet and novelist
- Maria Ilnicka (1825 or 1827–1897), Polish poet, novelist and translator
- Lawson Fusao Inada (born 1938), US poet
- Sabit Ince (born 1954), Turkish lyric poet
- Tonya Ingram (1991–2022), US poet
- Sir Dr. Muhammad Iqbal (1877–1938), Indian poet in Urdu and Persian
- Avetik Isahakyan (1875–1957), Armenian lyric poet
- Taufik Ismail (1935), Indonesian poet, activist and editor
- Inge Israel (1927–2019), Canadian poet and playwright
- Wacław Iwaniuk (1912–2001), Polish poet and journalist
- Jarosław Iwaszkiewicz (Eleuter, 1894–1980), Polish poet, dramatist and translator
- Sergey Izgiyaev (1922–1972), Russian poet, playwright and translator of Mountain Jewish descent

== J ==
- FP Jac (1955–2008), Danish poet
- Violet Jacob (1863–1946), Scottish poet in Scots
- Josephine Jacobsen (1908–2003), Canadian-born American poet, short story writer, essayist, and critic; U.S. Poet Laureate, 1971-1973
- Rolf Jacobsen (1907–1994), Norwegian poet and writer
- Ada Jafarey (1924–2015), Pakistani poet in Urdu
- Richard Jago (1715–1781), English poet
- Đura Jakšić (1832–1878), Serbian poet, painter and dramatist
- James I, King of Scots (1394–1437), author of The Kingis Quair
- James VI and I (1566–1625), King of Scots and of England and Ireland
- Christine James (born 1954), Welsh poet and academic
- Clive James (1939–2019), Australian author, poet and memoirist
- Ernst Jandl (1925–2000), Austrian writer, poet and translator
- Klemens Janicki (1516–1543), Polish poet in Latin
- Janus Pannonius (1434–1472), Hungarian/Slavonian poet in Latin
- Patricia Janus (1932–2006), US poet and artist
- Mark F. Jarman (born 1952), US poet and critic
- Randall Jarrell (1914–1965), US poet, children's author and novelist; U.S. Poet Laureate, 1956-1958
- Bruno Jasieński (1901–1938), Polish poet, novelist and playwright
- Mieczysław Jastrun (1903–1983), Polish poet and essayist
- László Jávor (1903–1992), Hungarian poet
- Robinson Jeffers (1887–1962), US poet
- Vojin Jelić (1921–2004), Croatian Serb poet and writer
- Rod Jellema (1927–2018), US poet, teacher and translator
- Simon Jenko (1835–1869), Slovene poet, lyricist and writer
- Elizabeth Jennings (1926–2001), English poet
- Johannes V. Jensen (1873–1950) Nobel Prize-winning poet and author
- Jia Dao (779–843), Chinese poet active under the Tang dynasty
- Juan Ramón Jiménez (1881–1958) Nobel Prize-winning Spanish poet and writer
- John of the Cross (1542–1591), Spanish mystic and poet
- Edmund John (1883–1917), English poet
- Georgia Douglas Johnson (1880–1966), US poet
- Helene Johnson (1906–1995), African-US poet
- James Weldon Johnson (1871–1938), US author, poet and folklorist
- Linton Kwesi Johnson (born 1952), Jamaica-born, British-based dub poet
- Lionel Johnson (1867–1902), English poet, essayist and critic
- Emily Pauline Johnson (in Mohawk: Tekahionwake) (1861–1913), Canadian writer, performer and poet marking First Nations heritage
- Samuel Johnson (1709–1784), English poet, essayist and lexicographer
- George Benson Johnston (1913–2004), Canadian poet, translator and academic
- Anna Jókai (1932–2017), Hungarian poet and prose writer
- David Jones (1895–1974), English artist and poet
- Edward Smyth Jones (1881–1968), African-American poet
- Richard Jones (living), English US poet
- Ben Jonson (1573–1637), English poet and dramatist
- June Jordan (1936–2002), US poet and educator
- Anthony Joseph (born 1966), British/Trinidadian poet, novelist and musician
- Jenny Joseph (1932–2018), English poet
- Jovan Jovanović Zmaj (1833–1904), Serbian poet, physician
- James Joyce (1882–1941), Irish novelist and poet
- Attila József (1905–1937), Hungarian poet
- Frank Judge (1946–2021), US editor, poet and film critic
- Ferenc Juhász (1928–2015), Hungarian poet
- Gyula Juhász (1883–1937), Hungarian poet
- Jamal Jumá, Iraqi poet and researcher
- Donald Justice (1925–2004), US poet
- Juvenal (fl. 1st c. – 2nd c. CE), Roman poet and satirist
- Jumoke Verissimo (born 1979), Nigerian poet
- Jaydeep Sarangi (born 1973), Indian poet in English

== K ==
=== Ka–Kh ===
- Abhay K (born 1980), Indian poet and diplomat
- Kabir (1440–1518), mystic poet and sant of India
- Margit Kaffka (1880–1918), Hungarian poet and novelist
- Kālidāsa (fl. c. 4th c.), Sanskrit poet
- Kambar (c. 1180–1250), Tamil poet
- Anna Kamieńska (1920–1986), Polish poet, translator and critic
- Kannadasan (1927–1981), Tamil poet, author and lyricist
- Jim Kacian (born 1953), US haiku poet and editor
- Uuno Kailas (1901–1933), Finnish poet, author and translator
- Chester Kallman (1921–1975), US poet, librettist and translator
- László Kálnoky (1912–1985), Hungarian poet and translator
- Kálmán Kalocsay (1891–1976), Hungarian and Esperanto poet
- Anna Kamieńska (1920–1986), Polish poet, writer and critic
- Ilya Kaminsky (born 1977), Russian-US poet, critic and translator
- Orhan Veli Kanik (1914–1950), Turkish poet
- Sándor Kányádi (1929–2018), Hungarian poet and translator from Romania
- Jaan Kaplinski (1941–2021), Estonian poet, philosopher and critic
- Adeena Karasick (born 1965), Canadian/US poet, media artist and essayist
- Vim Karenine (born 1933), US poet, essayist and novelist
- Erik Axel Karlfeldt (1864–1931), Nobel Prize-winning Swedish poet
- György Károly (1953–2018), Hungarian poet and critic
- Franciszek Karpiński (1741–1825), Polish poet
- Mary Karr (born 1955), US poet, essayist and memoirist
- Siavash Kasrai (1927–1996), Iranian poet, Persian poet
- Julia Kasdorf (born 1962), US poet
- Laura Kasischke (born 1961), US poet and fiction writer
- Jan Kasprowicz (1860–1926), Polish poet, playwright and critic
- Lajos Kassák (1887–1967), Hungarian poet, novelist and painter
- Erich Kästner (1899–1974), German author, poet and satirist
- József Katona (1791–1830), Hungarian playwright and poet
- Bob Kaufman (1925–1986), US beat poet and surrealist
- Shirley Kaufman (1923–2016), US poet and translator
- Rupi Kaur (born 1992), Indo-Canadian poet and photographer
- Patrick Kavanagh (1904–1967), Irish poet and novelist
- Nikos Kavvadias (1910–1975), Greek poet
- Kazi Nazrul Islam (1899–1976), Bengali poet, musician and revolutionary
- John Keats (1795–1821), English Romantic poet
- Weldon Kees (1914–1955), US poet, novelist and critic
- Hans Keilson (1909-2011), German-Dutch novelist, poet, psychoanalyst and child psychologist
- Isabella Kelly (1759–1857), Scottish poet and novelist
- Arthur Kelton (died 1549/1550), rhymer on Welsh history
- Miranda Kennedy (born 1975), US poet
- Rann Kennedy (1772–1851), English poet
- Walter Kennedy (c. 1455–1518), Scottish makar
- X. J. Kennedy (1929–2026), US poet, anthologist and children's writer
- Jane Kenyon (1947–1995), US poet and translator
- Géza Képes (1909–1989), Hungarian poet and translator
- Khwaju Kermani (1290–1349), Persian poet
- Jack Kerouac (1922–1969), US novelist and poet
- Sidney Keyes (1922–1943), English poet killed in action in World War II
- Keorapetse Kgositsile (1938–2018), South African poet
- Mimi Khalvati (born 1944), Iranian-born British poet
- Dilwar Khan (1937–2013), Bangladeshi poet
- Khushal Khan Khattak (1613–1689), Pashtun Afghan poet, warrior and tribal chief
- Omar Khayyám (1048–1122), Persian mathematician, astronomer and poet
- Khaqani (1120–1199), Persian poet
- Kherdian, David (born 1931), Armenian-American writer, poet, and editor
- Vladislav Khodasevich (1886–1939), Russian poet and literary critic
- Talib Khundmiri (1938–2011), Indian poet and humorist in Urdu
- Ab'ul Hasan Yamīn ud-Dīn Khusrow (1253–1325), Sufi poet, scholar and musician

=== Ki–Ky ===
- Saba Kidane (born 1978), Eritrean poet
- Søren Kierkegaard (1813–1855), Danish philosopher and poet
- Emelihter Kihleng, Pohnpeian poet and academic
- Andrzej Tadeusz Kijowski (born 1954), Polish poet and politician
- Takarai Kikaku (1661–1707), Japanese haikai poet and disciple of Matsuo Bashō
- Joyce Kilmer (1886–1918), US writer and poet
- Edward King (1612–1637), Irish-born subject of Milton's Lycidas
- Henry King (1592–1669), English poet and bishop
- William King (1663–1712), English poet
- Thomas Hansen Kingo (1634–1703), Danish bishop, poet and hymnist
- Gottfried Kinkel (1815–1882), German poet and revolutionary
- Galway Kinnell (1927–2014), US poet; Pulitzer Prize for Poetry 1982
- John Kinsella (born 1963), Australian poet, novelist and essayist
- Thomas Kinsella (1928–2021), Irish poet, translator and editor
- Rudyard Kipling (1865–1936), English fiction writer and poet
- Easterine Kire (born 1959), Naga poet and novelist
- Danilo Kiš (1935–1989), Serbian fiction writer and poet
- Necip Fazıl Kısakürek (1904–1983), Turkish poet, novelist and playwright
- Atala Kisfaludy (1836–1911), Hungarian poet
- Iya Kiva (born 1984), Ukrainian poet
- Eila Kivikk'aho (1921–2004), Finnish poet
- Carolyn Kizer (1925–2014), US poet; Pulitzer Prize for Poetry 1985
- Sarah Klassen (born 1932), Canadian poet and fiction writer
- August Kleinzahler (born 1949), US poet
- Friedrich Gottlieb Klopstock (1724–1803), German poet
- Franciszek Dionizy Kniaźnin (1750–1807), Polish poet and Jesuit
- Etheridge Knight (1931–1991), African-US poet
- Kobayashi Issa (1763–1828), Japanese haikai poet
- Jan Kochanowski (1530–1584), Polish Renaissance poet
- Kenneth Koch (1925–2002), US poet, playwright and professor
- Jan Kochanowski (1530–1584), Polish poet
- Petar Kočić (1877–1916), Bosnian Serb writer
- István Koháry (1649–1731), Hungarian poet
- Ferenc Kölcsey (1790–1838), Hungarian poet
- Aladár Komját (1891–1937), Hungarian poet
- Yusef Komunyakaa (born 1947), US poet and teacher; Pulitzer Prize for Poetry 1994
- Béla Kondor (1931–1972), Hungarian poet, prose writer and painter
- Faik Konitza (1875–1942), Albanian poet
- Halina Konopacka (1900–1989), Polish poet and athlete
- Maria Konopnicka (1842–1910), Polish poet, novelist and children's writer
- Ted Kooser (born 1939), US poet; U.S. Poet Laureate, 2004–2006
- Stanisław Korab-Brzozowski (1876–1901), Polish poet and translator
- Julian Kornhauser (born 1946), Polish poet, novelist and critic
- Apollo Korzeniowski (1820–1869), Polish expressionist poet
- József Kossics (Jožef Košič, 1788–1867), Hungarian/Slovenian poet and priest
- Laza Kostić (1841–1910), Serbian poet, writer and polyglot
- Dezső Kosztolányi (1885–1936), Hungarian poet and prose writer
- Gopi Kottoor (born 1956), Indian poet, playwright and editor
- Urszula Kozioł (1931–2025), Polish poet
- Taja Kramberger (born 1970), Slovenian poet, translator and anthropologist
- Ignacy Krasicki (1735–1801), Polish poet and novelist
- Zygmunt Krasiński (1812–1859), Polish poet
- Zlatko Krasni (1951–2008), Serbian poet
- Ruth Krauss (1901–1993), US poet and children's book author
- Krayem Awad (born 1948), Syrian-Austrian painter, sculptor and poet
- Carolyn Kreiter-Foronda (born 1946), US writer; Poet Laureate of Virginia, 2006–2008
- Katarzyna Krenz (born 1953), poet, novelist and painter
- Miroslav Krleža (1893–1981), Croatian/Yugoslav poet and novelist
- Antjie Krog (born 1952), South African poet, academic and writer
- Józef Krupiński (1930–1998), Polish poet
- Ryszard Krynicki (born 1943), Polish poet and translator
- Marilyn Krysl (1942–2024), US poet and fiction writer
- Andrzej Krzycki (1482–1537), Polish poet and archbishop

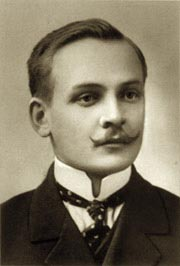
Yanka Kupala

- Žofia Kubini (fl. 17th c.), Hungarian poet in early Czech
- Paweł Kubisz (1907–1968), Polish poet and journalist
- Péter Kuczka (1923–1999), Hungarian poet and critic
- Anatoly Kudryavitsky (born 1954), Russian/Irish novelist, poet and translator
- Endre Kukorelly (born 1951), Hungarian poet and journalist
- Maxine Kumin (1925–2014), US poet; U.S. Poet Laureate, 1981–82
- Stanley Kunitz (1905–2006), US poet; U.S. Poet Laureate, 1974-1976 and 2000-2001
- Yanka Kupala (1882–1942), Belarus poet
- Tuli Kupferberg (1923–2010), US counterculture poet and author
- Jalu Kurek (1904–1983), Polish poet and prose writer
- Momoko Kuroda (黒田杏子, 1938–2023), Japanese haiku poet
- Mira Kuś (born 1958), Polish poet
- Kusumagraj (1912–1999), Indian Marathi poet, writer and humanist
- Onat Kutlar (1936–1995), Turkish writer and poet
- Stephen Kuusisto (born 1955), US poet
- Sir Francis Kynaston or Kinaston (1587–1642), English poet

== L ==
=== La ===
- Jean de La Fontaine (1621–1695), French fabulist
- Ilmar Laaban (1921–2000), Estonian poet
- Pierre Labrie (born 1972), Canadian poet in French
- László Ladányi (1907–1992), Hungarian-Israeli poet and writer
- Jules Laforgue (1860–1887), Franco-Uruguayan poet
- Abolqasem Lahouti (1887–1957), Persian poet
- Jarkko Laine (1947–2006), Finnish poet, writer and playwright
- Ivan V. Lalić (1931–1996), Serbian poet
- Philip Lamantia (1927–2005), US poet and lecturer
- Kendrick Lamar (born 1987), US poet and hip-hop artist
- Alphonse de Lamartine (1790–1869), French writer, poet and politician
- Charles Lamb (1775–1834), English essayist and poet
- Peter Lampe (born 1954), German scholar, writer and poet
- Letitia Elizabeth Landon (L. E. L.) (1802–1838), English poet and novelist
- Walter Savage Landor (1775–1864), English writer and poet
- Antoni Lange (1863–1929), Polish poet, philosopher and translator
- William Langland (c. 1332 – c. 1386), probable English author of dream-vision Piers Plowman
- Emilia Lanier (1569–1645), English poet
- Sebestyén Tinódi Lantos (c. 1510–1556), Hungarian poet and historian
- Laozi (Lau-tzu) (fl. 6th c. BCE), Chinese philosopher and poet
- Alda Lara (1930–1962), Angolan poet
- Rebecca Hammond Lard (1772–1855), US poet
- Bruce Larkin (born 1957), US children's author and poet
- Philip Larkin (1922–1985), English poet and novelist
- Claudia Lars (1899–1974), Salvadoran poet
- Else Lasker-Schüler (1869–1945), German poet and playwright
- Lasus of Hermione (6th c. BCE), Greek lyric poet from Hermione in Argolid
- Evelyn Lau (born 1971), Canadian poet and novelist
- James Laughlin (1914–1997), US poet and publisher
- Ann Lauterbach (born 1942), US poet, essayist and professor
- Comte de Lautréamont (1846–1870), Uruguayan/French poet
- Dorianne Laux (born 1952), US poet
- Christine Lavant (1915–1973), Austrian poet and novelist
- D. H. Lawrence (1885–1930), English novelist, poet and critic
- Henry Lawson (1867–1922), Australian writer and poet; son of Louisa Lawson
- Louisa Lawson (1848–1920), Australian poet and feminist
- Robert Lax (1915–2000), US poet
- Laxmi Prasad Devkota (1909–1959), Nepalese poet and scholar
- Henryka Łazowertówna (1909–1942), Polish poet

=== Le ===
- Edward Lear (1812–1888), English poet, artist and illustrator
- Stanisław Jerzy Lec (1909–1966), Polish poet and aphorist
- Joanna Lech (born 1984), Polish poet and novelist
- Jan Lechoń (1899–1956), Polish poet, critic and diplomat
- Francis Ledwidge (1887–1917), Irish war poet
- David Lee (born 1966), US poet
- Dennis Lee (born 1939), Canadian poet, editor and critic
- David Lehman (born 1948), US poet and editor
- Ágnes Lehóczky (born 1976), Hungarian poet, academic and translator
- Eino Leino (1878–1926), Finnish poet and journalist
- Brad Leithauser (born 1953), US poet, novelist and essayist
- Alexander Lenard (1910–1972), Hungarian writer and poet
- Sue Lenier (born 1957), English poet and playwright
- Lalitha Lenin (born 1946), Indian poet
- Krystyna Lenkowska (born 1957), Polish poet and translator
- Charlotte Lennox (c. 1730–1804), Scottish poet and novelist
- John Leonard (born 1965), Australian poet
- Giacomo Leopardi (1798–1837), Italian poet, essayist and philologist
- Mikhail Lermontov (1814–1841), Russian writer, poet and painter
- Ben Lerner (born 1979), US poet, novelist and critic
- Bolesław Leśmian (1877–1937), Polish poet and artist
- Rika Lesser (born 1953), US poet and translator
- Gotthold Ephraim Lessing (1729–1781), German writer, philosopher and dramatist
- Denise Levertov (1927–1997), British-born US poet
- Dana Levin (born 1965), US poet and teacher
- Philip Levine (1928–2015), US poet; U.S. Poet Laureate, 2011–2012
- Larry Levis (1946–1996), US poet
- D. A. Levy (1942–1968), US poet, artist and publisher
- William Levy (1939–2019), US poet, fiction writer and editor
- Oswald LeWinter (1931–2013), poet
- Alun Lewis (1915–1944), Welsh poet in English
- C. S. Lewis (1898–1963), Northern Irish novelist, poet and essayist
- Gwyneth Lewis (born 1959), Welsh poet; inaugural National Poet of Wales
- J. Patrick Lewis (born 1942), US children's poet
- Saunders Lewis (1893–1985), Welsh poet, dramatist and critic
- Wyndham Lewis (1884–1957), English painter and author

=== Li–Ly ===
- Li Houzhu (937–978), Chinese poet and ruler of Southern Tang Kingdom (961–975 CE)
- José Lezama Lima (1910–1976), Cuban writer and poet
- Tim Liardet (born 1959), English poet, critic and professor
- Li Bai (701–762), Chinese Tang dynasty poet
- Jerzy Liebert (1904–1931), Polish poet
- Li Jiao, poet under the Tang and Zhou dynasties
- Li Qingzhao (1084–1151), Chinese Song dynasty writer and poet
- Li Shangyin (813–858), Chinese late Tang-dynasty poet
- Tim Lilburn (born 1950), Canadian poet and essayist
- Ada Limón (1976–), American poet; U.S. Poet Laureate, 2022–present
- Anne Morrow Lindbergh (1906–2001), US author and aviator; wife of Charles Lindbergh
- Jack Lindeman (fl. late 20th c.), US poet and critic
- Sarah Lindsay (born 1958), US poet
- Rossy Evelin Lima (born 1986), Mexican poet
- Vachel Lindsay (1879–1931), US poet
- Ewa Lipska (born 1945), Polish poet
- László Listi (1628–1662), Hungarian poet
- Alun Llywelyn-Williams (1913–1988), Welsh poet and critic
- Józef Łobodowski (1909–1988), Polish poet and political thinker
- Terry Locke (born 1946), New Zealand poet, anthologist and academic
- Thomas Lodge (1558–1625), English dramatist and writer
- Iain Lom (c. 1624 – c. 1710), Scottish Gaelic poet
- Henry Wadsworth Longfellow (1807–1882), US poet and educator
- Michael Longley (1939–2025), Northern Irish poet
- Federico García Lorca (1898–1936), Spanish poet, dramatist and stage director
- Audre Lorde (1934–1992), Caribbean-US writer, poet and librarian
- Richard Lovelace (1618–1658), English Cavalier poet
- Amy Lowell (1874–1925), US poet
- James Russell Lowell (1819–1891), US poet, critic and diplomat
- Robert Lowell (1917–1977), US poet; U.S. Poet Laureate, 1947–1948
- Maria White Lowell (1821–1853), US poet and abolitionist
- Tom Lowenstein (1941–2025), English poet, ethnographer, cultural historian and translator
- Solomon Löwisohn (1788–1821), Hungarian Jewish poet and historian in Hebrew and German
- Mina Loy (1882–1966), English poet, playwright and novelist
- Lu You (1125–1209), Chinese Song dynasty poet
- Stanisław Herakliusz Lubomirski (1642–1702), Polish poet, writer and politician
- Gherasim Luca (1913–1994), Romanian poet and surrealist
- Lucan (39–65 CE), Roman poet
- Edward Lucie-Smith (born 1933), English writer, poet and broadcaster
- Gaius Lucilius (fl. 2nd c. BCE), Roman satirist
- Lucilius Junior (fl. 1st c. CE), poet and Procurator of Sicily
- Lucretius (c. 99 BCE – c. 55 BCE), Roman poet and philosopher
- Fitz Hugh Ludlow (1836–1870), US author, journalist and explorer
- Edith Gyömrői Ludowyk (1896–1987), Hungarian poet and politician
- Luo Binwang (640–684), Chinese Tang-dynasty writer and poet
- Thomas Lux (1946–2017), US poet
- Mario Luzi (1914–2005), Italian poet
- John Lydgate (1370–1450), English monk and poet
- John Lyly (1553–1606), English writer, poet and dramatist
- Sir David Lyndsay of the Mount (c. 1490 – c. 1555), Scottish Lord Lyon and poet
- Sandford Lyne (1945–2007), US poet, educator and editor
- George Lyttelton (1709–1773), English poet, statesman and arts patron

== M ==
=== Ma ===
- Thomas Babington Macaulay, 1st Baron Macaulay (1800–1859), Anglo-Scottish poet and historian
- George MacBeth (1932–1992), Scottish poet and novelist
- Norman MacCaig (1910–1996), Scottish poet
- Elizabeth Roberts MacDonald (1864–1922), Canadian poet and writer
- Hugh MacDiarmid (1892–1978), Scottish poet
- George MacDonald (1824–1905), Scottish poet and novelist
- Sorley MacLean (1911–1996), Scottish Gaelic poet
- Gwendolyn MacEwen (1941–1987), Canadian writer and poet
- Antonio Machado (1875–1939), Spanish poet
- Arthur Machen (1863–1947), Welsh author and mystic
- Compton Mackenzie (1883–1972), Scottish writer, memoirist and poet
- Archibald MacLeish (1892–1987), US modernist poet and writer
- Aonghas MacNeacail (1942–2022), writer in Scottish Gaelic
- Louis MacNeice (1907–1963), Irish poet and playwright
- Hector Macneill (1746–1818), Scottish poet and songwriter
- Valerie Macon (born 1950), US poet and civil servant
- James Macpherson (1736–1796), Scottish writer and poet
- Gajanan Digambar Madgulkar (1919–1977), Marathi and Hindi poet and playwright
- Haki R. Madhubuti (born 1942), African-US writer, poet and educator
- Viggo Madsen (1943–2025), Danish poet and writer
- John Gillespie Magee Jr. (1922–1941), US poet and aviator
- Eric Magrane (born 1975), US poet and geographer
- Jayanta Mahapatra (1928–2023), Indian English poet
- Derek Mahon (1941–2020), Northern Irish poet
- Mahsati (13th c.), Persian poet
- Rudolf Maister (1874–1934), Slovene poet and activist
- János Majláth (1786–1855), Hungarian historian and poet
- Clarence Major (born 1936), US poet, painter and novelist
- Desanka Maksimović (1898–1993), Serbian poet and professor
- Antoni Malczewski (1793–1826), Polish poet
- Marcin Malek (born 1975), Polish poet, writer and playwright
- Josh Malihabadi (born Shabbir Hasan Khan) (1898–1982), Indian Urdu poet
- Madayyagari Mallana (fl. 15th c.), Telugu poet
- Stephane Mallarme (1842–1898), French poet and critic
- David Mallet (c. 1705–1765), Scottish dramatist and poet
- Thomas Malory (1405–1471), English author of Le Morte d'Arthur
- David Malouf (1934–2026), Australian poet and writer
- Goffredo Mameli (1827–1849), Italian patriot, poet and writer
- Osip Mandelstam (also Mandelshtam, 1891–1938), Russian poet
- James Clarence Mangan (1803–1849), Irish poet
- Bill Manhire (born 1946), New Zealand poet and fiction writer; New Zealand Poet Laureate
- Marcus Manilius (fl. 1st c. CE), Roman poet and astrologer
- Maurice Manning (born 1966), US poet
- Ruth Manning-Sanders (1895–1988), Welsh-born English poet and author
- Robert Mannyng (1275–1340), English chronicler and monk in Middle English, French and Latin
- Chris Mansell (born 1953), Australian poet and publisher
- Jakobe Mansztajn (born 1982), Polish poet and blogger
- Manuchehri (Abu Najm Ahmad ibn Ahmad ibn Qaus Manuchehri; 11th c.), royal poet in Persia
- Alessandro Manzoni (1785–1873), Italian poet and novelist
- Sándor Márai (1900–1989), Hungarian/US poet and novelist
- Ausiàs March (1397–1459), Valencian poet and knight
- Morton Marcus (1936–2009), US poet and author
- Mareez (1917–1983), Indian poet in Gujarati
- Paul Mariani (born 1940), US poet and academic
- Marie de France (fl. 12th c.), poet probably French-born and resident in England
- Filippo Tommaso Marinetti (1876–1944), Italian poet and editor
- Giambattista Marino (1569–1625), Italian poet
- E. A. Markham (1939–2008), Montserrat poet, playwright and novelist
- Edwin Markham (1852–1940), US poet
- Đorđe Marković Koder (1806–1891), Serbian poet
- Christopher Marlowe (1564–1593), English dramatist, poet and translator
- Clément Marot (1496–1544), French Renaissance poet
- Don Marquis (1878–1937), US novelist, poet and playwright
- Edward Garrard Marsh (1783–1862), English poet and cleric
- John Marston (1576–1634), English playwright, poet and satirist
- José Martí (1853–1895), Cuban poet and writer
- Martial (40 – c. 102 CE), Roman epigrammatist
- Camille Martin (born 1956), Canadian poet and collage artist
- Harry Martinson (1904–1978), Swedish sailor, author and poet
- Andrew Marvell (1621–1678), English metaphysical poet and politician
- John Masefield (1878–1967), English poet and writer; UK Poet Laureate, 1930–1967
- Masud Sa'd Salman (1046–1121), Persian poet
- Edgar Lee Masters (1868–1950), US poet, biographer and dramatist
- Dafydd Llwyd Mathau (fl. earlier 17th c.), Welsh poet in Welsh
- János Mattis-Teutsch (1884–1960), Hungarian-Romanian poet and artist
- Glyn Maxwell (born 1962), British poet, playwright and librettist
- Vladimir Mayakovsky (1893–1930), Russian/Soviet poet and playwright
- Karl May (1842–1912), German writer, poet and musician
- Bernadette Mayer (1945–2022), US poet and prose writer
- Ben Mazer (born 1964), US poet and editor

=== Mc–Me ===
- James McAuley (1917–1976), Australian poet and critic
- Susan McCaslin (born 1947), Canadian/US poet and critic
- J. D. McClatchy (1945–2018), US poet and critic
- Michael McClure (1932–2020), US poet, playwright and novelist
- John McCrae (1872–1918), Canadian poet, physician and artist
- Walt McDonald (1934–2022), US poet; Poet Laureate of Texas, 2001
- Dermit McEncroe (fl. early 18th c.), Irish doctor and poet
- Elvis McGonagall, Scottish poet and comedian
- William Topaz McGonagall (1825–1902), Scottish writer of doggerel
- Roger McGough (born 1937), English comedian and poet
- Campbell McGrath (born 1962), US poet
- Wendy McGrath, Canadian poet and novelist
- Thomas McGrath (1916–1990), US poet
- Heather McHugh (born 1948), US poet, translator and educator
- Duncan Ban McIntyre (1724–1812), Scottish poet in Scottish Gaelic
- James McIntyre (1827–1906), Canadian writer of doggerel
- Claude McKay (1889–1948), Jamaican-US writer and poet
- Don McKay (born 1942), Canadian poet, editor and educator
- Rod McKuen (1933–2015), US poet, composer and singer
- James McMichael (born 1939), US poet
- Ian McMillan (born 1956), English poet, playwright and broadcaster
- Meera (1498–1546), Indian Hindu mystic poet and Krishna devotee
- Narsinh Mehta (c. 1414 – c. 1481), Indian poet-saint of Gujarat
- Mei Yaochen (1002–1060), Chinese Song dynasty poet
- Peter Meinke (born 1932), US poet and fiction writer
- Cecília Meireles (1901–1964), Brazilian poet
- Herman Melville (1819–1891), US fiction writer and poet
- Meng Haoran (689 or 691–740), Chinese Tang dynasty poet
- George Meredith (1828–1909), English poet and novelist
- Bert Meyers (1928-1979) American Poet.
- William Morris Meredith Jr. (1919–2007), American poet and educator; U.S. Poet Laureate, 1978-1980
- Kersti Merilaas (1913–1986), Estonian poet
- Alda Merini (1931–2009), Italian writer and poet
- Stuart Merrill (1863–1915), US poet writing mainly in French
- James Merrill (1926–1995), US poet; 1977 Pulitzer Prize for Poetry
- Thomas Merton (1915–1968), US writer and Trappist monk
- W. S. Merwin (1927–2019), US poet and author; 1971 and 2009 Pulitzer Prize for Poetry; U.S. Poet Laureate, 2010-2011
- Sarah Messer (born 1966), US poet and writer
- Charlotte Mew (1869–1928), English poet
- Henry Meyer (1840–1925), US poet writing in Pennsylvania Dutch
- Ferenc Mező (1885–1961), Hungarian poet

=== Mi–Mo ===
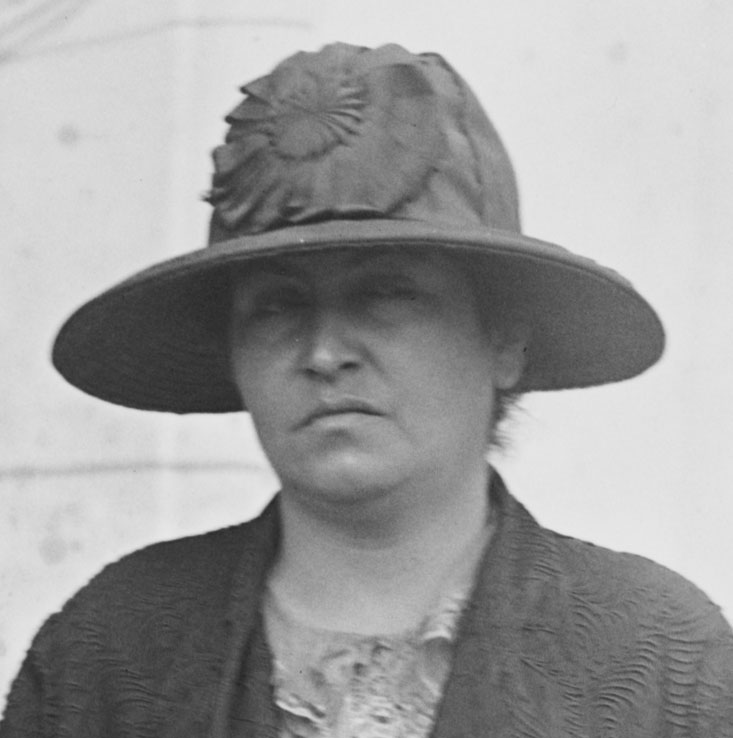
Gabriela Mistral

- Henri Michaux (1899–1984), Belgian/French poet, writer and painter
- Michelangelo di Lodovico Buonarroti Simoni (1475–1564), Italian poet and sculptor
- Tadeusz Miciński (1873–1918), Polish poet and playwright
- Adam Mickiewicz (1798–1855), Polish poet, essayist and publicist
- Veronica Micle (1850–1889), Austrian/Romanian poet
- Christopher Middleton (c. 1560–1628), English poet and translator
- Christopher Middleton (c. 1690–1770), Royal Navy officer and navigator
- Christopher Middleton (1926–2015), English poet
- Thomas Middleton (1580–1627), English poet and playwright
- Agnes Miegel (1879–1964), German writer and poet
- Josephine Miles (1911–1985), US poet and critic
- Jennifer Militello, US poet and professor
- Branko Miljković (1934–1961), Serbian poet
- Edna St. Vincent Millay (1892–1950), US lyric poet, playwright and feminist
- Alice Duer Miller (1874–1942), US writer and poet
- Grazyna Miller (1957–2009), Italian/Polish poet and translator
- Jace Miller, US poet
- Jane Miller (born 1949), US poet
- Joaquin Miller (1837–1913), US poet
- Leslie Adrienne Miller (born 1956), US poet
- Thomas Miller (1807–1874), English poet
- Vassar Miller (1924–1998), US writer and poet
- Spike Milligan (1918–2002), Irish comedian, poet and musician
- Czesław Miłosz (1911–2004), Polish poet; 1980 Nobel Prize in Literature
- John Milton (1608–1674), English poet and polemicist
- Sima Milutinović Sarajlija (1791–1847), Serbian adventurer, writer and poet
- Marijane Minaberri (1926–2017), French/Basque poet and radio broadcaster
- Robert Minhinnick (born 1952), Welsh poet, essayist and novelist
- Matthew Minicucci (born 1981), US poet and teacher
- Mir Taqi Mir (1725–1810), Indian poet in Urdu
- Frédéric Mistral (1830–1914) Nobel Prize-winning Occitan poet, writer, and lexicographer
- Gabriela Mistral (1889–1957), Nobel Prize-winning Chilean poet and feminist
- Adrian Mitchell (1932–2008), English poet, novelist and playwright
- Silas Weir Mitchell (1829–1914), US physician and writer
- Stephen Mitchell (born 1943), US poet, translator and anthologist
- Waddie Mitchell (born 1950), US poet
- Ndre Mjeda (1866–1937), Albanian Gheg poet
- Stanisław Młodożeniec (1895–1959), poet
- Anis Mojgani (born 1977), US spoken-word poet and visual artist
- Molière (Jean-Baptiste Poquelin) (1622–1673), French playwright
- Atukuri Molla (1440–1530), Indian Telugu poet
- Aja Monet, Black American poet
- Harold Monro (1879–1932), English poet
- Harriet Monroe (1860–1936), US scholar, critic and poet
- John Montague (1929–2016), Irish poet
- Charles Montagu, 1st Earl of Halifax (1661–1715), English poet and statesman
- Eugenio Montale (1896–1981), Italian poet, writer and translator; 1975 Nobel Prize in Literature
- Alexander Montgomerie (c. 1550–1598), Scottish Jacobean courtier and makar
- Alan Moore (born 1960), Irish writer and poet
- Marianne Moore (1887–1972), US poet and writer
- Merrill Moore (1903–1957), US psychiatrist and poet
- Thomas Moore (1779–1852), Irish poet, singer and songwriter
- Dom Moraes (1938–2004), Goan writer, poet and columnist
- Kelly Ana Morey (1968–2025), New Zealand novelist and poet
- Edwin Morgan (1920–2010), Scottish poet and translator
- J. O. Morgan (born 1978), Scottish poet
- John Morgan (1688–1733), Welsh clergyman, scholar and poet
- Christian Morgenstern (1871–1914), German author and poet
- Eduard Mörike (1804–1875), German poet
- William Morris (1834–1896), English writer, poet and designer
- Jim Morrison (1943–1971), US songwriter and poet
- Jan Andrzej Morsztyn (1621–1693), Polish poet
- Zbigniew Morsztyn (c. 1628–1689), Polish poet
- Valzhyna Mort (born 1981), Belarus poet
- Viggo Mortensen (born 1958), US poet, actor and musician
- Moschus (fl. 2nd c. BCE), Greek bucolic poet
- Howard Moss (1922–1987), US poet, dramatist and critic
- Andrew Motion (born 1952), English poet, novelist and biographer; UK Poet Laureate, 1999–2009
- Paul Scott Mowrer (1887–1971), US newspaper correspondent, Poet Laureate of New Hampshire, 1968–1971
- Enrique Moya (born 1958), Venezuelan poet, fiction writer and critic

=== Mu–My ===
- Micere Githae Mugo (1942–2023), Kenyan playwright, author and poet
- Erich Mühsam (1878–1934), German-Jewish essayist, poet and, playwright
- Edwin Muir (1887–1959), Scottish Orcadian poet, novelist and translator
- Paul Muldoon (born 1951), Irish poet
- Lale Müldür (born 1956), Turkish poet and writer
- Laura Mullen (born 1958), US poet
- Anthony Munday (1553–1633), English playwright and writer
- Jens Mungard (1885-1940), Frisian poet en linguist, wrote in Söl'ring (Sylt Frisian)
- George Murnu (1868–1957), Romanian archeologist, historian and poet
- Sheila Murphy (born 1951), US text and visual poet
- George Murray (born 1971), Canadian poet
- Joan Murray (born 1945), US poet, writer and playwright
- Les Murray (1938–2019), Australian poet, anthologist and critic
- Richard Murphy (1927–2018), Irish poet
- Susan Musgrave (born 1951), Canadian poet and children's writer
- Lukijan Mušicki (1777–1837), Serbian poet, prose writer and polyglot
- Nikola Musulin (fl. 19th c.), Serbian poet
- Togara Muzanenhamo (born 1975), Zimbabwean poet
- Christopher Mwashinga (born 1965), Tanzanian poet, author and Christian minister
- Lam Quang My (1944–2023), Vietnamese poet in Polish and Vietnamese

== N ==
- Vladimir Nabokov (1899–1977), Russian novelist and poet in Russian and English
- Daniel Naborowski (1573–1640), Polish poet
- Cecilia del Nacimiento (1570–1646), Spanish nun, mystic, writer, and poet
- Ágnes Nemes Nagy (1922–1991), Hungarian poet and translator
- Gáspár Nagy (1949–2007), Hungarian poet
- Lajos Parti Nagy (born 1953), Hungarian poet, playwright and critic
- László Nagy (1925–1978), Hungarian poet and translator
- Guru Nanak Dev (1469–1539), first Sikh Guru and Punjabi poet
- Nannaya (c. 11th c.), earliest known Telugu author
- Philip Nanton (living), Vincentian poet
- Adam Naruszewicz (1733–1796), Polish-Lithuanian poet, historian and dramatist
- Ogden Nash (1902–1971), US poet known for light verse
- Thomas Nashe (1567–1601), English playwright, poet and satirist
- Nasir Khusraw (1004–1088), Persian poet
- Imadaddin Nasimi (died c. 1417), Azerbaijani poet
- Momčilo Nastasijević (1894–1938), Serbian poet, novelist and dramatist
- Natsume Sōseki (1867–1916), Japanese novelist and poet
- Gellu Naum (1915–2001), Romanian poet, dramatist and children's writer
- Nedîm (c. 1681–1730), Ottoman poet
- John Neal (1793–1876), US writer, critic, activist and poet
- Henry Neele (1798–1828), English poet and scholar
- Walela Nehanda, Black American poet
- John Neihardt (1881–1973), US poet, historian and ethnographer
- Émile Nelligan (1879–1941), Quebec poet
- Marilyn Nelson (born 1946), US poet, translator and children's writer
- Howard Nemerov (1920–1991), US poet; U.S. Poet Laureate, 1963–1964 and 1988–1990
- István Péter Németh (born 1960), Hungarian poet and literary historian
- Condetto Nénékhaly-Camara (1930–1972), Guinean poet and playwright
- Jan Neruda (1834–1891), Czech journalist, writer and poet
- Pablo Neruda (1904–1973), Chilean poet and politician; Nobel Prize for Literature 1971
- Neşâtî (died 1674), Ottoman Sufi poet
- Henry John Newbolt (1862–1938), English historian and poet
- John Henry Newman (1801–1890), writer, poet and hymnist
- Aimee Nezhukumatathil (born 1974), Asian US poet
- Nguyễn Du (1766–1820), Vietnamese poet in ancient Chữ Nôm script
- B. P. Nichol (bpNichol, 1944–1988), Canadian poet
- Nicholas I of Montenegro (1841–1921), poet and king of Montenegro
- Grace Nichols (born 1950), Guyanese poet
- Norman Nicholson (1914–1987), English poet
- Lorine Niedecker (1903–1970), US poet
- Julian Ursyn Niemcewicz (1758–1841), Polish poet, playwright and statesman
- Friedrich Nietzsche (1844–1900), German philosopher, poet and philologist
- Millosh Gjergj Nikolla (Migjeni) (1911–1938), Albanian poet and writer
- Nizami Aruzi (1110–1161), Persian poets
- Nisami (1141–1209), Persian poet
- Attar of Nishapur (1145–1221), Persian poet
- Nishiyama Sōin (1605–1682), Japanese haikai poet
- Moeen Nizami (born 1965), Pakistani poet, scholar and writer
- Petar II Petrović-Njegoš (1813–1851), Serbian poet, playwright and prince-bishop
- Yamilka Noa (born 1980), Cuban–Costa Rican poet
- Gábor Nógrádi (born 1947), Hungarian poet, essayist and children's novelist
- Christopher Nolan (1965–2009), Irish poet and author
- Fan S. Noli (1882–1965), Albanian/US writer, diplomat and historian
- Olga Nolla (1938–2001), Puerto Rican poet, writer and professor
- Cees Nooteboom (1933–2026), Dutch poet, essayist and writer
- Henry Normal (born 1956), British poet, writer, film & TV producer
- Harry Northup (born 1940), US actor and poet
- Caroline Norton (1808–1877), English writer, feminist and reformer
- Cyprian Norwid (1821–1883), Polish poet, dramatist and artist
- Alice Notley (1945–2025), US poet
- Novalis (Friedrich von Hardenberg) (1772–1801), German poet and novelist
- Franciszek Nowicki (1864–1935), Polish poet and conservationist
- Alfred Noyes (1880–1958), English poet
- Oodgeroo Noonuccal (1920–1993), first Aboriginal Australian published poet
- Julia Nyberg (1784–1854), Swedish poet and songwriter
- Naomi Shihab Nye (born 1952), Palestinian-US poet, songwriter and novelist
- Robert Nye (1939–2016), English poet, novelist and children's writer
- Niyi Osundare (born 1947), Nigerian poet, dramatist and literary critic

== O ==
- Dositej Obradović (1742–1811), Serbian philosopher, writer and poet
- Sean O'Brien (born 1952), British poet, critic and playwright
- D. Michael O'Connor aka Damond Jiniya(Born 1974), North American singer, writer and poet
- Philip O'Connor (1916–1998), Anglo-French writer and poet
- Antoni Edward Odyniec (1804–1885), Polish poet
- Ron Offen (1930–2010), US poet, playwright and producer
- Dennis O'Driscoll (1954–2012), Irish poet
- Frank O'Hara (1926–1966), US writer, poet and art critic
- Hisashi Okuyama (born 1941), Japanese poet
- Porsha Olayiwola (born 1988), US poet
- Sharon Olds (born 1942), US poet
- Mary Oliver (1935–2015), US poet
- Charles Olson (1910–1970), US modernist poet
- Saishu Onoe (1876–1957), Japanese poet
- Onomacritus (c. 530–480 BCE), Attic poet, priest and seer
- George Oppen (1908–1984), US poet
- Artur Oppman (Or-Ot, 1867–1931), Polish poet
- Edward Otho Cresap Ord, II (1858–1923), US poet and painter
- Zaharije Orfelin (1726–1785), Serbian polymath and poet
- Władysław Orkan (1875–1930), Polish poet
- Peter Orlovsky (1933–2010), US poet and actor; partner of Allen Ginsberg
- Gregory Orr (born 1947), US poet
- Agnieszka Osiecka (1936–1997), Polish poet, writer and screenplay author
- Alice Oswald (born 1966), English poet
- Ouyang Xiu (1007–1072), Chinese Song dynasty historian, essayist and poet
- Ovid (43 BCE – 17 CE), Roman poet
- Wilfred Owen (1893–1918), English poet and soldier
- İsmet Özel (born 1944), Turkish poet and scholar

== P ==
=== Pa ===
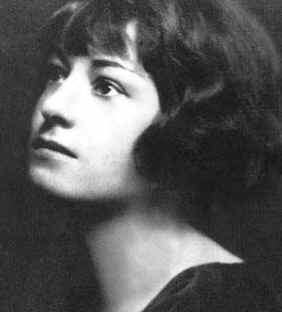
Dorothy Parker

- Ruth Padel (born 1946), English poet, author and critic
- Ron Padgett (born 1942), US poet, writer and translator
- Padmanābha (15th c.), Dingal (Old Gujarati) poet and historian
- Dan Pagis (1930–1986), Israeli poet and Holocaust survivor
- Grace Paley (1922–2007), US short story writer and poet
- Francis Turner Palgrave (1824–1897), English critic and poet
- Palladas (fl. 4th c.), Greek poet
- Julia Palmer, (fl. 17th c.), English dissenting poet
- Michael Palmer (born 1943), US poet and translator
- Alexandros Panagoulis (1939–1976), Greek politician and poet
- Sima Pandurović (1883–1960), Serbian poet
- Sumitranandan Pant (1900–1977), Indian poet in Hindi
- William Williams Pantycelyn (1717–1791), Welsh poet and hymnist in Welsh
- Rashmi Parekh (born 1976), Indian poet and computer scientist
- Park Yong-rae (1925–1980), Korean poet
- Andrew Park (1807–1863), Scottish poet
- Dorothy Parker (1893–1967), US poet, fiction writer and satirist
- Amy Parkinson (1855–1938), British-born Canadian poet
- Thomas Parnell (1679–1718), Irish poet and clergyman
- Nicanor Parra (1914–2018), Chilean mathematician and poet
- Henry Parrot (fl. 1600–1626), English epigrammatist
- Giovanni Pascoli (1855–1912), Italian poet
- Ámbar Past (born 1949), Mexican poet, visual artist
- Boris Pasternak (1890–1960), Russian poet, novelist and translator
- Leon Pasternak (1910–1969), Polish poet and satirist
- Benito Pastoriza Iyodo (1954–2022), Puerto Rican poet and fiction and literature writer
- Kenneth Patchen (1911–1972), US poet and novelist
- Ravji Patel (1939–1968), Indian poet
- Banjo Paterson (Andrew Barton Paterson) (1864–1941), Australian bush poet, journalist and author
- Don Paterson (born 1963), Scottish poet, writer and musician
- Coventry Patmore (1823–1896), English poet and critic
- Brian Patten (born 1946), English poet
- Lekhnath Paudyal (1885–1966), Nepalese poet
- Paul I, Prince Esterházy (1635–1713), Austro-Hungarian poet
- Cesare Pavese (1908–1950), Italian poet, novelist and critic
- Maria Pawlikowska-Jasnorzewska (1891–1945), Polish poet and dramatist
- Octavio Paz (1914–1998), Mexican writer, poet and diplomat

=== Pe–Pl ===
- Thomas Love Peacock (1785–1866), English poet and novelist
- Patrick Pearse (1879–1916), Irish poet and writer
- James Larkin Pearson (1879–1981), US poet and publisher
- Allasani Peddana (fl. 15th/16th cc.), Telugu poet
- Charles Péguy (1873–1914), French poet, essayist and editor
- Kathleen Peirce (born 1956), US poet
- Gabino Coria Peñaloza (1881–1975), Argentine poet and lyricist
- Sam Pereira (living), US poet
- Lucia Perillo (1958–2016), US poet
- Persius (34–62 CE), Roman poet and satirist of Etruscan origin
- Fernando Pessoa (1888–1935), Portuguese poet, philosopher and critic
- Lenrie Peters (1932–2009), Gambian surgeon, novelist, poet and educationist
- Robert Peters (1924–2014), US poet, scholar and playwright
- Pascale Petit (born 1953), French-Welsh poet and artist
- Petrarch (Francesco Petrarca) (1304–1374), Italian scholar and poet
- Kata Szidónia Petrőczy (1659–1708), Hungarian poet and prose writer
- Marine Petrossian (born 1960), Armenian poet, essayist and columnist
- Veljko Petrović (1884–1967), Serbian poet, prose writer and theorist
- Mirko Petrović-Njegoš (1820–1867), Serbian and Montenegrin poet, soldier and diplomat
- Mario Petrucci (born 1958), British poet, author, translator, scientist and ecologist of Italian origin
- Adaliza Cutter Phelps (1823–1852), US poet
- Ambrose Philips (1674–1749), English poet and politician
- Katherine Philips (1632–1664), Anglo-Welsh poet
- Savitribai Phule (1831–1897), Indian social reformer, educationalist, and poet from Maharashtra
- Pi Rixiu (c. 834–883), Tang dynasty poet
- Tom Pickard (born 1946), English poet and film maker
- Pindar (522–443 BCE), Theban lyric poet in Greek
- Robert Pinsky (born 1940), US poet, critic and translator; U.S. Poet Laureate, 1997–2000
- Ruth Pitter (1897–1992), English poet
- Christine de Pizan (c. 1365 – c. 1430), Venetian historian, poet and philosopher
- Sylvia Plath (1932–1963), US poet and novelist
- William Plomer (1903–1973), South African novelist, poet and editor in English

=== Po–Pu ===
- Jacek Podsiadło (born 1964), Polish poet, translator and essayist
- Edgar Allan Poe (1809–1849), US author, poet and critic
- Suman Pokhrel (born 1967), Nepalese poet, playwright and artist
- Wincenty Pol (1807–1872), Polish poet and geographer
- Margaret Steuart Pollard (1904–1996), English poet
- Edward Pollock (1823–1858), US poet
- John Pomfret (1667–1702), English poet and clergyman
- Marie Ponsot (1921–2019), US poet, critic and essayist
- Vasko Popa (1922–1991), Serbian poet of Romanian descent
- Alexander Pope (1688–1744), English poet
- Antonio Porchia (1885–1968), Italian Argentinian poet
- Judith Pordon (born 1954), US poet, writer and editor
- Jenny Lind Porter (1927–2020), Texas Poet Laureate (1964–1965)
- Peter Porter (1929–2010), Australian poet based in England
- Halina Poświatowska (1935–1967), Polish poet and writer
- Roma Potiki (born 1958), New Zealand poet and playwright
- Wacław Potocki (1621–1696), Polish poet and moralist
- Ezra Pound (1885–1972), US expatriate poet and critic
- Alishetty Prabhakar (1952–1993), Telugu poet
- Tapan Kumar Pradhan (born 1972), Indian poet, translator and activist
- Adélia Prado (born 1935), Brazilian writer and poet
- Winthrop Mackworth Praed (1802–1839), English politician and poet
- Jaishankar Prasad (1889–1937), Indian poet in Hindi
- E. J. Pratt (1882–1964), Canadian poet
- Petar Preradović (1818–1872), Croatian poet, writer and general
- France Prešeren (1800–1849), Carniolan Romantic poet
- Jacques Prévert (1900–1977), French poet and screenwriter
- Richard Price (born 1966), Scottish poet, novelist and translator
- Robert Priest (born 1951), English-born Canadian poet, children's author and singer-songwriter
- F. T. Prince (1912–2003), English poet and academic
- Matthew Prior (1664–1721), English poet and diplomat
- Bryan Procter (1787–1874), English poet
- Sextus Propertius (50 or 45–15 BCE), Latin elegiac poet
- Kevin Prufer (born 1969), US poet, academic and essayist
- J. H. Prynne (1936–2026), English poet
- Kazimierz Przerwa-Tetmajer (1865–1940), Polish poet, novelist and playwright
- Zenon Przesmycki (Miriam, 1861–1944), Polish poet, translator and critic
- Jeremi Przybora (1915–2004), Polish poet, writer and singer
- Luigi Pulci (1432–1484), Italian poet known for Morgante
- Lady Hester Pulter (1605–1678), English poet
- Ben Purkert (living), American poet, novelist and creative writing instructor
- Alexander Pushkin (1799–1837), Russian poet, novelist and playwright

== Q ==
- Nizar Qabbani (1923–1998), Syrian diplomat, poet and publisher
- Muhammad Tahir ul-Qadri (born 1951), Pakistani Sufi poet and scholar
- Sayyid Ahmedullah Qadri (1909–1985), Indian poet, writer and politician
- Aref Qazvini (1882–1934), Iranian poet, lyricist and musician, Persian poet
- Qatran Tabrizi (11th c.), Persian poet
- Qu Yuan (343–278 BCE), Chinese poet
- Francis Quarles (1592–1644), English Christian poet
- Salvatore Quasimodo (1901–1968), Italian author and poet; 1959 Nobel Prize in Literature

== R ==
=== Ra–Re ===
- Rabia Balkhi (10th c.), Persian poet, She is the first known female poet to write in Persian
- Jean Racine (1639–1699), French dramatist
- Branko Radičević (1824–1853), Serbian lyric poet
- Leetile Disang Raditladi (1910–1971), poet from Botswana
- Sam Ragan (1915–1996), US poet, journalist and writer
- Shamsur Rahman (1929–2006), Bangladeshi poet and columnist
- Craig Raine (born 1944), English poet
- Kathleen Raine (1908–2003), English poet, critic and scholar
- Samina Raja (born 1961), Pakistani poet, writer and broadcaster
- Milan Rakić (1876–1938), Serbian poet
- Carl Rakosi (1903–2004), US Objectivist poet
- Martin Rakovský (c. 1535–1579), Hungarian poet and scholar
- Zsuzsa Rakovszky (born 1950), Hungarian poet and translator
- Maraea Rakuraku (living), New Zealand Māori poet, playwright and short story writer
- Sir Walter Raleigh (c. 1554–1618), English writer, poet and explorer
- Tenali Rama (16th c., CE), Telugu poet
- Ayyalaraju Ramabhadrudu (16th c., CE), Telugu poet
- Ramarajabhushanudu (mid 16th c. CE), Telugu poet and musician
- Guru Ram Das (1534–1581), Sikh guru and Punjabi poet
- Simón Darío Ramírez (1930–1992), Venezuelan poet
- Allan Ramsay (1686–1758), Scottish poet, playwright and publisher
- Dudley Randall (1914–2000), African-US poet and publisher
- Thomas Randolph (1605–1635), English poet and dramatist
- John Crowe Ransom (1888–1974), US poet, essayist and editor
- Addepalli Ramamohana Rao (1936–2016), Telugu poet and literary critic
- Ágnes Rapai (born 1952), Hungarian poet, writer and translator
- Noon Meem Rashid (1910–1975), Pakistani poet writing in Urdu
- Stephen Ratcliffe (born 1948), US poet and critic
- Dahlia Ravikovitch (1936–2005), Israeli poet and translator
- Tom Raworth (1938–2017), British poet and visual artist
- Herbert Read (1893–1968), English anarchist, poet and arts critic
- Peter Reading (1946–2011), English poet
- Angela Readman (born 1973), English poet
- James Reaney (1926–2008), Canadian poet, playwright and professor
- Malliya Rechana (mid-10th c. CE), Telugu poet
- Peter Redgrove (1932–2003), English poet
- Beatrice Redpath (1886–1937), Canadian poet and short story writer
- Henry Reed (1914–1986), English poet, translator and radio dramatist
- Ishmael Reed (born 1938), US poet, playwright and novelist
- Ennis Rees (1925–2009), US poet, professor and translator
- James Reeves (1909–1978), English poet, children's writer and writer on song
- Abraham Regelson (1896–1981), Israeli Hebrew poet, author and children's author
- Christopher Reid (born 1949), Hong Kong-born English poet, essayist and cartoonist
- James Reiss (1941–2016), US poet
- Mikołaj Rej (1505–1569), Polish poet and prose writer
- Robert Rendall (1898–1967), Orkney Scottish poet and amateur naturalist
- Pierre Reverdy (1889–1960), French poet of Surrealism, Dadaism and Cubism
- Jacobus Revius (born Jakob Reefsen) (1586–1658), Dutch poet, theologian and church historian
- Kenneth Rexroth (1905–1982), US poet, translator and critical essayist
- Sydor Rey (1908–1979), Polish poet and novelist
- Charles Reznikoff (1894–1976), US Objectivist poet
- Raees Warsi (born 1963), Pakistani poet, writer and lyricist writing in Urdu

=== Ri–Ry ===
- Francisco Granizo Ribadeneira (1925–2009), Ecuadorian poet
- Anne Rice (1941–2021), US fiction writer
- Stan Rice (1943–2002), US poet and artist; husband of Anne Rice
- Adrienne Rich (1929–2012), US poet, essayist and feminist
- John Richardson (1817–1886), English Lake District poet
- Edgell Rickword (1898–1982), English poet, critic and journalist
- Lola Ridge (1873–1941), Irish-born US anarchist poet and editor
- Laura Riding (1901–1981), US poet, critic and novelist
- Anne Ridler (1912–2001), English poet and editor
- James Whitcomb Riley (1849–1916), US writer and poet
- John Riley (1937–1978), English poet of British Poetry Revival
- Rainer Maria Rilke (1875–1926), Bohemian-Austrian poet
- Gopal Prasad Rimal (1918–1973), Nepali poet and playwright
- Arthur Rimbaud (1854–1891), French symbolist poet of Decadent movement
- Alberto Ríos (born 1952), US poet and professor
- Khawar Rizvi (1938–1981), Pakistani poet and scholar in Urdu and Persian
- Emma Roberts (1794–1840), English travel writer and poet
- Michael Roberts (1902–1948), English poet, writer and editor
- Edwin Arlington Robinson (1869–1935), US poet
- Mary Robinson (1757–1800), English poet and novelist
- Peter Robinson (born 1953), English poet
- Roland Robinson (1912–1992), Australian poet and writer
- Georges Rodenbach (1855–1898), Belgian Symbolist poet and novelist
- W R Rodgers (1909–1969), Northern Irish poet, essayist and Presbyterian minister
- José Luis Rodríguez Pittí (born 1971), Panamanian poet and artist
- Theodore Roethke (1908–1963), US poet
- Samuel Rogers (1763–1855), English poet
- Rognvald Kali Kolsson (c. 1103–1158), Earl of Orkney and saint
- Matthew Rohrer (born 1970), US poet
- Géza Röhrig (born 1967), Hungarian poet and actor
- Radoslav Rochallyi (born 1980), Slovak writer
- David Romtvedt (living), US poet
- Pierre de Ronsard (1524–1585), French poet
- Peter Rosegger (1843–1918), Austrian poet
- Franklin Rosemont (1943–2009), US poet, artist and co-founder of Chicago Surrealist Group
- Penelope Rosemont (born 1942), US poet, writer and co-founder of Chicago Surrealist Group
- Michael Rosen (born 1946), UK children's poet and former children's poet laureate
- Isaac Rosenberg (1890–1918), English poet
- Susan Rosenbloom (1958–2015) UK choreographer, artistic director, teacher and poet
- Barbara Rosiek (1959–2020), Polish poet, writer and psychologist
- Alan Ross (1922–2001), English poet, cricket writer and editor
- Christina Rossetti (1830–1894), English poet
- Dante Gabriel Rossetti (1828–1882), English poet, illustrator and painter
- Andrus Rõuk (born 1957), Estonian artist and poet
- Raymond Roussel (1877–1933), French poet, novelist and playwright
- Nicholas Rowe (1674–1718), English dramatist, poet and miscellanist; UK Poet Laureate, 1715
- Samuel Rowlands (c. 1573–1630), English poet and pamphleteer
- Susanna Roxman (1946–2015), English poet born in Sweden
- Istvan Rozanich (1912–1984), Hungarian poet exiled in Venezuela
- Tadeusz Różewicz (1921–2014), Polish poet and writer
- Ljubivoje Ršumović (born 1939), Serbian poet
- Friedrich Rückert (1788–1866), German poet, translator and academic
- Rudaki (858 – 940/41), Persian poet
- Muriel Rukeyser (1913–1980), US poet and political activist
- Zygmunt Rumel (1915–1943), Polish poet and partisan
- Jalāl ad-Dīn Muhammad Balkhi Rumi (1207–1273), Persian Muslim poet, jurist and Sufi mystic
- Paul-Eerik Rummo (born 1942), Estonian poet
- Johan Ludvig Runeberg (1804–1877), Finnish poet in Swedish
- Nipsey Russell (1918–2005), US poet and comedian
- Kay Ryan (1945-), poet and educator; U.S. Poet Laureate, 2008–2010
- Lucjan Rydel (1870–1918), Polish poet and playwright
- Jarosław Marek Rymkiewicz (1935–2022), Polish poet, essayist and dramatist
- Ryōkan (1758–1831), Japanese calligrapher and poet

== S ==
=== Sa–Se ===
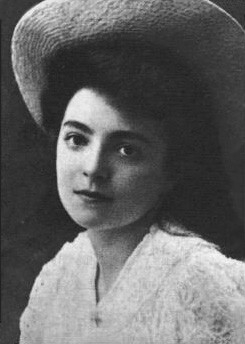
Nelly Sachs

- Sanai (1080–1131), Persian poet
- Umberto Saba (1883–1957), Italian poet and novelist
- Jaime Sabines (1926–1999), Mexican poet
- Nelly Sachs (1891–1970), Jewish German poet and playwright; 1966 Nobel Prize in Literature
- Charles Sackville, 6th Earl of Dorset and 1st Earl of Middlesex (1638–1706), English poet and courtier
- Thomas Sackville, 1st Earl of Dorset (1536–1608), English statesman, poet and dramatist
- Vita Sackville-West (1892–1962), English author, poet and gardener
- Saib Tabrizi (1592–1676), Persian poets
- Saʿdī Shīrāzī (1184–1283/1291), Persian poet
- Benjamin Alire Sáenz (born 1954), US poet, novelist and children's writer
- Ali Ahmad Said (Adunis) (born 1930), Syrian poet, essayist and translator
- Mellin de Saint-Gelais (c. 1491–1558), French Renaissance poet
- Benjamin Saltman (c.1927-1999), American Jewish poet.
- Akim Samar (1916–1943), Soviet poet and novelist seen as first Nanai language writer
- Sonia Sanchez (born 1934), African-US poet associated with Black Arts Movement
- Michal Šanda (born 1965), Czech writer and poet
- Carl Sandburg (1878–1967), US poet, writer and editor; three Pulitzer Prizes
- Jacopo Sannazaro (1458–1530), Italian poet, humanist and epigrammist from Naples
- Ann Sansom, English poet and writing tutor
- Aleksa Šantić (1868–1924), Bosnian Serb poet
- Taneda Santōka (1882–1940), Japanese free verse haiku poet
- Genrikh Sapgir (1928–1999), Russian poet and fiction writer
- Sappho (c. 630–612 – c. 570 BCE), ancient Greek lyric poet from Lesbos
- Jaydeep Sarangi (born 1973), Indian poet in English
- Maciej Kazimierz Sarbiewski (1595–1640), Polish poet in Latin
- William Saroyan (1908–1981), US author of Armenian descent
- Siegfried Sassoon (1886–1967), English war poet
- Subagio Sastrowardoyo (1924–1995), Indonesian poet, fiction writer and literary critic
- Satsvarupa Das Goswami (born 1939), US poet and artist
- William Saunders (1806–1851), Welsh poet in Welsh
- Mary Stebbins Savage (1850-1915), American poet and writer
- Richard Savage (c. 1697–1743), English poet
- Leslie Scalapino (1944–2010), US poet, writer and playwright
- Maurice Scève (c. 1500–1564), French poet
- Hermann Georg Scheffauer (1876–1927), US poet, architect and fiction writer
- Georges Schehadé (1905–1989), Lebanese playwright and poet in French
- Friedrich Schiller (1759–1805), German poet, philosopher and playwright
- Arno Schmidt (1914–1979), German author and translator
- Dennis Schmitz (1937–2019), US poet
- Steven P. Schneider (living), US poet, critic, and university professor
- Arthur Schnitzler (1862–1931), Austrian author and dramatist
- Anton Schosser (1801–1849), Austrian dialect poet
- Johanna Schouten-Elsenhout (1910–1992), Surinamese poet and community leader, wrote in Sranan Tongo and English
- Philip Schultz (born 1945), US poet
- James Schuyler (1923–1991), US poet
- Delmore Schwartz (1913–1966), US poet and fiction writer
- Alexander Scott (c. 1520–1582/1583), Scottish poet
- Alexander Scott (1920–1989), Scottish poet and playwright
- Frederick George Scott (1861–1944), Canadian poet and author, father of F. R. Scott
- F. R. Scott (1899–1985), Canadian poet, academic and constitutional expert
- Tom Scott (1918–1995), Scottish poet
- Sir Walter Scott (1771–1832), Scottish historical novelist, playwright and poet
- Gil Scott-Heron (1949–2011), US soul musician and jazz poet
- George Bazeley Scurfield (1920–1991), English poet, novelist, author and politician
- Peter Seaton (1942–2010), US Language poet
- Władysław Sebyła (1902–1940), Polish poet
- Johannes Secundus (1511–1536), Dutch Neo-Latin poet
- Sir Charles Sedley, 5th Baronet (1639–1701), English poet, wit and dramatist
- George Seferis (pen name of Geōrgios Seferiádēs) (1900–1971), Greek poet and Nobel laureate
- Hugh Seidman (1940–2023), US poet
- Rebecca Seiferle (living), US poet
- Jaroslav Seifert (1901–1986), Czech writer, poet and journalist; 1984 Nobel Prize in Literature
- Lasana M. Sekou (born 1959), Sint Maarten poet, essayist and journalist
- Semonides of Amorgos (c. 7th c. BCE), Greek iambic and elegiac poet
- Léopold Sédar Senghor (1906–2001), Senegalese poet, politician and cultural theorist
- Robert W. Service (1874–1958), Scottish-Canadian poet
- Vikram Seth (born 1952), Indian author and poet
- Anne Sexton (1928–1974), US poet; Confessional poetry, 1967 Pulitzer Prize for Poetry
- John W. Sexton (born 1958), Irish poet, fiction and children's writer

=== Sh–Sj ===
- Tendai M. Shaba (born 1989), Malawian poet
- Thomas Shadwell (c. 1642–1692), English poet and playwright; UK Poet Laureate, 1689–1692
- Muhammad Quli Qutb Shah (1565–1612), sultan of Golkonda and poet in Persian, Telugu and Urdu
- Riaz Ahmed Gohar Shahi (1941–2001), Pakistani Sufi spiritual leader, poet and author
- Abdulrahman Adel Al-Shammari (born 1974), Saudi poet
- Mohammad-Hossein Shahriar (1906–1988) Iranian poet (both Persian and Azerbaijani poet)
- Turan Bahrami Shahriari (1931-2024) Iranian poet and lawyer
- Parveen Shakir (1952–1994), Pakistani poet, teacher and civil servant of the government of Pakistan
- William Shakespeare (c. 1564–1616), English poet and playwright
- Tupac Shakur (1971–1996), US rapper, actor and black activist
- Otep Shamaya (born 1979), US singer-songwriter, actress and poet
- Ahmad Shamlou (1925–2000), Iranian poet, Persian poet
- Paata Shamugia (born 1983), Georgian poet
- Ntozake Shange (1948–2018), US playwright and poet
- Jon Beck Shank (1919–1977), US poet and teacher
- Jo Shapcott (born 1953), English poet, editor and lecturer
- Karl Shapiro (1913–2000), US poet; U.S. Poet Laureate, 1946–1947
- Sanu Sharma Nepalese Australian novelist, writer, poet, lyricist
- Brenda Shaughnessy (born 1970), US poet
- Luci Shaw (born 1928), English-born Christian poet
- Muhannad Al-Shawi (born 1974), Iraqi poet
- Percy Bysshe Shelley (1792–1822), English Romantic poet
- William Shenstone (1714–1763), English poet
- Bhupi Sherchan (1935–1989), Nepalese poet
- Taras Shevchenko (1814–1861), Ukrainian poet and artist
- Mustafa Sheykhoghlu (1340/1341 – 1410), Turkish poet and translator
- Masaoka Shiki (1867–1902), Japanese author, poet and literary critic
- Hovhannes Shiraz (1915–1984), Armenian poet
- James Shirley (1596–1666), English dramatist
- Avraham Shlonsky (1900–1973), Israeli poet and editor
- Sir Philip Sidney (1554–1586), English poet, courtier and soldier
- Eli Siegel (1902–1978), Latvian-US poet, critic and philosopher
- Robert Siegel (1939–2012), US poet and novelist
- August Silberstein (1827–1900), Austro-Hungarian poet and writer in German
- Jon Silkin (1930–1997), English poet
- Hilda Siller (1861–1945), American poet and short story writer
- Ron Silliman (born 1946), US poet of Language poetry
- Shel Silverstein (1930–1999), US poet, musician and children's writer
- Simeon Simev (born 1949), Macedonian poet, essayist and journalist
- Charles Simic (1938–2023), Serbian-US poet; U.S. Poet Laureate, 2007–2008
- Simonides of Ceos (c. 556–468 BCE), Greek lyric poet, born at Ioulis on Kea
- Antun Branko Šimić (1898–1925), Croatian poet
- Louis Simpson (1923–2012), Jamaican poet
- Bennie Lee Sinclair (1939–2000), US poet, novelist and story writer; South Carolina Poet Laureate, 1986–2000
- Burns Singer (1928–1964), US poet raised in Scotland
- Marilyn Singer (born 1948), US children's writer and poet
- Ervin Šinko (1898–1967), Croatian-Hungarian poet and prose writer
- Lemn Sissay (born 1967), English author and broadcaster
- Charles Hubert Sisson (1914–2003), English poet and translator
- Edith Sitwell (1887–1964), English poet and critic; eldest of three literary Sitwells
- Sjón (born 1962), Icelandic author and poet

=== Sk–Sp ===
- Egill Skallagrímsson (c. 910 – c. 990), Viking Age poet, warrior and farmer, protagonist of Egil's Saga
- John Skelton (1460–1529), English poet
- Sasha Skenderija (born 1968), Bosnian-US poet
- Ed Skoog (born 1971), US poet
- Jan Stanisław Skorupski (born 1938), Polish poet, essayist and esperantist
- Pencho Slaveykov (1866–1912), Bulgarian poet
- Petko Slaveykov (1827–1895), Bulgarian poet, publicist and folklorist
- Kenneth Slessor (1901–1971), Australian poet and journalist
- Anton Martin Slomšek (1800–1862), Slovene bishop, author and culture advocate
- Antoni Słonimski (1895–1976), Polish poet, playwright and artist
- Michaël Slory (1935–2018), Surinamese poet in Sranan Tongo, also in English, Dutch and Spanish
- Juliusz Słowacki (1809–1849), Polish Romantic poet
- Boris Slutsky (1919–1986), Russian poet
- Christopher Smart (1722–1771), English poet and playwright
- Hristo Smirnenski (1898–1923), Bulgarian poet and writer
- Bruce Smith (born 1946), US poet
- Charlotte Smith (1749–1806), English Romantic poet and novelist
- Clark Ashton Smith (1893–1961), US poet, sculptor and author
- Margaret Smith (born 1958), US poet, musician and artist
- Patti Smith (born 1946), US singer-songwriter, poet and visual artist
- Stevie Smith (1902–1971), English poet and novelist
- Sydney Goodsir Smith (1915–1975), Scottish poet in Braid Scots
- Tracy K. Smith (born 1972), US poet; U.S. Poet Laureate, 2017–2019
- William Jay Smith (1918–2015), US poet; U.S. Poet Laureate, 1968–1970
- Tobias Smollett (1721–1771), Scottish poet and author
- William De Witt Snodgrass (1926–2009), US poet
- Gary Snyder (born 1930), US poet, essayist and environmentalist
- Edith Södergran (1892–1923), Finnish poet in Swedish
- Sōgi (1421–1502), Japanese waka and renga poet
- David Solway (born 1941), Canadian poet, educational theorist and travel writer
- Marie-Ange Somdah (born 1959), Burkinabe poet and writer
- William Somervile (1675–1742), English poet
- Sophocles (c. 496–406 BCE), Athenian tragedian
- Charles Sorley (1895–1915), English war poet
- Gary Soto (born 1952), Mexican-US author and poet
- William Soutar (1898–1943), Scottish poet in English and Braid Scots
- Caroline Anne Southey (1786–1854), English poet
- Robert Southey (1774–1843), English Romantic poet and UK Poet Laureate, 1813–1843
- Anne Southwell (1574-1636), English poet
- Robert Southwell (1561–1595), English Catholic Jesuit priest, poet and clandestine missionary
- Wole Soyinka (born 1934), Nigerian poet and playwright and poet; 1986 Nobel Prize in Literature
- Bernard Spencer (1909–1963), English poet, translator and editor
- Stephen Spender (1909–1995), English poet, novelist, and essayist; U.S. Poet Laureate, 1965–1966
- Edmund Spenser (1552–1599), English poet

=== St–Sz ===
- Edward Stachura (1937–1979), poet, prose writer and translator
- Leopold Staff (1878–1957), Polish poet
- William Stafford (1914–1993), US poet and pacifist; U.S. Poet Laureate 1970–1971
- A. E. Stallings (born 1968), US poet and translator
- Jon Stallworthy (1935–2014), English academic, poet and literary critic
- Nichita Stănescu (1933–1983), Romanian poet
- Ann Stanford (1916–1987), US poet
- Anna Stanisławska (1651–1701), Polish poet
- George Starbuck (1931–1996), US neo-Formalist poet
- Andrzej Stasiuk (born 1960), Polish poet and novelist
- Statius (c. 45–96, CE), Roman poet
- Christian Karlson Stead, ONZ, CBE (born 1932), New Zealand novelist, poet and critic
- Stesichorus (c. 640–555 BCE), Greek lyric poet
- Joseph Stefan (1835–1893), Carinthian Slovenes physicist, mathematician and poet in Austria
- Stefan Stefanović (1807–1828), Serbian poet
- Gertrude Stein (1874–1946), US modernist in prose and poetry
- Eric Stenbock (1860–1895), Baltic German poet and writer of fantastic fiction
- Mattie Stepanek (1990–2004), US poet and advocate
- Shelby Stephenson (born 1938), US poet, North Carolina Poet Laureate, 2014–2018
- George Stepney (1663–1707), English poet and diplomat
- George Sterling (1869–1926), US poet and playwright, author of "A Wine of Wizardry"
- Anatol Stern (1899–1968), Polish poet and art critic
- Gerald Stern (1925–2022), US poet
- Marinko Stevanović (born 1961), Bosnian poet
- C. J. Stevens (1927–2021), US writer of poetry, fiction and biography
- Wallace Stevens (1880–1955), US modernist poet
- Robert Louis Stevenson (1850–1894), Scottish novelist, poet and travel writer
- Margo Taft Stever, US poet
- Trumbull Stickney (1874–1904), US classical scholar and poet
- James Still (1906–2001), US poet, novelist and folklorist
- Milica Stojadinović-Srpkinja (1828–1878), Serbian poet
- Dejan Stojanović (born 1959), Serbian-US poet, writer and philosopher
- Donna J. Stone (1933–1994), US poet and philanthropist
- Ruth Stone (1915–2011), US poet, author and teacher
- Lisa Gluskin Stonestreet (born 1968), US poet and editor
- Edward Storer (1880–1944), English writer, translator and poet linked with Imagism
- Theodor Storm (1817–1888), German writer and poet
- Alfonsina Storni (1892–1938), Latin US Modernist poet
- Mark Strand (1934–2014), Canadian-born US poet, essayist and translator; U.S. Poet Laureate, 1990–1991
- Botho Strauß (born 1944), German playwright, poet and novelist
- Joseph Stroud (born 1943), US poet
- Jesse Stuart (1907–1984), US writer of fiction and poetry
- Jacquie Sturm (born Te Kare Papuni) (1927–2009), New Zealand poet, fiction writer and librarian

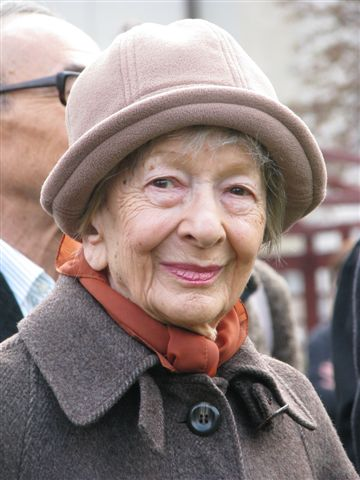
Wisława Szymborska

- Su Shi (1037–1101), Song dynasty writer, poet and artist
- Su Xiaoxiao (died c. 501 CE), courtesan and poet under Southern Qi dynasty
- Allamraju Subrahmanyakavi (1831–1892), Indian Telugu poet
- Sir John Suckling (1609–1642), English poet and inventor of card game cribbage
- Suleiman the Magnificent (1494–1566), Islamic poet and Ottoman ruler
- Robert Sullivan (born 1967), New Zealand Māori poet, academic and editor
- Jovan Sundečić (1825–1900), Serbian poet
- Cemal Süreya (1931–1990), Turkish poet and writer
- Abhi Subedi (born 1945), Nepalese poet, playwright and critic
- Pingali Surana (16th c.), Telugu poet
- Robert Sward (1933–2022), US and Canadian poet and novelist
- Cole Swensen (born 1955), US poet, translator and copywriter
- Karen Swenson (born 1936), US poet
- May Swenson (1913–1989), US poet and playwright
- Marcin Świetlicki (born 1961), Polish poet, prose writer and musician
- Jonathan Swift (1667–1745), Anglo-Irish satirist, essayist and pamphleteer
- Algernon Charles Swinburne (1837–1909), English poet, playwright and novelist
- Anna Świrszczyńska (also Anna Swir) (1909–1984), Polish poet
- Joshua Sylvester (1563–1618), English poet
- Arthur William Symons (1865–1945), English poet, critic and editor
- John Millington Synge (1871–1909), Irish dramatist, poet and folklore collector
- Władysław Syrokomla (1823–1862), Polish poet and translator in Russian Empire
- Lőrinc Szabó (1900–1957), Hungarian poet and literary translator
- Fruzina Szalay (1864–1926), Hungarian poet and translator
- Mikołaj Sęp Szarzyński (c. 1550 – c. 1581), poet in Polish and Latin
- Arthur Sze (born 1950), Chinese US poet
- Bertalan Szemere (1812–1869), Hungarian poet and politician
- Gyula Szentessy (1870–1905), Hungarian poet
- George Szirtes (born 1948), Hungary-born British poet and translator
- Janusz Szpotański (1929–2001), Polish poet, satirist and translator
- Włodzimierz Szymanowicz (1946–1967), Polish poet and painter
- Wisława Szymborska (1923–2012), Polish poet, essayist and translator; 1996 Nobel Prize in Literature
- Szymon Szymonowic (1558–1629), Polish poet

== T ==
=== Ta–Te ===
- Dragutin Tadijanović (1905–1907), Croatian poet
- Rabindranath Tagore (1861–1941), Bengali polymath; 1913 Nobel Prize in Literature
- Judit Dukai Takách (Malvina, 1795–1836), Hungarian poet
- Bogi Takács (born 1983), Hungarian poet and fiction writer in US
- Kyoshi Takahama (1874–1959), Japanese poet
- Taliesin (fl. 6th c.), British poet of post-Roman period
- Meary James Thurairajah Tambimuttu (1915–1983), Tamil poet, editor and critic
- Maxim Tank (1912–1996), Belarus poet
- Tao Qian (365–427), Chinese poet
- Kim Taplin (1943-2024), English poet
- Jovica Tasevski-Eternijan (born 1976), Macedonian poet, essayist and literary critic
- Alain Tasso (born 1962), Franco-Lebanese poet, painter and critic
- Torquato Tasso (1544–1595), Italian poet
- Allen Tate (1899–1979), US poet, essayist and commentator; U.S. Poet Laureate, 1943–1944
- James Tate (1943–2015), US poet
- Emma Tatham (1829–1855), English poet
- Tracey Tawhiao (born 1967), New Zealand Maori poet and artist
- Apirana Taylor (born 1955), New Zealand poet, novelist and storyteller
- Edward Taylor (c. 1642–1729), colonial American poet, physician and pastor
- Emily Taylor (1795–1872), English poet and children's writer
- Henry Taylor (1800–1886), English poet and dramatist
- Henry S. Taylor (1942–2024), US poet
- Jane Taylor (1783–1824), English poet and novelist
- Sara Teasdale (1884–1933), US lyric poet
- Guru Tegh Bahadur (1621–1675), Sikh Guru and Punjabi poet
- Telesilla (fl. 510 BCE), Greek poet
- Raipiyel Tennakoon (1899–1965), Sri Lankan poet
- William Tennant (1784–1848), Scottish scholar and poet
- Alfred, Lord Tennyson (1809–1892), English poet; UK Poet Laureate, 1850–1892
- Vahan Terian (1885–1920), Armenian poet, lyricist and public activist
- Elaine Terranova (born 1939), US poet
- Lucy Terry (c. 1730–1821), African-US poet; author of oldest known work by African American
- A. S. J. Tessimond (1902–1962), English poet
- Neyzen Tevfik (1879–1953), Turkish poet, satirist and performer

=== Th–To ===
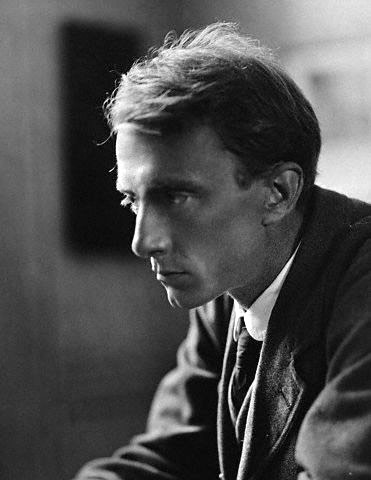
Edward Thomas

- Kálmán Thaly (1839–1909), Hungarian poet and politician
- Ernest Thayer (1863–1940), US writer and poet
- John Thelwall (1764–1834), English poet and essayist
- Theocritus (fl. 3rd c. BCE), Greek bucolic poet
- Antony Theodore (born 1954), German pastor poet and educator
- Jan Theuninck (born 1954), Belgian painter and poet
- Nandi Thimmana (15th – 16th cc.), Telugu poet
- Thiruvalluvar (around 31 BCE), Tamil poet and philosopher
- Dylan Thomas (1914–1953), Welsh poet and writer in English
- Edward Thomas (1878–1917), Welsh poet and essayist in English
- Lorenzo Thomas (1944–2005), US poet and critic
- R. S. Thomas (1913–2000), Welsh poet in English and Anglican priest
- John Thompson (1938–1976), English-born Canadian poet
- John Reuben Thompson (1823–1873), US poet, journalist, editor and publisher
- Francis Thompson (1859–1907), English poet and ascetic
- James Thomson (1700–1748), Scottish poet and playwright
- James Thomson (Bysshe Vanolis, 1834–1882), Scottish Victorian poet
- Henry David Thoreau (1817–1862), US author, poet and philosopher
- Georg Thurmair (1909–1984), German poet and hymn writer
- Maria Luise Thurmair (1918–2005), German poet and hymn writer
- Joseph Thurston (1704–1732), English poet
- Anthony Thwaite (1930–2021), English poet and writer
- Tibullus (c. 54–19 BCE), Latin poet and elegy writer
- Chidiock Tichborne (1558–1586), English conspirator and poet
- Thomas Tickell (1685–1740), English poet and man of letters
- Ludwig Tieck (1773–1853), German poet, translator, editor and critic
- Tikkana (1205–1288), Telugu poet, translator of Mahabharata
- Gary Tillery (born 1947), US writer, poet and artist
- Abdillahi Suldaan Mohammed Timacade (1920–1973), Somali poet
- Eugeniusz Tkaczyszyn-Dycki (born 1962), Polish poet
- Nick Toczek (born 1950), English writer, poet and broadcaster
- Melvin B. Tolson (1898–1966), US Modernist poet, educator and columnist
- Charles Tomlinson (1927–2015), English poet and translator
- Jean Toomer (1894–1967), US poet and novelist
- Mihály Tompa (1819–1868), Hungarian poet and pastor
- Álvaro Torres-Calderón (born 1975), Peruvian poet
- Kálmán Tóth (1831–1881), Hungarian poet
- Krisztina Tóth (born 1967), Hungarian poet and translator
- Sándor Tóth (1939–2019), Hungarian poet and journalist
- Cyril Tourneur (1575–1626), English poetic dramatist
- Ann Townsend (born 1962), US poet and essayist

=== Tr–Tz ===
- Thomas Traherne (1636/1637–1674), English poet, clergyman and religious writer
- Georg Trakl (1887–1914), Austrian Expressionist poet
- Chrysanthemum Tran, Vietnamese-American poet
- Tomas Tranströmer (1931–2015), Swedish poet, 2011 Nobel Prize in Literature
- Elizabeth Treadwell (born 1967), US poet
- Roland Michel Tremblay (born 1972), French Canadian writer and poet
- Natasha Trethewey (1966-), American poet; U.S. Poet Laureate 2012–2014
- William S. Tribell (born 1977), US poet
- Duško Trifunović (1933–2006), Serbian poet and writer
- Calvin Trillin (born 1935), US humorist, poet and novelist
- Geeta Tripathee (born 1972), Nepali poet, lyricist, essayist and scholar
- Suryakant Tripathi (1896–1961), Indian poet in Hindi and Bengali
- Quincy Troupe (born 1939), US poet, editor and professor
- Tõnu Trubetsky (Tony Blackplait) (born 1963), Estonian glam punk musician and poet
- Marina Tsvetaeva (1892–1941), Russian/Soviet poet
- Kurt Tucholsky (1890–1935), German-Jewish journalist, satirist and writer
- Charlotte Maria Tucker (1821–1893), English poet and religious writer
- Tulsidas (1497/1532–1623), Hindu poet-saint, reformer and philosopher
- Hovhannes Tumanyan (1869–1923), Armenian writer and public activist
- Ğabdulla Tuqay (1886–1913), Tatar poet, critic and publisher
- George Turberville (c. 1540 – c. 1597), English poet
- Charles Tennyson Turner (1808–1879), English poet, elder brother of Alfred Tennyson
- Julian Turner (born 1955), English poet and mental health worker
- Thomas Tusser (1524–1580), English poet and farmer
- Hone Tuwhare (1922–2008), New Zealand Māori poet
- Julian Tuwim (1894–1953), Polish poet of Jewish descent
- Jan Twardowski (1915–2006), Polish poet and priest
- Chase Twichell (born 1950), US poet, professor and publisher
- Pontus de Tyard (c. 1521–1605), French poet and priest
- Fyodor Tyutchev (1803–1873), Russian Romantic poet
- Tristan Tzara (1896–1963), Romanian and French avant-garde poet and performance artist

== U ==
- Kornel Ujejski (1823–1897), Polish poet and political writer
- Tin Ujević (1891–1955), Croatian poet
- Erzsi Újvári (1899–1940), Hungarian poet
- Laura Ulewicz (1930–2007), US beat poet
- Kavisekhara Dr Umar Alisha (1885–1945), Telugu poet
- Miguel de Unamuno (1864–1936), Spanish essayist, novelist and poet
- Giuseppe Ungaretti (1888–1970), Italian poet, critic and academic
- Abul Qasim Hasan Unsuri Balkhi (died 1039/1040) Persian poet
- Louis Untermeyer (1885–1977), US poet, anthologist and critic; U.S. Poet Laureate 1961–1962
- John Updike (1932–2009), US novelist, poet and critic
- Allen Upward (1863–1926), Irish-English Imagist poet and teacher
- Uthman Mukhtari (1074–1118), Persian poet
- Amy Uyematsu (1947–2023), Japanese-US poet

== V ==
- János Vajda (1827–1897), Hungarian poet and journalist
- Paul Valéry (1871–1945), French Symbolist author and poet
- Alfonso Vallejo (1943–2021), Spanish artist, playwright and poet
- César Vallejo (1892–1938), Peruvian poet, writer and playwright
- Jean-Pierre Vallotton (born 1955), French-Swiss poet and writer
- Valmiki poet harbinger in Sanskrit literature
- Cor van den Heuvel (1931–2024), US haiku poet, editor and archivist
- Mona Van Duyn (1921–2004), US poet; U.S. Poet Laureate, 1992–1993
- Lin Van Hek (born 1944), Australian poet, writer and fashion designer
- Nikola Vaptsarov (1909–1942), Bulgarian poet
- Varand (born 1954), Armenian poet, writer and professor of literature
- Mahadevi Varma (1907–1987), Indian poet writing in Hindi
- Dimitris Varos (1949–2017), modern Greek poet, journalist and photographer
- Henry Vaughan (1621–1695), Welsh author, physician and metaphysical poet
- Thomas Vaux, 2nd Baron Vaux of Harrowden (1509–1556), English poet
- Meta Vaux Warrick Fuller (1877–1968), African-American poet, painter and sculptor
- Joana Vaz (c. 1500 – after 1570), Portuguese poet and courtier
- Vazha-Pshavela (aka Luka Razikashvili) (1861–1915), Georgian poet and writer
- Reetika Vazirani (1962–2003), US poet and educator
- Ivan Vazov (1850–1921), Bulgarian poet, novelist and playwright
- Attila Végh (born 1962), Hungarian poet and philosopher
- Maffeo Vegio (Latin: Maphaeus Vegius) (1407–1458), Italian poet in Latin
- Vemana (aka Kumaragiri Vema Reddy), Indian Telugu poet
- Gavril Stefanović Venclović (fl. 1680–1749), Serbian priest, writer, poet and illuminator
- Helen Vendler (1933–2024), US poetry critic and professor
- Jacint Verdaguer (1845–1902), Catalan poet in Spain
- Paul Verlaine (1844–1896), French poet associated with Symbolist movement
- Paul Vermeersch (born 1973), Canadian poet
- Veturi (1936–2010), Telugu poet and songwriter
- Francis Vielé-Griffin (1864–1937), French symbolist poet
- Peter Viereck (1916–2006), US poet, professor and political thinker
- Gilles Vigneault (born 1928), Canadian Quebecois poet, publisher and singer-songwriter
- Judit Vihar (born 1944), Hungarian poet and literary historian
- Jose Garcia Villa (1908–1997), Philippines poet, literary critic and painter
- Xavier Villaurrutia (1903–1950), Mexican poet and playwright
- François Villon (c. 1431–1464), French poet, thief and barroom brawler
- Virgil (Publius Vergilius Maro; 70–19 BCE), ancient Roman poet
- Roemer Visscher (1547–1620), Dutch writer and poet
- Mihály Csokonai Vitéz (1773–1805), Hungarian poet
- Mihailo Vitković (1778–1829), Hungarian poet in Serbian and lawyer
- Walther von der Vogelweide (c. 1170 – c. 1230), celebrated Middle High German lyric poet
- Vincent Voiture (1597–1648), French poet
- Voltaire (François-Marie Arouet) (1694–1778), French Enlightenment writer
- Joost van den Vondel (1587–1679), Dutch playwright and poet
- Andrei Voznesensky (1933–2010), Soviet Russian poet
- Stanko Vraz (1810–1851), Croatian-Slovenian language poet

== W ==
=== Wa–Wh ===
- Wace (c. 1110 – post-1174), Norman poet
- Sidney Wade (born 1951), US poet and professor
- Madge Morris Wagner (1862–1924), US poet, journalist, novelist, editor
- John Wain (1925–1994), English poet, novelist and critic
- Genan Wakil (born 1996), Syrian poet and writer
- Diane Wakoski (born 1937), US poet linked with deep image, confessional and Beat generation poets
- Derek Walcott (1930–2017), Saint Lucian poet and playwright; 1992 Nobel Prize in Literature
- Anne Waldman (born 1945), US poet
- Rosmarie Waldrop (born 1935), German-US poet, translator and publisher
- Arthur Waley (1889–1966), English orientalist and Sinologist, poet and translator
- Alice Walker (born 1944), US author, poet and activist
- Margaret Walker (1915–1998), African-US writer
- Edmund Waller (1606–1687), English poet and politician
- Martin Walser (1927–2023), German writer
- Robert Walser (1878–1956), German-speaking Swiss writer
- Wan Shenzi (1856–1923), Chinese couplet writer
- Connie Wanek (born 1952), US poet
- Wang Wei (王維, 701–761), Tang dynasty Chinese poet, musician and painter
- Wang Wei (王微, 1597–1647), Chinese priestess and poet
- Emily Warn, US poet
- Sylvia Townsend Warner (1893–1978), English novelist and poet
- Robert Penn Warren (1905–1989), US poet, novelist and critic; U.S. Poet Laureate, 1944–1945 and 1986–1987
- Lewis Warsh (1944–2020), US poet, writer and visual artist
- Thomas Warton (1728–1790), English literary historian, critic and poet
- Albert Wass (1908–1998), Hungarian poet and novelist exiled in US
- Aleksander Wat (1900–1967), Polish poet and memoirist
- Vernon Watkins (1906–1967), Welsh poet, translator and painter
- Thomas Watson (1555–1592), English lyric poet in English and Latin
- Samuel Wagan Watson (born 1972), Australian poet
- George Watsky (born 1986), US poet and rapper
- Barrett Watten (born 1948), US poet, editor and educator linked with Language poets
- Isaac Watts (1674–1748), English hymnist and logician
- Theodore Watts-Dunton (1832–1914), English critic and poet
- Tom Wayman (born 1945), Canadian poet, author and educator
- Adam Ważyk (1905–1982), Polish poet and essayist
- Francis Webb (1925–1973), Australian poet
- John Webster (c. 1580 – c. 1634), English dramatist
- Rebecca Wee, US poet and professor
- Hannah Weiner (1928–1997), US Language poet
- Josef Weinheber (1892–1945), Austrian poet
- Sándor Weöres (1913–1989), Hungarian poet and translator
- Wei Yingwu (737–792), Chinese poet
- Wen Yiduo (1899–1946), Chinese poet
- Marjory Heath Wentworth (born 1958), US poet; South Carolina Poet Laureate, 2003–2020
- Charles Wesley (1707–1788), English Methodist leader and hymnist
- Gilbert West (1703–1756), English poet, translator and Christian apologist
- Philip Whalen (1923–2002), US poet, Zen Buddhist and figure in San Francisco Renaissance
- Franz Werfel (1890–1945), Austrian-Bohemian novelist, playwright and poet
- Johan Herman Wessel (1742–1785), Norwegian-Danish poet
- Mary Whateley (1738–1825), English poet and playwright
- Phillis Wheatley (1753–1784), first African-US poet
- Billy Edd Wheeler (1932–2024), US songwriter, performer and poet
- E.B. White (1899–1985), US essayist, author and humorist
- Henry Kirke White (1785–1806), English poet
- James L. White (1936–1981), US poet, editor and teacher
- Robert Whitehall (1624–1685), English poet
- Walt Whitman (1819–1892), US poet, essayist and humanist
- Isabella Whitney (fl. 1567–1573), English poet
- Reed Whittemore (1919–2012), US poet, biographer and critic; U.S. Poet Laureate, 1964–1965 and 1984–1985
- John Greenleaf Whittier (1807–1892), US poet

=== Wi–Wy ===
- Anna Wickham (Edith Alice Mary Harper) (1884–1947), English poet raised in Australia
- Les Wicks (born 1955), Australian poet, publisher and editor
- Ulrika Widström (1764–1841), Swedish poet and translator
- John Wieners (1934–2002), US lyric poet
- Kazimierz Wierzyński (1894–1969), Polish poet and journalist
- Richard Wilbur (1921–2017), US poet; U.S. Poet Laureate, 1987–1988
- Peter Wild (1940–2009), US poet and historian
- Jane Wilde (1826–1896), Irish poet and nationalist
- Oscar Wilde (1854–1900), Irish writer, playwright and poet
- John Wilkinson (born 1953), English poet
- William IX, Duke of Aquitaine (1071–1126), earliest troubadour poet whose work survives
- Aeneas Francon Williams (1886–1971), Anglo-Scottish poet, writer and missionary
- Emmett Williams (1925–2007), US poet and visual artist
- Jonathan Williams (1929–2008), US poet, publisher and essayist
- Heathcote Williams (1941–2017), English poet, political activist and dramatist
- Miller Williams (1930–2015), US poet, translator and editor
- Oscar Williams (1900–1964), Jewish Ukrainian-US anthologist and poet
- Saul Williams (born 1972), African-US singer, poet, writer and actor
- Sherley Anne Williams (1944–1999), African-US poet, novelist and social critic
- Waldo Williams (1904–1971), Welsh poet in Welsh
- William Carlos Williams (1883–1963), poet and physician linked with modernism and imagism; U.S. Poet Laureate, 1952
- William Williams Pantycelyn (1717–1791), Welsh poet and hymnist
- Clive Wilmer (1945–2025), English poet
- John Wilmot, Earl of Rochester (1647–1680), English poet, courtier and satirist
- Eleanor Wilner (born 1937), US poet and editor
- Anne Elizabeth Wilson (1901–1946), US-born Canadian poet, writer, editor
- Peter Lamborn Wilson (Hakim Bey, 1945–2022), US political and cultural writer, essayist and poet
- Christian Wiman (born 1966), US poet and editor
- David Wingate (1828–1892), Scottish poet
- Yvor Winters (1900–1968), US poet and literary critic
- George Wither (1588–1667), English poet, pamphleteer and satirist
- Stanisław Ignacy Witkiewicz (Witkacy, 1885–1939), Polish poet, writer and philosopher
- Stefan Witwicki (1801–1847), Polish poet
- Woeser (born 1966), Tibetan activist, poet and essayist
- Rafał Wojaczek (1945–1971), Polish poet
- Grażyna Wojcieszko (born 1957), Polish poet and essayist
- Christa Wolf (1929–2011), German literary critic, novelist and poet
- Charles Wolfe (1791–1823), Irish poet
- Hans Wollschläger (1935–2007), German writer, translator and historian
- Sholeh Wolpe (born 1962), Iranian-US poet, literary translator and playwright
- Maryla Wolska (Iwo Płomieńczyk, 1873–1930), Polish poet
- George Woodcock (1912–1995), Canadian poet and writer of biography and history
- Gregory Woods (born 1953), English poet who grew up in Ghana
- Dorothy Wordsworth (1771–1855), English author, poet and diarist; sister of William Wordsworth
- William Wordsworth (1770–1850), English Romantic poet
- Philip Stanhope Worsley (1835–1866), English poet
- Carolyn D. Wright (1949–2016), US poet
- Charles Wright (born 1935), US poet; 1998 Pulitzer Prize for Poetry; U.S. Poet Laureate, 2014–2015
- David Wright (1920–1994), South African-born poet and author
- Franz Wright (1953–2015), US poet, son of James Wright; 2004 Pulitzer Prize for Poetry
- James Wright (1927–1980), US poet, father of Franz Wright
- Jay Wright (born 1935), African-US poet, playwright and essayist
- Judith Wright (1915–2000), Australian poet and environmentalist
- Lady Mary Wroth (1587 – c. 1651), English poet
- Thomas Wyatt (1503–1542), English ambassador and lyric poet
- Józef Wybicki (1747–1822), Polish poet and national-anthem writer
- Elinor Wylie (1885–1928), US poet and novelist
- Hedd Wyn (1887–1917), Welsh poet in Welsh
- Edward Alexander Wyon (1842–1872), English architect and poet
- Stanisław Wyspiański (1869–1907), Polish poet, playwright and painter

== X ==
- Xenokleides (4th c. BCE), Athenian poet
- Xin Qiji (1140–1207), Chinese poet
- Cali Xuseen Xirsi (also Yam Yam) (1946–2005), Somali poet active in 1960s
- Lynn Xu (born 1982), Chinese-born American poet
- Xu Pei (born 1966), Chinese-born German poet
- Xu Zhimo (1897–1931), Chinese poet
- Halima Xudoyberdiyeva (1947–2018), Uzbek poet

== Y ==
- Jūkichi Yagi (1898–1927), Japanese religious poet
- Mitsuye Yamada (born 1923), US poet
- Leo Yankevich (born 1961), US poet and editor
- Peyo Yavorov (1878–1914), Bulgarian Symbolist poet
- Raushan Yazdani (1918–1967), Bengali poet and researcher
- W. B. Yeats (1865–1939), Irish poet; 1923 Nobel Prize in Literature
- Sergei Yesenin (1895–1925), Russian lyrical poet
- Yevgeny Yevtushenko (1933–2017), Soviet Russian poet, dramatist and film director
- Yi Suhyŏng (1435–1528), politician and Confucian scholar, writer, and poet
- Lin Yining (1655 – c. 1730), Chinese poet, painter and composer
- Akiko Yosano (1878–1942), Japanese poet, feminist and pacifist
- Nima Yooshij (1895–1960), Iranian poet, Persian poet
- Andrew Young (1885–1971), Scottish poet and clergyman
- Edward Young (1681–1765), English poet
- Ian Young (born 1945), English/Canadian poet
- Kevin Young (born 1970), US poet and teacher
- Marguerite Young (1908–1995), US author of poetry, fiction and non-fiction
- Simpson Charles Younger (1850–1943), baseball player, soldier during the American Civil War, civil rights campaigner, and poet
- A. W. Yrjänä (Aki Ville Yrjänä; born 1967), Finnish poet, musician and songwriter
- Yuan Mei (1716–1797), Chinese poet, scholar and gastronome

== Z ==
- Tymon Zaborowski (1799–1828), Polish poet
- Adam Zagajewski (1945–2021), Polish poet, novelist and essayist
- Józef Bohdan Zaleski (1802–1886), Polish poet
- Wacław Michał Zaleski (1799–1849), Polish poet, critic and politician
- Esperanza Zambrano (1901–1992), Mexican poet
- Andrea Zanzotto (1921–2011), Italian poet
- Matthew Zapruder (born 1967), US poet, translator and professor
- Marya Zaturenska (1902–1982), US lyric poet
- Kazimiera Zawistowska (1870–1902), Polish poet and translator
- Abd al-Wahhab Abu Zayd (living), Saudi poet and translator
- Piotr Zbylitowski (1569–1649), Polish poet and courtier
- Katarzyna Ewa Zdanowicz-Cyganiak (born 1979), Polish poet and journalist
- Mao Zedong (1893-1976), Chinese poet, politician, political theorist, military strategist, revolutionary, and founder of the People's Republic of China
- Emil Zegadłowicz (1888–1941), Polish poet, playwright and translator
- Ludwig Zeller (1927–2019), Chilean poet
- Robert Zend (1929–1985), Hungarian-Canadian poet, fiction writer and artist
- Benjamin Zephaniah (1958–2023), English writer, dub poet and Rastafarian
- Hristofor Zhefarovich (c. 1690–1753), Serbian painter, writer and poet
- Calvin Ziegler (1854–1930), German-US poet in Pennsylvania Dutch
- Narcyza Żmichowska (Gabryella, 1819–1876), Polish poet and novelist
- Radovan Zogović (1907–1986), Serbian/Montenegrin poet
- Miklós Zrínyi (1620–1664), Hungarian poet and statesman
- Zuhayr ibn Abī Sūlmā (520–609), pre-Islamic Arabian poet
- Louis Zukofsky (1904–1978), US objectivist poets
- Jerzy Żuławski (1874–1915), Polish poet, novelist and philosopher
- Juliusz Żuławski (1910–1999), Polish poet, critic and translator
- Huldrych Zwingli (1484–1531), Swiss poet, hymnist and Reformation leader
- Eugeniusz Żytomirski (1911–1975), Polish poet, playwright and novelist in Russia and Canada
