= Stanisław Czycz =

Polish poet and writer (1929–1996)

- Born: 6 April 1929; Gwoździec, Krzeszowice
- Died: 29 June 1996 (aged 67); Kraków
- Occupations: Poet, writer

Stanisław Czycz (6 April 1929 – 29 June 1996) was a poet and writer.

== Biography ==
Son of Władysław Czycz, a railway locksmith, and Helena née Spytkowski, a peasant farmer. After the war, he attended gymnasium in Krzeszowice and the Power and Electrical Technical School in Kraków, graduating in 1952. During this time, he was a member of the Union of Polish Youth. He then worked at the Kraków Construction Stone Works until 1955, first in Kraków and then in Krzeszowice. From 1954, he was a member of the Youth Circle of the Polish Writers' Union (ZLP). He was a member of Polish Writers' Union from 1959 until 1983. He made his debut in 1955 in Życie Literackie in the world premiere of five poets, alongside Miron Białoszewski, Zbigniew Herbert, Jerzy Harasymowicz and Bohdan Drozdowski, in which he was introduced by Ludwik Flaszen. He was a free listener at the Academy of Fine Arts in Kraków, in the workshop of Adam Marczyński. In 1962–1969 he ran a regular column in Przekrój entitled Fotografia jest sztuką trudną (Photography is a difficult art; under the pseudonyms: Michał C. and Michał C. – amateur photographer). From 1966 until 1981 he was married to Barbara Sommer. In 1980 he was awarded with the Golden Badge for Social Work for the city of Kraków. He was a member of Polish Writers Association and Polish PEN Club. He suffered from psoriasis. His remainings were buried at the Krzeszowice Cemetery.

== Poetry books ==
- Tła. Wydawnictwo Literackie. 1957.
- Berenais. PIW. 1960.

== Prose ==
- Ajol. Wydawnictwo Literackie. 1967. Short stories.
- And. Wydawnictwo Literackie. 1967. Short story.
- Nim zajdzie księżyc. Wydawnictwo Literackie. 1968. Short stories.
- Pawana. Wydawnictwo Literackie. 1977. Novel.
- Nie wiem, co ci powiedzieć. Wydawnictwo Literackie. 1983. Short stories.
- Nie wierz nikomu. Wydawnictwo Literackie. 1987. Novel.
- Ajol i Laor. Wydawnictwo Literackie. 1996. Short stories.
- Arw. Wydawnictwo Ha!art. 2007.
- Nie wierz nikomu. Wydawnictwo Ha!art. 2016. Novel.

== Film adaptations ==
Three films were based on works by Stanisław Czycz:

- Pozwólcie nam do woli fruwać nad ogrodem (1974)
- Światło odbite (1989)
- Nad rzeką, której nie ma (1991)

== Bibliography ==
- Wyka, Kazimierz (1977). "Echo katastroficzne". Rzecz wyobraźni. Państwowy Instytut Wydawniczy.
- Stanisław Czycz – mistrz cierpienia. K. Lisowski (collected and prepared by). Kraków: Wydawnictwo Literackie. 1997.
- Rozmus, Jacek (2002). W okolicach arkadii Stanisława Czycza (PDF). Kraków: Wydawnictwo Naukowe Akademii Pedagogicznej. Archived from the original (PDF) on 24 December 2025.
