= Jerzy Grotowski =

Polish theatre director (1933–1999)

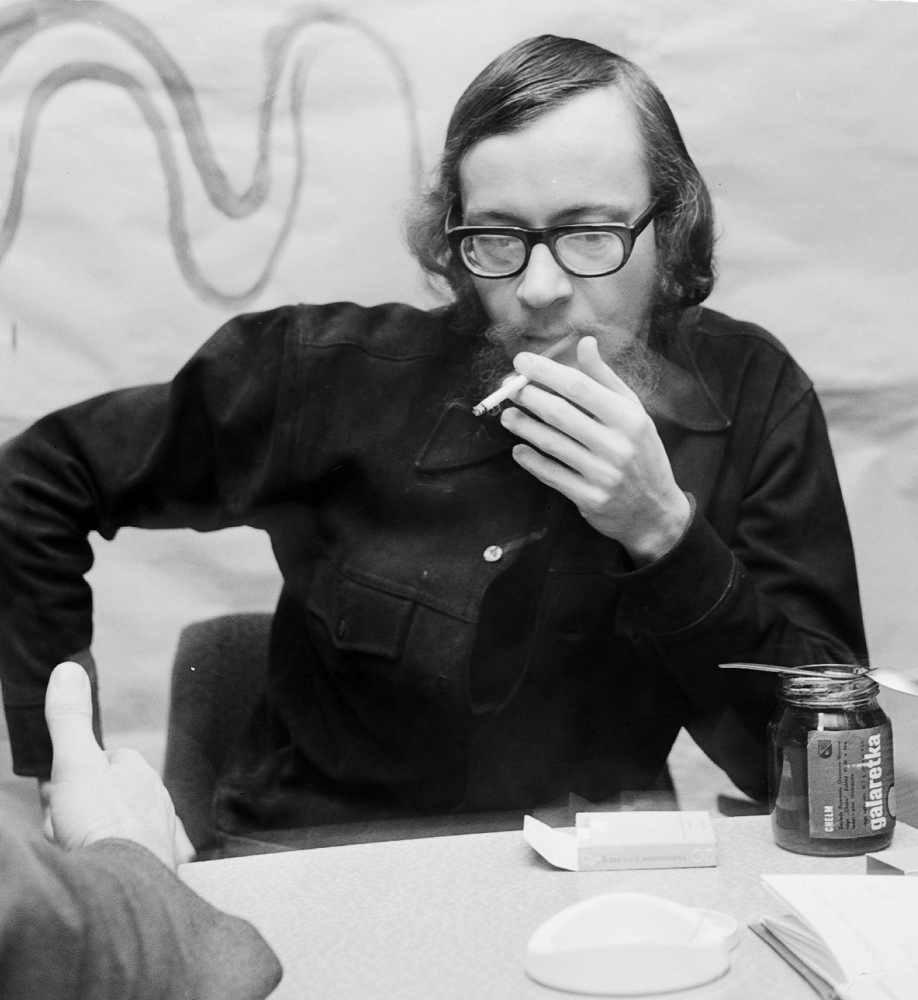
- Grotowski in 1971
- Born: 11 August 1933; Rzeszów, Poland
- Died: 14 January 1999 (aged 65); Pontedera, Tuscany, Italy
- Education: Ludwik Solski Academy for the Dramatic Arts in Kraków; Russian Academy of Theatre Arts
- Occupation: Theatre director
- Writing career
- Notable awards: Golden Cross of Merit (1969); Knight's Cross of the Order of Polonia Restituta (1974); Drama Desk Award for Outstanding Director for The Apocalypse (1970); Ordre des Arts et des Lettres (1989)

Jerzy Marian Grotowski (Polish: [ˈjɛʐɨ ˈmarjan grɔˈtɔfskʲi]; 11 August 1933 – 14 January 1999) was a Polish theatre director and dramatic theorist whose innovative approaches to acting, training and theatrical production have significantly influenced theatre today. He is considered one of the most influential theatre practitioners of the 20th century and one of the founders of experimental theatre.

Grotowski studied acting and directing at the Ludwik Solski Academy of Dramatic Arts in Kraków and Russian Academy of Theatre Arts in Moscow. He debuted as a director in 1957 in Kraków with Eugène Ionesco's play Chairs (co-directed with Aleksandra Mianowska) and shortly afterward founded a small laboratory theatre in 1959 in the town of Opole in Poland. During the 1960s, the company began to tour internationally and his work attracted increasing interest. As his work gained wider acclaim and recognition, Grotowski was invited to work in the United States and left Poland in 1982. Although the company he founded in Poland closed a few years later in 1984, he continued to teach and direct productions in Europe and America. However, Grotowski became increasingly uncomfortable with the adoption and adaptation of his ideas and practices, particularly in the US.

Grotowski left America and moved to Italy where he established the Grotowski Workcenter in 1985 in Pontedera, near Pisa. At this centre, he continued his theatre experimentation and practice, directing training and private theatrical events almost in secret for the last twenty years of his life. Suffering from leukemia and a heart condition, he died in 1999 at his home in Pontedera.

== Biography ==
Grotowski was born on 11 August 1933 in Rzeszów, southeastern Poland, as the second son of Marian, a forestry engineer, and Emilia (née Kozłowska), a teacher. He had an older brother, Kazimierz, who would later become a professor of physics at the Jagiellonian University. He spent the period of the Occupation of Poland during World War II with his mother and brother in the small village of Nienadówka, near Rzeszów. He completed his secondary education in Rzeszów and Kraków. In 1955, Grotowski graduated from the Ludwik Solski Academy of Dramatic Arts in Kraków. He continued his studies at the Russian Academy of Theatre Arts in Moscow where he first encountered the Stanislavski's system – a model of acting based on the psychological realism of the character.

=== Career ===
==== Theatre of Productions ====
Grotowski made his individual directorial debut in 1958 with the production Gods of Rain, which introduced his bold approach to text, which he continued to develop throughout his career, influencing many subsequent theatre artists. Later in 1958, Grotowski moved to Opole, where he was invited by the theatre critic and dramaturg Ludwik Flaszen to serve as director of the Theatre of 13 Rows. There he began to assemble a company of actors and artistic collaborators which would help him realize his unique vision. It was also there that he began to experiment with approaches to performance training, which enabled him to shape young actors. Although his methods were often contrasted to those of Konstantin Stanislavski, he admired the Russian as "the first great creator of a method of acting in the theatre" and praised him for asking "all the relevant questions that could be asked about theatrical technique."

Among the many productions for which his theatre company became famous were Orpheus by Jean Cocteau, Shakuntala based on text by Kalidasa, Dziady (Forefathers' Eve) by Adam Mickiewicz, and Akropolis by Stanisław Wyspiański. This last production was the first complete realization of Grotowski's notion of "poor theatre." In it the company of actors (representing concentration camp prisoners) build the structure of a crematorium around the audience while acting out stories from the Bible and Greek mythology. This conceptualization had particular resonance for the audiences in Opole, as the Auschwitz concentration camp was only sixty miles away. Akropolis received much attention and could be said to have launched Grotowski's career internationally due to inventive and aggressive promotion by visiting foreign scholars and theatre professionals. A film of the production was made with an introduction by Peter Brook, which constitutes one of the most accessible and concrete records of Grotowski's work.

In 1964, Grotowski followed success with success when his theatre premiered The Tragical History of Doctor Faustus based on the Elizabethan drama by Christopher Marlowe, featuring Zbigniew Cynkutis in the title role. Foregoing the use of props altogether, Grotowski let the actors' bodies represent objects. He seated audience members as the guests at Faust's last supper, with the action unfolding on and around their table.

In 1965, Grotowski moved his company to Wrocław, relabeling them a "Teatr Laboratorium", in part to avoid the heavy censorship to which professional "theatres" were subject in Poland at that time. Work had already begun on one of their most famous productions, The Constant Prince (based on Juliusz Słowacki's translation of Calderón's play). Debuting in 1967, this production was soon considered to be a major success. In one of his final essays, Grotowski detailed how he worked individually with actor Ryszard Cieslak for more than a year to develop the scenes of torture and martyrdom intrinsic to the play.

Grotowski's last professional production as a director was in 1969. Entitled Apocalypsis Cum Figuris, it uses texts from the Bible, this time combined with contemporary writings from authors such as T. S. Eliot and Simone Weil, this production was cited by members of the company as an example of a group 'total act'. The development of Apocalypsis took more than three years, beginning as a staging of Słowacki's Samuel Zborowski and passing through a separate stage of development as a staging of the Gospels, Ewangelie (elaborated as a completed performance though never presented to audiences) before arriving to its final form.

Grotowski revolutionized theatre and along with his first apprentice, Eugenio Barba, leader and founder of Odin Teatret, is considered a father of contemporary experimental theatre. Barba was instrumental in revealing Grotowski to the world outside the iron curtain. He was the editor of the seminal book Towards a Poor Theatre (1968), which Grotowski wrote together with Ludwik Flaszen, in which it is declared that theatre should not, because it could not, compete against the overwhelming spectacle of film and should instead focus on the very root of the act of theatre: actors cocreating the event of theatre with its spectators.

Theatre - through the actor's technique, his art in which the living organism strives for higher motives - provides an opportunity for what could be called integration, the discarding of masks, the revealing of the real substance: a totality of physical and mental reactions. This opportunity must be treated in a disciplined manner, with a full awareness of the responsibilities it involves. Here we can see the theatre's therapeutic function for people in our present[-]day civilization. It is true that the actor accomplishes this act, but he can only do so through an encounter with the spectator - intimately, visibly, not hiding behind a cameraman, wardrobe mistress, stage designer or make-up girl - in direct confrontation with him, and somehow " instead of" him. The actor's act - discarding half measures, revealing, opening up, emerging from himself as opposed to closing up - is an invitation to the spectator. This act could be compared to an act of the most deeply rooted, genuine love between two human beings - this is just a comparison since we can only refer to this "emergence from oneself" through analogy. This act, paradoxical and borderline, we call a total act. In our opinion it epitomizes the actor's deepest calling.

==== Debut in the west ====
The year 1968 marked Grotowski's debut in the West. His company performed the Stanisław Wyspiański play Akropolis/Acropolis (1964) at the Edinburgh Festival. This was a fitting vehicle for Grotowski and his poor theatre because his treatment of the play in Poland had already achieved wider recognition and was published in Pamiętnik Teatralny (Warsaw, 1964), Alla Ricerca del Teatro Perduto (Padova, 1965), and Tulane Drama Review (New Orleans, 1965). It marked the first time many in Britain had been exposed to "poor theatre". The same year, his book titled Towards a Poor Theatre appeared in Danish, published by Odin Teatrets Forlag. It appeared in English the following year, published by Methuen and Co. Ltd., with an Introduction by Peter Brook, then an associate director at the Royal Shakespeare Company. In it he writes feelingly about Grotowski's private consulting for the company; he/they felt Grotowski's work was unique but equally understood that its value was diminished if talked about too much, if faith were broken with the consultant.

Grotowski's company made its debut in the United States under the auspices of the Brooklyn Academy of Music in the fall of 1969. BAM built a theatre for Grotowski's company in the Washington Square Methodist Church in Greenwich Village. Three productions were presented: Akropolis, The Constant Prince and Apocalypsis Cum Figuris during a three-week run.

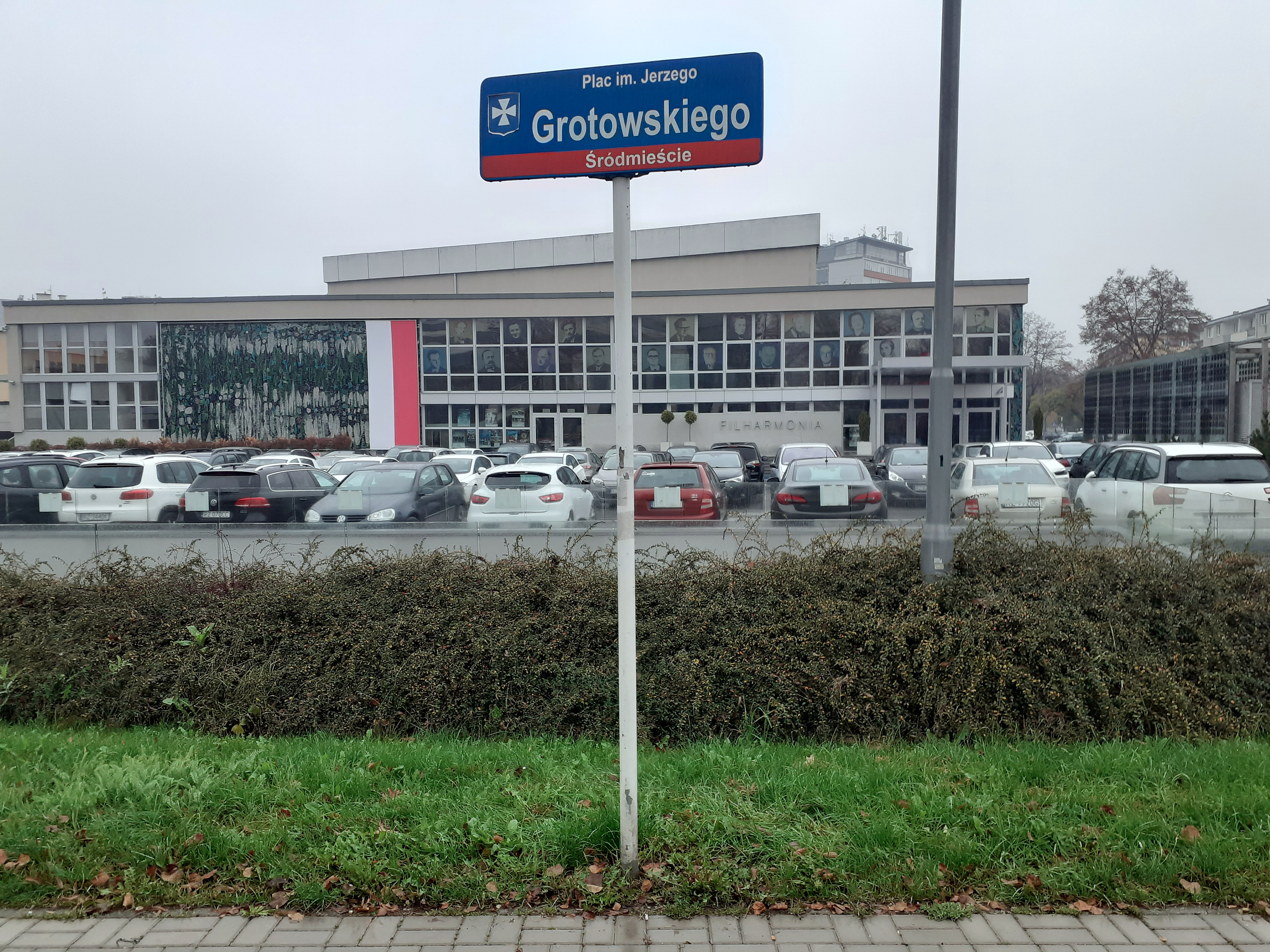
Jerzy Grotowski Square, Rzeszów

==== Paratheatrical phase ====
In 1973 Grotowski published Holiday, which outlined a new course of investigation. He would pursue this 'Paratheatrical' phase until 1978. This phase is known as the 'Paratheatrical' phase of his career because it was an attempt to transcend the separation between performer and spectator. Grotowski attempted this through the organization of communal rites and simple interactive exchanges that went on sometimes for extended periods, attempting to provoke in poor participants a deconditioning of impulse. The most widely circulated description of one of these post-theatrical events (a "beehive") is given by Andre Gregory, Grotowski's longtime friend and the American director whose work he most strongly endorsed, in My Dinner With Andre. Various collaborators who had been important to Grotowski's work in what he termed his "Theatre of Productions" phase had difficulty following him in these explorations beyond the boundary of conventional theatre. Other, younger members of the group came to the foreground, notably Jacek Zmysłowski, whom many would consider Grotowski's closest collaborator in this period. Theatre critics have often exoticized and mystified Grotowski's work on the basis of these paratheatrical experiments, suggesting that his work should be seen in the lineage of Antonin Artaud, a suggestion Grotowski strongly resisted. Later in life, he clarified that he quickly found this direction of research limiting, having realized that unstructured work frequently elicits banalities and cultural cliché from participants.

==== Theatre of Sources ====
In this period of his work, Grotowski traveled intensively through India, Mexico, Haiti and elsewhere, seeking to identify elements of technique in the traditional practices of various cultures that could have a precise and discernible effect on participants. Key collaborators in this phase of work include Włodzimierz Staniewski, subsequently founder of Gardzienice Theatre, Jairo Cuesta and Magda Złotowska, who traveled with Grotowski on his international expeditions. His interest in ritual techniques linked to Haitian practice led Grotowski to a long-standing collaboration with Maud Robart and Jean-Claude Tiga of Saint Soleil. Always a master strategist, Grotowski made use of his international ties and the relative freedom of travel allowed him to pursue this program of cultural research in order to flee Poland following the imposition of martial law. He spent time in Haiti and in Rome, where he delivered a series of important lectures on the topic of theatre anthropology at the Sapienza University of Rome in 1982 before seeking political asylum in the United States. His dear friends Andre and Mercedes Gregory helped Grotowski to settle in the US, where he taught at Columbia University for one year while attempting to find support for a new program of research.

==== Objective Drama ====
Unable (despite the best efforts of Richard Schechner) to secure resources for his projected research in Manhattan, in 1983 Grotowski received an invitation from Robert Cohen to come to the University of California, Irvine, where he began a course of work known as "Objective Drama." This phase of his research focused on participants' psychophysiological responses to selected songs and other performative tools derived from traditional cultures, focusing specifically on relatively simple techniques that could elicit discernible and predictable effects on the 'doers', regardless of their belief structures or culture of origin. Ritual songs and related performative elements linked to Haitian and other African diaspora traditions became a favoured tool of research. During this time Grotowski continued several collaborative relationships begun in earlier phases, and Maud Robart, Jairo Cuesta and Pablo Jimenez took on significant roles as performers and research leaders in the project. He also initiated a creative relationship with the American Keith Fowler and his student, James Slowiak. Another trusted collaborator was Thomas Richards, son of Canadian-American director Lloyd Richards, to whom Grotowski would ultimately pass on responsibility for his lifelong research.

==== Art as Vehicle ====
In 1986, Grotowski was invited by Roberto Bacci to his theater center in Pontedera, Italy. There, he was offered an opportunity to conduct long-term research on performance without the pressure of having to show results until he was ready. Grotowski gladly accepted, taking with him three assistants from Objective Drama research (Richards, Jimenez and Slowiak) to help in founding his Italian Workcenter. Robart also led a work-team in Pontedera for several years, after which time funding cuts necessitated downscaling to a single research group, led by Richards. Grotowski characterized the focus of his attention in his final phase of research as "art as a vehicle," a term coined by Peter Brook. "It seems to me," Brook said, "that Grotowski is showing us something which existed in the past but has been forgotten over the centuries; that is that one of the vehicles which allows man to have access to another level of perception is to be found in the art of performance." Moreover, it was in 1986 that Grotowski changed the name of the Italian centre to the Workcenter of Jerzy Grotowski and Thomas Richards, to signal the unique and central place Richards held in his work. Grotowski drove Richards to take on increasingly greater responsibility and leadership in the work, until he was not only the primary doer in the practice of Art as Vehicle, but also its primal leader and "director" (if such a term can be accurately used) of the performance structures created around these Afro-Caribbean vibratory songs, most significantly 'Downstairs Action' (filmed by Mercedes Gregory in 1989) and 'Action', on which work began in 1994 and continues to the present. Italian actor Mario Biagini, who joined the Workcenter shortly after its founding, also became a central contributor to this research. Although Grotowski died in 1999 at the end of a prolonged illness, the research of Art as Vehicle continues at the Pontedera Workcenter, with Richards as artistic director and Biagini as associate director. Grotowski's Will declared the two his "universal heirs," holders of copyright on the entirety of his textual output and intellectual property.

== Voice work ==
Jerzy Grotowski was among a small group of actors and directors, including Peter Brook and Roy Hart, who sought to explore new forms of theatrical expression without employing the spoken word. In the programme notes to the production of one of Grotowski's performances called Akropolis, of which the premiere was in October 1962, one of the performers stated:

The means of verbal expression have been considerably enlarged because all means of vocal expression are used, starting from the confused babbling of the very small child and including the most sophisticated oratorical recitation. Inarticulate groans, animal roars, tender folksongs, liturgical chants, dialects, declamation of poetry: everything is there. The sounds are interwoven in a complex score which brings back fleetingly the memory of all forms of language.

Grotowski and his group of actors became known in particular for their experimental work on the human voice, partially inspired by the work of Roy Hart, who in turn furthered the extended vocal technique initially established by Alfred Wolfsohn. Alan Seymour, speaking of Grotowski's 1963 production of Faustus noted that the performers' voices 'reached from the smallest whisper to an astonishing, almost cavernous tone, an intoned declaiming, of a resonance and power I have not heard from actors before'.

The use of non-verbal voice in these productions was part of Grotowski's investigation into the use of the actor's own self as the substance of performance, and his work was founded upon his belief in the ability of a human being to express physically and vocally aspects of the psyche, including those parts allegedly buried in what Carl Jung called the collective unconscious, without recourse to words.

== Analytical psychology ==
Both Grotowski and Hart compared the desired effect of the rehearsal process upon their actors, and the impact of their performances upon the audience to psychotherapy, drawing upon the principles of Carl Jung and analytical psychology to explain the principles behind their creativity. Grotowski said that theatre 'is a question of a gathering which is subordinated to ritual: nothing is represented or shown, but we participate in a ceremonial which releases the collective unconscious'. Grotowski repeatedly described his rehearsal process and performances as 'sacred', seeking to revive what he understood to be the routes of drama in religious ritual and spiritual practice.

To achieve his aims, Grotowski demanded that his actors draw from their psyches images of a collective significance and give them form through the motion of the body and the sound of the voice. Grotowski's ultimate aim was to effect in the actor change and growth, transformation and rebirth in order that the actor, in turn, could precipitate a similar development in the audience. It was for this reason that Grotowski often chose to base productions on works based on ancient narratives. For he believed that they 'embodied myths and images powerful and universal enough to function as archetypes, which could penetrate beneath the apparently divisive and individual structure of the Western psyche, and evoke a spontaneous, collective, internal response'.

James Roose-Evans states that Grotowski's theatre 'speaks directly to the fundamental experience of each person present, to what Jung described as the collective unconscious ... what Grotowski asks of the actor is not that he play the Lady from the Sea or Hamlet, but that he confront these characters within himself and offer the result of that encounter to an audience.

Grotowski, like Hart, did not consider the dramatic text or script to be primary in this process, but believed that the text 'becomes theatre only through the actors' use of it, that is to say, thanks to intonations, to the association of sounds, to the musicality of language'. Grotowski thus pursued the possibility of creating 'ideograms' made up of 'sounds and gestures' which 'evoke associations in the psyche of the audience'. But, for Grotowski, as for Hart, there was, between the psyche's reservoir of images and the bodily and vocal expression of that imagery, a series of inhibitions, resistances and blocks, which his acting exercises set out to remove. Many of the acting exercises and rehearsal techniques developed by Grotowski were designed to removing these personal obstacles, which prevented the physical and vocal expression of this imagery, and Grotowski proposed that such a training process 'leads to a liberation from complexes in much the same way as psychoanalytic therapy'.

== Recognition and honours ==
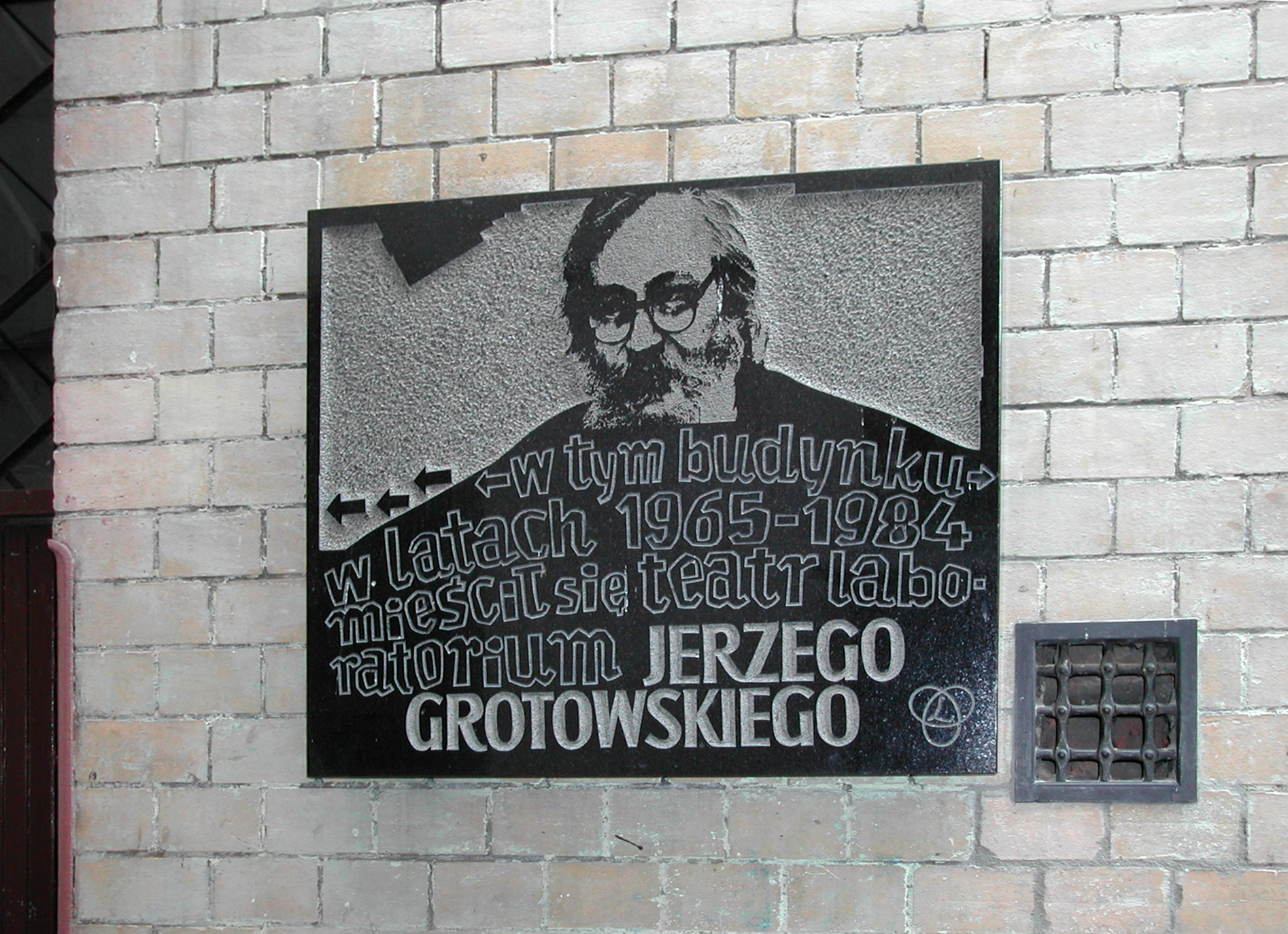
A commemorative plaque devoted to Grotowski in Wrocław

- 1969: Golden Cross of Merit
- 1970: Drama Desk Award for The Apocalypse
- 1972: 1st Degree State Prize for his "creative work at the Laboratory Theatre in the field of staging and research on the art of acting"
- 1973: Honorary doctorate from the University of Pittsburgh
- 1974: Knight's Cross of the Order of Polonia Restituta
- 1979: Officer's Cross of the Order of Polonia Restituta
- 1985: Honorary doctorate from DePaul University in Chicago
- 1987: Honorary Foreign Member of the American Academy of Arts and Sciences
- 1989: Commandeur dans l’Ordre des Arts et des Lettres
- 1991: MacArthur Fellowship
- 1991: Honorary doctorate from the University of Wrocław
- 1994: Honorary doctorate from the New School for Social Research, New York
- 1996: The Konrad Swinarski Prize conferred by the Teatr monthly
- 1997: Professor at the Collège de France, Chair of Theatrical Anthropology
- 1997: Honorary citizenship of the city of Opole
- 1998: Honorary citizenship of the city of Wrocław
- 2000: Commander's Cross with Star of the Order of Polonia Restituta, posthumously
- 2004: Bronze statue of Grotowski was unveiled in Opole

== Bibliography ==
- Towards a Poor Theatre (Introduction by Peter Brook) (1968)
- The Theatre of Grotowski by Jennifer Kumiega, London: Methuen, 1987.
- At Work with Grotowski on Physical Actions by Thomas Richards, London: Routledge, 1995.
- The Grotowski Sourcebook ed. by Lisa Wolford and Richard Schechner, London: Routledge, 1997.
- A Dictionary of Theatre Anthropology: The Secret Art of the Performer by Eugenio Barba, 2001.
- Biography of Grotowski by Holly Slayford, 2010.
- Grotowski's Bridge Made of Memory: Embodied Memory, Witnessing and Transmission in the Grotowski Work by Dominika Laster, Calcutta: Seagull Books, 2016.

== See also ==
- Theatre in Poland
- List of Poles
- Stanislavski's system
