= Zbigniew Herbert =

Polish poet (1924–1998)

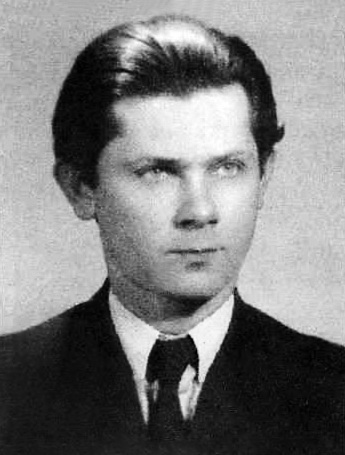
- Herbert in 1964
- Born: 29 October 1924; Lwów, Poland
- Died: 28 July 1998 (aged 73); Warsaw, Poland
- Resting place: Powązki Cemetery
- Occupations: Poet, essayist
- Spouse: Katarzyna Dzieduszycka (m. 1968)
- Writing career
- Language: Polish, German
- Notable awards: Austrian State Prize for European Literature; 1965; Herder Prize; 1973; Jerusalem Prize; 1991; Vilenica Prize; 1991; Order of the White Eagle; 2007

Zbigniew Herbert (Polish: [ˈzbiɡɲɛf ˈxɛrbɛrt]; 29 October 1924 – 28 July 1998) was a Polish poet, essayist, drama writer and moralist. He is one of the best known and the most translated post-war Polish writers. While he was first published in the 1950s (a volume titled Chord of Light was issued in 1956), soon after he voluntarily ceased submitting most of his works to official Polish government publications. He resumed publication in the 1980s, initially in the underground press. Starting in the 1960s, he was nominated several times for the Nobel Prize in Literature. His books have been translated into 38 languages.

Herbert was one of the main poets of the Polish opposition to communism. Starting in 1986, he lived in Paris, where he cooperated with the journal Zeszyty Literackie. He came back to Poland in 1992. On 1 July 2007 the Polish Government instituted 2008 as the Year of Zbigniew Herbert. In 2013, the Zbigniew Herbert International Literary Award was established in honour of the poet and his literary legacy. He received the 1963 Kościelski Prize (Geneva), 1965 Jurzykowski Prize, 1965 Austrian State Prize for European Literature, 1973 Herder Prize (Austria), 1979 Petrarca-Preis (Germany), and 1991 Jerusalem Prize (Israel).

== Biography ==
=== 1924–1956 ===
Zbigniew Herbert was born on 29 October 1924 to Boleslaw Herbert and his wife Maria, née Kaniak. Herbert's Austrian ancestor came to Galicia from Vienna around the turn of the 18th and 19th century. The poet's father was a soldier in the Polish Legions during World War I and a defender of Lwów; he was a lawyer and worked as a bank manager. Herbert's grandmother was Armenian; his grandfather was an English language teacher.

Herbert claimed to be a distant relative of the 17th-century Anglo-Welsh poet George Herbert.

Before the war Zbigniew Herbert attended the Państwowe VIII Gimnazjum i Liceum im. Króla Kazimierza Wielkiego we Lwowie (during the Soviet occupation the name was changed to High School nr 14). After the German and Soviet invasion and subsequent occupation of Lwów, he continued his studies at the secret meetings organized by the Polish underground, where he graduated and passed the school leaving exam (matura) in January 1944. At the same time, (following the Nazi invasion of Poland in 1939) he got involved in conspiratorial action with the AK. During the occupation, he worked as a louse-feeder in the Rudolf Weigl Institute that produced anti-typhus vaccines; he also worked as a salesman in a shop with metal articles. He began Polish philology studies at the secret University of Jan Kazimierz in Lwów but had to break them off as a result of moving to Kraków (spring 1944, before the invasion of the Soviet Red Army in Lwów). Lwów after the war became a Ukrainian Soviet city, no longer within Polish borders. Its previous Polish population had been expelled. The loss of his beloved hometown, and the following feeling of being uprooted, were important motifs in his later works.

At first, he lived in Proszowice, near Kraków (May 1944 – January 1945). Herbert studied economics in Kraków and attended lectures at the Jagiellonian University and at the Academy of Fine Arts. In 1947, after three years of study, he got his Trade Academy diploma. He lived in Sopot (from 1948), where his parents moved in 1946. He worked different jobs; in the Polish National Bank (NBP) in Gdynia (1 March – 30 June 1948), as a sub-editor of the journal Przegląd Kupiecki, and in Gdańsk department of the Polish Writers' Union (ZLP). He met Halina Misiołkowa there (their relationship lasted until 1957). In 1948 he became a member-candidate of the ZLP but resigned in 1951; however, he joined the union again in 1955.

While living in Sopot, he continued his law studies at the Nicolaus Copernicus University in Toruń, where he received a Master of Law. In the same year he was carried on the list on the second year of Philosophy at NCU in Toruń, where he was inter alia a student of his later master, Henryk Elzenberg. In 1949 Herbert moved to Toruń, and worked in the District Museum and in primary school as a teacher.

In Autumn 1951 the poet moved to the University of Warsaw, where he continued studying philosophy for some time. At first, he lived alone in very poor conditions in suburban Warsaw, Brwinów, but then (December 1952 – January 1957), he lived in Warsaw itself on Wiejska Street in a room rented by 12 people. Subsequently, Herbert moved to an official flat on Aleje Jerozolimskie.

He tried to live from his writing. However, since he did not follow the official socrealistic style of literature and was unwilling to write political propaganda this proved to be unsuccessful. He published theatrical and musical criticisms and reports from exhibits which ignored the criteria of socrealistic art. In 1948 the weekly magazine Tygodnik Wybrzeża published his cycle Poetyka dla Laików (Poetry for Lay People). Herbert also published a few of his reviews in the journal Słowo Powszechne in 1949 under his real name and a year later under a pen name, Patryk. The same happened with his publishing in Tygodnik Powszechny. In 1952 Przegląd Powszechny, published a few of his reviews under a pen name – Bolesław Hertyński.

He published under the pen name Stefan Martha in Dziś i Jutro, the PAX Association magazine (1950–1953). These periodicals represented a different styles of Catholicism. Pax sought to 'collaborate' with the communist government, while Tygodnik Powszechny took a more oppositional stance (it was legal but its circulation was limited). Herbert definitely finished his cooperation with PAX in 1953. Przegląd Powszechny was closed and Tygodnik Powszechny was transferred to PAX after it refused to publish an obituary of Joseph Stalin's death. In this situation Herbert decided that his cooperation with PAX was impossible.

During this time, he also earned money from biographies and librarian registrations. From January until July 1952, he was a paid blood donor. He also again had to undertake work unconnected with writing. He worked as a timekeeper in the (disabled teachers' retirement co-operative) Inwalidzka Spółdzielnia Emerytów Nauczycieli 'Wspólna Sprawa' (from 1 October 1953 till 15 January 1954), and also as a senior assistant in the (peat industry central bureau) Centralne Biuro Studiów i Projektów Przemysłu Torfowego Projekt Torf (19 January – 31 November). Thanks to the help of Stefan Kisielewski, Herbert worked as a manager of the office of the Chief Management in the Union of Socialist Composers (ZKP) from September 1956 till March 1957.

=== 1956–1981 ===
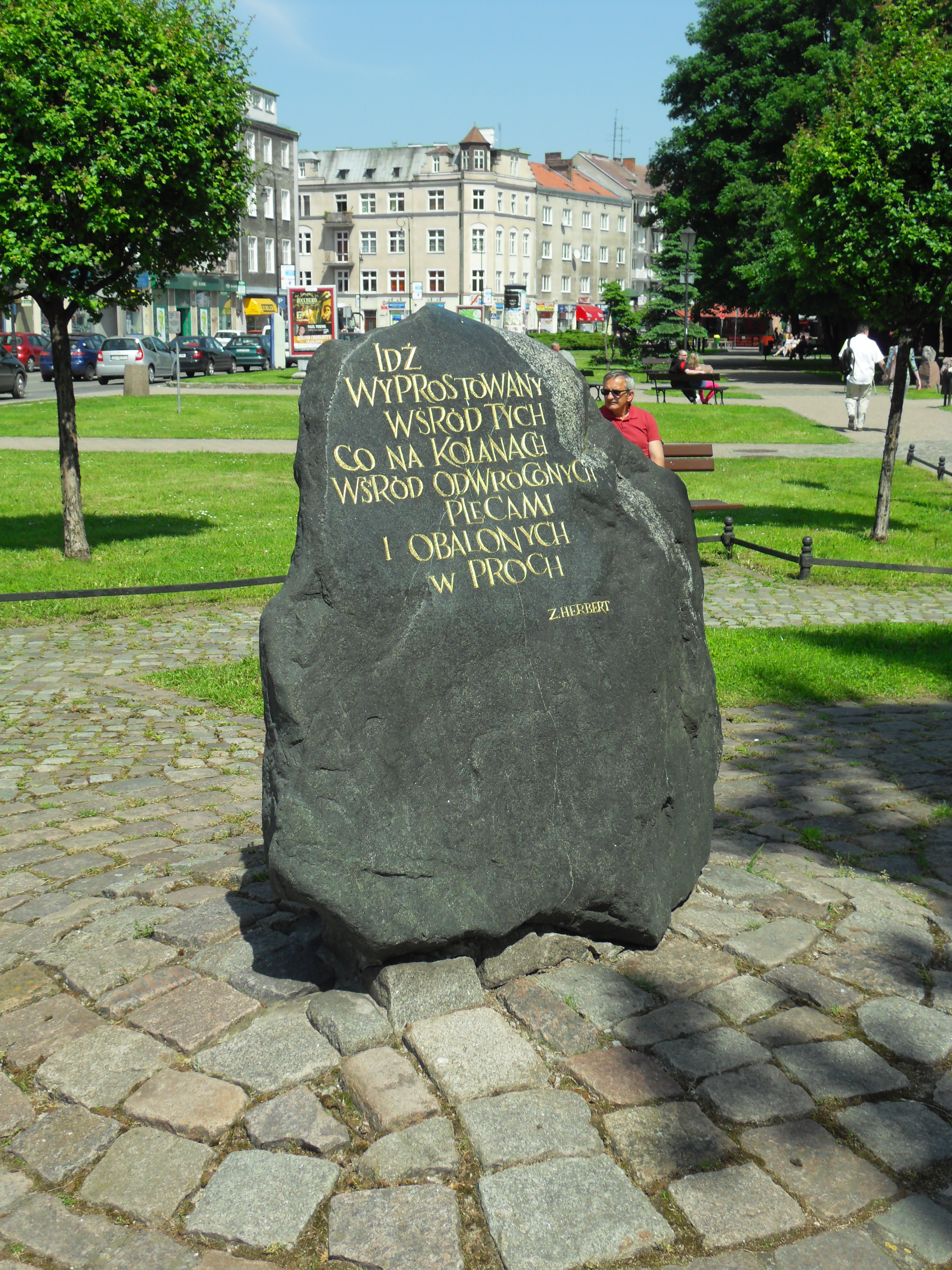
An excerpt from The Envoy of Mr. Cogito, Gdańsk

The year 1956 in Poland marked the end of Stalinism and as a result also of social realism as the only and obligatory style in art and literature. This enabled Herbert's debut as a poet. Thanks to this, his material position also improved. In 1957 supported by Jerzy Zawieyski he received a small studio to live in (in Warsaw) one of the flats distributed for young writers by the Polish Union of Writers (ZLP). He also was granted a scholarship (US$100) that allowed him to go on his first trip abroad.

Herbert was attached to his homeland, but at the same time was deeply disgusted by all effects (political, economical, cultural etc.) of the communist rules enforced by the Soviet Union on Poland (arguably the best artistic expression of this disgust is contained in his poem "The Power of Taste"). Therefore, a will to escape from this gloomy reality and see "a better world" was one of important driving forces behind his passion for traveling. Even though he spent a great deal of time abroad he never wanted to choose the life of an émigré. Despite administrative difficulties imposed by the communist regime with regard to longer stays abroad he always tried to extend his Polish passport while abroad so that the possibility of coming back home was always open. His first lively impressions from his trips and reflections triggered by the direct contact with the cultural heritage of the Western Europe were enclosed in the essay "The Barbarian in the Garden" (Barbarzyńca w Ogrodzie, 1962). He also says in his poem The Prayer of Mr. Cogito – The Traveller (Modlitwa Pana Cogito – podróżnika) travelling allowed him to get to know better the world beautiful and of such variety.

Herbert's trips cost as little as possible, as a poet's finances (from not stable sources: prizes, honorariums for the readings etc.) were very limited. This way of life contributed to his weak health condition in the future; however, he traveled through Vienna to France (May 1958 – January 1959), he visited England (January – March 1959), Italy (June – July 1959) and then France again. He came to Poland in May 1960. The result of that journey was the essay Barbarzyńca w ogrodzie (The Barbarian in the Garden).

In Autumn 1960 Herbert travelled to England and Scotland. In December 1963 he went to Paris. In January 1964 he was given the Kościelski Prize in the Polish Library in Paris, which allowed him to extend his stay in the West. In 1964 he spent the summer in Italy (July – August) and in Greece (October 1964). Then he came back to France and at the end of that year he returned to Poland.

From 1965 till 1968 he was a member of the editorial team at the monthly magazine Poetry. In 1965-1966 he was a literary manager of the Juliusz Osterwa Theatre in Gorzów Wielkopolski.

In October 1965 he was awarded with The Lenau Prize, and he went Vienna to receive it. This period also marks a growing international esteem for Herbert as a man of culture. He becomes a member of Academy of Arts in West Berlin and Bavarian Academy of Fine Arts in Munich. He stayed in Austria till spring 1966.

Herbert traveled across Germany, and then stayed longer in France (June 1966 – September 1967). He then went back to Germany, visiting the Netherlands and Belgium. On 29 March 1968, he married Katarzyna Dzieduszycka at a Polish consulate in France. At the end of April, the Herberts returned to Berlin. In the summer of 1968, Herbert visited the US (invited by the Poetry Center). He went to New York, California, The Grand Canyon, New Mexico, New Orleans, Washington, D.C. and Los Angeles. At that time, the translation of his works was published in the U.S., which made Herbert one of the most popular contemporary poets in English literary circles. While traveling across the country, he gave several talks in New York, Berkeley and Los Angeles. After visiting the U.S., Herbert went back to Berlin, where he lived until September 1970 (with some short breaks to Poland and a holiday in Italy). In 1969, he took part in Dei Duo Mundi – The Festival of Two Worlds. From September 1970 to June 1971, the Herberts again stayed in the U.S., where the poet gave lectures as a visiting professor at California State University, Los Angeles.

From autumn 1971 to spring 1973, not having his own flat, he lived in Artur Międzyrzecki's flat in Warsaw. In 1972, he became a member of the board of the Polish Literary Association (ZLP). At that time, he got involved in pro-democracy actions initiated by writer circles – he was one of the signatories of 'List 17' ('Letter of 17') which supported civil rights of the members of an openly anti-communist organization, The Movement (Ruch). He was also an organizer of protests against censorship. In 1972 he joined the Pen Club. In 1973, he received the Herder's Prize in Vienna. The summer of that year he spent together with Magdalena and Zbigniew Czajkowscy in Greece. He came back to Poland in autumn 1973. He spent the academic year of 1973–74 giving lectures at the University of Gdansk. In 1974, he wrote the 'Letter of 15' ('List 15') which was about the laws of the Polish Community in the Soviet Union. In December 1975, he signed 'Letter of 59' ('Memoriał 59') against the changes in the Constitution of the People's Republic of Poland forced by the communist party introducing mostly declarations of eternal loyalty of Poland to the Soviet Union. In 1974, he settled on Promenade Street in Warsaw.

From 1975 to 1981, Herbert lived abroad, mainly in Germany, Austria and Italy.

=== 1981–1998 ===
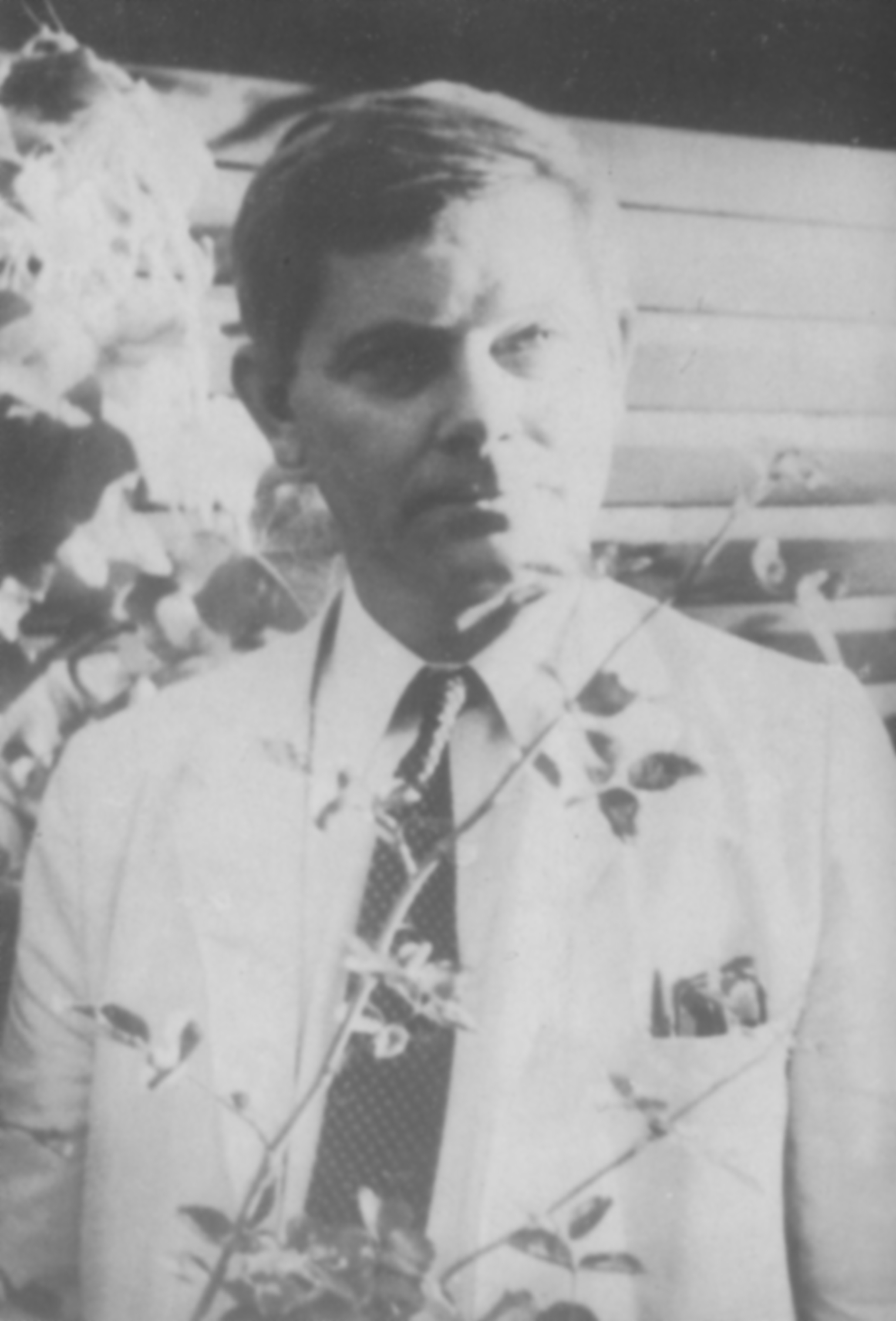
Zbigniew Herbert (early 1980s)

Herbert came back to Poland at the beginning of 1981 – in the short period of the legal existence of Solidarity, the only independent mass organization in the Soviet bloc. At that time he joined the editorial team of the underground journal Zapis (Record). At the time of the martial law he supported the opposition personally, under his own name – he attended the secret meetings and published in 'second circulation'. His writings have become the manifesto of freedom, the expression of the resistance and the poet himself has become the symbol of uncompromised objection, especially for the young people. Przemysław Gintrowski played a huge role in presenting Herbert to the contemporary audience. Together with Jacek Kaczmarski and Zbigniew Łapiński, he composed the music to the poet's writings and performed it on stage. Herbert himself wasn't pleased with these doings at the beginning. However, later he accepted them and joked that he "writes lyrics for Gintrowski".

In 1986 Herbert moved to Paris. In 1989 he joined the Polish Writers' Association (Stowarzyszenie Pisarzy Polskich). A year later he became a member of the American Academy and Institute of Arts and Letters. In 1991, receiving the Jerusalem Prize gave Herbert another reason to travel to Israel for a while. There he befriended Yehuda Amichai and wrote a poem about him. "To Yehuda Amichai, Because you are a king and I'm only a prince"...

In 1992 the seriously ill poet returned to Warsaw. The fierce anti-communist journalism of Tygodnik Solidarność (1994, # 41) and supporting the statement of the editorial office of Arka magazine about the decommunisation of the elites stoked the controversy among Herbert's opposition friends. He praised the Cold War anti-communist spy Colonel Ryszard Kukliński in an open letter to then president Lech Wałęsa in 1994, and later also expressed support for the Chechen Dzjochar Dudajev. He also organized the financial aid for Chechnya. This wasn't his only initiative. Earlier in an open letter to U.S. President George H. W. Bush he criticized the indifference towards the situation of Kurds. What is more, he supported the investigation of Liga Republikańska (Republican League) in the case of assassination of Stanisław Pyjas and advocated revealing the UB (Office of Security) files from 1956. In 1994 in the interview for Tygodnik Solidarność he criticized not only the Round Table Agreement and the politics of the Third Polish Republic (III Rzeczpospolita), but also accused some prominent public figures, such as Czesław Miłosz and Adam Michnik as being personally responsible for the country's difficulties. These controversial opinions prompted counter-polemics that would continue even after Herbert's death. This conflict has its roots in different judgments on the communist regime in Poland at the time of the People's Republic of Poland.

In 1993 Herbert became a member of the American Academy of Arts and Sciences.

In 1994, already in a wheelchair, he traveled to the Netherlands and visited an exhibition about the 17th century tulip mania in the Nieuwe Kerk in Amsterdam. The Dutch newspaper NRC Handelsblad invited Herbert to visit this exhibition because he wrote a book with essays about the "Golden age" of the Netherlands.

The last years of his life he spent in bed fighting with severe asthma. Despite that he never stopped working – Epilog burzy (Epilogue to a Storm) was published shortly before his death.

Zbigniew Herbert died on 28 July 1998, in Warsaw. He was buried in Powązki Cemetery. President Aleksander Kwaśniewski sought posthumously to honor Herbert with the Order of the White Eagle, but his widow Katarzyna declined to accept the honor. On 3 May 2007, Herbert was posthumously awarded with the Order of the White Eagle by President Lech Kaczyński; Herbert's widow Katarzyna and sister Halina Herbert-Żebrowska accepted the Order.

== Writing ==
=== Poetry ===
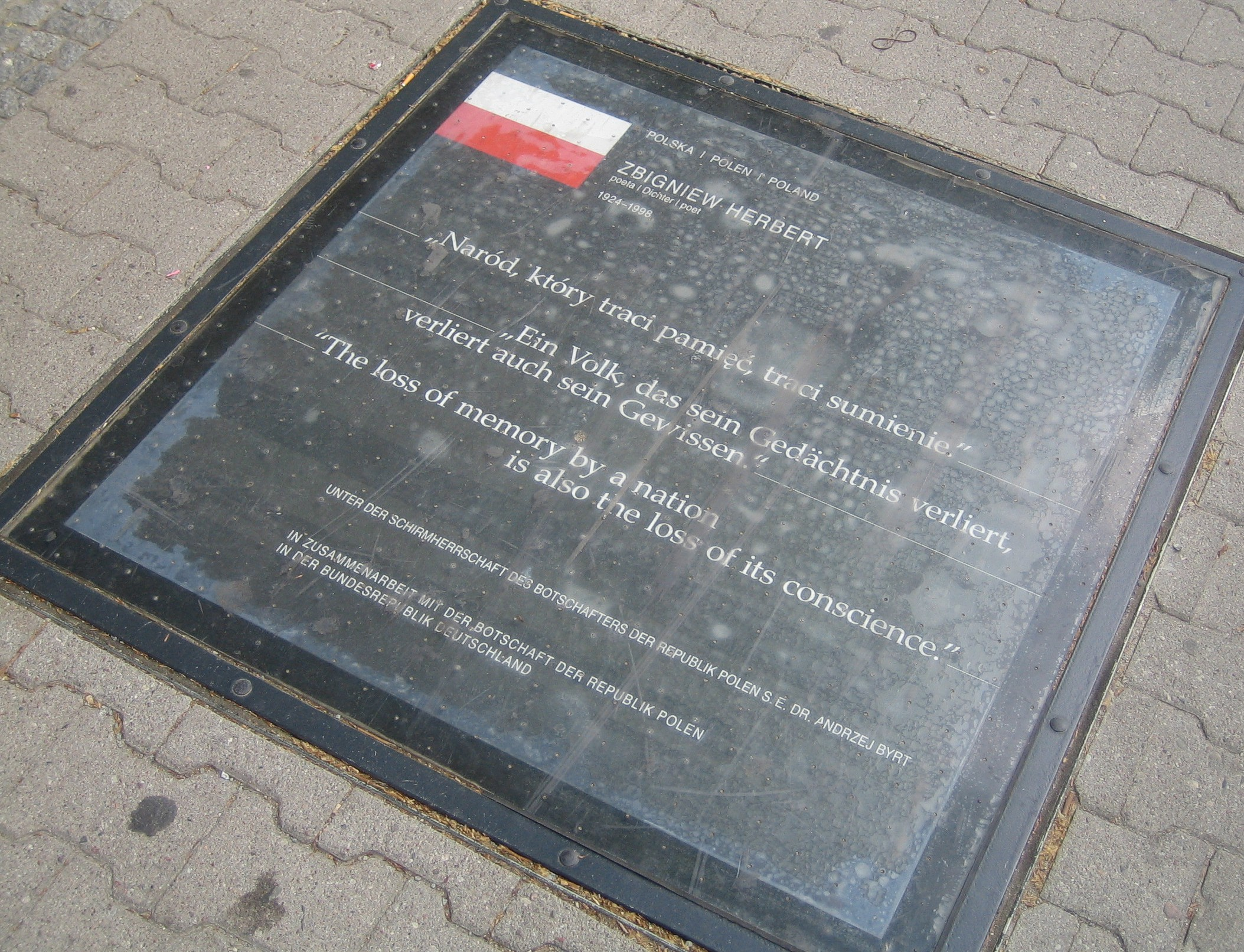
"The loss of memory by a nation is also a loss of its conscience" (Herbert). Plaque at Mehringplatz, Berlin.

The first poems by Zbigniew Herbert were published in Dziś i jutro (#37, 1950). Poems entitled: Napis (Inscription), Pożegnanie września and Złoty środek were printed, however, without the permission of the author. The real debut occurred at the end of the same year with the publishing of a poem without a title (Palce wrzeciona dźwięków…) in Tygodnik Powszechny (#51). Prior to 1955 the poet published some of his works in that newspaper; however, he kept out of the literary environment. Not having the opportunity to publish his own volume of poetry, he decided to publish 22 poems in an anthology of modern Catholic poetry, …każdej chwili wybierać muszę… (Warsaw, 1954).

Herbert was introduced to a wider audience in Premiera pięciu poetów (The debut of five poets) in the magazine Życie Literackie (#51, December 1955). He was presented together with other young poets, such as Miron Białoszewski, Bohdan Drozdowski, Stanisław Czycz and Jerzy Harasymowicz. In 1956 he published his debut book of poetry Struna światła (Chord of Light) and a year later a further volume Hermes, pies i gwiazda (Hermes, Dog and Star). Herbert's relatively late debut meant that he belonged to the modern generation in literature which appeared after 1956, whereas biographically he belonged to the same generation as Krzysztof Kamil Baczyński and Tadeusz Różewicz.

Another two books of poetry: Studium przedmiotu (Study of the Object) and Napis (Inscription) were published in 1961 and 1969. In 1974 the main character from another book of poetry Pan Cogito (Mr. Cogito) appeared in Polish culture. The character of Pan Cogito also appeared in later works of the author. Herbert liked to use poetic personae (which cannot be identified with the author) and multistage irony – the introduction of a character favoured the game played by the author between himself and the reader.

In 1983 the Literary Institute in Paris published another book of poetry by Herbert entitled Raport z oblężonego Miasta i inne wiersze (Report from a Besieged City and Other Poems). In Poland it was reprinted by underground publishing houses. The time and the circumstances favored a literal understanding of the poem's title, which led to simplistic interpretations of the poem. Another book of poems Elegia na odejście (Elegy for the Departure) (1990) was also published in Paris. In 1992, back in Poland, Herbert published Rovigo (Wrocław). Finally, the poet's last work, Epilog burzy (Epilogue to a Storm), came out shortly before his death.

Herbert often uses elements of mythology, medieval heroes and works of art in his writing, which attracted the attention of the critics. Those elements, however, are not the dead parts of literary convention. Herbert uses the mechanism of special demythologization – he tries to get rid of any cultural layers (if possible) and reach the prototypes, face the antique heroes. In his literary output the past is not treated as something distant or closed – revived characters and events make possible an attempt at understanding not only history but also the current moment. The past is a measure of the present.

In Herbert's poetry there is no consistent historiosophic conception. Quite the opposite – there is a clear rejection of systems which clarify everything, which explain a course of events as the inevitable logic of history. Everything that can be said about history is a result of a simple observation – namely, that history is (or at least has been so far) an area where evil is rife, which is accompanied by a handful of indomitable people constantly opposed to it. An individual is not able to change the course of history, but is obliged to put up a hopeless resistance despite everything. The ethical base of Herbert's artistic work constitutes the conviction that the justice of a particular matter, and the actions taken in its defence, do not depend on the chance of victory. This pathetic message is accompanied by an ironic consciousness of the fact that it is delivered in a not very heroic period – a period in which a potential hero is exposed not so much to martyrdom as to ridicule. Characteristic of the contemporary world is a fuzzy borderline between good and evil, the degeneration of language, which deprives words of their clear-cut nature, and the common debasement of values. Contemporary evil is not demonic and cannot be easily defined. The hero, being aware of his own ridiculousness, provokes critical situations not only to preserve the faithfulness of the message but also in order to provoke and force evil to reveal its real nature.

But this hard assessment of the present does not mean idealizing history. The experiences of the last war have put an end to the naïve perception of the past. The exposer's suspicion arises because visions of history are created usually by the winners' chroniclers. Therefore, "what lies under the fresco" (Przemiany Liwiusza — Transformations of Livy) must be diligently analyzed. The monumental picture of ancient heroes may be false, or in other ways – it can be based on judging criteria, which should not be acknowledged uncritically. It may be the vanquished who are entitled to our solidarity.

In Herbert's view the field of history, although perhaps the easiest one on which to make observations, is not the only one in which evil reveals itself. The presence of evil entails the question of life's meaning and order, and of the presence of God in the world. The history of literature has not yet settled the dispute over the sacred in Herbert's poetry. In his earliest volumes one can see two completely different images of God: at one point he is almighty, cold, perfect and remote, at another rendered powerless by descending from heaven Kapłan (Priest), Rozmyślania Pana Cogito o odkupieniu (Mr. Cogito's Reflections on Redemption). The first God is rather disliked, like all abstractions; everything that is valued in this poetry is small, tangible and close. After all, it is nothing else but the senses, especially the most unerring touch, which give us the most reliable support in everyday life. Moreover, in this poetry, one has never reconciled oneself to the collapse of the sacred, or to the world of chaos. Against everything, being loyal – even to the dead God – make sense. For want of any other refuge, we are supposed to seek the power within us to save the world from chaos and nothingness Napis (Inscription).

In his later works, there are fewer such pagan declarations, yet the need for reconciliation is articulated more and more clearly. Compared to the poems from Epilog Burzy (Epilogue to the Storm) and his previous works, Puste Niebo Pana Cogito was not well received by critics.

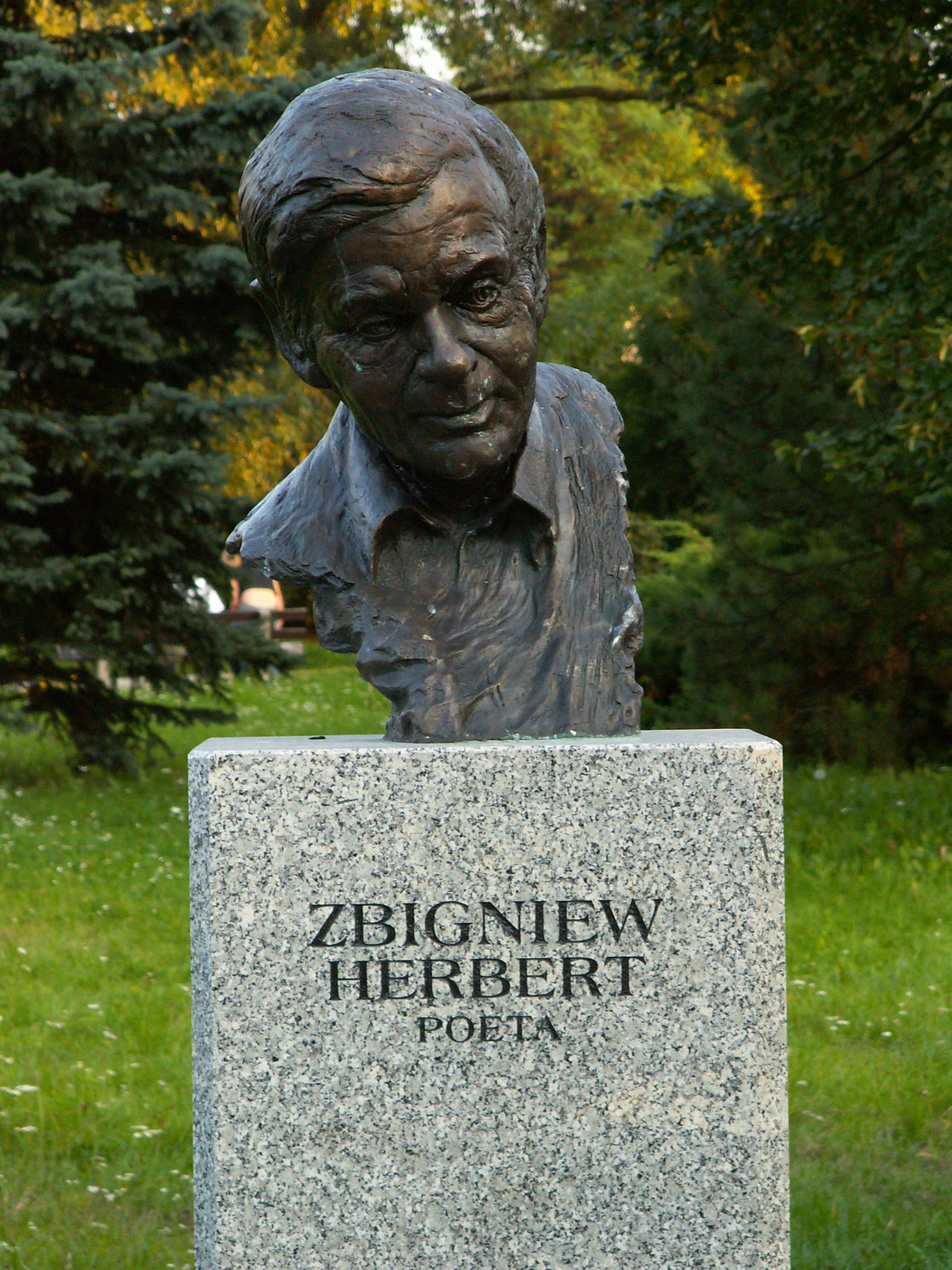
Statue of Zbigniew Herbert in Kielce, Poland

==== Poetic style ====
In his works he presents a perspective of 'intellectual reflection', with a stress on human beings and their dignity, on the background of history, where people are almost irrelevant cogs in the machine of fate. He often used elements of Mediterranean culture in his works.

"Herbert's steadily detached, ironic and historically minded style represents, I suppose, a form of classicism. But it is a one-sided classicism (....) In a way, Herbert's poetry is typical of the whole Polish attitude to their position within the communist bloc; independent, brilliant, ironic, wary, a bit contemptuous, pained." – A. Alvarez, Under Pressure (1965)

"If the key to contemporary Polish poetry is the selective experience of the last decades, Herbert is perhaps the most skillful in expressing it and can be called a poet of historical irony. He achieves a sort of precarious equilibrium by endowing the patterns of civilization with meanings, in spite of all its horrors." – Czesław Miłosz, Postwar Polish Poetry (3rd ed., 1983)

"There is little doubt that at this writing Zbigniew Herbert is the most admired and respected poet now living in Poland. (...) Polish readers have always revered poets who succeed in defining the nation's spiritual dilemma; what is exceptional in Herbert is that his popularity at home is matched by a wide acclaim abroad." – Stanisław Barańczak, A Fugitive from Utopia (1987)

In modern poetry, Herbert advocated semantic transparency. In a talk given at a conference organized by the journal "Odra" he said:

"So not having pretensions to infallibility, but stating only my predilections, I would like to say that in contemporary poetry the poems that appeal to me the most are those in which I discern something I would call a quality of semantic transparency (a term borrowed from Husserl's logic). This semantic transparency is the characteristic of a sign consisting in this: that during the time when the sign is used, attention is directed towards the object denoted, and the sign itself does not hold the attention. The word is a window onto reality."

=== Essays ===
Barbarzyńca w ogrodzie (Barbarian in the Garden), the result of Herbert's first trip abroad, was published in 1962. It is composed of essays which describe particular places and things that have been seen by the poet, as well as two historical essays – accounts of the Albigensians and the persecution of the Templar order. The journey takes place in two dimensions simultaneously – it is both contemporary travel and time travel. The latter starts with prehistory, in the Lascaux caves, and travels through the age of Greek and Roman antiquity, the days of Gothic cathedrals, Renaissance painting and sentimental gardens. The journey becomes fascinating because the traveler shares with his readers the knowledge of both the less and the more serious history of the places, items and people portrayed in the essays. Herbert himself defined it as a journey not only to places, but also to books.

The Albigensian crusade and the collapse of the Knights Templars absorbed Herbert not because of their peculiarity, but quite the opposite, namely because of their ubiquity in history. Both are described by the poet with proper respect for historical detail and the drama of the individuals involved, thereby revealing the timeless mechanisms of crime.

Another collection of essays, Martwa natura z wędzidłem (Still Life with a Bridle), published in 1993, is devoted to seventeenth-century Dutch painting. Just as in Barbarzyńca w ogrodzie, here widely accepted assessments have no impact on the author's personal preferences. Among Dutch painters, the one who fascinates Herbert the most is the hardly known Torrentius, whose work Martwa natura z wędzidłem is the only one to be preserved. In this volume of essays the figure of the traveler is less noticeable than previously. But people still arouse Herbert's interest – not only painters, but also those who were buying and often ordering their works – since Dutch painting is typical of a certain civilization and could not exist in any other place or time.

Although written much earlier than Martwa natura z wędzidłem, the last volume of essays Labirynt nad morzem (Labyrinth on the Sea-Shore) was published only after the poet's death. Herbert gave this volume to the Czytelnik publishing house in 1968, but later withdrew it. Labirynt nad morzem consists mainly of essays devoted to ancient Greek culture and history, as well as in a lesser degree to the Etruscans and the Roman legionnaires from Hadrian's wall. This time, however, the traveler seems not to be seeking his own way – he deals with cultural monuments such as the Acropolis of Athens or Knossos. Yet when addressing the history of Greece, Herbert focuses on episodes which occupy few pages in textbooks, and subverts established patterns. He shows how Pericles' policy towards Samos became the beginning of the end of not only the union of Greek cities but also of Athenian democracy. The assessments of history are reviewed in the same way as in the poetry – by changing the perspective, rejecting the winners' point of view. It is in Labirynt nad morzem where this is most visible.

=== Dramas ===
All Herbert's dramas were written relatively early. The first four dramas were written between the years 1956 and 1961; the last one, the monodrama Listy naszych czytelników (Letters from Our Readers), was written in 1972. Some of these works were created as radio plays, or later, adapted for radio. We can observe this in their structure as tension is produced mainly by means of sound (main characters' voices, sounds in the background, or silence); other theatrical devices appear to a lesser degree. The poet himself used the term "drama for voices".

Jaskinia filozofów (Cave of Philosophers), probably the most valued among all Herbert's dramas, and Rekonstrukcja poety (The Reconstruction of the Poet), deal with antiquity. The plot of Jaskinia filozofów is set in an Athenian prison cell, where the main character, Socrates, waits for his death sentence. Conversations held with his students, wife and warder let him conduct an examination of his life. However, this is not the only theme brought up in the drama. Socrates could easily escape if he wants, as the death penalty was intended to be token. Those by whom he was sentenced presume that he will escape, and they see to it that he has that possibility. Yet the philosopher does not reconcile himself to the hypocrisy of freedom without actual freedom – he goes to extremes and finally resigns himself to death. Rekonstrukcja poety refers to Homer. The author of great epics, being already blind, alters his view into something vital and worthy of interest – he no longer deals with the clamor of battle, but with detail, that which is considered to be most personal and fragile.

The remaining three dramas deal with more contemporary themes. The way of showing the ordinariness and triviality of situations in which evil reveals itself is extremely convincing. One can crave another's room so much as to wish a neighbour's death or even to contribute to it (Drugi pokój (The Other Room)). One can be deprived of everything that matters in life, as a result of inhuman regulations and human stupidity (Listy naszych czytelników (Letters From Our Readers)). In a small normal town, among respectable people, a murder can happen which no one is able to explain, and which no one attempted to stop (Lalek).

== Awards and prizes ==
According to a note made by the secret police (SB) agent in the Polish Union of Writers (Związek Literatów Polskich) Herbert was a candidate for the 1968 Nobel Prize in Literature along with another Polish writer Witold Gombrowicz. This information was provided by the Nobel committee secretary who was visiting Poland at that time. A historian from the Instytut Pamięci Narodowej Rafał Sierchuła speculates that the communist government in Poland may have made active attempts to prevent them from receiving the prize, due to their anti-communist opinions.

- Nagroda Pierścienia Award (Polish Student Union) (1961)
- Kościelski Prize (Geneva) (1963)
- Jurzykowski Prize (1965)
- Nikolaus Lenau Prize (1965)
- Austrian State Prize for European Literature (1965)
- Herder Prize (Austria) (1973)
- Petrarca-Preis (Germany) (1979)
- Nagroda Literacka im. Andrzeja Struga Award (1981)
- 'Solidarity' Prize (1984)
- Mikołaj Sęp Szarzyński Poetry Award (1984)
- International Literary Prize of the Arts Council of Wales (1984)
- The Hungarian Foundation of Prince Gabor Bethlem Prize (1987)
- The Bruno Schulz Prize (American Foundation of Polish – Jewish Studies and American Pen Club) (1988)
- K. Szczęsny PEN Club Award (1989)
- Jan Parandowski Polish PEN Club Prize (1990)
- Jerusalem Prize for the Freedom of the Individual in Society (Israel) (1991)
- Vilenica International Literary Prize (1991)
- Kazimierz Wyka Award (1993)
- German Critics' Award for the best book of the year (Martwa Natura z Wędzidłem | Still Life with Bridle) (1994)
- The Ingersoll Foundation's T. S. Eliot Award for Creative Writing (1995)
- City of Münster Award (Germany) (1996)

== Legacy ==
In 2000, an annual cultural festival, known as Herbertiada, was established in the port city of Kołobrzeg, northern Poland. It is dedicated to the memory of Zbigniew Herbert and his literary legacy. Various events, competitions and performances are organized, including two days that are devoted to workshops for young poets and recitations. The same year, Herbert was the subject of a documentary film Obywatel Poeta (Poet Citizen) directed by Jerzy Zalewski for TVP.

The Zbigniew Herbert International Literary Award is an award for lifetime achievement given to a living poet writing in any language. It was established in 2012 in honor of Zbigniew Herbert by his widow, Katarzyna Dzieduszycka-Herbert. The award has been given to W.S. Merwin, Charles Simic, Ryszard Krynicki, and Lars Gustafsson.

The Parliament of Poland declared the "Year of Zbigniew Herbert" on two occasions: 2008 and 2018.

From May 2024, some Herbert's manuscripts (poems The Message of Mr Cogito, Nike Who Hesitates and Elegy of Fortinbras) are presented at a permanent exhibition in the Palace of the Commonwealth.

== Bibliography ==
=== Herbert's works ===
Each year links to its corresponding "[year] in poetry" article, for poetry, or "[year] in literature" article for other works:

==== Poetry ====
- 1956: Struna światła ("Chord of Light"), Warsaw: Czytelnik
- 1957: Hermes, pies i gwiazda ("Hermes, Dog and Star"), Warsaw: Czytelnik
- 1961: Studium przedmiotu ("A Study of the Object"), Warsaw: Czytelnik
- 1969: Napis ("Inscription"), Warsaw: Czytelnik
- 1974: Pan Cogito ("Mr. Cogito"), Warsaw: Czytelnik
- 1983: Raport z oblężonego Miasta i inne wiersze ("Report from the Besieged City and Other Poems"), Paris: Instytut Literacki
- 1990: Elegia na odejście ("Elegy for the Departure"), Paris: Instytut Literacki
- 1992: Rovigo, Wrocław: Wydawnictwo Dolnośląskie
- 1998: Epilog burzy ("Epilogue to a Storm"), Wrocław: Wydawnictwo Dolnośląskie
- 1998: 89 wierszy, ("89 Poems"), Kraków: a5
- 1999: Podwójny oddech. Prawdziwa historia nieskończonej miłości. Wiersze dotąd niepublikowane, Gdynia: Małgorzata Marchlewska Wydawnictwo (posthumous)

==== Essays, stories ====
- 1962: Barbarzyńca w ogrodzie ("Barbarian in the Garden"), Warsaw: Czytelnik
- 1993: Martwa natura z wędzidłem ("Still Life with Bridle"), Wrocław 1993. (Wydawnictwo Dolnośląskie)
- 2000: Labirynt nad morzem ("Labyrinth on the Sea-Shore"), Warsaw: Zeszyty Literackie (posthumous)
- 2001: Król mrówek ("King of the Ants"), Kraków: Wydawnictwo a5 (posthumous)
- 2001: Węzeł gordyjski oraz inne pisma rozproszone 1948–1998 ("The Gordian Knot and Other Scattered Writings"), P.Kądziela, Warsaw: Biblioteka ‘Więź’ (posthumous)

==== Drama ====
- 1956: 'Jaskinia filozofów' ("Cave of Philosophers"), Twórczość 1956, # 9.
- 1958: 'Drugi pokój' ("The Other Room"), Dialog, # 4.
- 1960: 'Rekonstrukcja poetry' ("The Reconstruction of the Poet"), Więzi, # 11/12.
- 1961: 'Lalek. Sztuka na głosy', Dialog, # 12.
- 1972: 'Listy naszych czytelników' ("Letters From Our Reader"), Dialog, # 11.
- 'Dramaty' ("Drama"), Wrocław: Wydawnictwo Dolnośląskie (posthumous)

==== Correspondence ====
- Listy do Muzy. Prawdziwa historia nieskończonej miłości, Gdynia 2000. (Małgorzata Marchlewska Wydawnictwo) (Without the permission of heiresses of the copyrights.)
- 'Kochane Zwierzątka...' Listy Zbigniewa Herberta do przyjaciół – Magdaleny i Zbigniewa Czajkowskich, editor: Magdalena Czajkowska, Warsaw 2000 (Państwowy Instytut Wydawniczy)
- Zbigniew Herbert. Jerzy Zawieyski. Korespondencja 1949–1967, introduction: Jacek Łukasiewicz, choice and footnotes: Paweł Kądziela, Warsaw 2002 (Biblioteka ‘Więzi’)
- Zbigniew Herbert. Henryk Elzenberg. Korespondencja, editor: Barbara Toruńczyk, footnotes: Barbara Toruńczyk, Paweł Kądziela, [2002] (Fundacja Zeszytów Literackich)
- Zbigniew Herbert, Jerzy Turowicz. Korespondencja, Kraków 2005 (wydawnictwo a5)
- Zbigniew Herbert, Stanisław Barańczak. Korespondencja, 2005 (Fundacja Zeszytów Literackich)
- Zbigniew Herbert, Czesław Miłosz. Korespondencja, 2006 (Zeszyty Literackie)

==== Study ====
(in chronological order)

- Andrzej Kaliszewski, Pana Cogito, Kraków 1982, Łódź 1990.
- Stanisław Barańczak, Uciekinier z Utopii: o poezji Zbigniewa Herberta (A Fugitive from Utopia: The Poetry of Zbigniew Herbert), Londyn 1984.
- Włodzimierz Maciąg, O poezji Zbigniewa Herberta, Wrocław 1986.
- A. Baczewski, Szkice literackie. Asnyk. Konopnicka. Herbert, Rzeszów 1991.
- Jacek Brzozowski,'Pan Cogito' Zbigniewa Herberta, Warszawa 1991.
- Andrzej Kaliszewski, Herbert, Warszawa 1991.
- Andrzej Kaliszewski, Zbigniew Herbert, Kraków 1993.
- Dlaczego Herbert. Wiersze i komentarze, Łódź 1992.
- Barbara Myrdzik, Poezja Zbigniewa Herberta w recepcji maturzystów, Lublin 1992.
- Czytanie Herberta, red. Przemysław Czapliński, Piotr Śliwiński, Maria Wiegandt, Poznań 1995.
- Jacek Łukasiewicz, Poezja Zbigniewa Herberta Warszawa 1995. (Biblioteka Analiz Literackich)
- Marek Adamiec, '...Pomnik trochę niezupełny...'. Rzecz o apokryfach i poezji Herberta, Gdańsk 1996.
- Danuta Opacka-Walasek, '...pozostać wiernym niepewnej jasności'. Wybrane problemy poezji Zbigniewa Herberta, Katowice 1996.
- Piotr Siemaszko, Zmienność i trwanie. (O eseistyce Zbigniewa Herberta), Bydgoszcz 1996.
- Andrzej Franaszek, Ciemne źródło (o twórczości Zbigniewa Herberta), Londyn 1998.
- Poznawanie Herberta, wybór i wstęp A. Franaszek, Tom 1 – Kraków 1998, Tom 2 – Kraków 2000.
- Herbert i znaki czasu. Tom I. Colloquia Herbertiana (I), red. Elżbieta Feliksiak, Mariusz Leś, Elżbieta Sidoruk, Białystok 2001.
- Julian Kornhauser, Uśmiech Sfinksa. O poezji Zbigniewa Herberta, Kraków 2001.
- Jacek Łukasiewicz, Herbert, Wrocław 2001. (Seria: A to Polska właśnie)
- Jadwiga Mizińska, Herbert Odyseusz, Lublin 2001.
- Danuta Opacka-Walasek, Czytając Herberta, Katowice 2001.
- Joanna Salamon, Czas Herberta albo na dom w Czarnolesie, Warszawa 2001.
- Twórczość Zbigniewa Herberta. Studia, red. Marzena Woźniak-Łabieniec, Jerzy Wiśniewski, Kraków 2001.
- Herbert. Poetyka, wartości i konteksty, red. Eugeniusz Czaplejewicz i Witold Sadowski, Warszawa 2002.
- Joanna Siedlecka, Pan od poezji. O Zbigniewie Herbercie, Warszawa 2002 (fragment)
- Bohdan Urbankowski, Poeta, czyli człowiek zwielokrotniony. Szkice o Zbigniewie Herbercie, Radom 2004
- Roman Bobryk, Koncept poezji i poetry w wierszach Zbigniewa Herberta, Siedlce 2017.

Seria wydawnicza Biblioteka Pana Cogito

- Ruszar J.M., Stróż brata swego. Zasada odpowiedzialności w liryce Zbigniewa Herberta, Wydawnictwo UMCS, Lublin 2004.
- Portret z początku wieku. Twórczość Zbigniewa Herberta – kontynuacje i rewizje, red. W. Ligęza, M. Cicha, Wydawnictwo Gaudium, Lublin 2005.
- Czułość dla Minotaura. Metafizyka i miłość konkretu w twórczości Zbigniewa Herberta, red. J.M. Ruszar, M. Cicha, Wydawnictwo Gaudium, Lublin 2005.
- Wyraz wyłuskany z piersi, Wydawnictwo Gaudium, Lublin 2006: część 1: Herbert w oczach zachodnich literaturoznawców. Materiały z Międzynarodowej Konferencji Naukowej Ośrodka Kultury Polskiej przy Uniwersytecie Paris-Sorbonne (jesień 2004), red. D. Knysz-Tomaszewska, B. Gautier; część 2: „Pamięć i tożsamość”. Materiały z Warsztatów Herbertowskich w Oborach (wiosna 2005), red. M. Zieliński, J.M. Ruszar.
- Zmysł wzroku, zmysł sztuki. Prywatna historia sztuki Zbigniewa Herberta. Materiały z Warsztatów Herbertowskich w Oborach (jesień 2005), cz. 1 i 2, red. J.M. Ruszar, D. Koman, Wydawnictwo Gaudium, Lublin 2006.
- Dialog i spór. Zbigniew Herbert a inni poeci i eseiści. Materiały z Warsztatów Herbertowskich w Oborach (wiosna 2006), red. J.M. Ruszar, D. Koman, Wydawnictwo Gaudium, Lublin 2006.
- Apostoł w podróży służbowej. Prywatna historia sztuki Zbigniewa
- erberta (album rysunków poety oraz reprodukcji dzieł malarskich, które były inspiracją dla wierszy i esejów), red. J.M. Ruszar, Wydawnictwo Gaudium, Lublin 2006.
- Zawistowska-Toczek D., Stary poeta. Ars moriendi w późnej twórczości
- bigniewa Herberta, Wydawnictwo Gaudium, Lublin 2008.
- Mazurkiewicz-Szczyszek A., W asyście jakich dzwonów. Obrazy miasta w
- wórczości Zbigniewa Herberta, Wydawnictwo Gaudium, Lublin 2008.
- Niepewna jasność tekstu. Szkice o twórczości Zbigniewa Herberta, red. J.M. Ruszar, Wydawnictwo Platan, Kraków 2009.
- Antoniuk M., Otwieranie głosu. Studium o wczesnej twórczości Zbigniewa Herberta (do 1957 roku), Wydawnictwo Platan, Kraków 2009.
- Pojęcia kiełkujące z rzeczy. Filozoficzne inspiracje twórczości Zbigniewa Herberta, red. J.M. Ruszar, Wydawnictwo Platan, Kraków 2010.
- Bór nici. Wątki klasyczne i romantyczne w twórczości Zbigniewa Herberta, red. M. Mikołajczak, Wydawnictwo Platan, Kraków 2011.
- Sztukiecka G., Umrę cały? Rozmowy w cieniu śmierci. Senilna poezja Czesława Miłosza, Tadeusza Różewicza, Zbigniewa Herberta i Jarosława Marka Rymkiewicza, Narodowe Centrum Kultury, Warszawa 2011.
- Ewangelia odrzuconego. Szkice w 90. rocznicę urodzin Tadeusza Różewicza, red. J.M. Ruszar, Narodowe Centrum Kultury, Warszawa 2011.
- Między nami a światłem. Bóg i świat w twórczości Zbigniewa Herberta, szkice pod red. G. Halkiewicz-Sojak, J.M. Ruszara i R. Siomy, Wydawnictwo JMR Transatlantyk, Kraków-Toruń 2012
- Małgorzata Mikołajczak, Światy z marzenia. Echa romantyczne w poezji Zbigniewa Herberta, Wydawnictwo JMR Transatlantyk, Kraków 2013

W przygotowaniu:

- Śniedziewska M., Wierność rzeczywistości. Zbigniew Herbert o postawie wobec świata i problemach jego reprezentacji (rozprawa i album), Wydawnictwo JMR Transatlantyk, Kraków 2013.
- Patrzeć aż do zawrotu głowy. Zbigniew Herbert wobec europejskiego dziedzictwa (szkice i album), red. J.M. Rusza, Wydawnictwo JMR Transatlantyk, Kraków 2013r.

=== English translations ===
- Selected Poems, translators: Czesław Miłosz and Peter Dale Scott, with an introduction by Al Alvarez, Penguin Modern European Poets, 1968 reprinted by The Ecco Press in 1986.
- Barbarian in the Garden, translators: Michael March and Jarosław Anders, Harcourt Brace & Company, 1985
- Report From the Besieged City, translators: John Carpenter and Bogdana Carpenter, The Ecco Press, 1985.
- Still Life with a Bridle: Essays and Apocrypha, translators: John Carpenter and Bogdana Carpenter, The Ecco Press, 1991.
- Mr. Cogito, translators: John Carpenter and Bogdana Carpenter, The Ecco Press, 1993.
- Elegy for the Departure, translators: John Carpenter and Bogdana Carpenter, The Ecco Press, 1999.
- The King of the Ants, translators: John Carpenter and Bogdana Carpenter, The Ecco Press, 1999.
- The Collected Poems: 1956–1998, translators: Czesław Miłosz, Peter Dale Scott and Alissa Valles, edited by Alissa Valles, with an introduction by Adam Zagajewski, The Ecco Press, 2007.
- Zbigniew Herbert, Selected Poems, translators: Czesław Miłosz, Peter Dale Scott, John and Bogdana Carpenter, selected by: Tomasz Kunz, afterword by: John and Bogdana Carpenter, Wydawnictwo Literackie, 2007.
- Polish Writers on Writing featuring Zbigniew Herbert. Edited by Adam Zagajewski (Trinity University Press, 2007).
- The Collected Prose: 1948–1998, translators: Michael March and Jarosław Anders, John and Bogdana Carpenter and Alissa Valles, edited and introduction by Alissa Vallys, with preface by Charles Simic. Ecco, 2010.

== See also ==
- Polish literature
- List of Polish poets
