= Mr. Cogito =

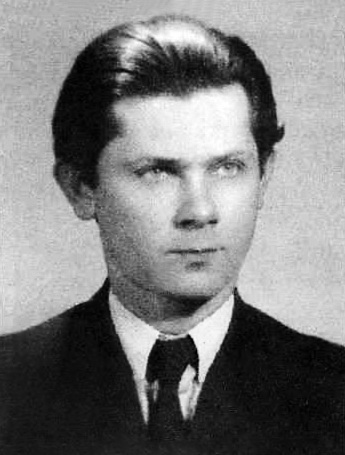
Zbigniew Herbert

Mr. Cogito (Polish: Pan Cogito) is a character created by Polish poet and essayist Zbigniew Herbert (1924–1998). He first appears in a poem entitled "The Envoy of Mr. Cogito" (Przesłanie Pana Cogito) published in 1973. Mr. Cogito is also the title of a collection of poems by Herbert published in 1974.

== Description ==
Initially Mr. Cogito was an Everyman, a universal element of humanity sharing his opinions on various aspects of life and existence. However, the more he says, the more disembodied he appears, and becomes transformed into an ethical symbol and a metaphor of the tough choices we have to make between good and evil.

The character's name originates from Descartes' famous phrase, "Cogito ergo sum." Mr. Cogito appears in the following books of poetry by Herbert:

- Mr. Cogito (1974)
- Report From A Besieged City and Other Poems (1983)
- Elegy for the Departure (1990)
- Rovigo (1992)
- Epilogue to a Storm (1998)

== Mr. Cogito ==
"Mr. Cogito" is a book of poems by Zbigniew Herbert. First published in 1974, the first mention of its possible release dates back to 1969. Four years later, in January 1973, the Catholic weekly "Tygodnik Powszechny" published to great popular acclaim one poem from the planned volume, the iconic "Przesłanie Pana Cogito" ("The Message of Mr. Cogito").

The collection ultimately consisted of 40 poems, which build up the drama around its single main character, Mr. Cogito. Mr. Cogito, who is involved in all the monologues and dialogues in the book, invites a range of various interpretations, including cultural and historical ones. True to the Cartesian overtones of his name, Mr. Cogito often reflects on life and the world, providing the reader with the thoughtful statements. Coming from an Everyman, they attain a range of universal meanings.

The first poem in the collection is entitled "Pan Cogito obserwuje w lustrze swoją twarz" ("Mr Cogito Looks at His Face in a Mirror"). A poem about aging, it poses questions about the limits of individual freedom. The second, "O dwu nogach Pana Cogito" ("On Mr. Cogito's Two Legs") concerns the duality of human personality. The third, "Pan Cogito a perła" ("Mr. Cogito and a Pearl") – an unrhymed narrative of a pearl stuck in Mr. Cogito's shoe, treated as a metaphor of having to face life's adversities. The next poems – "Pan Cogito myśli o powrocie do rodzinnego miasta" ("Mr. Cogito Considers Returning to His Native Town"), "Pan Cogito rozmyśla o cierpieniu" ("Mr. Cogito Meditates on Suffering") and "Przepaść Pana Cogito" ("The Abyss of Mr. Cogito") depict Mr. Cogito confronting various existential dilemmas. Existential problems are a presence throughout the collection, appearing in the following texts:

- "Pan Cogito a myśl czysta" ("Mr. Cogito and Pure Thought")
- "Pan Cogito czyta gazetę" ("Mr. Cogito Reads A Newspaper")
- "Pan Cogito a ruch myśli" (" Mr. Cogito and the Motion of Thought")
- "Domy przedmieścia" ("Houses on the Outskirts of the City")
- "Alienacje Pana Cogito" ("Mr. Cogito's Alienations")
- "Pan Cogito obserwuje zmarłego przyjaciela" ("Mr. Cogito Watches a Deceased Friend")
- "Późnojesienny wiersz Pana Cogito przeznaczony dla kobiecych pism" ("Mr. Cogito's Late Autumn Poem For Women's Magazines")
- "Pan Cogito rozważa różnice między głosem ludzkim a głosem przyrody" ("Mr. Cogito Considers the Difference Between the Human Voice and the Voice of Nature")
- "Pan Cogito biada nad małością snów" (Mr. Cogito Laments on the Pettiness of Dreams")
- "Pan Cogito a poeta w pewnym wieku" ("Mr. Cogito and a Poet of a Certain Age")
- "Pan Cogito a pop" ("Mr Cogito And Pop Music")
- "Pan Cogito o magii" ("Mr. Cogito on Magic")
- "Pan Cogito spotyka w Luwrze posążek Wielkiej Matki" ("Mr. Cogito Encounters A Figurine of the Great Mother in the Louvre")
- "Pan Cogito opowiada o kuszeniu Spinozy" ("Mr. Cogito Narrates The Temptation of Spinoza")
- "Pan Cogito otrzymuje czasem dziwne listy" ("Mr Cogito Occasionally Receives Strange Letters")
- "Rozmyślania Pana Cogito o odkupieniu" ("Mr Cogito's Meditations on Redemption")
- "Pan Cogito szuka rady" ("Mr. Cogito Seeks Advice")
- "Gra Pana Cogito" ("Mr. Cogito's Game"), "Co myśli Pan Cogito o piekle" ("What Mr. Cogito Thinks About Hell")
- "Pan Cogito o postawie wyprostowanej" ("Mr Cogito on the Upright Position")
- "Przesłanie Pana Cogito" ("The Message of Mr Cogito").

== Report From A Besieged City and Other Poems ==
This poetry collection was published in Paris in 1983. An allusion to the state of martial law imposed in Poland by the Communist junta, it was officially unpublishable in Poland. A few months later an underground edition was published by a clandestine press in Poland, and no legal edition was available until 1992.

It includes another twelve poems featuring Mr. Cogito, whose presence is introduced by a poem entitled "Dusza Pana Cogito" (Mr. Cogito's Soul). It brings to our attention Mr Cogito's soul leading a life of its own. In contrast with the souls of the ancient world, it tends to leave him unexpectedly, wandering here and there, oblivious of the owner's well-being. The soul always returns, though, making it possible for Mr. Cogito to adore the world's beauty and diversity in the next poem – "Modlitwa Pana Cogito – podróżnika" ("A Prayer of Mr. Cogito The Traveller"). This is followed by "Pan Cogito – powrót" ("Mr. Cogito – A Return"), which unequivocally identifies the character with the poet for the very first time in the oeuvre. It mentions his return to his homeland, and the other poems in the collection treat about various aspects of Mr. Cogito's being – imagination ("Mr. Cogito and the Imagination"), longevity ("Mr. Cogito and Longevity"), virtue ("Mr. Cogito on Virtue"), eschatological concepts ("Mr. Cogito's Eschatological Premonitions"), bloodshed ("Mr. Cogito Thinks about Blood"), a contact with Maria Rasputin ("Mr. Cogito and Maria Rasputin – an Attempt at Contact"), the need for precision ("Mr. Cogito on the Need for Precision), the notes from a house of the dead ("Mr. Cogito – Notes from a Dead House") and Mr. Cogito's monster ("The Monster of Mr. Cogito"). This last text – The Monster of Mr. Cogito – concerns the inmost nature of each and every human being and/or merciless fate.

== Elegy for the Departure ==
This collection, published in 1990 in Paris and then, two years later, in Poland, seems to be a summary of the Herbert's artistic activity far away from Poland.

== Rovigo ==
This volume is regarded by some as a second valedictory collection in which Hebert takes the opportunity to bid farewell to his friends (the first was his "An Elegy for the Departure"). Two Cogito-related texts may be found there. The first one, dedicated to Władysław Walczykiewicz, is entitled "From Mr. Cogito on the Set Topic: Friends Depart" and bears the weight of nostalgic memories of the old times and companions gone. The second poem – "The Calendars of Mr. Cogito" – has a similar atmosphere. Written for Zbigniew Zapasiewicz, it mentions the feelings accompanying Mr. Cogito, who flicks through his old pocket calendars and finds the forgotten names and notes, covered with the mist of time.

== Epilogue of the Storm ==
"Epilogue of the Storm" was released in 1998 and happened to be the last poetry collection published in Hebert's lifetime. Surprisingly religious, it contains 5 more texts with Mr. Cogito's name in the title. These are: "Pan Cogito a Małe Zwierzątko ("Mr. Cogito and a Small Animal"), "Pan Cogito. Aktualna pozycja duszy" ("Mr. Cogito. The Current Position of the Soul"), "Pan Cogito. Ars longa" ("Mr. Cogito. Ars Longa"), "Pan Cogito. Lekcja kaligrafii" ("Mr. Cogito. A Calligraphy Lesson"), "Zaświaty Pana Cogito" ("The Underworld of Mr. Cogito"). On one hand, they still show Mr. Cogito as willing to change the world around him, but, on the other, they express a final resignation to his fate.

== Mr. Cogito on ethics and Communism ==
Mr. Cogito expressed a longing to resurrect some universal values and to introduce them back to the degraded reality of a Communist-dominated society denuded of all values. Thus, he rejects moral compromise and relativism, criticises the restraints imposed by Communism in Poland, both in the 1970s and later. Herbert's poetry was enormously influential on the attitudes of the Polish intelligentsia of that time.

"The Message of Mr. Cogito" encapsulates a heroic moral code, making the Polish patriots aware that they "were saved not in order to live". They were saved to give testimony and act against the Communistic regime, no matter how "those on their knees and those with their backs turned and those toppled in the dust" behaved "when the light on the mountains was giving the sign".

== Inspired by Mr. Cogito ==
Introducing Mr. Cogito to the Polish culture was fraught with the consequences. The character became a metaphor of indomitable heroism, indifferent to possible exile or death. His attitude caused an international movement in Europe and the United States, establishing "Mr. Cogito's Clubs", where people gain an opportunity to get to know Mr. Cogito's reflections on ethics or existence. Appreciating his value, they may find their own way, leading to becoming a full-fledged human being.

The motif of Everyman has been used in various works of art and literature all around the world. Ludwika Amber and her poems might be a particularly interesting example. Being a Polish poet living in Australia, she wrote about her alter ego inspired by Mr. Cogito, bearing the name of Mrs. Tree ("Pani Drzewo"). It's the main character of "Mrs. Tree tells the story of Australia" ("Pani Drzewo opowiada o Australii", 1994) and "The Talk with Mr. Cogito" ("Rozmowa z Panem Cogito"). She wrote it in 1998, to pay tribute to Zbigniew Herbert, right after hearing the news about his death. However, Amber was not the only one to refer to Mr. Cogito. For instance, he inspired The Russian Graduate Seminar Group, appeared in articles, like the one in Boston Review and became an object of multiple academic and non-academic researches.

Between 1973 and 1919?? Mr. Cogito Magazine appeared in the United States, bringing translations of dissident poetry out of eastern Europe. The magazine was co-edited by John M. Gogol and Robert A. Davies.
