= Jerzy Harasymowicz =

Polish poet (1933–1999)

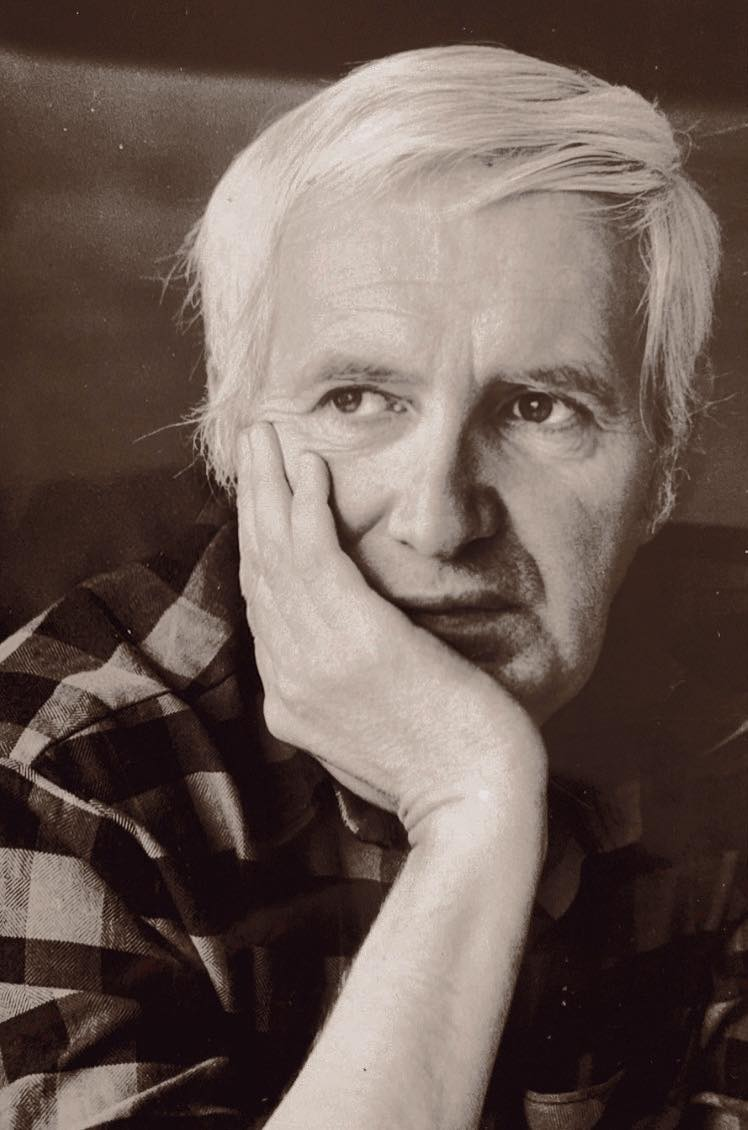
Jerzy Harasymowicz-Broniuszyc

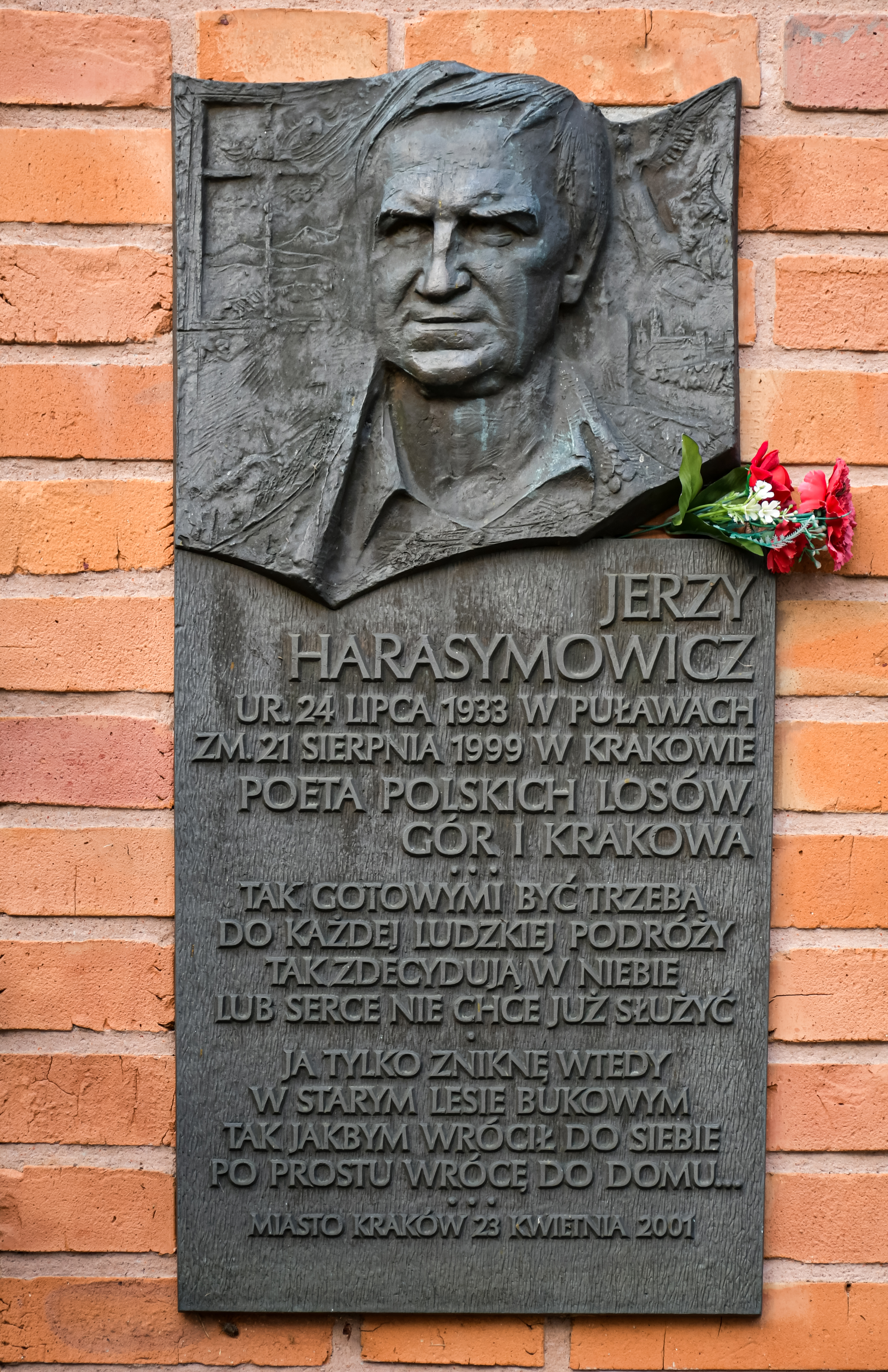
Salwator Cemetery Harasymowicz commemorative plaque

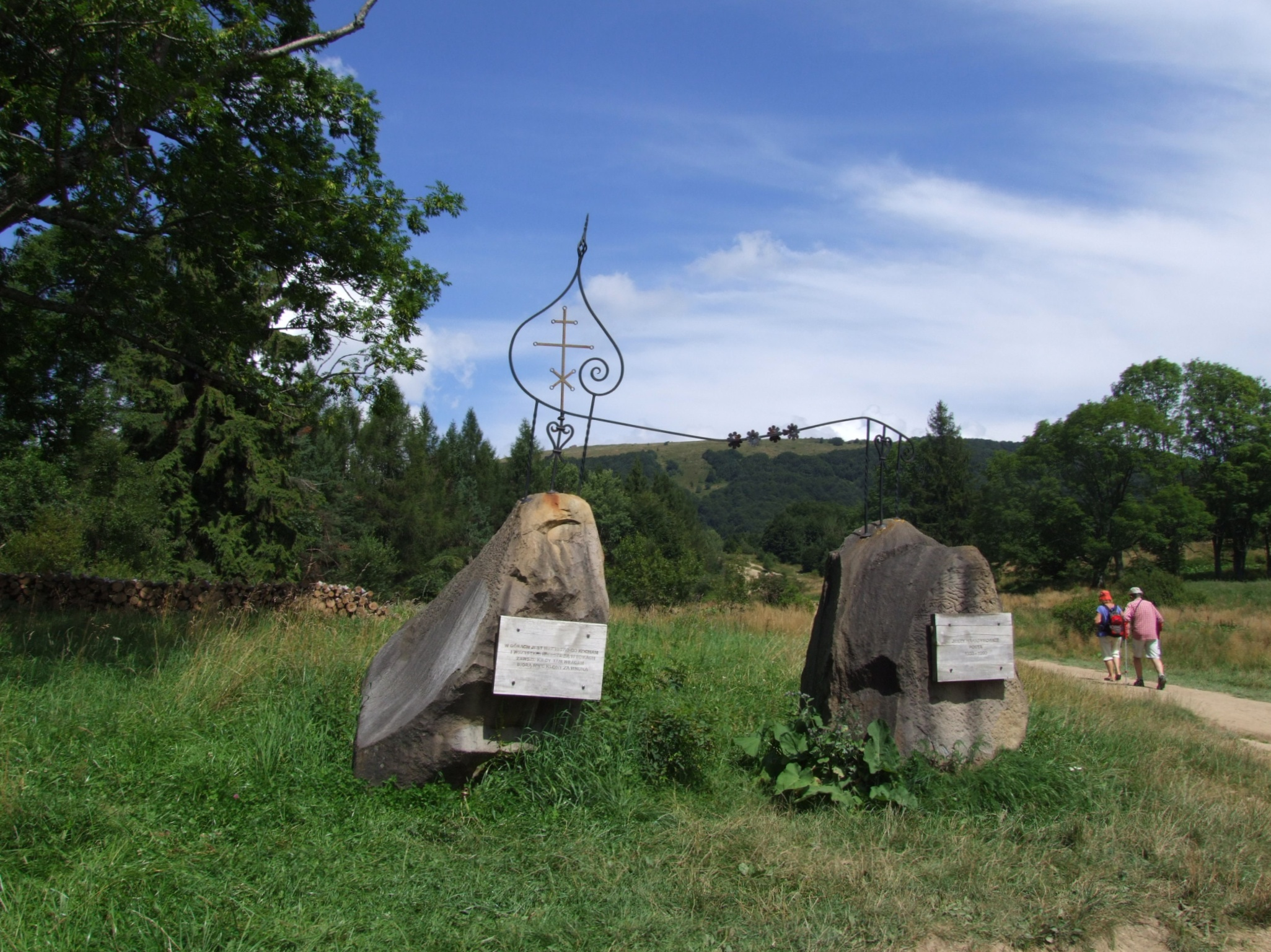
Jerzy Harasymowcz Memorial Bieszczady, Wyżna Pass

Jerzy Harasymowicz-Broniuszyc (born on July 24, 1933, in Puławy, died on August 21, 1999, in Krakow) was a Polish poet, founder of the poetic groups of Muszyna and Barbarus.

He came from a family of mixed Lemko and Polish-German roots.

He belonged to the generation of "Współczesność", he made his debut in 1953 in the weekly “Życie Literackie”, publishing poems and poetic prose. His poems were included in 1955 in the world premiere of five poets, alongside Miron Białoszewski, Zbigniew Herbert, Stanisław Czycz and Bohdan Drozdowski. His first volume of poetry was Miracles published in 1956. He also published in the pages of Creativity, Tygodnik Kulturalny, Tygodnik Powszechny and Dziennik Polski. Harasymowicz was the initiator or protector of several poetic groups: Muszyna (1957-1961), Barbarus (1967-1972) and Tylicz (1969-1976).

Winner of numerous awards, including Awards Stanisław Piętak (1967), Foundation Prizes Kościelski (1971), the main award of the Minister of Culture and Art (1975).

His work was characterized by "oversaturation" of descriptions, which made the mythologies he invented extremely detailed and that made a real impression. He was interested in the culture of the Lemkos and the Slav-Christian culture, to which he often referred to in his works.

From the poetry of Jerzy Harasymowicz comes the term "land of gentleness", to which musician Wojciech Belon referred in his songs, and which later was identified with the sung poetry.

Harasymowicz was a fertile writer, dying, he left over 40 volumes of poems, numerous poems and 2 fairy tales for children sold in total in the number of over 700,000. copies.

In Krakow's environment, he was widely known as a devotee of Półwsia Zwierzyniecki and the bar "Na Stawach" (a famous poem about this bar). At the same time, he declared himself a fanatic [style for improvement] a fan of the Cracovia Sports Club. He wrote poems about Cracovia and its footballers. The most famous is probably the [style to improve] a poem about the goal-keeper directly from the corners in the 2-1 first-league winnings of the Krakow derby of Cezary Tobollik.

After the declaration of martial law, he supported Wojciech Jaruzelski and PZPR; "in the years 1983-84 he published in the press a number of poems in which he praised socialism." After the political transformation, he published in Trybuna [4].

At the end of his life, he was seriously ill and used the hospitality of the Komańcza Forest District, living in a building in Mików, located in the forest inspectorate, near Komańcza. From there, for the last time, he watched his beloved Bieszczady [5].

His ashes were scattered over the Bieszczady meadows [6]
