= Herbertiada =

Annual festival in Kołobrzeg, Poland

Herbertiada is an annual cultural festival and competitions dedicated to the memory of Zbigniew Herbert. Established in 2000, it takes place in Kołobrzeg, Poland. Various events and performances are organized, including two days that are devoted to workshops for young poets and recitations.
