= Miron Białoszewski =

Polish poet, novelist, playwright and actor (1922–1983)

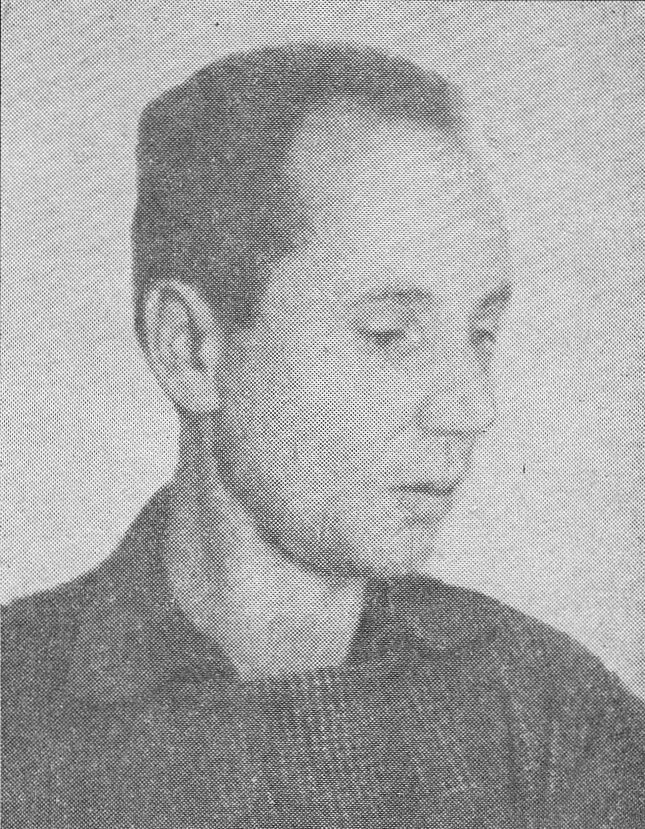
- Miron Białoszewski (1960)
- Born: 30 June 1922; Warsaw
- Died: 17 June 1983 (aged 60); Warsaw
- Occupations: poet, novelist, playwright and actor

Miron Białoszewski (Polish pronunciation: [ˈmirɔn bjawɔˈʂɛfskʲi]; 30 June 1922 – 17 June 1983) was a Polish poet, novelist, playwright and actor.

== Biography ==
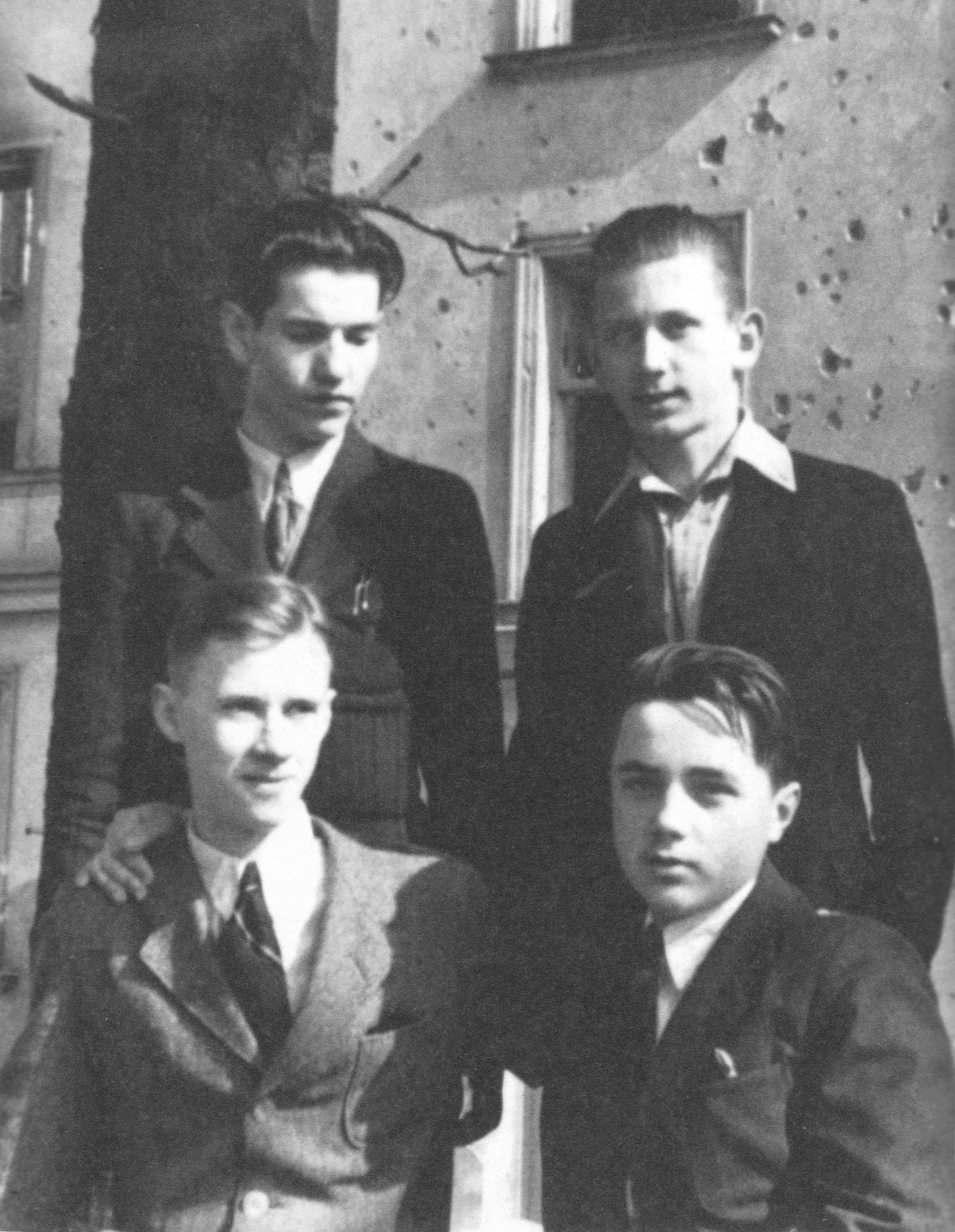
Miron Białoszewski (first on the left in the bottom row) together with his schoolmates during the Occupation

Białoszewski studied linguistics at the clandestine courses of the University of Warsaw during the German occupation of Poland. Following the end of the Warsaw Uprising, he was sent to a labour camp in Lammsdorf, in the Third Reich, and returned to Warsaw at the end of World War II.

First, he worked at the central post office, and then as a journalist for a number of popular magazines, some of them for children. In 1955 Białoszewski took part in the foundation of a small theatre called Teatr na Tarczyńskiej, where he premiered his plays Wiwisekcja and Osmędeusze, and acted in them with Ludmiła Murawska. In the same year Białoszewski debuted in Życie literackie along with Zbigniew Herbert, Bohdan Drozdowski, Jerzy Harasymowicz and Stanisław Czycz. Białoszewski was gay and for many years, he shared an apartment at Pl. Dąbrowskiego 7 with his live-in partner, painter Leszek Soliński.

According to Joanna Nizynska from University of California, Los Angeles:

This most "private" author of postwar Polish literature disregards discourses of history so deeply embedded in the Polish literary tradition; rather he focuses on the mundane aspects of the everyday life, usually from an autobiographical perspective and using an overtly colloquial language. Although Białoszewski's works have stirred many discussions, most of these have focused on his treatment of genres and language...

His highly acclaimed memoir, Pamiętnik z powstania warszawskiego ("Memoir of the Warsaw Uprising") was published in 1970 (and translated into English in 1977). In it, Białoszewski gave a philosophical account of his wartime experiences 27 years after the fact.

Another great example of Białoszewski’s innovative approach to literature and language is Chamowo – another memoir in which he describes one year of his life after suffering from heart attack. Chamowo, written between June 1975 and May 1976, is characterized by vivid descriptions and experimental use of language. The language is vivid, it very often tries to show how regular people communicate in everyday situations, at the same time it can be rich in metaphors and mysterious. Białoszewski depicts his everyday life, where he tries to adapt to new reality of living in a new apartment situated in heretofore unknown part of Warsaw, colloquially called Chamowo, hence the name of the book. The writer describes his recovery, meetings with friends, day-to-day struggles and thoughts. The original manuscript of Chamowo was lost, only some part of typescript had prevailed, as well as a recording that Białoszewski had recorded for his blind friend, Jadwiga Stańczakowa. The book was eventually posthumous published in 2009.

In 1982 he was awarded the Jurzykowski Prize by the New York-based Alfred Jurzykowski Foundation. He befriended Jadwiga Stańczakowa. He died of a heart attack on 17 June 1983. There is a large body of literature devoted to the critical analysis of Białoszewski's works - most notably by such writers and academics as Czesław Miłosz, Maria Janion, Stanisław Barańczak, Jan Błoński, Kazimierz Wyka and Artur Sandauer.

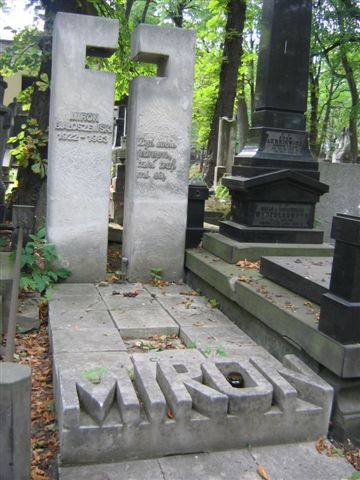
Grave of Miron Białoszewski at Powązki Cemetery in Warsaw.

== Works ==
The number given between square brackets after each book title and year of publication refers to the volume of Białoszewski's Collected Works (Utwory zebrane, Warsaw: Państwowy Instytut Wydawniczy 1987) in which the texts published originally in these books have been reprinted.

=== Poetry ===
- Obroty rzeczy (1956)
- Rachunek zachciankowy (1959)
- Mylne wzruszenia (1961)
- Było i było (1965)
- Wiersze (1976)
- Poezje wybrane (1976)
- Miron Białoszewski [in the series Poeci Polscy ] (1977)
- Odczepić się (1978)
- Wiersze wybrane i dobrane (1980)
- Trzydzieści lat wierszy (1982)
- Oho (1985)

=== Poetry and Prose ===
- Teatr Osobny (1973)
- Rozkurz (1980)
- Stara proza i nowe wiersze (1984)
- Obmapywanie Europy. Aaameryka. Ostatnie wiersze (1988 – posthumously)

=== Prose ===
- Pamiętnik z powstania warszawskiego) (1970)
  English translation by Madeline Levine: A Memoir of the Warsaw Uprising (1977, 1991)
- Donosy rzeczywistości (1973)
- Szumy, zlepy, ciągi (1976)
- Zawał (1977)
- Przepowiadanie sobie (1981)
- Konstancin (1991 – posthumously)
