= Gardzienice =

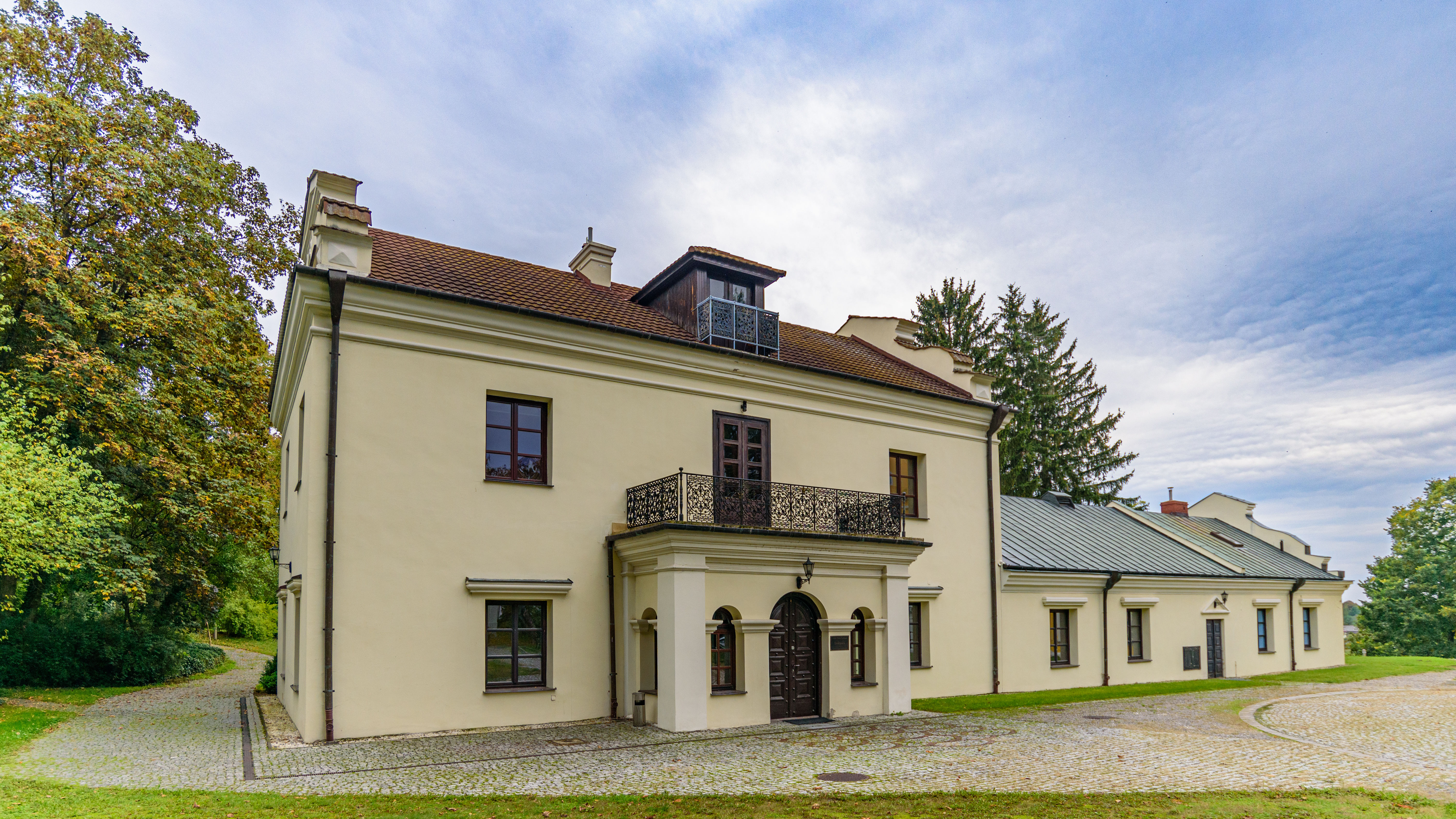
- Interactive map of Gardzienice
- Address: Poland
- Owner: Włodzimierz Staniewski

Construction
- Opened: 1977

Website
- Centre for Theatre Practices "Gardzienice"

Centre for Theatre Practices "Gardzienice" was founded in 1977 by Włodzimierz Staniewski, and formally registered in 1978. The name comes from the village where the theatre is located. The group gained international critical acclaim, and is classified as an experimental anthropological theater. In 1997 the association established the Academy for Theatre Practices. This carries out numerous projects: research, arts, music, and cultural investigation into the humanities.

Włodzimierz Staniewski was a former collaborator of Jerzy Grotowski, and in his choice of just such an isolated environment, Staniewski may have been inspired by his work with Grotwoski in Brzezinka, but with an important difference: rather than emphasising an isolating escape from urban existence, Gardzienice represented for him a pursuit of integrative existence within a community, albeit of a different sort. From the outset, Gardzienice sought to work with the local people, taking interaction with them as both inspiration for a way of life, and for a way of developing performance. It was in this environment that the whole basis for the group's early work, the 'expedition', was born. Staniewski describes the expedition as having "the character of a permanent journey through a chosen territory, with the possibility of not only touching on the culture of people, but also the "culture of the earth" . This may not constitute a strict anthropological exercise in the purely academic sense, and Staniewski may insist on a less clinical term, but at its heart is arguably an interest in the study of people. According to Richard Schechner, Gardzienice constitutes "the very heart and essence of Polish experimental and anthropological performance."

== Constellation ==
Staniewski uses the term "constellation" to describe a particular arrangement of actors/collaborators who come together to create a performance.[48] This is to emphasize the individuality of each actor, who personality contributes to the creation of a work. Each performance is matched to the predisposition of the actor, rather than the other way around. The director builds a constellation for each performance from scratch, inviting actors to cooperate with the Centre. Despite this practice, many artists remain in "Gardzienice" for many years. Staniewski does not look for professional theatre actors (he himself studied Polish language), but what matters is the personality of the candidate. Since the founding of the Academy for Theatre Practices, new actors are recruited mainly from among its graduates. The first constellation in 1977 was created by Staniewski with Henryk Andruszka, Jan Bernad, Tomasz Rodowicz, Waldemar Sidor, Jan Tabaka oraz Wanda Wróbel. Since then, "Gardzienice" has included of over 50 actors, with none but Staniewski remaining from the original group. The longest-standing collaborator is Mariusz Gołaj, who joined the team in 1979.

Company actors in the year 2012:

- Mariusz Gołaj
- Marcin Jan Mrowca
- Joanna Holcgreber
- Anna Maria Dąbrowska
- Agnieszka Mendel
- Paweł Kieszko
- James Brennan

Collaborators:

- Dorota Kołodziej
- Ivor Houlker
- Martin Qiuntela
- Jan Żórawski
- Artem Manuilov
- Graduates and students of the Academy of Theatre Practices

Musicians and musical arrangers/composers

- Maciej Rychły
- Zygmunt Konieczny
- Mikołaj Blajda

== Bibliography ==
- Paul Allain. Gardzienice. Polish Theatre in transition. England, USA: Harwood Academic Publisher 1997.
- Alison Hodge. Twentieth Century Actor’s Training. London, New York: Routledge 2000.
- Staniewski, Włodzimierz with Hodge, Alison. Hidden Territories. London: Routledge 2004.
- Filipowicz, Halina. Expedition into Culture: The Gardzienice (Poland). The Drama Review, Vol. 27, No. 1, New European and U. S. Theatre (Spring, 1983).
- Filipowicz, Halina. Demythologizing Polish Theatre. Source: TDR, Vol. 39, No. 1 (Spring, 1995).
- Filipowicz, Halina. Gardzienice: A Polish Expedition to Baltimore. The Drama Review, Vol. 31, No. 1 (Spring, 1987).
- Filipowicz, Halina. Polish Theatre after Solidarity: A Challenging Test. TDR Vol. 36, No. 1 (Spring, 1992).
- Staniewski, Włodzimierz. Monograph Archive: Gardzienice, Poland. Exeter: Arts Documentation Unit, 1993.
- Centre for Theatre Practices "Gardzienice" old website
- Centre for Theatre Practices "Gardzienice"
