= Jadwiga Stańczakowa =

Polish poet (1919–1996)

- Born: 27 September 1919; Warszawa
- Died: 29 May 1996 (aged 76); Warszawa
- Occupation: Poet

Jadwiga Stańczakowa (27 September 1919 – 29 May 1996) was a poet.

== Biography ==
She wrote several books of poetry, autobiographical prose and a diary. For Stańczakowa, the dysfunction of sight has been a cause of recurring depressions. She was friend of Miron Białoszewski. Her remainings were buried at the Powązki Cemetery.

== Poetry books ==
- Boicie się czarnego ptaka?
- Depresje i wróżby
- Dziennik we dwoje
- Japońska wiśnia. Haiku dla Michi Tsukada
- Kabaret Kizi-Mizi
- Magia niewidzenia
- Na żywo
- Niewidoma
- Refugium
- Ślepak
- Wiersze dla mojej córki
- Ziemia – kosmos

== Cultural impact ==
In 2024, her biography Jadwiga by Justyna Sobolewska was released by Znak. Also in 2024 a selection of Stańczakowa's poems Poezje i prozinki was released by Marginesy.
