= Włodzimierz Staniewski =

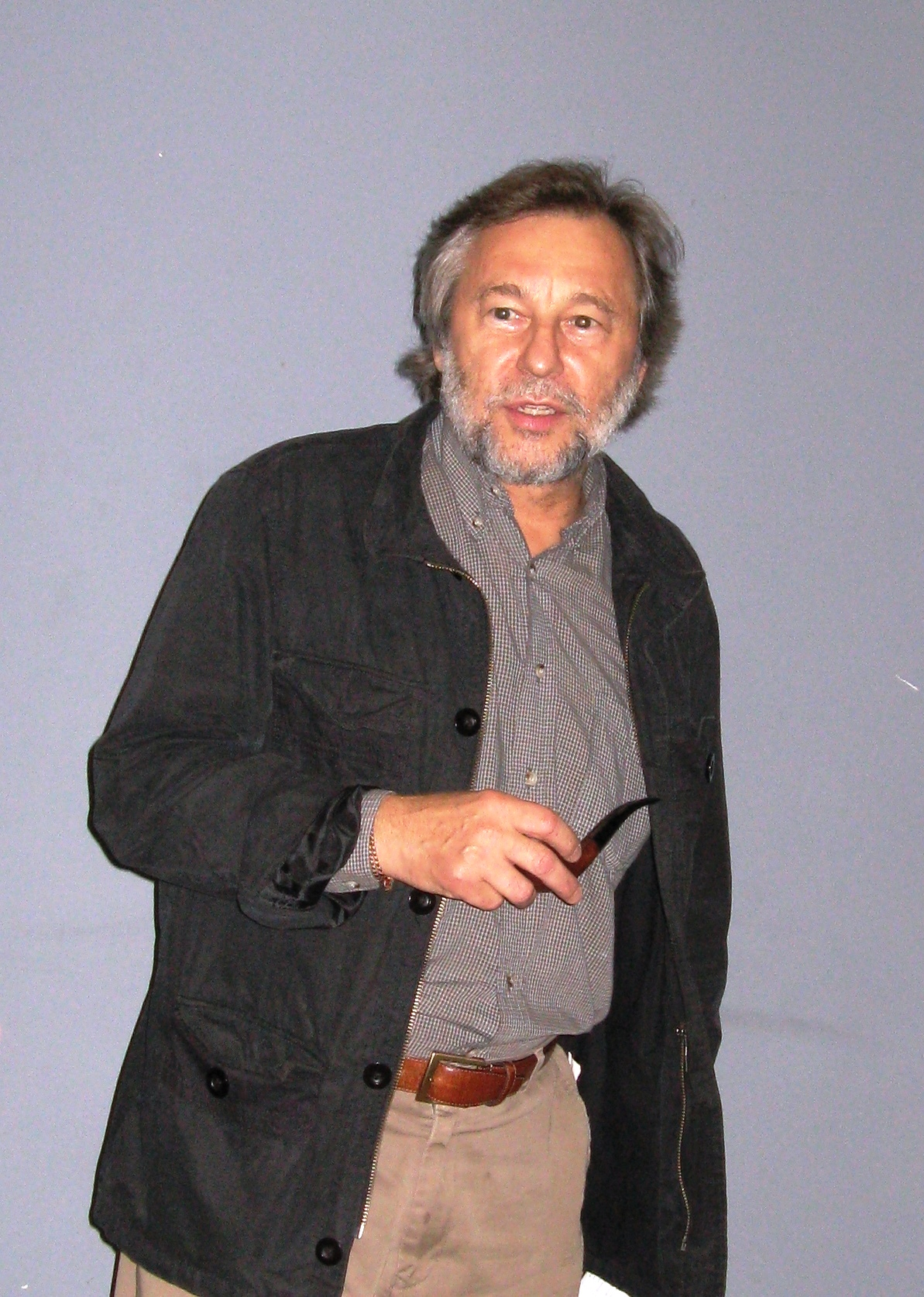
In 2010

Włodzimierz Staniewski (born in 1950 in Bardo, Poland) is a Polish theatre and film director, founder and director of the Gardzienice Centre for Theatre Practices. Author of international programmes, actor training, essays, and plays.

== Awards ==
- 1990: Diploma from the minister of foreign affairs for the Gardzienice Centre for Theatre Practices for its contribution to promoting Polish culture abroad
- 1991: Konrad Swinarski Award for Włodzimierz Staniewski and the group for the establishment and activity of the Gardzienice Centre for Theatre Practices
- 1999: First prize for the performance "Metamorfozy" / "Metamorphoses" based on Apuleius, at the MESS International Theatre Festival in Sarajevo
- 2002: Knight's Cross of the Order of Polonia Restituta
- 2005: Silver Medal for Merit to Culture – Gloria Artis
- Meritorious Activist of Culture

== Bibliography ==
- Paul Allain. Gardzienice. Polish Theatre in transition. England, USA: Harwood Academic Publisher 1997.
- Alison Hodge. Twentieth Century Actor’s Training. London, New York: Routledge 2000.
- Staniewski, Włodzimierz with Hodge, Alison. Hidden Territories. London: Routledge 2004.
- Filipowicz, Halina. Expedition into Culture: The Gardzienice (Poland). The Drama Review, Vol. 27, No. 1, New European and U. S. Theatre (Spring, 1983), pp. 54–71.
- Filipowicz, Halina. Demythologizing Polish Theatre. Source: TDR, Vol. 39, No. 1 (Spring, 1995), pp. 122–128
- Filipowicz, Halina. Gardzienice: A Polish Expedition to Baltimore. The Drama Review, Vol. 31, No. 1 (Spring, 1987), pp. 137–163.
- Filipowicz, Halina. Polish Theatre after Solidarity: A Challenging Test. TDR Vol. 36, No. 1 (Spring, 1992), pp. 70–89
- Staniewski, Włodzimierz. Monograph Archive: Gardzienice, Poland. Exeter: Arts Documentation Unit, 1993.
- Centre for Theatre Practices "Gardzienice" website
- Biography on e-teatr.pl
