= Ludwik Flaszen =

Polish writer and theatre director (1930–2020)

- Born: 14 June 1930; Kraków, Poland
- Died: 24 October 2020 (aged 90); Paris, France
- Occupations: Theatre director Writer

Ludwik Flaszen (14 June 1930 – 24 October 2020) was a Polish theatre director and writer. He collaborated with Jerzy Grotowski, with whom he cofounded the Teatr 13 Rzędów in Opole, as well as the Teatr Laboratorium. He lived in Paris from 1984 until his death.

== Biography ==
Flaszen was born into a Jewish family in Kraków. He lived in the Soviet Union during World War II. He began his career working for the magazine Życie Literackie before becoming literary director of the Juliusz Słowacki Theatre. He started the discussion on socialist realism in the theatre and was against the simplifications of Stalinist ideals. His first book, Głowa i mur, published in 1958, caused him to be arrested and the book destroyed.

In 1959, Flaszen was given the opportunity to take over direction of the Teatr 13 Rzędów, but decided to defer power to Jerzy Grotowski, despite the fact that the two men did not know each other personally. In a letter to a colleague written years later, Grotowski stated that "Ludwik was very critical of me, of my directing work, but it was precisely he who was offered the management of a theater in Opole and it was he who then entrusted it to me".

Flaszen wrote several sketches on the theatre, such as Cyrograf, Teatr skazany na magię, and Il Teatr Laboratorium di Jerzy Grotowski 1959 –1969, testi e materiali di Jerzy Grotowski e Ludwik Flaszen con un scritto di Eugenio Barba.

On 10 May 2000, Flaszen was awarded the Order of Merit of the Republic of Poland by President Aleksandr Kwaśniewski. On 12 January 2009, he was awarded the Medal for Merit to Culture – Gloria Artis by Minister of Culture Bogdan Zdrojewski.

Ludwik Flaszen died in Paris on 24 October 2020 at the age of 90.

== Publications ==
- Głowa i mur (1958)
- Cyrograf (1971)
- Teatr skazany na magię (1983)
- Teatr – sztuka antraktu; Marzyciele (2003)
