= Jurzykowski Prize =

Prize in Literature

The Alfred Jurzykowski Prize is an annual prize awarded by the Alfred Jurzykowski Foundation in New York City for the translation of Polish works into English. Its recipients have included such writers as Witold Lutosławski (1966), Leszek Kołakowski (1969), Miron Białoszewski, (1982), Ryszard Kapuściński (1993), and Bogusław Schaeffer (1998). Scientists were also among recipients of the "Alfred Jurzykowski Prize", among them the Member of the Manhattan Project and co-father of hydrogen bomb Stanislaw Ulam or immunologist, Member of the Polish Academy of Learning (PAU), Marian Zembala.
