= Polish culture during World War II =

During World War II, Polish culture was suppressed by the occupying powers of Nazi Germany and the Soviet Union, both of whom were hostile to Poland's people and cultural heritage. Policies aimed at cultural genocide resulted in the deaths of thousands of scholars and artists, and the theft and destruction of innumerable cultural artifacts. ''The maltreatment of the Poles was one of many ways in which the Nazi and Soviet regimes had grown to resemble one another", wrote British-American historian Niall Ferguson from the conservative Hoover Institution.

The occupiers looted and destroyed much of Poland's cultural and historical heritage while persecuting and murdering members of the Polish cultural elite. Most Polish schools were closed, and those that remained open saw their curricula altered significantly.

Nevertheless, underground organizations and individuals—in particular the Polish Underground State—saved much of Poland's most valuable cultural treasures, and worked to salvage as many cultural institutions and artifacts as possible. The Catholic Church and wealthy individuals contributed to the survival of some artists and their works. Despite severe retribution by the Nazis and Soviets, Polish underground cultural activities, including publications, concerts, live theater, education, and academic research, continued throughout the war.

== Background ==
In 1795 Poland ceased to exist as a sovereign nation and throughout the 19th century remained partitioned by degrees between Prussian, Austrian and Russian empires. Not until the end of World War I was independence restored and the nation reunited, although the drawing of boundary lines was, of necessity, a contentious issue. Independent Poland lasted for only 21 years before it was again attacked and divided among foreign powers.

On 1 September 1939, Germany invaded Poland, initiating World War II in Europe, and on 17 September, pursuant to the Molotov–Ribbentrop Pact, Poland was invaded by the Soviet Union. Subsequently, Poland was partitioned again—between these two powers—and remained under occupation for most of the war. By 1 October, Germany and the Soviet Union had completely overrun Poland, although the Polish government never formally surrendered, and the Polish Underground State, subordinate to the Polish government-in-exile, was soon formed. On 8 October, Nazi Germany annexed the western areas of pre-war Poland and, in the remainder of the occupied area, established the General Government. The Soviet Union had to temporarily give up the territorial gains it made in 1939 due to the German invasion of the Soviet Union, but permanently re-annexed much of this territory after winning it back in mid-1944. Over the course of the war, Poland lost over 20% of its pre-war population amid an occupation that marked the end of the Second Polish Republic.

== Destruction of Polish culture ==
=== German occupation ===
==== Policy ====
Germany's policy toward the Polish nation and its culture evolved during the course of the war. Many German officials and military officers were initially not given any clear guidelines on the treatment of Polish cultural institutions, but this quickly changed. Immediately following the invasion of Poland in September 1939, the Nazi German government implemented the first stages (the "small plan") of Generalplan Ost. The basic policy was outlined by the Berlin Office of Racial Policy in a document titled Concerning the Treatment of the Inhabitants of the Former Polish Territories, from a Racial-Political Standpoint. Slavic people living east of the pre-war German border were to be Germanized, enslaved or eradicated, depending on whether they lived in the territories directly annexed into the German state or in the General Government.

Much of the German policy on Polish culture was formulated during a meeting between the governor of the General Government, Hans Frank, and Nazi Minister of Propaganda Joseph Goebbels, at Łódź on 31 October 1939. Goebbels declared that "The Polish nation is not worthy to be called a cultured nation". He and Frank agreed that opportunities for the Poles to experience their culture should be severely restricted: no theaters, cinemas or cabarets; no access to radio or press; and no education. Frank suggested that the Poles should periodically be shown films highlighting the achievements of the Third Reich and should eventually be addressed only by megaphone. During the following weeks Polish schools beyond middle vocational levels were closed, as were theaters and many other cultural institutions. The only Polish-language newspaper published in occupied Poland was also closed, and the arrests of Polish intellectuals began.

In March 1940, all cultural activities came under the control of the General Government's Department of People's Education and Propaganda (Abteilung für Volksaufklärung und Propaganda), whose name was changed a year later to the "Chief Propaganda Department" (Hauptabteilung Propaganda). Further directives issued in the spring and early summer reflected policies that had been outlined by Frank and Goebbels during the previous autumn. One of the Department's earliest decrees prohibited the organization of all but the most "primitive" of cultural activities without the Department's prior approval. Spectacles of "low quality", including those of an erotic or pornographic nature, were however an exception—those were to be popularized to appease the population and to show the world the "real" Polish culture as well as to create the impression that Germany was not preventing Poles from expressing themselves. German propaganda specialists invited critics from neutral countries to specially organized "Polish" performances that were specifically designed to be boring or pornographic, and presented them as typical Polish cultural activities. Polish-German cooperation in cultural matters, such as joint public performances, was strictly prohibited. Meanwhile, a compulsory registration scheme for writers and artists was introduced in August 1940. Then, in October, the printing of new Polish-language books was prohibited; existing titles were censored, and often confiscated and withdrawn.

In 1941, German policy evolved further, calling for the complete destruction of the Polish people, whom the Nazis regarded as "subhumans" (Untermenschen). Within ten to twenty years, the Polish territories under German occupation were to be entirely cleared of ethnic Poles and settled by German colonists. The policy was relaxed somewhat in the final years of occupation (1943–44), in view of German military defeats and the approaching Eastern Front. The Germans hoped that a more lenient cultural policy would lessen unrest and weaken the Polish Resistance. Poles were allowed back into those museums that now supported German propaganda and indoctrination, such as the newly created Chopin museum, which emphasized the composer's invented German roots. Restrictions on education, theater and music performances were eased.

Given that the Second Polish Republic was a multicultural state, German policies and propaganda also sought to create and encourage conflicts between ethnic groups, fueling tension between Poles and Jews, and between Poles and Ukrainians. In Łódź, the Germans forced Jews to help destroy a monument to a Polish hero, Tadeusz Kościuszko, and filmed them committing the act. Soon afterward, the Germans set fire to a Jewish synagogue and filmed Polish bystanders, portraying them in propaganda releases as a "vengeful mob." This divisive policy was reflected in the Germans' decision to destroy Polish education, while at the same time, showing relative tolerance toward the Ukrainian school system. As the high-ranking Nazi official Erich Koch explained, "We must do everything possible so that when a Pole meets a Ukrainian, he will be willing to kill the Ukrainian and conversely, the Ukrainian will be willing to kill the Pole."

==== Plunder ====
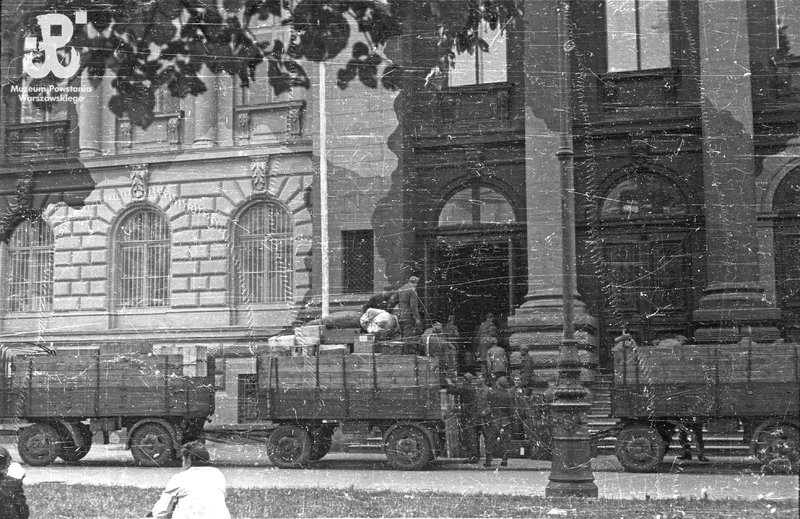
Germans looting the Zachęta Museum in Warsaw, summer 1944

In 1939, as the occupation regime was being established, the Nazis confiscated Polish state property and much private property. Countless art objects were looted and taken to Germany, in line with a plan that had been drawn up well in advance of the invasion. The looting was supervised by experts of the SS-Ahnenerbe, Einsatzgruppen units, who were responsible for art, and by experts of Haupttreuhandstelle Ost, who were responsible for more mundane objects. Notable items plundered by the Nazis included the Altar of Veit Stoss and paintings by Raphael, Rembrandt, Leonardo da Vinci, Canaletto and Bacciarelli. Most of the important art pieces had been "secured" by the Nazis within six months of September 1939; by the end of 1942, German officials estimated that "over 90%" of the art previously in Poland was in their possession. Some art was shipped to German museums, such as the planned Führermuseum in Linz, while other art became the private property of Nazi officials. Over 516,000 individual art pieces were taken, including 2,800 paintings by European painters; 11,000 works by Polish painters; 1,400 sculptures, 75,000 manuscripts, 25,000 maps, and 90,000 books (including over 20,000 printed before 1800); as well as hundreds of thousands of other objects of artistic and historic value. Even exotic animals were taken from the zoos.

==== Destruction ====
Many places of learning and culture—universities, schools, libraries, museums, theaters and cinemas—were either closed or designated as "Nur für Deutsche" (For Germans Only). Twenty-five museums and a host of other institutions were destroyed during the war. According to one estimate, by war's end 43% of the infrastructure of Poland's educational and research institutions and 14% of its museums had been destroyed. According to another, only 105 of pre-war Poland's 175 museums survived the war, and just 33 of these institutions were able to reopen. Of pre-war Poland's 603 scientific institutions, about half were totally destroyed, and only a few survived the war relatively intact.

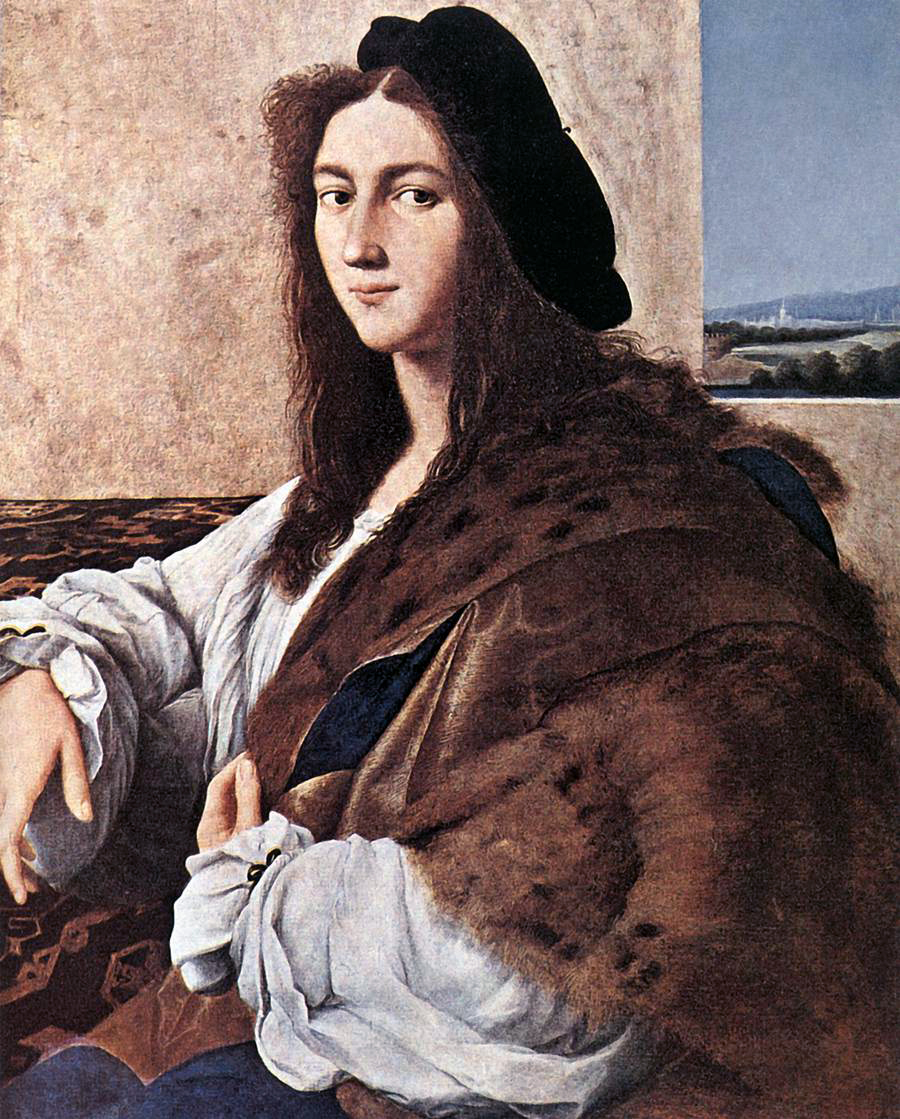
Portrait of a Young Man, by Raphael, ca. 1514. Possibly a self-portrait, and if so, the most valuable single piece of art looted by the Nazis in Poland. Formerly in the collection of the Czartoryski Museum in Kraków, its whereabouts remain unknown.

Many university professors, as well as teachers, lawyers, artists, writers, priests and other members of the Polish intelligentsia were arrested and executed, or transported to concentration camps, during operations such as AB-Aktion. This particular campaign resulted in the infamous Sonderaktion Krakau and the massacre of Lwów professors. During World War II Poland lost 39% to 45% of its physicians and dentists, 26% to 57% of its lawyers, 15% to 30% of its teachers, 30% to 40% of its scientists and university professors, and 18% to 28% of its clergy. The Jewish intelligentsia was exterminated altogether. The reasoning behind this policy was clearly articulated by a Nazi gauleiter: "In my district, [any Pole who] shows signs of intelligence will be shot."

As part of their program to suppress Polish culture, the German Nazis attempted to destroy Christianity in Poland, with a particular emphasis on the Roman Catholic Church. In some parts of occupied Poland, Poles were restricted, or even forbidden, from attending religious services. At the same time, church property was confiscated, prohibitions were placed on using the Polish language in religious services, organizations affiliated with the Catholic Church were abolished, and it was forbidden to perform certain religious songs—or to read passages of the Bible—in public. The worst conditions were found in the Reichsgau Wartheland, which the Nazis treated as a laboratory for their anti-religious policies. Polish clergy and religious leaders figured prominently among portions of the intelligentsia that were targeted for extermination.

To forestall the rise of a new generation of educated Poles, German officials decreed that the schooling of Polish children would be limited to a few years of elementary education. Reichsführer-SS Heinrich Himmler wrote, in a memorandum of May 1940: "The sole purpose of this schooling is to teach them simple arithmetic, nothing above the number 500; how to write one's name; and the doctrine that it is divine law to obey the Germans .... I do not regard a knowledge of reading as desirable." Hans Frank echoed him: "The Poles do not need universities or secondary schools; the Polish lands are to be converted into an intellectual desert." The situation was particularly dire in the former Polish territories beyond the General Government, which had been annexed to the Third Reich. The specific policy varied from territory to territory, but in general, there was no Polish-language education at all. German policy constituted a crash-Germanization of the populace. Polish teachers were dismissed, and some were invited to attend "orientation" meetings with the new administration, where they were either summarily arrested or executed on the spot. Some Polish schoolchildren were sent to German schools, while others were sent to special schools where they spent most of their time as unpaid laborers, usually on German-run farms; speaking Polish brought severe punishment. It was expected that Polish children would begin to work once they finished their primary education at age 12 to 15. In the eastern territories not included in the General Government (Bezirk Bialystok, Reichskommissariat Ostland and Reichskommissariat Ukraine) many primary schools were closed, and most education was conducted in non-Polish languages such as Ukrainian, Belarusian, and Lithuanian. In the Bezirk Bialystok region, for example, 86% of the schools that had existed before the war were closed down during the first two years of German occupation, and by the end of the following year that figure had increased to 93%.

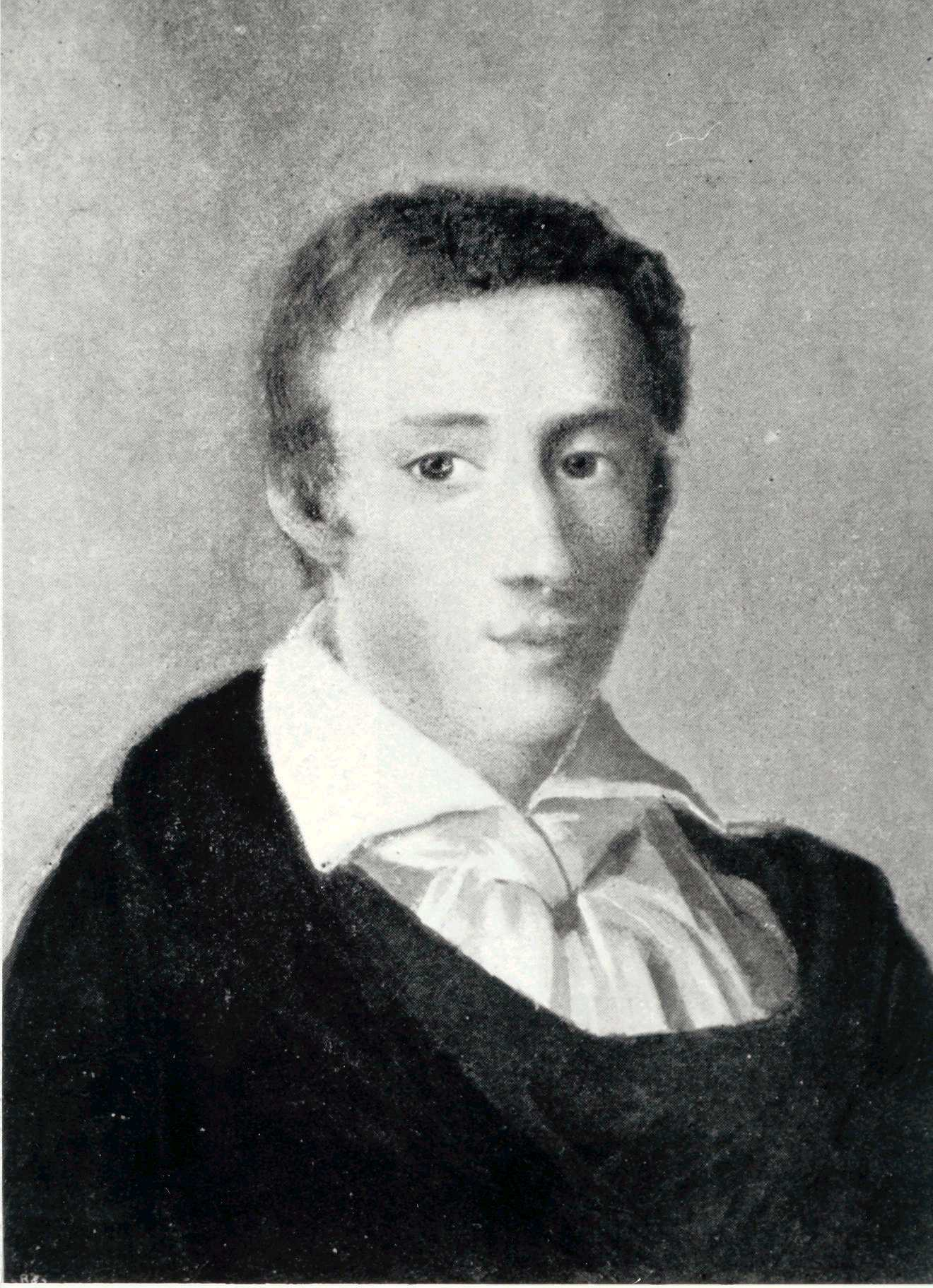
Photo of earliest, 1829 portrait of Chopin, by Mieroszewski. Destroyed in Warsaw, September 1939.

The state of Polish primary schools was somewhat better in the General Government, though by the end of 1940, only 30% of prewar schools were operational, and only 28% of prewar Polish children attended them. A German police memorandum of August 1943 described the situation as follows:

Pupils sit crammed together without necessary materials, and often without skilled teaching staff. Moreover, the Polish schools are closed during at least five months out of the ten months of the school year due to lack of coal or other fuel. Of twenty-thirty spacious school buildings which Kraków had before 1939, today the worst two buildings are used ... Every day, pupils have to study in several shifts. Under such circumstances, the school day, which normally lasts five hours, is reduced to one hour.

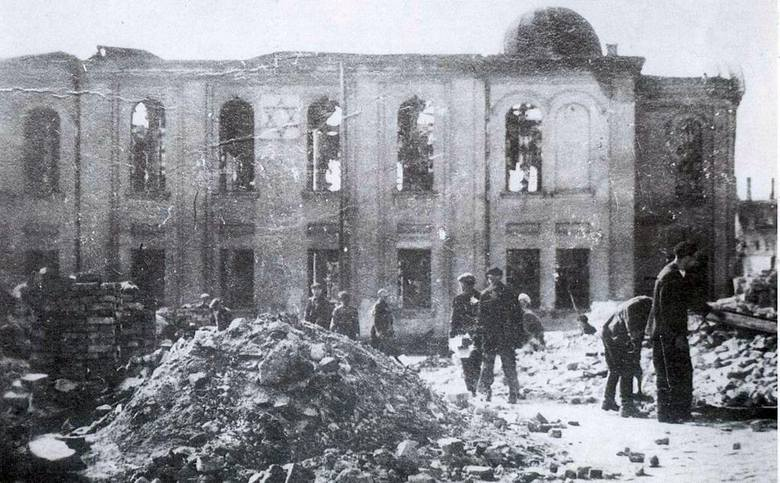
Burned ruins of the Great Synagogue of Białystok, after it was torched down by the Germans with approximately 2000 Jews inside, 1941.

In the General Government, the remaining schools were subjugated to the German educational system, and the number and competence of their Polish staff was steadily scaled down. All universities and most secondary schools were closed, if not immediately after the invasion, then by mid-1940. By late 1940, no official Polish educational institutions more advanced than a vocational school remained in operation, and they offered nothing beyond the elementary trade and technical training required for the Nazi economy. Primary schooling was to last for seven years, but the classes in the final two years of the program were to be limited to meeting one day per week. There was no money for heating the schools in winter. Classes and schools were to be merged, Polish teachers dismissed, and the resulting savings used to sponsor the creation of schools for children of the German minority or to create barracks for German troops. No new Polish teachers were to be trained. The educational curriculum was censored; subjects such as literature, history and geography were removed. Old textbooks were confiscated and school libraries were closed. The new educational aims for Poles included convincing them that their national fate was hopeless and teaching them to be submissive and respectful to Germans. This was accomplished through deliberate tactics such as police raids on schools, police inspections of student belongings, mass arrests of students and teachers, and the use of students as forced laborers, often by transporting them to Germany as seasonal workers.

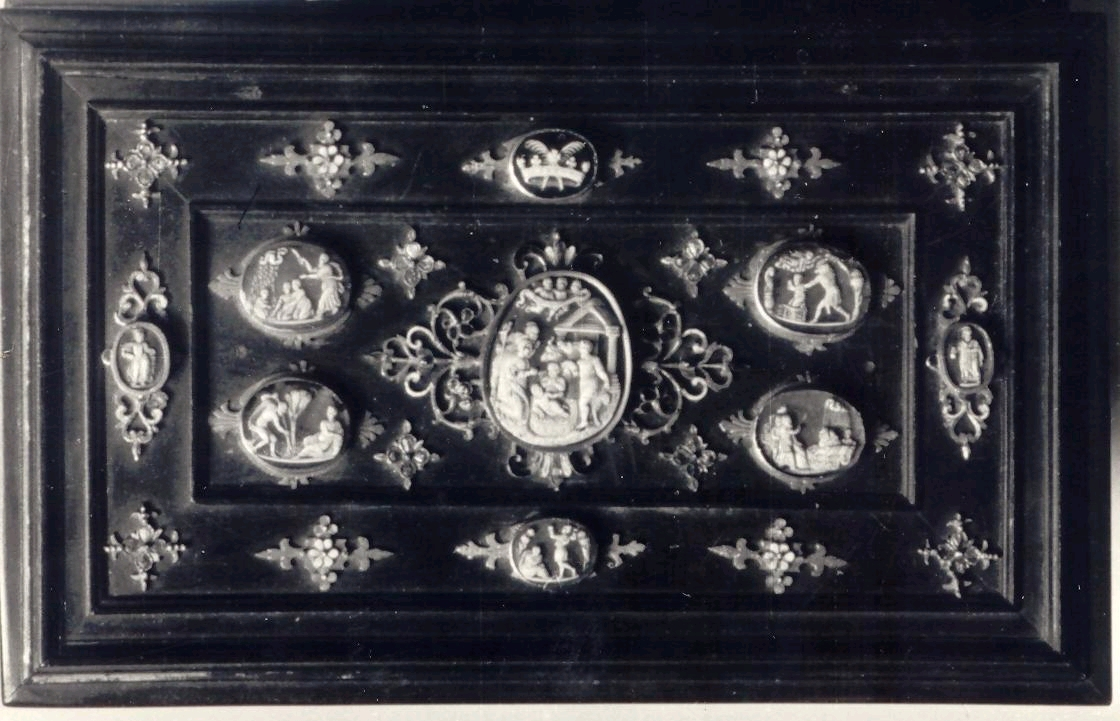
Queen Bona's 16th century royal casket, looted and destroyed by the Germans in 1939

The Germans were especially active in the destruction of Jewish culture in Poland; nearly all of the wooden synagogues there were destroyed. Moreover, the sale of Jewish literature was banned throughout Poland.

Polish literature faced a similar fate in territories annexed by Germany, where the sale of Polish books was forbidden. The public destruction of Polish books was not limited to those seized from libraries, but also included those books that were confiscated from private homes. The last Polish book titles not already proscribed were withdrawn in 1943; even Polish prayer books were confiscated. Soon after the occupation began, most libraries were closed; in Kraków, about 80% of the libraries were closed immediately, while the remainder saw their collections decimated by censors. The occupying powers destroyed Polish book collections, including the Sejm and Senate Library, the Przedziecki Estate Library, the Zamoyski Estate Library, the Central Military Library, and the Rapperswil Collection. In 1941, the last remaining Polish public library in the German-occupied territories was closed in Warsaw. During the war, Warsaw libraries lost about a million volumes, or 30% of their collections. More than 80% of these losses were the direct result of purges rather than wartime conflict. Overall, it is estimated that about 10 million volumes from state-owned libraries and institutions perished during the war.

Polish flags and other symbols were confiscated. The war on the Polish language included the tearing down of signs in Polish and the banning of Polish speech in public places. Persons who spoke Polish in the streets were often insulted and even physically assaulted. The Germanization of place names prevailed. Many treasures of Polish culture – including memorials, plaques and monuments to national heroes (e.g., Kraków's Adam Mickiewicz monument) – were destroyed. In Toruń, all Polish monuments and plaques were torn down. Dozens of monuments were destroyed throughout Poland. The Nazis planned to level entire cities.

==== Censorship and propaganda ====
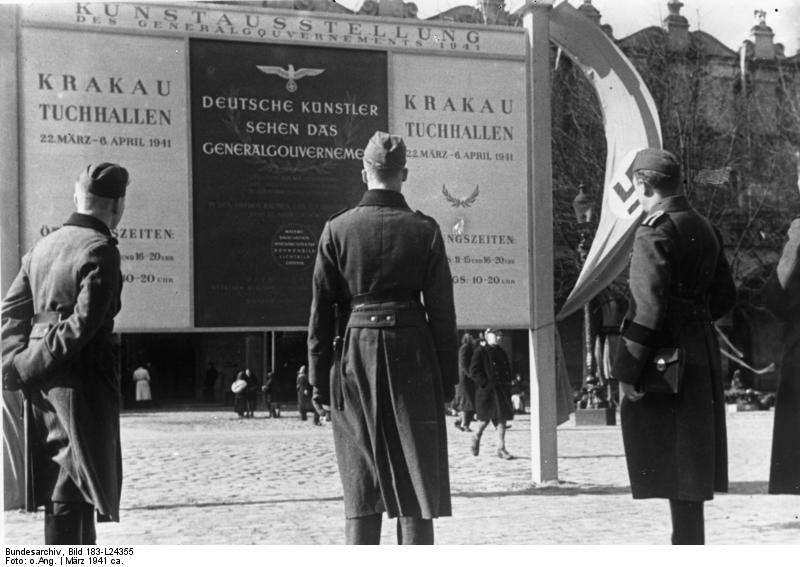
Kraków, 1941. Announcement of an art exhibition in the Sukiennice Cloth Hall: "How German artists see the General Government"

The Germans prohibited publication of any regular Polish-language book, literary study or scholarly paper. In 1940, several German-controlled printing houses began operating in occupied Poland, publishing items such as Polish-German dictionaries and antisemitic and anticommunist novels.

Censorship at first targeted books that were considered to be "serious", including scientific and educational texts and texts that were thought to promote Polish patriotism; only fiction that was free of anti-German overtones was permitted. Banned literature included maps, atlases and English- and French-language publications, including dictionaries. Several non-public indexes of prohibited books were created, and over 1,500 Polish writers were declared "dangerous to the German state and culture". The index of banned authors included such Polish authors as Adam Mickiewicz, Juliusz Słowacki, Stanisław Wyspiański, Bolesław Prus, Stefan Żeromski, Józef Ignacy Kraszewski, Władysław Reymont, Stanisław Wyspiański, Julian Tuwim, Kornel Makuszyński, Leopold Staff, Eliza Orzeszkowa and Maria Konopnicka. Mere possession of such books was illegal and punishable by imprisonment. Door-to-door sale of books was banned, and bookstores—which required a license to operate—were either emptied out or closed.

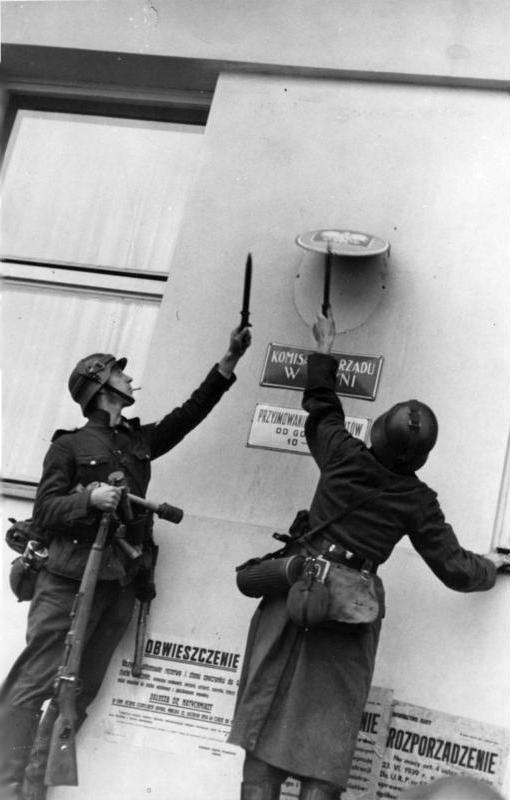
Wehrmacht soldiers destroying Polish government insignia in Gdynia, September 1939

Poles were forbidden, under penalty of death, to own radios. The press was reduced from over 2,000 publications to a few dozen, all censored by the Germans. All pre-war newspapers were closed, and the few that were published during the occupation were new creations under the total control of the Germans. Such a thorough destruction of the press was unprecedented in contemporary history. The only officially available reading matter was the propaganda press that was disseminated by the German occupation administration. Cinemas, now under the control of the German propaganda machine, saw their programming dominated by Nazi German movies, which were preceded by propaganda newsreels. The few Polish films permitted to be shown (about 20% of the total programming) were edited to eliminate references to Polish national symbols as well as Jewish actors and producers. Several propaganda films were shot in Polish, although no Polish films were shown after 1943. As all profits from Polish cinemas were officially directed toward German war production, attendance was discouraged by the Polish underground; a famous underground slogan declared: "Tylko świnie siedzą w kinie" ("Only pigs attend the movies"). A similar situation faced theaters, which were forbidden by the Germans to produce "serious" spectacles. Indeed, a number of propaganda pieces were created for theater stages. Hence, theatrical productions were also boycotted by the underground. In addition, actors were discouraged from performing in them and warned that they would be labeled as collaborators if they failed to comply. Ironically, restrictions on cultural performances were eased in Jewish ghettos, given that the Germans wished to distract ghetto inhabitants and prevent them from grasping their eventual fate.

Music was the least restricted of cultural activities, probably because Hans Frank regarded himself as a fan of serious music. In time, he ordered the creation of the Orchestra and Symphony of the General Government in its capital, Kraków. Numerous musical performances were permitted in cafes and churches, and the Polish underground chose to boycott only the propagandist operas. Visual artists, including painters and sculptors, were compelled to register with the German government; but their work was generally tolerated by the underground unless it conveyed propagandist themes. Shuttered museums were replaced by occasional art exhibitions that frequently conveyed propagandist themes.

The development of Nazi propaganda in occupied Poland can be divided into two main phases. Initial efforts were directed towards creating a negative image of pre-war Poland, and later efforts were aimed at fostering anti-Soviet, antisemitic, and pro-German attitudes.

=== Soviet occupation ===
After the Soviet invasion of Poland (beginning 17 September 1939) that followed the German invasion that had marked the start of World War II (beginning 1 September 1939), the Soviet Union annexed the eastern parts ("Kresy") of the Second Polish Republic, comprising 201,015 square kilometres (77,612 sq mi) and a population of 13.299 million. Hitler and Stalin shared the goal of obliterating Poland's political and cultural life, so that Poland would, according to self-described neo-imperialist historian Niall Ferguson, "cease to exist not merely as a place, but also as an idea".

Fourth Partition of Poland, 1939–41, pursuant to the Nazi–Soviet Molotov–Ribbentrop Pact

The Soviet authorities regarded service to the prewar Polish state as a "crime against revolution" and "counter-revolutionary activity" and arrested many right-wing members of the Polish intelligentsia, politicians, civil servants and academics, as well as ordinary persons suspected of posing a threat to Soviet rule. More than a million Polish citizens were deported to Siberia, many to Gulag concentration camps, for years or decades. Others died, including over 20,000 military officers who perished in the Katyn massacres.

The Soviets quickly Sovietized the annexed lands, introducing compulsory collectivization. They proceeded to confiscate, nationalize and redistribute private and state-owned Polish property. In the process, they banned political parties and public associations and imprisoned or executed their leaders as "enemies of the people". In line with Soviet anti-religious policy, churches and religious organizations were persecuted. On 10 February 1940, the NKVD unleashed a campaign of terror against "anti-Soviet" elements in occupied Poland. The Soviets' targets included persons who often traveled abroad, persons involved in overseas correspondence, Esperantists, philatelists, Red Cross workers, refugees, smugglers, priests and members of religious congregations, the nobility, landowners, wealthy merchants, bankers, industrialists, and hotel and restaurant owners.

The Soviet authorities sought to remove all traces of the Polish history of the area now under their control. The name "Poland" was banned. Polish monuments were torn down. All institutions of the dismantled Polish state, including the Lwów University, were closed, then reopened, mostly with new Soviet directors. Soviet Communist ideology became paramount in all teaching. Polish literature and language studies were dissolved by the Soviet authorities, and the Polish language was replaced with Russian or Ukrainian. Polish-language books were burned even in primary schools. Polish teachers were not allowed in the schools, and many were arrested. Classes were held in Belarusian, Lithuanian and Ukrainian, with a new pro-Soviet curriculum. As Polish-Canadian historian Piotr Wróbel noted, citing British historians M. R. D. Foot and I. C. B. Dear, majority of scholars believe that "In the Soviet occupation zone, conditions were only marginally less harsh than under the Germans." In September 1939, many Polish Jews had fled east; after some months of living under Soviet rule, some of them wanted to return to the German zone of occupied Poland.

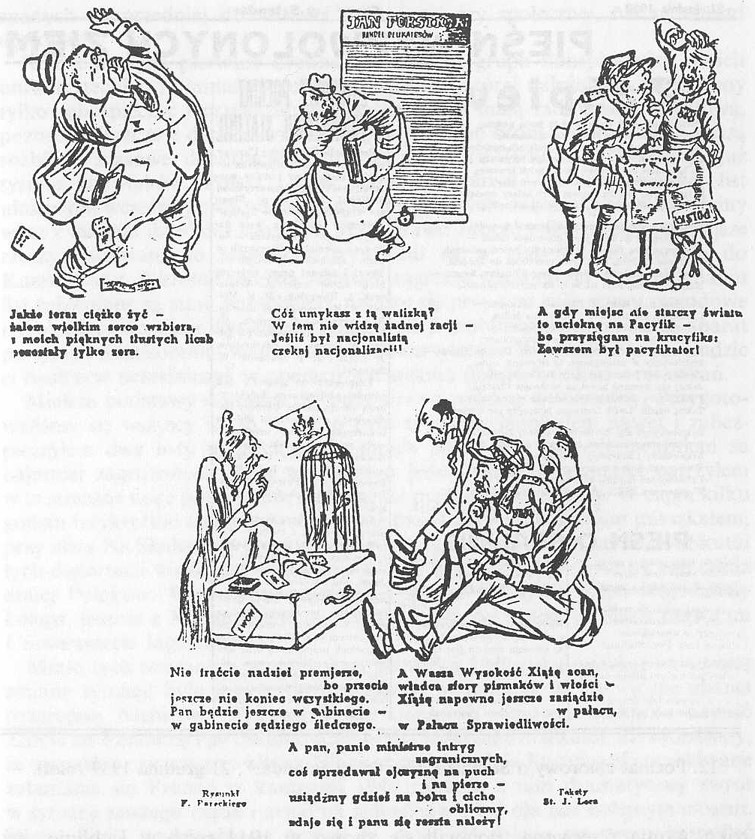
Soviet-inspired caricatures published in Polish in Lwów, September 1940, excoriating Polish "enemies of the state"—businessmen, army officers, aristocrats

All publications and media were subjected to censorship. The Soviets sought to recruit Polish left-wing intellectuals who were willing to cooperate. Soon after the Soviet invasion, the Writers' Association of Soviet Ukraine created a local chapter in Lwów; there was a Polish-language theater and radio station. Polish cultural activities in Minsk and Vilnius were less organized. These activities were strictly controlled by the Soviet authorities, which saw to it that these activities portrayed the new Soviet regime in a positive light and vilified the former Polish government.

The Soviet propaganda-motivated support for Polish-language cultural activities, however, clashed with the official policy of Russification. The Soviets at first intended to phase out the Polish language and so banned Polish from schools, street signs, and other aspects of life. This policy was, however, reversed at times—first before the elections in October 1939; and later, after the German conquest of France. In November 1940, the Poles of Lwów observed the 85th anniversary of Adam Mickiewicz's death. Soon, however, Stalin decided to re-implement the Russification policies. He reversed his decision again, however, when a need arose for Polish-language pro-Soviet propaganda following the German invasion of the Soviet Union; as a result, Stalin permitted the creation of Polish forces in the East and later decided to create a Communist People's Republic of Poland.

Many Polish writers collaborated with the Soviets, writing pro-Soviet propaganda. They included Jerzy Borejsza, Tadeusz Boy-Żeleński, Kazimierz Brandys, Janina Broniewska, Jan Brzoza, Teodor Bujnicki, Leon Chwistek, Zuzanna Ginczanka, Halina Górska, Mieczysław Jastrun, Stefan Jędrychowski, Stanisław Jerzy Lec, Tadeusz Łopalewski, Juliusz Kleiner, Jan Kott, Jalu Kurek, Karol Kuryluk, Leopold Lewin, Anatol Mikułko, Jerzy Pański, Leon Pasternak, Julian Przyboś, Jerzy Putrament, Jerzy Rawicz, Adolf Rudnicki, Włodzimierz Słobodnik, Włodzimierz Sokorski, Elżbieta Szemplińska, Anatol Stern, Julian Stryjkowski, Lucjan Szenwald, Leopold Tyrmand, Wanda Wasilewska, Stanisław Wasilewski, Adam Ważyk, Aleksander Weintraub and Bruno Winawer.

Other Polish writers, however, rejected the Soviet persuasions and instead published underground: Jadwiga Czechowiczówna, Jerzy Hordyński, Jadwiga Gamska-Łempicka, Herminia Naglerowa, Beata Obertyńska, Ostap Ortwin, Tadeusz Peiper, Teodor Parnicki, Juliusz Petry. Some writers, such as Władysław Broniewski, after collaborating with the Soviets for a few months, joined the anti-Soviet opposition. Similarly, Aleksander Wat, initially sympathetic to communism, was arrested by the Soviet NKVD secret police and exiled to Kazakhstan.

== Underground culture ==
=== Patrons ===
Polish culture persisted in underground education, publications, even theater. The Polish Underground State created a Department of Education and Culture (under Stanisław Lorentz) which, along with a Department of Labor and Social Welfare (under Jan Stanisław Jankowski and, later, Stefan Mateja) and a Department for Elimination of the Effects of War (under Antoni Olszewski and Bronisław Domosławski), became underground patrons of Polish culture. These Departments oversaw efforts to save from looting and destruction works of art in state and private collections (most notably, the giant paintings by Jan Matejko that were concealed throughout the war). They compiled reports on looted and destroyed works and provided artists and scholars with means to continue their work and their publications and to support their families. Thus, they sponsored the underground publication (bibuła) of works by Winston Churchill and Arkady Fiedler and of 10,000 copies of a Polish primary-school primer and commissioned artists to create resistance artwork (which was then disseminated by Operation N and like activities). Also occasionally sponsored were secret art exhibitions, theater performances and concerts.

Other important patrons of Polish culture included the Roman Catholic Church and Polish aristocrats, who likewise supported artists and safeguarded Polish heritage (notable patrons included Cardinal Adam Stefan Sapieha and a former politician, Janusz Radziwiłł). Some private publishers, including Stefan Kamieński, Zbigniew Mitzner and the Ossolineum publishing house, paid writers for books that would be delivered after the war.

=== Education ===
In response to the German closure and censorship of Polish schools, resistance among teachers led almost immediately to the creation of large-scale underground educational activities. Most notably, the Secret Teaching Organization (Tajna Organizacja Nauczycielska, TON) was created as early as October 1939. Other organizations were created locally; after 1940 they were increasingly subordinated and coordinated by the TON, working closely with the Underground's State Department of Culture and Education, which was created in autumn 1941 and headed by Czesław Wycech, creator of the TON. Classes were either held under the cover of officially permitted activities or in private homes and other venues. By 1942, about 1,500,000 students took part in underground primary education; in 1944, its secondary school system covered 100,000 people, and university level courses were attended by about 10,000 students (for comparison, the pre-war enrollment at Polish universities was about 30,000 for the 1938/1939 year). More than 90,000 secondary-school pupils attended underground classes held by nearly 6,000 teachers between 1943 and 1944 in four districts of the General Government (centered on the cities of Warsaw, Kraków, Radom and Lublin). Overall, in that period in the General Government, one of every three children was receiving some sort of education from the underground organizations; the number rose to about 70% for children old enough to attend secondary school. It is estimated that in some rural areas, the educational coverage was actually improved (most likely as courses were being organized in some cases by teachers escaped or deported from the cities). Compared to pre-war classes, the absence of Polish Jewish students was notable, as they were confined by the Nazi Germans to ghettos; there was, however, underground Jewish education in the ghettos, often organized with support from Polish organizations like TON. Students at the underground schools were often also members of the Polish resistance.

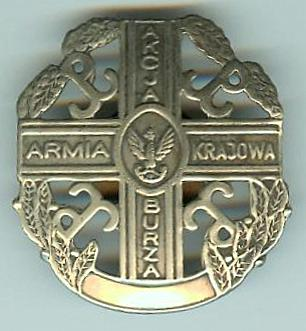
Polish Home Army medal for service in Operation Tempest

In Warsaw, there were over 70 underground schools, with 2,000 teachers and 21,000 students. Underground Warsaw University educated 3,700 students, issuing 64 masters and 7 doctoral degrees. Warsaw Politechnic under occupation educated 3,000 students, issuing 186 engineering degrees, 18 doctoral ones and 16 habilitations. Jagiellonian University issued 468 masters and 62 doctoral degrees, employed over 100 professors and teachers, and served more than 1,000 students per year. Throughout Poland, many other universities and institutions of higher education (of music, theater, arts, and others) continued their classes throughout the war. Even some academic research was carried out (for example, by Władysław Tatarkiewicz, a leading Polish philosopher, and Zenon Klemensiewicz, a linguist). Nearly 1,000 Polish scientists received funds from the Underground State, enabling them to continue their research.

The German attitude to underground education varied depending on whether it took place in the General Government or the annexed territories. The Germans had almost certainly realized the full scale of the Polish underground education system by about 1943 but lacked the manpower to put an end to it, probably prioritizing resources to dealing with the armed resistance. For the most part, closing underground schools and colleges in the General Government was not a top priority for the Germans. In 1943 a German report on education admitted that control of what was being taught in schools, particularly rural ones, was difficult, due to lack of manpower, transportation, and the activities of the Polish resistance. Some schools semi-openly taught unauthorized subjects in defiance of the German authorities. Hans Frank noted in 1944 that although Polish teachers were a "mortal enemy" of the German states, they could not all be disposed of immediately. It was perceived as a much more serious issue in the annexed territories, as it hindered the process of Germanization; involvement in the underground education in those territories was much more likely to result in a sentence to a concentration camp.

=== Print ===
Der Klabautermann, 3 January 1943—an Operation N periodical for Germans. Left: Death. Center: Hitler. Right: Himmler.

There were over 1,000 underground newspapers; among the most important were the Biuletyn Informacyjny of Armia Krajowa and Rzeczpospolita of the Government Delegation for Poland. In addition to publication of news (from intercepted Western radio transmissions), there were hundreds of underground publications dedicated to politics, economics, education, and literature (for example, Sztuka i Naród). The highest recorded publication volume was an issue of Biuletyn Informacyjny printed in 43,000 copies; average volume of larger publication was 1,000–5,000 copies. The Polish underground also published booklets and leaflets from imaginary anti-Nazi German organizations aimed at spreading disinformation and lowering morale among the Germans. Books were also sometimes printed. Other items were also printed, such as patriotic posters or fake German administration posters, ordering the Germans to evacuate Poland or telling Poles to register household cats.

The two largest underground publishers were the Bureau of Information and Propaganda of Armia Krajowa and the Government Delegation for Poland. Tajne Wojskowe Zakłady Wydawnicze (Secret Military Publishing House) of Jerzy Rutkowski (subordinated to the Armia Krajowa) was probably the largest underground publisher in the world. In addition to Polish titles, Armia Krajowa also printed false German newspapers designed to decrease morale of the occupying German forces (as part of Action N). The majority of Polish underground presses were located in occupied Warsaw; until the Warsaw Uprising in the summer of 1944 the Germans found over 16 underground printing presses (whose crews were usually executed or sent to concentration camps). The second largest center for Polish underground publishing was Kraków. There, writers and editors faced similar dangers: for example, almost the entire editorial staff of the underground satirical paper Na Ucho was arrested, and its chief editors were executed in Kraków on 27 May 1944. (Na Ucho was the longest published Polish underground paper devoted to satire; 20 issues were published starting in October 1943.) The underground press was supported by a large number of activists; in addition to the crews manning the printing presses, scores of underground couriers distributed the publications. According to some statistics, these couriers were among the underground members most frequently arrested by the Germans.

Under German occupation, the professions of Polish journalists and writers were virtually eliminated, as they had little opportunity to publish their work. The Underground State's Department of Culture sponsored various initiatives and individuals, enabling them to continue their work and aiding in their publication. Novels and anthologies were published by underground presses; over 1,000 works were published underground over the course of the war. Literary discussions were held, and prominent writers of the period working in Poland included, among others, Krzysztof Kamil Baczyński, Leslaw Bartelski, Tadeusz Borowski, Tadeusz Boy-Żeleński, Maria Dąbrowska, Tadeusz Gajcy, Zuzanna Ginczanka, Jarosław Iwaszkiewicz, future Nobel Prize winner Czesław Miłosz, Zofia Nałkowska, Jan Parandowski, Leopold Staff, Kazimierz Wyka, and Jerzy Zawieyski. Writers wrote about the difficult conditions in the prisoner-of-war camps (Konstanty Ildefons Gałczyński, Stefan Flukowski, Leon Kruczkowski, Andrzej Nowicki and Marian Piechała), the ghettos, and even from inside the concentration camps (Jan Maria Gisges, Halina Gołczowa, Zofia Górska (Romanowiczowa), Tadeusz Hołuj, Kazimierz Andrzej Jaworski and Marian Kubicki). Many writers did not survive the war, among them Krzysztof Kamil Baczyński, Wacław Berent, Tadeusz Boy-Żeleński, Tadeusz Gajcy, Zuzanna Ginczanka, Juliusz Kaden-Bandrowski, Stefan Kiedrzyński, Janusz Korczak, Halina Krahelska, Tadeusz Hollender, Witold Hulewicz, Ferdynand Antoni Ossendowski, Włodzimierz Pietrzak, Leon Pomirowski, Kazimierz Przerwa-Tetmajer and Bruno Schulz.

=== Visual arts and music ===
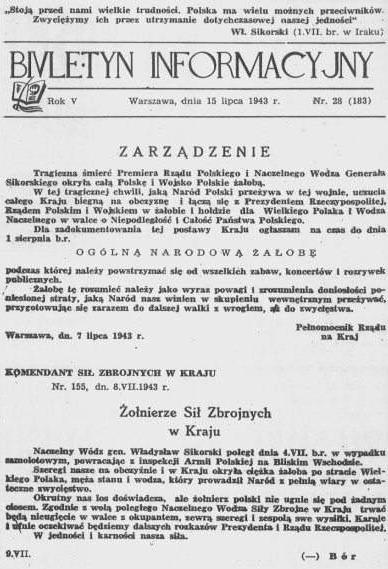
Polish Underground State Information Bulletin, 15 July 1943, reports the death of Gen. Sikorski and orders a national day of mourning

With the censorship of Polish theater (and the virtual end of the Polish radio and film industry), underground theaters were created, primarily in Warsaw and Kraków, with shows presented in various underground venues. Beginning in 1940 the theaters were coordinated by the Secret Theatrical Council. Four large companies and more than 40 smaller groups were active throughout the war, even in the Gestapo's Pawiak prison in Warsaw and in Auschwitz; underground acting schools were also created. Underground actors, many of whom officially worked mundane jobs, included Karol Adwentowicz, Elżbieta Barszczewska, Henryk Borowski, Wojciech Brydziński, Władysław Hańcza, Stefan Jaracz, Tadeusz Kantor, Mieczysław Kotlarczyk, Bohdan Korzeniowski, Jan Kreczmar, Adam Mularczyk, Andrzej Pronaszko, Leon Schiller, Arnold Szyfman, Stanisława Umińska, Edmund Wierciński, Maria Wiercińska, Karol Wojtyła (who later became Pope John Paul II), Marian Wyrzykowski, Jerzy Zawieyski and others. Theater was also active in the Jewish ghettos and in the camps for Polish war prisoners.

Polish music, including orchestras, also went underground. Top Polish musicians and directors (Adam Didur, Zbigniew Drzewiecki, Jan Ekier, Barbara Kostrzewska, Zygmunt Latoszewski, Jerzy Lefeld, Witold Lutosławski, Andrzej Panufnik, Piotr Perkowski, Edmund Rudnicki, Eugenia Umińska, Jerzy Waldorff, Kazimierz Wiłkomirski, Maria Wiłkomirska, Bolesław Woytowicz, Mira Zimińska) performed in restaurants, cafes, and private homes, with the most daring singing patriotic ballads on the streets while evading German patrols. Patriotic songs were written, such as Siekiera, motyka, the most popular song of occupied Warsaw. Patriotic puppet shows were staged. Jewish musicians (e.g. Władysław Szpilman) and artists likewise performed in ghettos and even in concentration camps. Although many of them died, some survived abroad, like Alexandre Tansman in the United States, and Eddie Rosner and Henryk Wars in the Soviet Union.

Visual arts were practiced underground as well. Cafes, restaurants and private homes were turned into galleries or museums; some were closed, with their owners, staff and patrons harassed, arrested or even executed. Polish underground artists included Eryk Lipiński, Stanisław Miedza-Tomaszewski, Stanisław Ostoja-Chrostowski, and Konstanty Maria Sopoćko. Some artists worked directly for the Underground State, forging money and documents, and creating anti-Nazi art (satirical posters and caricatures) or Polish patriotic symbols (for example kotwica). These works were reprinted on underground presses, and those intended for public display were plastered to walls or painted on them as graffiti. Many of these activities were coordinated under the Action N Operation of Armia Krajowa's Bureau of Information and Propaganda. In 1944 three giant (6 m, or 20 ft) puppets, caricatures of Hitler and Benito Mussolini, were successfully displayed in public places in Warsaw. Some artists recorded life and death in occupied Poland; despite German bans on Poles using cameras, photographs and even films were taken. Although it was impossible to operate an underground radio station, underground auditions were recorded and introduced into German radios or loudspeaker systems. Underground postage stamps were designed and issued. Since the Germans also banned Polish sport activities, underground sport clubs were created; underground football matches and even tournaments were organized in Warsaw, Kraków and Poznań, although these were usually dispersed by the Germans. All of these activities were supported by the Underground State's Department of Culture.

=== Warsaw Uprising ===
Polish Radio broadcast in English.
An English-language news program describing the daily fighting during the Warsaw Uprising, broadcast by Polish insurgents radio station Błyskawica.

During the Warsaw Uprising (August–October 1944), people in Polish-controlled territory endeavored to recreate the former day-to-day life of their free country. Cultural life was vibrant among both soldiers and the civilian population, with theaters, cinemas, post offices, newspapers and similar activities available. The 10th Underground Tournament of Poetry was held during the Uprising, with prizes being weaponry (most of the Polish poets of the younger generation were also members of the resistance). Headed by Antoni Bohdziewicz, the Home Army's Bureau of Information and Propaganda even created three newsreels and over 30,000 metres (98,425 ft) of film documenting the struggle. Eugeniusz Lokajski took some 1,000 photographs before he died; Sylwester Braun some 3,000, of which 1,500 survive; Jerzy Tomaszewski some 1,000, of which 600 survived.

== Culture in exile ==
Polish artists also worked abroad, outside of occupied Europe. Arkady Fiedler, based in Britain with the Polish Armed Forces in the West wrote about the 303 Polish Fighter Squadron. Melchior Wańkowicz wrote about the Polish contribution to the capture of Monte Cassino in Italy. Other writers working abroad included Jan Lechoń, Antoni Słonimski, Kazimierz Wierzyński and Julian Tuwim. There were artists who performed for the Polish forces in the West as well as for the Polish forces in the East. Among musicians who performed for the Polish II Corps in a Polska Parada cabaret were Henryk Wars and Irena Anders. The most famous song of the soldiers fighting under the Allies was the Czerwone maki na Monte Cassino (The Red Poppies on Monte Cassino), composed by Feliks Konarski and Alfred Schultz in 1944. There were also Polish theaters in exile in both the East and the West. Several Polish painters, mostly soldiers of the Polish II Corps, kept working throughout the war, including Tadeusz Piotr Potworowski, Adam Kossowski, Marian Kratochwil, Bolesław Leitgeber and Stefan Knapp.

== Influence on postwar culture ==
Rozstrzelanie V (Execution by Firing Squad, V) (1949) by Andrzej Wróblewski, set in German-occupied Poland

The wartime attempts to destroy Polish culture may have strengthened it instead. Norman Davies wrote in God's Playground: "In 1945, as a prize for untold sacrifices, the attachment of the survivors to their native culture was stronger than ever before." Similarly, close-knit underground classes, from primary schools to universities, were renowned for their high quality, due in large part to the lower ratio of students to teachers. The resulting culture was, however, different from the culture of interwar Poland for a number of reasons. The destruction of Poland's Jewish community, Poland's postwar territorial changes, and postwar migrations left Poland without its historic ethnic minorities. The multicultural nation was no more.

The experience of World War II placed its stamp on a generation of Polish artists that became known as the "Generation of Columbuses". The term denotes an entire generation of Poles, born soon after Poland regained independence in 1918, whose adolescence was marked by World War II. In their art, they "discovered a new Poland"—one forever changed by the atrocities of World War II and the ensuing creation of a communist Poland.

Over the years, nearly three-quarters of the Polish people have emphasized the importance of World War II to the Polish national identity. Many Polish works of art created since the war have centered on events of the war. Books by Tadeusz Borowski, Adolf Rudnicki, Henryk Grynberg, Miron Białoszewski, Hanna Krall and others; films, including those by Andrzej Wajda (A Generation, Kanał, Ashes and Diamonds, Lotna, A Love in Germany, Korczak, Katyń); TV series (Four Tank Men and a Dog and Stakes Larger than Life); music (Powstanie Warszawskie); and even comic books—all of these diverse works have reflected those times. Polish historian Tomasz Szarota wrote in 1996:

Educational and training programs place special emphasis on the World War II period and on the occupation. Events and individuals connected with the war are ubiquitous on TV, on radio and in the print media. The theme remains an important element in literature and learning, in film, theater and the fine arts. Not to mention that politicians constantly make use of it. Probably no other country marks anniversaries related to the events of World War II so often or so solemnly.

== See also ==
- Football in occupied Poland (1939–1945)
- Home front during World War II
- Nazi crimes against ethnic Poles
- The Holocaust in Poland
