= Polish literature during World War II =

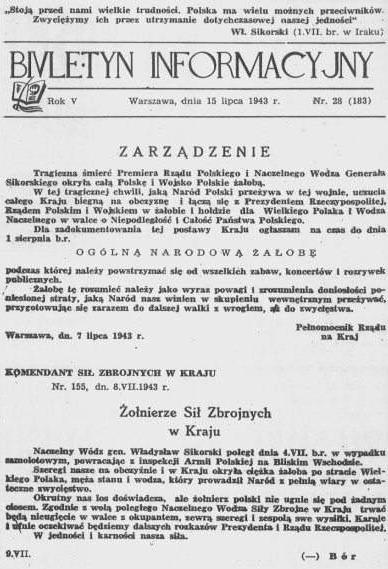
Front page of Polish underground magazine, Biuletyn Informacyjny concerning the death of general Władysław.

The outbreak of World War II in Europe completely changed the situation of Polish cultural and literary life. All institutions were liquidated by the Nazi and Soviet occupiers. Artists were forced to create in secrecy or in exile. Polish Literature during World War II suffered tremendous losses under the occupation; however, writers did continue to produce works both underground (Polska podziemna) and abroad (Polska walcząca).

== Background ==
For the first generation, after gaining independence in 1918, September 1939 began with the darkest scenario. The fledgling country faced again the brutality of war and the sorrow of the loss of freedom. The development of literature and culture however was very active during the German occupation: the underground press was set up and groups of young writers started to form. Warsaw was not only the capital of Poland but also the main cultural capital. Warsaw University started to operate in the underground, which helped to maintain a patriotic spirit, not only in cultural aspects but also in military ones.

People from the "Columbus generation" became the most creative: Krzysztof Kamil Baczyński, Tadeusz Gajcy, and Andrzej Trzebiński were the best known – and established the specifics and tendencies of Polish war literature. In German-occupied territories, there were also active writers from the older generation: Leopold Staff, Maria Dąbrowska, Zofia Nałkowska, Jarosław Iwaszkiewicz, Jerzy Zagórski, and Czesław Miłosz. Writers, who were startled by the invasion by the Soviet Union started to work for the communist monthly magazine Nowe Widnokregi (New Horizons), and many of them worked later in the Union of Polish Patriots). Some of these were: Wanda Wasilewska, Jerzy Putrament, and Adam Ważyk. Many writers were arrested, taken to labour or concentration camps or to Soviet camps.

The voice of writers on emigration was also audible. Many of them found asylum in Great Britain and the United States. In France the weekly magazine Polish News was published. Despite the tough historical circumstances, war literature was very varied in many terms. It was multigenerational work that surprised by its diversity of views and thoughts.

Poetry was the most popular type of literature in those times and the lyrics of young artists (Baczynski, Gajcy, Borowski) characterised the deepest tone. In the time of war and occupation developed also prose writing (Andrzej Trzebiński, Tadeusz Gajcy), where the short forms dominated such as novellas and short stories (Jaroslaw Iwaszkiewicz, Jerzy Andrzejewski). Literature was also the evidence of truth about war, it was notable especially in autobiographical-confessional forms – diaries and memoirs (Maria Dąbrowska, Zofia Nałkowska, Andrzej Trzebinski). During the war, non-fiction blossomed, in an attempt to describe a time of contempt: (Melchior Wańkowicz, Józef Czapski, Gustaw Herling-Grudziński, Borowski).

== The Columbus generation ==
The generation of young writers born around 1920, whose adolescence held during World War II. All of them took part in the resistance against German occupiers and were active during the Warsaw Uprising. Name stemmed from the title of the book The Kolumbs. Year 20 written by Roman Bratny. Representatives of this generation weren't able to lead normal, carefree lives. From the beginning they faced the brutality of the war and had to deal with life during the occupation.

Best known representatives of the Kolumbs generation: Krzysztof Kamil Baczyński, Władysław Bartoszewski, Miron Białoszewski, Teresa Bogusławska, Wacław Bojarski, Tadeusz Borowski, Roman Bratny, Olgierd Budrewicz, Jerzy Ficowski, Tadeusz Gajcy, Gustaw Herling-Grudziński, Krystyna Krahelska, Wojciech Mencel, Włodzimierz Pietrzak, Jan Romocki, Tadeusz Różewicz, Zdzislaw Stroinski, Wisława Szymborska, Andrzej Trzebiński, Józef Szczepański, Zbigniew Herbert.

== "Art and Society" ==
After the September defeat, culture was assessed as an important psychological factor responsible for collective fate. Writers started to confront reality with literature from twenties of the interwar era, young poets found their own point of view and started to shape the attitudes of Polish society in face of the war. At that time poets were no longer unreasonable romantic artists, as it was before the war, but they were soldiers, who also felt as the voice of Polish nation. Young writers reinterpreted old writings giving them a new meaning, where valuation of the past gained new, moral dimension.

All of their views were described in well-known underground magazine Sztuka i Naród ("Art and Society"). The stories of its editors revealed a hopeless battle for independence: Onufry Bronislaw Kopczynski – first organizer of the magazine, were shot in camp in Majdanek, Waclaw Bojarski – his associate, died from injuries after the action under Mikolaj Kopernik monument, Andrzej Trzebinski, one of the last directors, was shot dead in a public execution in November 1943, and Tadeusz Gajcy died during the Warsaw Uprising in 1944.

=== Krzysztof Kamil Baczyński ===
Krzysztof Kamil Baczyński (Jan Bugaj) born in Warsaw on 22 January 1921, was one of the best known Polish war poets; a soldier of the Home Army, involved also in operations of scouts (Szare Szeregi), a representative of "Kolumbs generation". Baczynski had Polish-Jewish origins. He attended to secondary school of Stefan Batory, where he was known as an extremely intelligent boy. At the same school he met his future war companions (Tadeusz Zawadzki "Zoska", Jan Bytnar "Rudy", Maciej Aleksy Dawidowski "Alek"). He studied Polish Literature at the unofficial Warsaw University, but he dropped out to take up for conspiracy and poetry.

During the war he issued 4 volumes of his poetry. His poems, although strongly knitted with the topic of war, showed its universal dimension, he broached timeless topics: human spirit, mind, reflections on youth and adolescence, he tackled with an inevitable apocalypse. He was conscious of the wreck of his generation, but at the same time he seemed to come to terms with this thought. His best-known writing are: Elegy about...Polish boy, Mazovia, History, Gaze, White Magic, Generation. He died at the beginning of the Warsaw Uprising on 4 August 1944.

=== Tadeusz Gajcy ===
Tadeusz Gajcy ("Karol Topornicki", "Roman Oscien") was born on 8 February 1922, a poet, a soldier of the Home Army. He studied in a famous catholic secondary school, he was also an altar boy in the Saint John's Church. In 1941 he passed his school final exams and started studying Polish Literature at Warsaw University. During the war he was the last director of magazine Art and Society. His poems are replete with sincere but difficult patriotism. His famous writings are: "Hit", "Uniform Chant", "Rhapsody about Warsaw". He died in the Warsaw Uprising on 22 August 1944.

== Bibliography ==
- Tomasz Wroczyński, Literatura polska po 1939 roku, WSiP 1996
- Józef Lewandowski, Wokół biografii K. K. Baczyńskiego, Szkło bolesne, obraz dni. Eseje nieprzedawnione, Ex Libris, Uppsala 1991
