= Generation of Columbuses =

Polish generation born after Poland's independence in 1918

The Generation of Columbuses (Polish: Pokolenie Kolumbów, [pɔ.kɔˈlɛ.ɲɛ kɔˈlum.buf]), also known as the Generation of 1920, is a term denoting the generation of Poles who were born soon after Poland regained its independence in 1918, and whose entry into adulthood was marked by World War II.

The term was coined by Roman Bratny in his 1957 novel Kolumbowie. Rocznik 20. Referring to Christopher Columbus, Bratny described the entire generation of Poles as people who "discovered Poland". The term is generally applied to young intelligentsia, but also includes all young people who, instead of living a traditional young adulthood, had to fight against foreign occupation and study at secret universities.

== Notable people ==
Among the notable people commonly associated with the generation are:

- Krzysztof Kamil Baczyński, a catastrophist poet who was killed in the Warsaw Uprising
- Władysław Bartoszewski
- Miron Białoszewski, a poet and a writer
- Teresa Bogusławska, a poet, arrested by the Gestapo and imprisoned in the Pawiak; died of meningitis in 1945
- Wacław Bojarski, a wartime poet and journalist of underground newspapers, died 1943
- Tadeusz Borowski, a poet and writer who survived Auschwitz-Birkenau and the Dachau concentration camp only to commit suicide in 1951
- Roman Bratny, writer; author of his 1957 novel Kolumbowie. Rocznik 20
- Olgierd Budrewicz, journalist and Varsavianist
- Grażyna Chrostowska, a poet, activist of the Polish underground; deported to the Ravensbrück concentration camp and executed
- Jerzy Ficowski, poet, journalist, ethnologist, pioneer of research on post-war Jewish and Romani life in Poland
- Tadeusz Gajcy, a poet, killed in the Warsaw Uprising
- Stanisław Grzesiuk
- Zbigniew Herbert
- Gustaw Herling-Grudziński
- Krystyna Krahelska, a girl-guide, poet and singer, model for the monument of the Warsaw's Siren, killed in the Warsaw Uprising
- Stanisław Lem
- Stanisław Likiernik
- Wojciech Mencel, a poet killed in the Warsaw Uprising
- Włodzimierz Pietrzak, an art critic and author, killed in the Warsaw Uprising
- Jan Romocki, a scouting instructor and poet, died in the Warsaw Uprising
- Tadeusz Różewicz
- Stanisław Staszewski
- Zdzisław Stroiński, a poet killed in the Warsaw Uprising
- Józef Szczepański, a poet killed in the Warsaw Uprising
- Andrzej Szczypiorski
- Andrzej Trzebiński, a poet, dramatist and novelist, arrested by the Germans and shot to death in 1943
- Karol Wojtyła, Pope John Paul II (1978–2005)

== See also ==
- Polish culture during World War II
