= Konstanty =

Konstanty is a Polish-language given name and a surname, a variant of Constantine. Notable people with the name include:

== Given name ==
- Konstanty Adam Czartoryski (1777–1866), Polish prince, Brigadier General
- Konstanty Andrzej Kulka (born 1947), Polish violinist, recording artist, and professor
- Konstanty Borzęcki (1826–1876), participant in Polish and Ottoman uprisings, known as Mustafa Celalettin Pasha
- Konstanty Brandel (1880–1970), Polish painter, notable contributor to the Young Poland movement
- Konstanty Branicki (1824–1884), Polish collector and naturalist who established a private museum of natural history
- Konstanty Budkiewicz (1867–1923), Roman Catholic priest executed by the OGPU for organizing Nonviolent resistance against the First Soviet anti-religious campaign
- Konstanty Dombrowicz (born 1947), Polish journalist, politician and President of Bydgoszcz
- Konstanty Gebert (born 1953), Polish-Jewish journalist and activist
- Konstanty Gorski (1859–1924), Polish composer, violinist, organist
- Konstanty Górski (1868–1934), Polish painter and illustrator
- Konstanty Hrynakowski (1878–1938), Polish chemist
- Konstanty Ildefons Gałczyński (1905–1953), Polish poet
- Konstanty Jacek Lubomirski (1620–1663), Polish prince
- Konstanty Jeleński (1922–1987), Polish essayist
- Konstanty Jelski (1837–1896), Polish ornithologist and zoologist who explored French Guiana
- Konstanty Jodko-Narkiewicz (1901–1963), Polish geophysicist who specialized in studying cosmic radiation
- Konstanty Kaiszauri (born 1952), Poland born Swedish chess International Master
- Konstanty Kalinowski (1838–1864), Polish-Belarusian writer, journalist, lawyer and revolutionary
- Konstanty Kapuścik (dead 1943), member of the Gestapo killed by a partisan death squad, known as Helmut Kapp
- Konstanty Kazimierz Brzostowski (1644–1722), Polish noble, count of the Holy See, and papal prelate
- Konstanty Kurnatowski (187–-1968), bishop
- Konstanty Korniakt (1517–1603), Polish merchant of Greek descent
- Konstanty Korniakt of Białobok (1582–1624), Polish nobleman and soldier
- Konstanty Laszczka (1865–1956), Polish sculptor, painter, professor and rector of the Jan Matejko Academy of Fine Arts in Kraków
- Konstanty Ludwik Plater (1722–1778), Polish noble, Castellan and voivode
- Konstanty Mackiewicz (1894–1985), Polish painter
- Konstanty Majeranowski (1787–1851), Polish journalist, poet
- Konstanty Maria Sopoćko (1903–1992), Polish artist, specializing in woodcutting
- Konstanty Miodowicz (1951–2013), Polish politician
- Konstanty Ostrogski (1460–1530), Grand Hetman of Lithuania
- Konstanty Plisowski (1890–1940), Polish general and military commander
- Konstanty Pociejkewicz (1932–2003), Polish speedway rider
- Konstanty Radziwiłł (born 1958), Polish politician, physician
- Konstanty Rokicki (1899–1958), Polish consular officer, Righteous Among the Nations
- Konstanty Rokossowski (1896–1968), Soviet and Polish officer, Marshal of the Soviet Union of Poland
- Konstanty Szyrwid (1579–1631), religious preacher, lexicographer and one of the pioneers of Lithuanian literature
- Konstanty Skirmunt (1866–1949), Polish politician
- Konstanty Troczyński (1906–1942), Polish literature theoretician and critic, murdered in the German concentration camp Auschwitz
- Konstanty Tyszkiewicz (1806–1868), Polish-Lithuanian noble, archaeologist and ethnographer
- Konstanty Tyzenhauz (1786–1853), Polish-Lithuanian nobleman, naturalist, artist, and sponsor of ornithology
- Konstanty Wasyl Ostrogski (1526–1608), prince, Ruthenian Orthodox magnate of the Polish–Lithuanian Commonwealth
- Konstanty Wileński (born 1949), Polish-Ukrainian pianist, composer and jazz musician
- Konstanty Wiśniowiecki (1564–1641), Polish nobleman, voivode of Belz
- Konstanty Władysław Sobieski (1680–1726), Polish prince, son of John III Sobieski
- Konstanty Zakrzewski (1876–1948), Polish physicist
- Konstanty Zamoyski (1799–1866), Polish nobleman

== Second given name ==
- Gustaw Konstanty Orlicz-Dreszer (1889–1936), Polish general, political and social activist
- Jerzy Konstanty Broel-Plater (1810–1836), bibliographer and researcher of the Lithuanian language and literature
- Jerzy Konstanty Czartoryski (1828–1912), Polish noble and politician
- Józef Konstanty Olszyna-Wilczyński (1890–1939), Polish general
- Juliusz Konstanty Ordon (1810–1887), participant of the Polish November Uprising
- Mikołaj Konstanty Czurlanis (1875–1911), Lithuanian painter, composer and writer
- Teodor Konstanty Lubomirski (1683–1745), Polish prince
- Władysław Konstanty Vasa, Count of Wasenau (1635–1698), illegitimate son of Władysław IV Vasa

== Last name ==
- Jim Konstanty (1917–1976), American professional baseball player
