= Ferdynand Goetel =

Polish writer

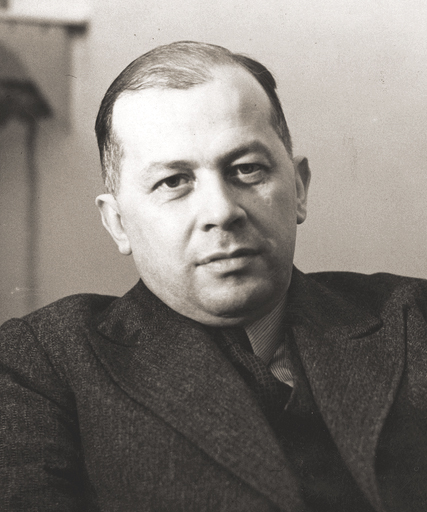
- Born: 15 May 1890; Sucha Beskidzka
- Died: 24 November 1960 (aged 70); London
- Writing career
- Notable works: Samuel Zborowski; Czasy wojny (Wartime, memoirs)

Ferdynand Goetel (15 May 1890 – 24 November 1960) was a Polish novelist, playwright, essayist, screen writer, and political activist. He was a member of the prestigious Polish Academy of Literature from 1935, president of the Polish PEN Club from 1926–33, and president of the Union of Polish Writers in the interwar Poland. He achieved prominence in Polish literary circles between the wars and was awarded the "Golden Laurel" by the Polish Academy of Literature for his contributions to Polish literature. He was forced to leave Poland after World War II due to his involvement in the German investigation of the Katyn massacre and died in exile in London.

== Early years ==
Goetel was born at Sucha Beskidzka near Kraków. He attended schools in Kraków and Lvov but was not considered a model pupil. He later admitted in his memoirs that he was "considered wayward, rebellious, and even insolent," getting into trouble for secretly smoking cigars, gambling, and distributing photographs of women. He was expelled from several schools. He was sent to a military school before attending the imperial secondary school (Szkoła realna), from which he graduated.Realschule Goetel subsequently studied architecture at the Vienna University of Technology, where his talent earned him a scholarship.

He moved back to Warsaw in 1912 but, as an Austrian citizen in Russian-ruled Poland, was arrested and interned by the Russian authorities at the outbreak of World War I. The Russian authorities sent him to an internment camp at Tashkent in Turkestan, where he was put to work on road and bridge construction. After the Russian Revolution, he served with the Red Army in the Caucasus for a while, an experience he later used as the basis for his 1922 novel Kar Chat, about the Russian Civil War in the Caucasus. In December 1919, as the situation in Russia deteriorated and his newly married wife Jadwiga was pregnant, he decided to escape to Poland. The journey took the couple fourteen months, via Persia, Afghanistan, India, and England, before they arrived back in the newly independent Republic of Poland in January 1921.

== Literary career during the inter-war years ==
Goetel's experiences in Russia prompted him to become a staunch anti-communist. The events of his internment, exile, and escape were described in his memoir Przez płonący Wschód (Across The Burning East, 1923), and in his 1929 novel From Day to Day, about the Russian internment camp. He was elected president of the Polish PEN Club from 1926–33 and also served as president of the Trade Union of Polish Writers. In 1936, he was accepted as a member of the Polish Academy of Literature.

During the inter-war years, Goetel wrote a number of novels and travel books that were well received. From Day to Day was translated into a number of languages and was filmed by Józef Lejtes. He also wrote for the theatre; his play Samuel Zborowski about the 1584 beheading of Samuel Zborowski was performed in Warsaw at Teatr Polski in 1929 with Marian Jednowski in the title role and Kazimierz Junosza-Stępowski as King Stefan Batory.

== Wartime years and exile ==
Goetel joined the Polish resistance movement Armia Krajowa (AK, or Home Army) in World War II, and was temporarily imprisoned in Pawiak by the SS. He has sometimes been described as the "last victim of Katyn". He was blacklisted in post-war Poland (1945–1989) and driven out of the country in 1945 with an arrest warrant issued by the secret police. This was because the Germans had arranged for him to participate in the investigation of the Katyn massacre on behalf of the AK, and because in his postwar writings he demanded justice for the victims of Katyn. Goetel was proposed as a witness for the Katyn delegation by lawyer Ludwig Fischer, the German governor of Warsaw. However, the Polish delegation ultimately refused to assist Nazi propaganda efforts further and secretly informed the Polish government-in-exile about their findings.

The first arrest warrants against Goetel were issued in July 1945. For the next several months, he stayed in hiding at the Carmelite convent in Kraków. Then, in December 1945, he escaped to Italy on a false passport. He joined the Polish Army of General Anders and, at the conclusion of World War II, went to London. He lived there until his death in 1960. In exile, he primarily wrote memoirs and fiction based on his own life experiences.

His grave is located in the North Sheen Cemetery.

== Works ==
- Kar Chat (1922)
- Przez płonący Wschód (Warsaw 1922)
- Pątnik Karapeta... (1923)
- Ludzkość (Warsaw 1925)
- Z dnia na dzień (Warsaw 1926)
- Egipt (Lwów 1927)
- Humoreski (1927)
- Wyspa na chmurnej północy (Warsaw 1928)
- Samuel Zborowski (1929)
- Serce lodów (1930)

- The Ten from Pawiak Prison (screenplay, 1931)
- Podróż do Indii (Warsaw 1933)
- Dzień wielkiej przygody (screenplay, 1935)
- Pod znakiem faszyzmu (1938)
- Cyklon (Warsaw 1939)
- Czasy wojny (memoirs, London 1955)
- Nie warto być małym (1959)
- Anakonda (after his death, 1964)
- Patrząc wstecz (memoir, after his death, London 1966)

== See also ==
- Polish literature
- Polish literature during World War II
- Józef Mackiewicz, writer blacklisted in communist Poland for assisting in the first excavations of the mass graves of Polish soldiers killed by Soviet NKVD in the 1940 Katyn massacre
