= Józef Mackiewicz =

Polish writer (1902–1985)

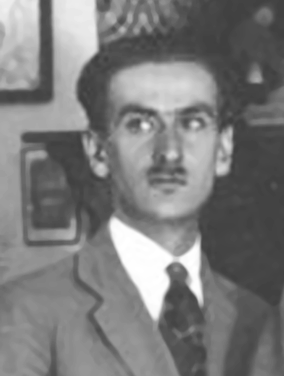
- Mackiewicz in Wilno; before 1939
- Born: 1 April 1902; Saint Petersburg
- Died: 31 January 1985 (aged 82); Munich
- Occupation: Novelist

Józef Mackiewicz (1 April 1902 – 31 January 1985) was a Polish writer, novelist and political commentator; best known for his documentary novels Droga donikąd (The Road to Nowhere) and Nie trzeba głośno mówić (One Is Not Supposed to Speak Aloud). He staunchly opposed communism, referring to himself as an "anticommunist by nationality". Mackiewicz died in exile. His older brother Stanisław "Cat" Mackiewicz was also a writer.

== Life and career ==
Józef Mackiewicz was the son of Antoni Mackiewicz and Maria née Pietraszkiewicz originally from Kraków, a Polish noble family from the Polish-Lithuanian gentry of Bożawola coat of arms. He was born on 1 April 1902 in Saint Petersburg. Józef Mackiewicz was the younger brother of Stanisław Mackiewicz, a political publicist and Prime Minister of the postwar Polish government in exile from 1954 to 1955; and Seweryna Mackiewicz, mother of Polish writer Kazimierz Orłoś.

In 1907 his family moved to Vilnius. In 1919, as a 17-year-old volunteer he participated in the Polish–Soviet War, first, as an uhlan of the Polish Army's 10th Lithuanian Uhlan Regiment, and then of the 13th Wilno Uhlan Regiment. He finished his military service during Poland's fight of independence as an uhlan of the 211th Niemen Volunteer Uhlan Regiment. Similar to other young veterans of the war who entered university without their Matura graduation, Mackiewicz started his favourite subject of biological sciences at the University of Warsaw and then upon moving to Vilnius continued studies at the Vilnius University, but he never graduated with a degree. From 1923 he worked as a journalist for Słowo (The Word), a periodical published in Vilnius by his older brother Stanisław and fully sponsored and financed by the old noble families of the former Grand Duchy of Lithuania. Journalist work took him all over the Baltic republics and eastern Poland.

Mackiewicz married Antonina Kopańska with whom he had a daughter Halina, and upon divorce he was in a long-term relationship with Wanda Żyłowska, with whom he had a daughter Idalia. Then he began his lifelong relationship with a writer and journalist of Vilnius' Słowo Barbara Toporska, but they had no children. They married in 1939. Józef Mackiewicz's nephew was Kazimierz Orłoś.

=== World War II ===
On 17 September 1939 Soviet troops attacked eastern Poland as part of the joint German-Soviet Invasion of Poland. Upon the division of the country by occupying forces, the Vilnius region was transferred to then independent Lithuania. On the 18th, Mackiewicz published an article expressing joy at the Bolshevik's withdrawal from Vilnius, resulting in him being accused of anti-Polonism and pro-Lithuanianism. Mackiewicz remained in Vilnius, and between October 1939 and May 1940 he was a publisher and editor-in-chief of the Gazeta Codzienna (Daily Paper), a Polish-language an anti-nationalist and anti-Soviet daily in Lithuanian-controlled Vilnius. In his articles, he attempted to initiate a political dialogue between Lithuanians and Poles. In May 1940, he was forbidden from further roles as a publisher and journalist by the Lithuanian government.

After the 15 June 1940 invasion and annexation of Lithuania by the Soviet Union, Mackiewicz gave up his professional activity and worked as a lumberjack and wagon driver. In June 1941, the Germans occupied Lithuania. For the first four months of the occupation, Mackiewicz again worked as a journalist for the German-issued Polish-language newspaper Goniec Codzienny, in which he published several anti-Soviet articles, and excerpts from one of his books.

In 1942, he witnessed the Ponary massacre of some 100,000 mostly Polish Jews by German SD, SS and the Lithuanian Nazi collaborators Ypatingasis būrys, which he described in his 1969 book Nie trzeba głośno mówić (One Is Not Supposed to Speak Aloud). At the end of 1942 (beginning of 1943) he was sentenced to death by the resistance for his work at Gazeta Codzienna and Goniec Codzienny. The sentence was not carried out, and later formally cancelled.

=== Discovery of Katyń Forest Massacre ===
In April 1943 Mackiewicz was invited by the international Katyn Commission, headed by German occupying authorities, to the site of Katyn massacre. Upon consent of the Polish government-in-exile, he assisted in the first excavations of the mass graves of the Polish officers killed by Soviet NKVD there in 1940. Upon his return to Vilnius, the local German-sponsored daily Goniec Codzienny published an interview with Mackiewicz titled "Widziałem na własne oczy" ("I saw with my own eyes"). He later arrived in Italy where he worked for the II Corps (Poland) and, in this capacity, he edited a compilation of documents related directly to the Katyń Massacre under the title Zbrodnia katyńska w świetle dokumentów (The Katyn murder in light of new evidence), published in 1948 with an introduction by General Władysław Anders. At the same time he wrote his own book under the title Katyń. Zbrodnia bez sądu i kary (Katyn. Murder without Trial nor Sentence). Its first Polish language publication was destroyed by the publisher in London, UK, for political reasons. In 1949 he published its German language version, Katyn – ungesühntes Verbrechen, in Zürich, Switzerland. In 1951 he published the English-version of his book under a title The Katyn Wood Murders, the very first book in English on the subject (Italian version in 1954 as Il Massacro della foresta di Katyn, in Spanish in 1957 as Las Fosas de Katyn, in Russian published in Canada in 1988 as Катынь). In 1952 he testified before the US Senate Committee known as "Select Committee to Investigate and Study the Facts, Evidence, and Circumstances of the Katyn Forest Massacre" about the genocidal nature the Katyń Massacre (the Polish version of Katyń. Zbrodnia bez sądu i kary was published in 1997 in Poland, and again under different title: Sprawa mordu katyńskiego. Ta książka była pierwsza in 2009).

=== Accusations of Collaboration with Nazi Germany ===
In 1942, Mackiewicz was accused of collaboration with the Germans during the occupation due to his work as a journalist and publisher at Gazeta Codzienna and Goniec Codzienny. In these articles, Mackiewicz put forth several ideas, notably that a return to the prewar borders of Poland was a pipe-dream and not a useful premise, which some local Poles then considered unthinkable.

He also proclaimed that opposing just one invader, Germany (as did the Polish Resistance), was synonymous with helping the second invader, the Soviet Union, because their intentions were identical, but that opposing communism was more important.

During the first four months of the German occupation, Mackiewicz worked as a journalist for the Nazi-controlled Polish-language propaganda newspaper Goniec Codzienny, in which he published several anti-Soviet articles, and excerpts from his novel Droga Donikąd (The Road to Nowhere).

This work under the Nazi occupation, and skepticism of a return to pre-war Polish borders, resulted in him being sentenced to death by the Special Court of the Home Army (Polish underground resistance), however this was never carried out and later formally cancelled. The circumstances around this are unclear

According to Czesław Miłosz, he was not a collaborator. Miłosz says that In 1947, Mackiewicz was completely cleared of any wrongdoing, and that It is open to debate how much the popular criticism of his novels was influenced by the Soviet sympathies of his adversaries.

The accusations negatively influenced the Polish perceptions of Mackiewicz and his work, especially following World War II.

== Exile ==
Mackiewicz and his wife Barbara Toporska left Vilnius and lived in Warsaw until 31 July 1944, when they left for Kraków and then finally left Poland for Rome in January 1945, never to return. They first lived in Italy and he started publishing in various émigré publications like "Kultura" in Paris and many others. In 1948 they moved to London and he continued writing and publishing. In 1955 he and his wife Barbara Toporska moved permanently to Munich, Where he continued to write on variety of topics and also published plenty of fiction and articles. He lived on the verge of poverty, supporting himself by writing and his wife’s handicraft. Mackiewicz died in Munich on 31 January 1985, and was buried in the St Andrew Bobola Polish Church in London

== Works ==
Mackiewicz's prose is extremely realistic: he believed that there are no untouchable subjects in writing. In 1957, he published Kontra, a narrative account of the particularly brutal and treacherous handover of thousands of anti-Soviet Cossacks back to the Soviets by the British soldiers in Austria; and in 1962 Sprawa pulkownika Miasojedowa ("Colonel Miasoyedov's Case"), a harshly realistic novel of the bombing of Dresden in World War II. His other best-known novels include: Droga donikąd ("The Road to Nowhere"), an account of life under Soviet occupation; Zwycięstwo prowokacji ("Victory of Provocation") on communism; and W cieniu krzyża ("In the Shadow of the Cross") on Catholicism. His voluminous output as a writer of fiction and a publicist has been undergoing a revival after many years of underground publishing and later marginal interest. His books have been published since 1972 by the KONTRA Publishing House of London, UK, owned by Nina Karsov-Szechter. In 2009 Nina Karsov-Szechter received an award of the Union of Polish Writers Abroad as the editor of works by Józef Mackiewicz.

== Popular culture ==
Józef Mackiewicz is the subject of two documentaries made after his death. First was the film „Jedynie prawda jest ciekawa” (Only the truth is interesting) by Robert Kaczmarek made for Polish TV in 1996, and then in 2008 a short film „Errata do biografii – Józef Mackiewicz” (Correction to biography - Józef Mackiewicz) by Grzegorz Braun. His life and works are the subject of more than 30 scholarly works, as well as articles, websites and blogs.

== See also ==
- Polish literature
- Polish literature during World War II
- Ferdynand Goetel, writer blacklisted in communist Poland for participating in the original delegation to Katyn, regarding mass graves of Polish soldiers killed by Soviet NKVD in the 1940 Katyn massacre
- Website dedicated Jozef Mackiewicz
