= Czarnota =

Czarnota is a Polish surname derived from the color black. Notable people with the surname include:

- Joseph Czarnota (1925–1968), American Olympic ice hockey player
- Paweł Czarnota (born 1988), Polish chess grandmaster
- Wacław Bojarski (1921–1943) Polish poet and magazine editor, known by the pseudonym Czarnota
