= Bożawola coat of arms =

Polish coat of arms

Bożawola
- Alternative name: Boża Wola
- Earliest mention: 1428
- Towns: none
- Families: 35 names altogether: Artyński, Bachmatowicz, Bańkowski, Boch, Broszkowski, Chaćbiejewicz, Chażbijewicz, Chrostnica, Drawdzik, Druszkiewicz, Dzius, Dziusa, Dziusz, Gąsecki, Gościemiński, Gościmiński, Górski, Jemielicki, Jemielita, Kołupajło, Komorowski, Kościmiński, Madyjowski, Moyrzym, Olsztynie, Olsztyński, Ostrowiec, Poznański, Rejmunt, Reymunt, Romanowski, Rowiński, Rzeczkowski, Szczyrkowski, Szczyrski

Bożawola is a Polish coat of arms. It was used by several szlachta families.

== Notable bearers ==
Notable bearers of this coat of arms include:

- Wojciech Górski - first bishop of Kielce
- Franciszek Górski - general
- Ludwik Górski - astronomer
- Stanisław Mackiewicz - publicist
- Józef Mackiewicz - writer

== See also ==
- Polish heraldry
- Heraldic family
- List of Polish nobility coats of arms

== Bibliography ==
- Tadeusz Gajl: Herbarz polski od średniowiecza do XX wieku : ponad 4500 herbów szlacheckich 37 tysięcy nazwisk 55 tysięcy rodów. L&L, 2007. ISBN 978-83-60597-10-1.
