= Jerzy Zawieyski =

Polish playwright, prose writer, Catholic political activist and stage actor

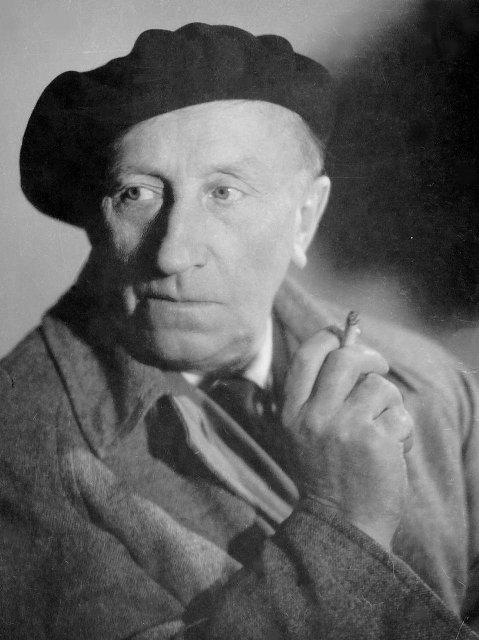
- Born: Henryk Nowicki; 2 October 1902; Radogoszcz, Piotrków Governorate, Congress Poland
- Died: 18 June 1969 (aged 66); Warsaw, Poland
- Occupations: author, playwright, political activist
- Years active: 1921–1968

Jerzy Zawieyski, born Henryk Nowicki, (2 October 1902, Radogoszcz, Piotrków Governorate – 18 June 1969, Warsaw) was a Polish playwright, prose writer, Catholic political activist and amateur stage actor. He wrote psychological, social, moral and historical novels, dramas, stories, essays and journals.

As a secretary of the Towarzystwo Uniwersytetów Robotniczych, he did organizing work for the workers' educational and theatrical movement. Then he was an activist of the Związek Młodzieży Wiejskiej Rzeczypospolitej Polskiej. During the German occupation of Poland, he was active in the underground cultural movement.

== Biography ==
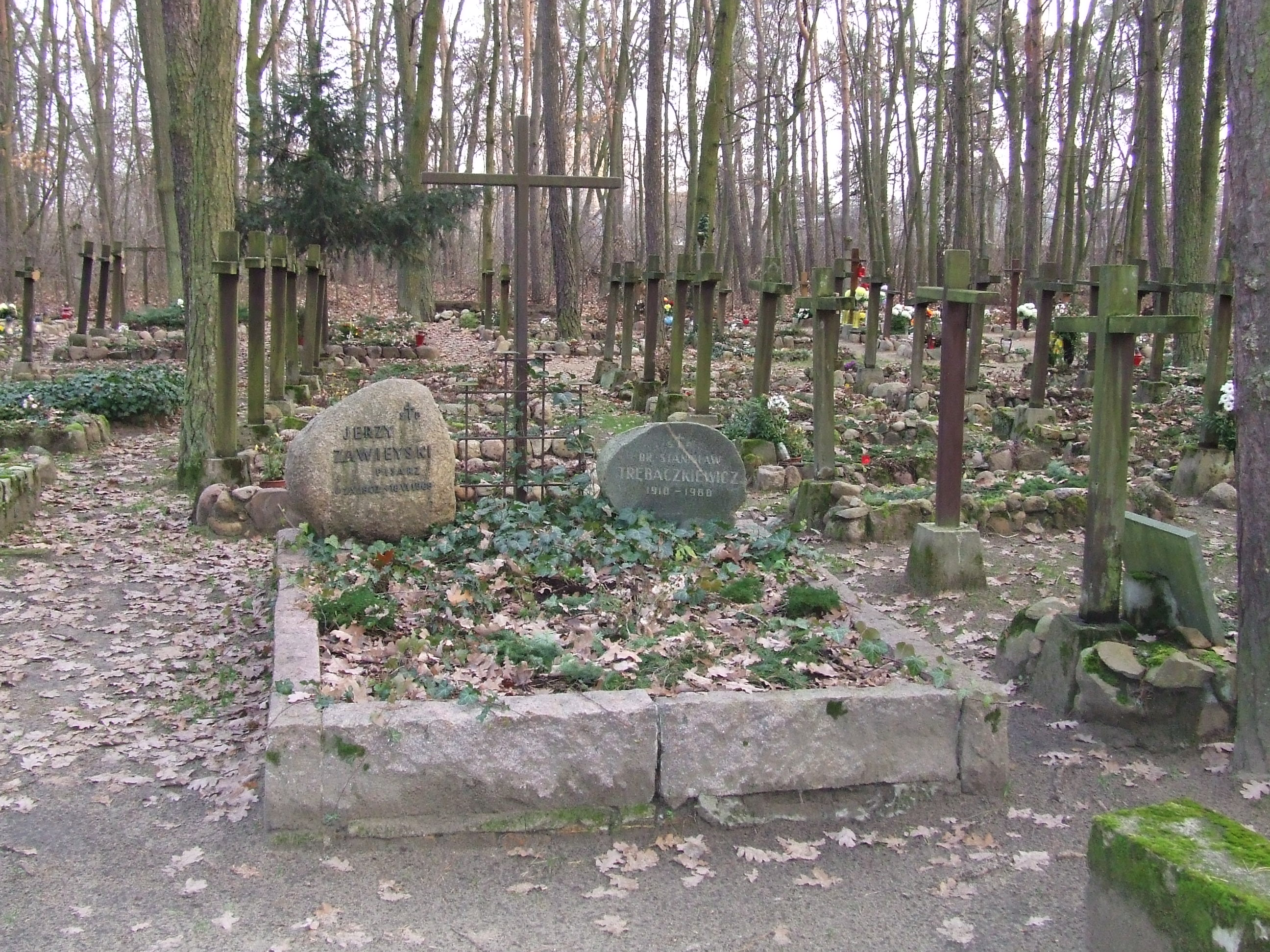
grave of Jerzy Zawieyski and his partner Stanisław Trębaczkiewicz.

In 1921, Zawieyski made his debut with poems (Strzępy) under the pseudonym Konar-Nowicki. In 1926, he graduated from the School of Drama in Kraków. From 1926 to 1928, he was an actor at the Reduta Theatre and editor of the magazine Teatr Ludowy. From 1929 to 1931, he stayed in France, where he worked as an instructor of Polonia amateur drama groups. After returning to Poland, until 1939, he worked as the director of the Instytut Teatrów Ludowych (Institute for Folklore Theaters), actor and literary manager of the Ataneum Theatre. In his youth, Zawieyski had been an atheist and did not convert to Catholicism until the 1930s.

After World War II, Zawieyski worked as a lecturer at the Catholic University of Lublin (Katolicki Uniwersytet Lubelski, KUL). He co-founded the Klub Inteligencji Katolickiej, whose president he was until 1957. He was a member of the editorial boards of Tygodnik Powszechny (From 1946 until 1952, and again from 1956) and Znak (1946–1951 and from 1957). In 1949, he was awarded by the Polish episcopate. In 1957–1969, he was a member of the Sejm of the People's Republic of Poland. In 1957–1968, he was a member of the Polish Council of State when he was removed after a parliamentary protest in connection with the March events.

Zawieyski was homosexual. In 1933 he met Stanisław Trębaczkiewicz. They fell in love and lived together until Zawieyski's death in 1969. They were buried next to each other in the Laski Cemetery near Warsaw.

== Notable works ==
Novels

- Gdzie jesteś, przyjacielu (1932)
- Daleko do rana (1932)
- Droga do domu (1946)
- Wawrzyny i cyprysy (1966)
- Konrad nie chce zejść ze sceny (1966)

Dramas

- Dyktator Faust
- Powrót Przełęckiego
- Mąż doskonały
- Rozdroże miłości
- Rzeka niedoli (1953)
- Tyrteusz
- Pożegnanie z Salomeą

Stories

- Romans z ojczyzną (1963)

Essays

- Próby ognia i czasu (1958)
- Pomiędzy plewą i manną (1971)
- Droga katechumena (1971)

Film scenarios

- Prawdziwy koniec wielkiej wojny (1957)
- Odwiedziny prezydenta (1961)

Memoirs

- Dobrze, że byli (1974)
- Kartki z dziennika 1955-1969 (1983)
