= Konstanty Hrynakowski =

Polish chemist (1878–1938)

Konstanty Hrynakowski (May 21, 1878 – September 4, 1938) was a Polish chemist.

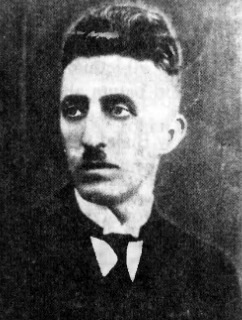
Konstanty Hrynakowski

He studied natural sciences at the St. Vladimir University, branching into inorganic chemistry and mineralogy at the Kiev Polytechnic Institute, and earning a degree in 1904.

Having participated in student riots during the 1905 revolution he was exiled to Siberia, where he worked at the Technological Institute in Tomsk as an assistant professor and physics and chemistry teacher.

He received a scholarship which enabled him to remove to Göttingen in Germany, where he was interned when the First World War broke out. Upon release from the internment camp he moved to Stockholm, where he worked at the High Technical School.

In March 1920 Hryniewiecki became the first director of the Pharmaceutical Chemistry Division at the University of Poznan. He revamped the basement of the Poznan castle to contain chemical and analytic laboratories and initiated the construction of Poznan's Collegium Chemicum.

Hryniewiecki published over 210 pieces, including over 100 scientific studies and several chemistry manuals. He presided over the Poznan branch of the Polish Chemistry Association and was vice-president of the national PCA office.
