= Włodzimierz Słobodnik =

Polish writer, poet, translator (1900–1991)

Włodzimierz Słobodnik (September 19, 1900 in Novoukrainka – July 10, 1991 in Warsaw) was a Polish poet, translator of French, Russian, and Soviet literature, a satirist, and the author of numerous books for young adults.

Słobodnik studied Polish literature at the University of Warsaw. In 1921, his first poems were published in the futurist pamphlet Pam-Bam. During the interwar period he was a member of the literary group "Kwadryga." Between 1932 and 1939 he was the director of the library "Literaria". After the outbreak of World War II he first moved to Lwow (1939–1941), where he was on the editorial board of the Soviet-collaborationist literary magazine Nowe Widnokręgi. After Nazi Germany declared war on the Soviet Union and threatened Lwów, he evacuated to Uzbekistan together with Soviet authorities, where he stayed until the end of the war. Between 1945 and 1956 he lived in Łódź. After 1957 he lived in Warsaw.

He translated many Russian and Soviet texts into Polish, such as works by Mikhail Lermontov, Valery Bryusov, Osip Mandelstam, and Vladimir Mayakovsky. He also translated Baudelaire (from French) and various German authors. His wife, Eleonora Słobodnikowa (1901–1986), was also a translator of Russian and Soviet literature.

He is buried at the Powązki Military Cemetery in Warsaw.
