= Jerzy Zagórski =

Polish poet, essayist and translator

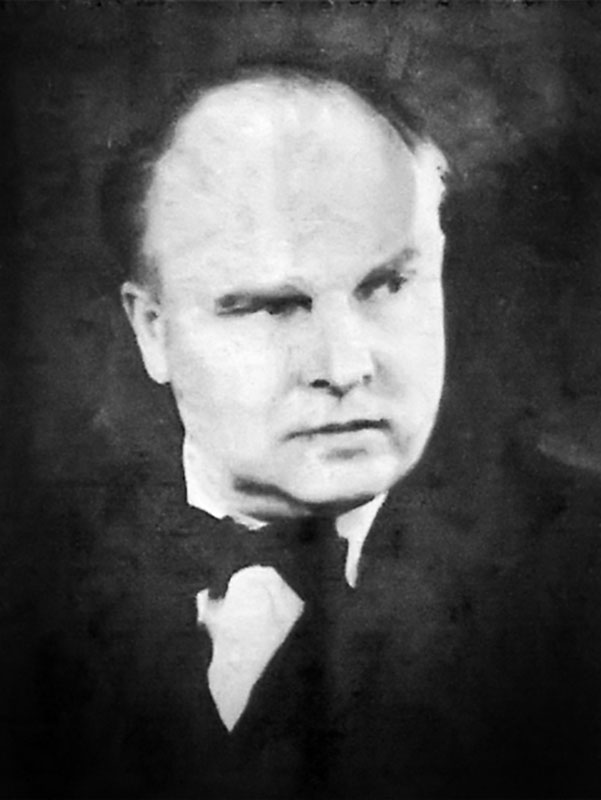
- Born: 3 December 1907; Kiev
- Died: 5 August 1984 (aged 76); Warsaw
- Occupations: poet, essayist, translator
- Spouse: Maryna Zagórska
- Honours: Righteous Among the Nations

Jerzy Zagórski (3 December 1907 – 5 August 1984) was a Polish poet, essayist and translator. Member of literary group Żagary. Awarded the Righteous Among the Nations together with his wife Maria (Maryna) Zagórska, translator of belles-lettres.

== Biography ==
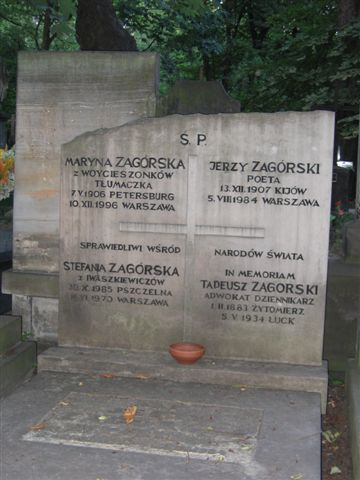
Jerzy Zagorski gravestone

During World War II, Zagórski published texts in the Sztuka i Naród underground magazine.

The Zagórski couple with their three children resided in Bielany, suburb of Warsaw. During the German occupation of Poland they harboured eighteen (18) people of Jewish descent between 1942 and the Warsaw Uprising in 1944. Among them was the poet Tadeusz Holender and Mrs. Kott given the documents of Maria's sister-in-law. Another fugitive, thirteen-year-old boy Janek Wilk, was introduced to neighbors as Maria's nephew. Danuta Grossfeld also spent some months in their home as well as the Tenenbaums (three persons), who found refuge there after fleeing the Ghetto. Their father-in-law, Mr. Kitel came all stained by blood of his wife shot during that escape. People started to talk that the Zagorskis harbor Jews. As a precaution, they placed the boy and Tadeusz Holender with a female friend.

Jerzy and Maria returned to Warsaw in 1945 and found their home ruined. After World War II they maintained contact with Mrs. Kott from the United States and Janek Wilk in Germany. Yad Vashem recognized Maria and Jerzy Zagórski as Righteous Among the Nations in 1977.

== Works ==
- Ostrze mostu (1933)
- Przyjście wroga (a poem; 1934)
- Wyprawy (1937)
- Święto Winkelrida (a drama; written with Jerzy Andrzejewski in 1944, published in 1946)
- Wieczór w Wieliszewie (1947)
- Indie w środku Europy (1947)
- Męska pieśń (1954)
- Czas Lota (1956)
- Olimp i ziemia (1957)
- Krawędź (1959)
- Bajka pienińska (1961)
- Oto nurt (1963)
- Biały bez. Wiersze dla żony (1963)
- Pancerni (a poem; 1964)
- Królestwo ryb (1967)
- Rykoszetem (1969)
- Tam, gdzie diabeł pisze listy (1970)
- Komputerie i dylematy (1975)
