= Teresa Bogusławska =

Polish poet and a participant in the Warsaw Uprising (1929–1945)

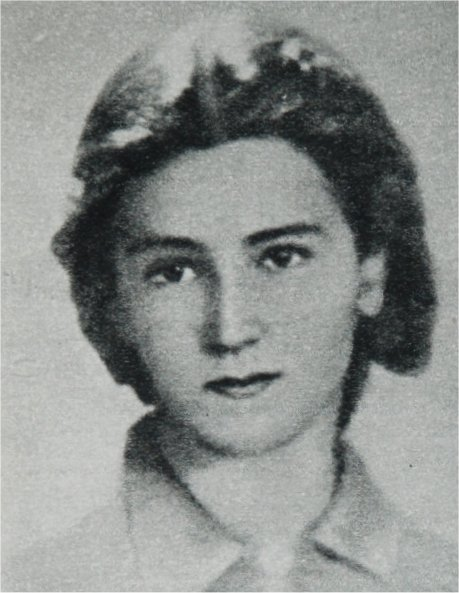
Teresa Bogusławska

Teresa Bogusławska (13 July 1929 – 1 February 1945) was a Polish poet and a participant in the Warsaw Uprising. In 1941 she joined the resistance movement. In February 1944 she was arrested by the Gestapo, imprisoned in the Pawiak prison and tortured during questioning. She was freed in March, suffering from tuberculosis. Her health never recovered. During the Warsaw Uprising, she helped by sewing uniforms and bands for insurgents. She died of meningitis in early 1945, aged 15.
