= Sztuka i Naród =

Polish monthly publication

Sztuka i Naród (Polish pronunciation: [ˈʂtuka i ˈnarud]; Art and Nation) was a Polish monthly published covertly in Warsaw, occupied Poland during World War II. It was supported by the resistance group Confederation of the Nation. It was published from April 1942 to Warsaw Uprising in August 1944. 16 issues were published. It was the only Polish underground publication, dedicated to cultural matters, that was regularly published for such a long period of time.

Editors-in-chief:

1. Bronisław Onufry Kopczyński (ps. "Stefan Barwiński") – arrested in January 1943, died in April that year
2. Wacław Bojarski (ps. "Jan Marzec", "Wojciech Wierzejewski", "Marek Zalewski") - wounded in May 1943, died in June that year
3. Andrzej Trzebiński (ps. "Stanisław Łomień", "Paweł Późny") - Arrested and executed in October 1943
4. Tadeusz Gajcy (ps. "Karol Topornicki", "Roman Oścień") - till the last issue, died in the Warsaw Uprising

Most of activists of SiN were related to the underground Warsaw University. Notable writers publishing in SiN included: Bernard Wojciech Mencl, Zdzisław Leon Stroiński, Stanisław Marczak-Oborski, Jerzy Zagórski and Lesław Marian Bartelski.

The magazine supported the radical and national philosophies, and was critical of some pre-war trends; in particular, it criticized the Skamander group of Polish writers.
