= Andrzej Trzebiński =

Polish poet, essayist, and playwright

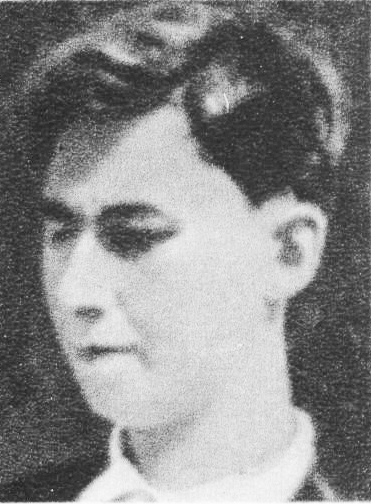
- Born: January 27, 1922
- Died: November 12, 1943 (aged 21)
- Occupations: poet, publicist
- Writing career
- Period: 1942–1943
- Notable work: Aby podnieść różę; Kwiaty z drzew zakazanych

Andrzej Trzebiński (1922 – 1943) was a Polish poet, essayist, and playwright.

During the German occupation of Poland, Trzebiński studied at the secret University of Warsaw. He was also editor of the right-wing cultural magazine Sztuka i Naród (Art and Nation) He was arrested by the Nazis and executed in Warsaw on November 12, 1943.

== Biography ==
=== Early life ===
Andrzej Trzebiński was born on January 27, 1922, in Radgoszcz near Łomża, into a family of noble origin. His father, Stanisław, was an estate manager. The family of his mother, Irena née Lasocka, was dispossessed by the Bolsheviks and expelled from Volhynia. Both parent took part in the Polish-Bolshevic War. Due to his father’s profession, the family often moved, eventually settling in Komierowo, where his father took the position of estate manager for Count Komierowski. There, young Trzebiński attended school and developed his literary, artistic, and athletic talents. In 1932, the family moved to Warsaw. In 1933, Andrzej began attending the Tadeusz Czacki State Gymnasium and Lyceum.

In 1937, while at the gymnasium, he began publishing in the school magazine edited by his teacher, Hiacynt Ratyński. A profound influence on Trzebiński was his encounter with Stanisław Adamczewski, who taught literature to the high school classes and was a recognized literary critic and theorist.

=== War and occupation ===
The German invasion of Poland and the swift defeat of the Polish army was a personal shock for the 17-year-old Trzebiński. In September, responding to the call of Colonel Roman Umiastowski, he left Warsaw and set out eastward in order to join the army. After the capitulation of the city, and without any contact with his father, he returned to Warsaw. There, he discovered that the tenement house where they had lived had completely burned down, and that the Germans had confiscated his father’s transport business. The family was reunited in October, living for a time with relatives; Andrzej, together with his mother, earned a living by scrubbing floors. In December, they moved to an apartment on Klonowa Street, where they lived until the spring of 1942.

Trzebiński attended underground classes, which often took place in the Trzebiński family’s apartment. He received his secondary school diploma in 1940. During this period, he continued his friendship with Tadeusz Borowski, with whom he shared literary ambitions; the two competed, writing almost in a race against one another. Both of them began underground university studies in Polish philology. During his studies, Trzebiński met Wacław Bojarski, who drew him into the radically nationalist circles of the Confederation of the Nation and introduced him to the publication of the literary journal associated with that organization, Art and Nation (Sztuka i Naród). Its first issue appeared in March 1942. Trzebiński joined the Confederation of the Nation in three months later. For Borowski, this was incomprehensible, and it led to many quarrels between them. Nevertheless, they did not break off their friendship, as both belonged to the "Club of Essencialists." The arrest and deportation of Borowski to Auschwitz was a shock for Trzebiński. He donated part of his scholarship from the Government Delegation for Poland to parcels for his friend. He also organized an evening devoted to Borowski’s poetry on July 20, 1943.

=== Death ===
At the end of October or the beginning of November 1943, Trzebiński was accidentally arrested by the Gestapo and put into Pawiak prison. He was eating at a workers’ canteen in the Ochota district that belonged to a factory where he was not employed. During an inspection, the Germans discovered that he was using false documents under the name Andrzej Jarociński – the house whose address was written in his identity card had not existed since 1939. His name appeared on a poster dated November 10 as a person sentenced but "intended for pardon." Nevertheless, on November 12 he was executed together with 30 other Pawiak prisoners in a public execution at 49 Nowy Świat Street. It was meant as retaliation for the death sentences carried out two days earlier by the Polish underground on Germans and collaborators.

This is how Tadeusz Borowski described his death in the short story Portrait of a Friend: "The condemned, as they were being executed, shouted anti-German slogans and cries in the name of freedom. In the Pawiak courtyard, to save costs, their clothes were taken off and paper shirts were put on their naked bodies. They were given injections so that they would not struggle in their bonds. At the public execution this did not look aesthetic. And his mouth, the mouth of a poet, was filled with plaster, and he was murdered in broad daylight, on the main artery of the capital, before the eyes of passers-by gathered in the gateways".

== Bibliography ==
- Janicka, Elżbieta (2006). Sztuka czy naród? Monografia pisarska Andrzeja Trzebińskiego [Art or the Nation? On Andrzej Trzebiński’s Literary Output] (PDF) (in Polish). Warsaw.
