= Wacław Bojarski =

Polish poet (1921–1943)

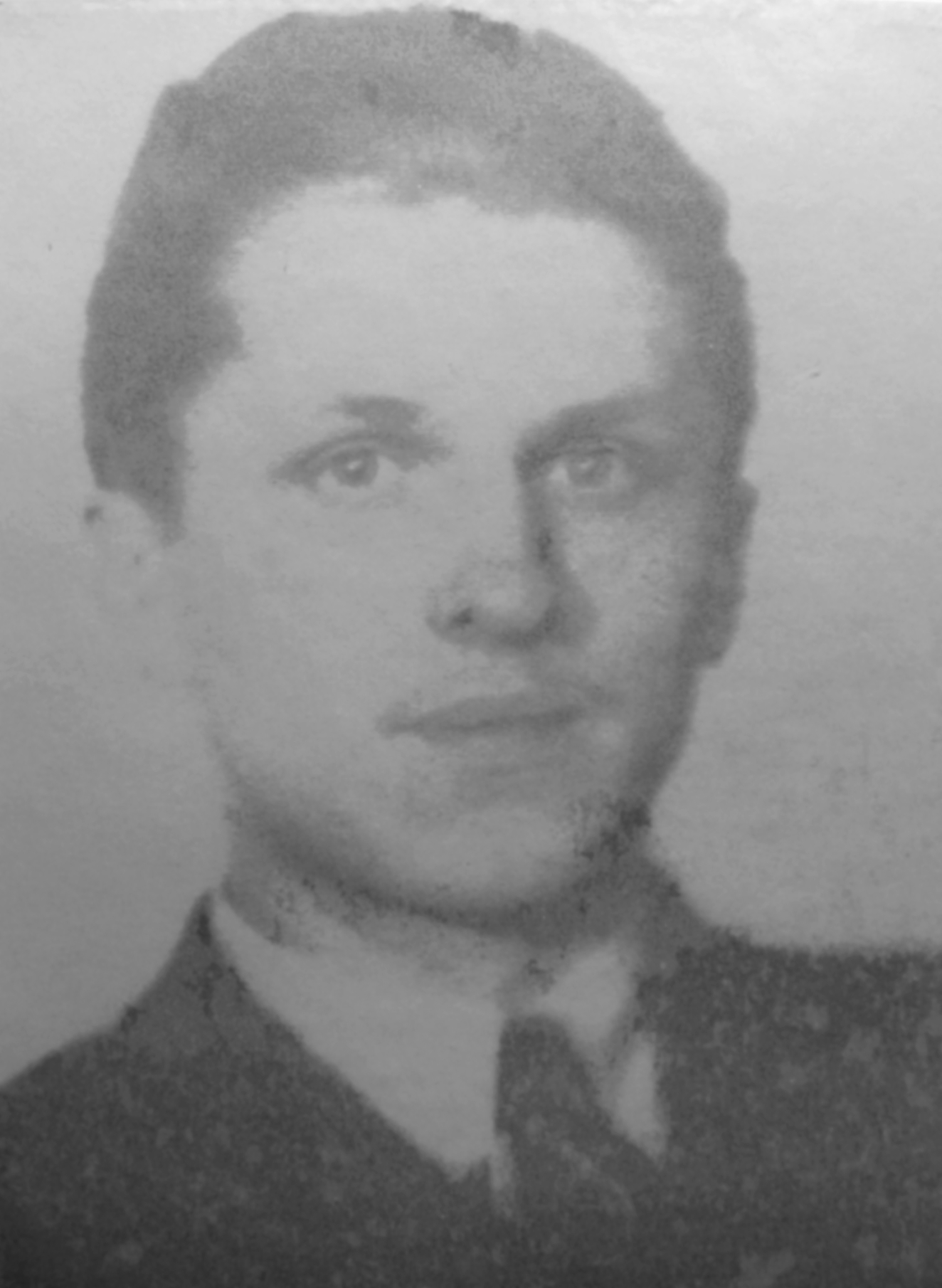

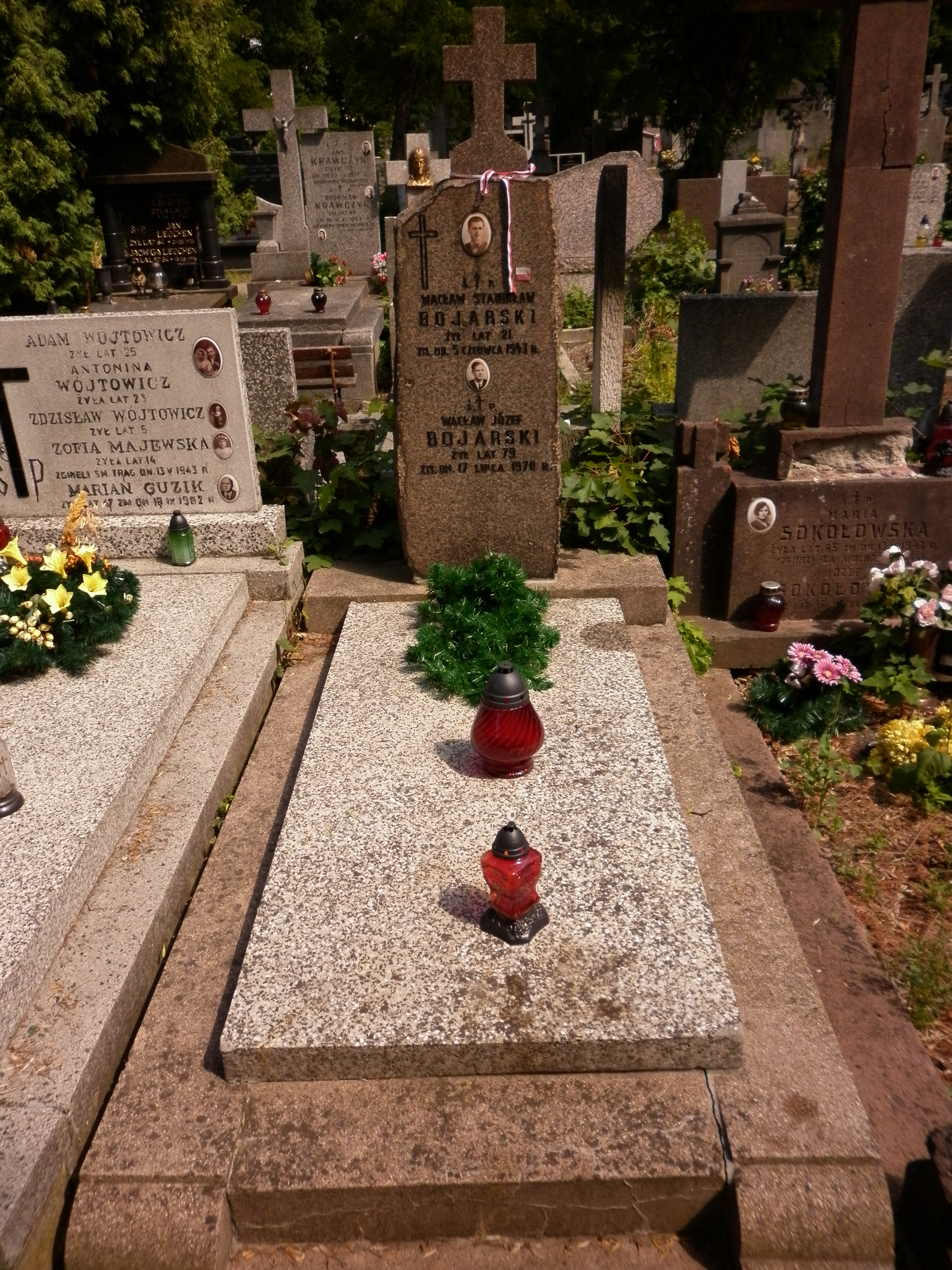
Wacław Bojarski grave in bródno

Wacław Bojarski, pseudonym "Czarnota" (30 October 1921 – 5 June 1943) was a Polish poet belonging to the Generation of Columbuses and the Confederation of the Nation underground organizations. During the Second World War he studied in the Warsaw underground university. He was the editor in chief of the monthly magazine Sztuka i Naród (Art and Nation).

Bojarski died on 5 June 1943 whilst suffering from wounds from the day's earlier fight with German forces.
