= Konstanty Maria Sopoćko =

Polish artist

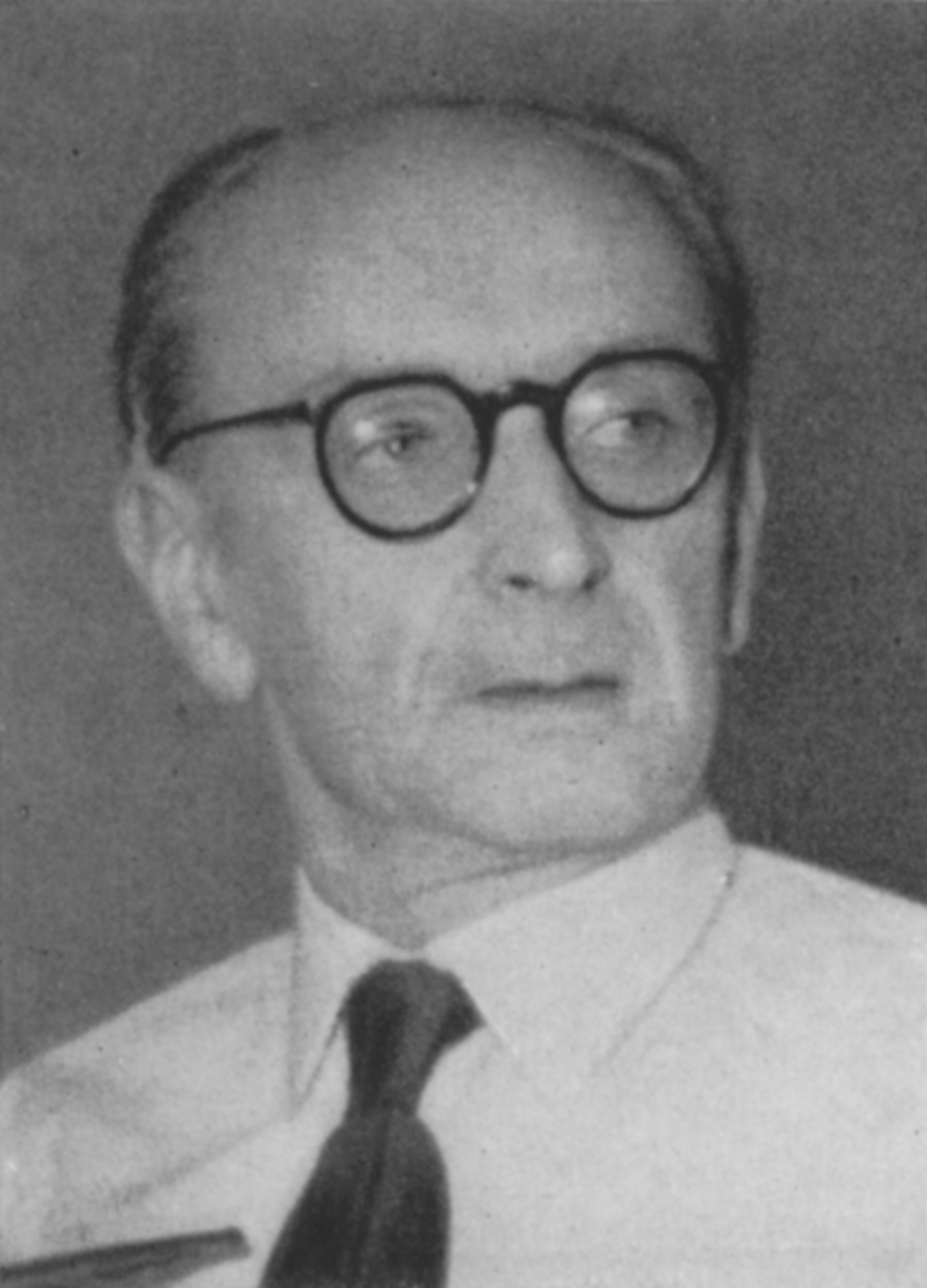
Konstanty Sopoćko (before 1965)

Konstanty Maria Sopoćko (1903-1992) was a Polish artist, specializing in woodcutting. He created posters, advertisements, logos, bookplates and illustrations. He lectured at the Academy of Fine Arts in Warsaw.
