= Włodzimierz Pietrzak =

Polish poet and literary critic

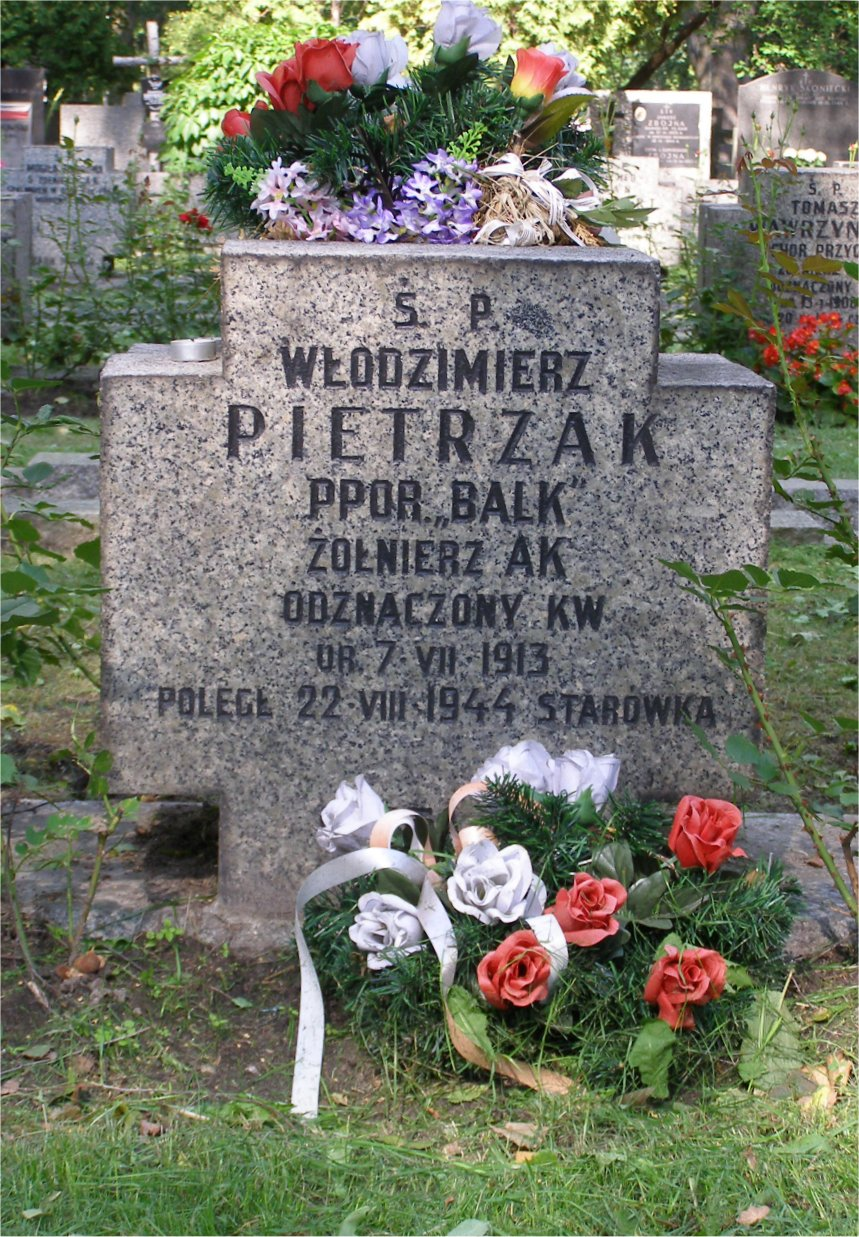
- Pietrzak's grave at Powązki Military Cemetery
- Born: July 7, 1913; Poland
- Died: August 22, 1944 (aged 31); Warsaw, Poland
- Occupations: Poet, literary critic

Włodzimierz Pietrzak (Polish pronunciation: [vwɔˈd͡ʑimjɛʂ ˈpjɛtʂak]; 7 July 1913 – 22 August 1944) was a Polish poet and literary critic. He was active in the underground cultural life in occupied Poland, editing underground magazines. He took part and died in the Warsaw Uprising.

A literary award of PAX Association was named after him.
