= List of Polish-language poets =

List of poets who have written much of their poetry in Polish. See also Discussion Page for additional poets not listed here.

Three 19th-century poets have historically been recognized as the national poets of Polish Romantic literature, dubbed the Three Bards. There have been five Polish-language Nobel Prize in Literature laureates, of which Czesław Miłosz and Wisława Szymborska were poets.

== A ==
- Franciszka Arnsztajnowa (1865–1942)
- Adam Asnyk (1838–1897)

== B ==
- Krzysztof Kamil Baczyński (1921–1944)
- Józef Baka (1707–1780)
- Edward Balcerzan (born 1937)
- Stanisław Baliński (1899–1984)
- Marcin Baran (born 1963)
- Stanisław Barańczak (1946–2014), Nike Award winner
- Aleksander Baumgardten (1908–1980)
- Miron Białoszewski (1922–1983)
- Zbigniew Bieńkowski (1913–1994)
- Biernat of Lublin (1465?– after 1529)
- Tadeusz Borowski (1922–1951)
- Tadeusz Boy-Żeleński (1874–1941)
- Władysław Broniewski (1897–1962)
- Andrzej Braun (1923–2008)
- Jerzy Braun (1907–1975)
- Ernest Bryll (1935–2024)
- Jan Brzechwa (1898–1966)
- Teodor Bujnicki (1904–1944)
- Andrzej Bursa (1932–1957)

== C ==
- Józef Czechowicz (1903–1939)
- Stanisław Czycz (1929–1996)
- Tytus Czyżewski (1880–1945)

== D ==
- Jacek Dehnel (born 1980)
- Elżbieta Drużbacka (1695 or 1698 – 1765)

== E ==
- Leszek Engelking (1955–2022)

== F ==
- Jerzy Ficowski (1924–2006)
- Kornel Filipowicz (1913–1990)
- Aleksander Fredro (1793–1876)

== G ==
- Tadeusz Gajcy (1922–1944)
- Konstanty Ildefons Gałczyński (1905–1953)
- Stefan Garczyński (1690–1756)
- Cezary Geroń (1960–1998)
- Zuzanna Ginczanka (1917–1944)
- Cyprian Godebski (1765–1809)
- Wiktor Gomulicki (1848–1919)
- Stanisław Grochowiak (1934–1976)
- Karol Gwóźdź (born 1987)
- Wioletta Grzegorzewska (born 1974)

== H ==
- Jerzy Harasymowicz (1933–1999)
- Julia Hartwig (1921–2017)
- Marian Hemar (1901–1972)
- Zbigniew Herbert (1924–1998), one of the best known and the most translated post-war Polish writers
- Tadeusz Hollender (1910–1943)
- Urszula Honek (born 1987)
- Witold Hulewicz (1895–1941)

== I ==
- Maria Ilnicka (1825 or 1827–1897)
- Kazimiera Iłłakowiczówna (1892–1983)
- Wacław Iwaniuk (1912–2001)
- Jarosław Iwaszkiewicz (1894–1980)

== J ==
- Stanisław Kalina Jaglarz (born 1991)
- Klemens Janicki (1516–1543)
- Jerzy Jarniewicz (born 1958)
- Bruno Jasieński (1901–1938)
- Jakub Jasiński (1761–1794)
- Mieczysław Jastrun (1903–1983)

== K ==
- Anna Kamieńska (1920–1986)
- Jaś Kapela (born 1984)
- Franciszek Karpiński (1741–1825)
- Jan Kasprowicz (1860–1936)
- Maria Kazecka (1880–1938)
- Andrzej Tadeusz Kijowski (born 1954)
- Franciszek Dionizy Kniaźnin (1750–1807)
- Jan Kochanowski (1530–1584), considered the "father of Polish poetry" and the greatest Slavic poet prior to the 19th century
- Halina Konopacka (1900–1989)
- Maria Konopnicka (1842–1910)
- Stanisław Korab-Brzozowski, (1876–1901)
- Jakub Kornhauser (born 1984)
- Julian Kornhauser (born 1946)
- Apollo Korzeniowski (1820–1869), father of Polish-British novelist Joseph Conrad
- Urszula Kozioł (1931–2025)
- Ignacy Krasicki (1735–1801)
- Zygmunt Krasiński (1812–1859), one of the Three Bards of Polish literature
- Katarzyna Krenz (born 1953)
- Józef Krupiński (1930–1998)
- Ryszard Krynicki (born 1943)
- Andrzej Krzycki (1482–1537)
- Paweł Kubisz (1907–1968)
- Jalu Kurek (1904–1983)
- Mira Kuś (born 1958)

== L ==
- Antoni Lange (1863–1929)
- Lâm Quang Mỹ (1944–2023)
- Małgorzata Lebda (born 1985)
- Stanisław Jerzy Lec, (1909–1966)
- Joanna Lech (born 1984)
- Jan Lechoń (1899–1956)
- Krystyna Lenkowska (born 1957)
- Bolesław Leśmian (1877–1937)
- Jerzy Liebert (1904–1931)
- Ewa Lipska (born 1945)
- Jarosław Lipszyc (born 1975)
- Stanisław Herakliusz Lubomirski (1641–1702)

== Ł ==
- Henryka Łazowertówna (1909–1942)
- Józef Łobodowski (1909–1988)
- Nasim Łuczaj

== M ==
- Bronisław Maj (born 1953)
- Antoni Malczewski (1793–1826)
- Marcin Malek (born 1975)
- Andrzej Mandalian (1926–2011)
- Jakobe Mansztajn (born 1982)
- Filip Matwiejczuk (born 1996)
- Tadeusz Miciński (1873–1918)
- Adam Mickiewicz (1798–1855), considered Poland's national poet and a leading figure of European romanticism
- Piotr Mierzwa (born 1980)
- Grażyna Miller (1957–2009)
- Czesław Miłosz (1911–2004), Nobel Prize in Literature
- Stanisław Młodożeniec (1895–1959)
- Jan Andrzej Morsztyn (1621–1693)
- Zbigniew Morsztyn (1628–1689)

== N ==
- Daniel Naborowski (1573–1640)
- Adam Naruszewicz (1733–1796)
- Julian Ursyn Niemcewicz (1758–1841)
- Cyprian Kamil Norwid (1821–1883)
- Bronka Nowicka (born 1974)
- Franciszek Nowicki (1864–1935)

== O ==
- Antoni Edward Odyniec (1804–1885)
- Artur Oppman (1867–1931)
- Władysław Orkan (1875–1930)
- Agnieszka Osiecka (1936–1997)

== P ==
- Leon Pasternak (1910–1969)
- Maria Pawlikowska-Jasnorzewska (1891–1945)
- Jacek Podsiadło (born 1964)
- Wincenty Pol (1807–1872)
- Halina Poświatowska (1935–1967)
- Wacław Potocki (1621–1696)
- Kazimierz Przerwa-Tetmajer a.k.a. Kazimierz Tetmajer (1865–1940)
- Zenon Przesmycki (1861–1944)
- Jeremi Przybora (1915–2004)

== R ==
- Mikołaj Rej (1505–1569)
- Sydor Rey (1908–1979)
- Barbara Rosiek (1959–2020)
- Tadeusz Różewicz (1921–2014), Nike Award winner
- Tomasz Różycki (born 1970)
- Zyta Rudzka (born 1964)
- Zygmunt Rumel (1915–1943)
- Robert Rybicki (born 1976)
- Lucjan Rydel (1870–1918)
- Jarosław Marek Rymkiewicz (1935–2022), Nike Award winner

== S ==
- Maciej Kazimierz Sarbiewski (1595–1640)
- Władysław Sebyła (1902–1940)
- Mikołaj Sęp Szarzyński (1550–1581)
- Jan Stanisław Skorupski (born 1938)
- Antoni Słonimski (1895–1976)
- Juliusz Słowacki (1809–1849), regarded as of the Three Bards of Polish literature
- Michał Sobol (born 1970)
- Stanisław Stabro (born 1948)
- Edward Stachura (1937–1979)
- Leopold Staff (1878–1957)
- Anna Stanisławska (1651–1701)
- Andrzej Stasiuk (born 1960)
- Anatol Stern (1899–1968)
- Przemysław Suchanecki
- Marcin Świetlicki (born 1961)
- Anna Świrszczyńska (1909–1984)
- Władysław Syrokomla (1823–1862)
- Lola Szereszewska (1895–1943)
- Władysław Szlengel (1912–1943)
- Janusz Szpotański (1929–2001)
- Janusz Szuber (1947–2020)
- Włodzimierz Szymanowicz (1946–1967)
- Wisława Szymborska (1923–2012), Nobel Prize in Literature
- Szymon Szymonowic (1558–1629)

== Ś ==
- Tadeusz Śliwiak (1928–1994)
- Marcin Świetlicki (born 1961)

== T ==
- Ignacy Tański (1761–1805)
- Eugeniusz Tkaczyszyn-Dycki (born 1962), Nike Award winner
- Julian Tuwim (1894–1953)
- Jan Twardowski (1915–2006)

== U ==
- Kornel Ujejski (1823–1897)

== W ==
- Aleksander Wat (1900–1967)
- Adam Ważyk (1905–1982)
- Adam Wiedemann (born 1967)
- Kazimierz Wierzyński (1894–1969)
- Witold Wirpsza (1918–1985)
- Stanisław Ignacy Witkiewicz a.k.a. "Witkacy" (1885–1939)
- Stefan Witwicki (1801–1847)
- Rafał Wojaczek (1945–1971)
- Grażyna Wojcieszko (born 1957)
- Maryla Wolska (1873–1930)
- Wiktor Woroszylski (1927–1996)
- Piotr Odmieniec Włast (1876–1949)
- Józef Wybicki (1747–1822), author of the National Anthem of Poland
- Stanisław Wyspiański (1869–1907)

== Z ==
- Tymon Zaborowski (1799–1828)
- Bohdan Zadura (born 1945)
- Adam Zagajewski (1945–2021)
- Józef Bohdan Zaleski (1802–1886)
- Wacław Michał Zaleski (1799–1849)
- Kazimiera Zawistowska (1870–1902)
- Piotr Zbylitowski (1569–1649)
- Emil Zegadłowicz (1888–1941)
- Katarzyna Ewa Zdanowicz-Cyganiak (born 1979)

== Ż ==
- Narcyza Żmichowska (1819–1876), a precursor of feminism in Poland
- Agnieszka Żuchowska-Arendt (born 1983)
- Jerzy Żuławski (1874–1915)
- Juliusz Żuławski (1910–1999)
- Eugeniusz Żytomirski (1911–1975)

== See also ==
- List of Polish-language authors
- List of Poles
