= Szpilki =

Polish satirical magazine

- Cover of Szpilki from the 1980s, illustrated by cartoonist Szczepan Sadurski.
- Former editors: Stanisław Jerzy Lec, Leon Pasternak, Jerzy Zaruba
- Categories: Satire
- Format: Magazine
- Founder: Eryk Lipiński
- Founded: 1936
- Final issue: 1994
- Country: Poland
- Based in: Three Crosses Square, Warsaw

Masthead for Szpilki satirical weekly magazine

Szpilki (Polish pronunciation: [ˈʂpil.ki], lit. 'Pins') was a Polish satirical magazine. It was established in 1936 by a group of lettered leftists, including Eryk Lipiński, Zenon Wasilewski, and Zbigniew Mitzner (chief editor).

Its motto was Prawdziwa cnota krytyk się nie boi (True virtue is not afraid of criticism), a quote from Ignacy Krasicki's mock-heroic poem Monachomachia, or War of Monks.

Suspended during World War II, it was resumed in 1945. In 1953 Szpilki was merged with another satirical magazine, Mucha.

Together with many other printed media, it was suspended during the period of martial law. From 1990 the magazine experienced difficulties, and after several attempts of reactivation it was closed in 1994.
