= Tadeusz Gajcy =

Polish poet, playwright and soldier

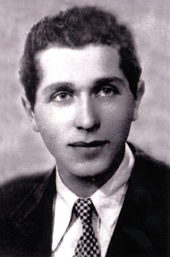
- Born: 8 February 1922; Warsaw, Poland
- Died: 16 August 1944 (aged 22); Warsaw, Poland
- Other names: Karol Topornicki; Roman Oścień; Topór; Orczyk
- Occupations: Poet, soldier

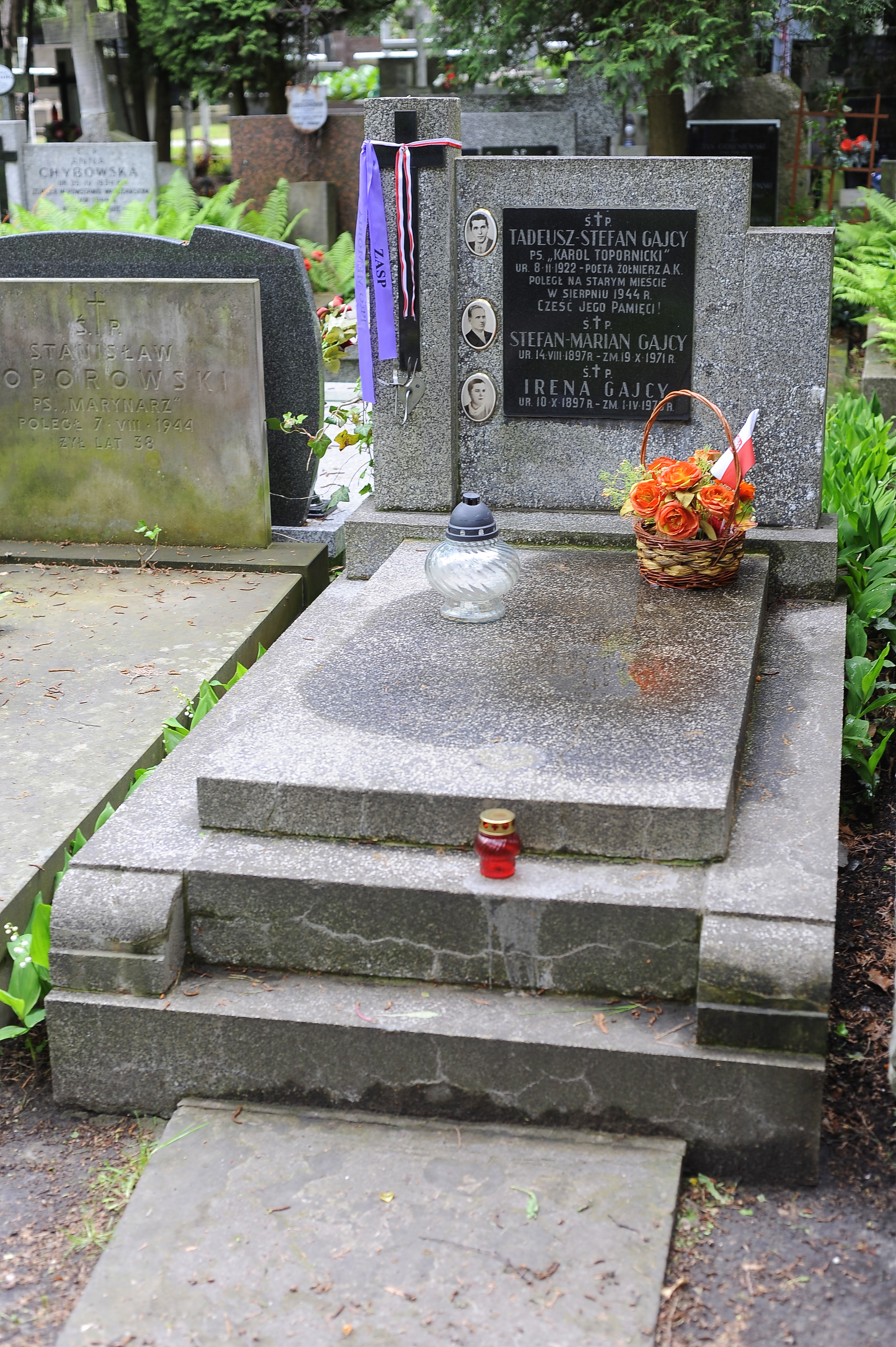
Grave of Gajcy at Powązki Military Cemetery

Tadeusz Stefan Gajcy (Polish pronunciation: [taˈdɛ.uʐ ˈɡajt͡sɨ]; 8 February 1922 – 16 August 1944) was a Polish poet, playwright, editor-in-chief of the Sztuka i Naród (Art and Nation) periodical, member of the Confederation of the Nation, soldier of the Home Army.

== Biography ==
He was born on 8 February 1922 on Dzika Street in Warsaw. His ancestors on his father's side came to Poland from Hungary, which is why several forms of the poet's polonized family name exist in documents (Gajc, Gajca, Gaycy, Gajczy). Tadeusz's parents were Stefan Gajcy and Irena Gajcy, née Zmarzlik. Gajcy's father was a telegraphist during the Polish-Bolshevik war and after the war, he worked as a locksmith in the Railway Repair Plant in Warsaw's Praga district. His mother was a midwife in a hospital and had roots in the landed gentry. In her free time, she carried out social and charitable activities, which won her respect and recognition both at work and among the local population. His mother's brother Stanislaw Zmarzlik was a very talented dancer who achieved artistic success in Western Europe and the USA under the stage name Stanley Barry. Tadeusz also had a younger brother called Mieczysław. They grew up in a classical multigenerational family as his mother's parents also lived at home.

He discovered his talent for poetry already as a child, and he tied his future to poetry. He attended primary school in Stawki Street, at the same time serving as an altar boy in the Church of St. John of God. He finished school with a good result, with the best marks in the humanities and the weakest in mathematics. He then attempted an exam at Tadeusz Czacki Grammar and Secondary School. Despite a sufficient grade, he was not admitted to this school due to a lack of places. Eventually, he became a pupil of the Marian Fathers' Middle and High School in Bielany. The Marian Fathers' School was famous for its rigorousness and for placing a great emphasis on the patriotic and pro-social education of young people. Some of the teaching staff made no secret of their National Democracy views. For this reason, despite the official dissociation of the Marian Fathers from politics, the school was a very popular place of education for young people influenced by the national movement. After the outbreak of the war, the Marian Center in Bielany was the main point of support for the Konfederacja Narodu's [Confederate of Nation] activity in Warsaw.

During the following years of his secondary school education, he achieved increasingly better marks, especially in the humanities. In the fourth grade, next to Wojciech Jaruzelski, Tadeusz was the best student in the Polish language. In June 1939, after passing the so-called Little Baccalaureate, he was admitted to the humanities department of the High School. During this period, he began to write poems, which the author considered worthy of permanent preservation. His works from this period, as Andrzej Tauber-Ziółkowski underlines, were unusually serious, mature and philosophical for the age of sixteen. In the summer of 1939, Gajcy submitted several poems to the editors of Prosto z mostu (Straight from the Bridge), the most widely read socio-cultural weekly at the end of the interwar period. The editor, Stanisław Piasecki, promised to publish them in autumn in a special insert containing debut poems of teenage "verse-poets". Before others, Gajcy had read the classics of world literature: the works of Joseph Conrad, Franz Kafka, Knut Hamsun, Anton Chekhov, Jarosław Haszek and Fyodor Dostoyevsky. Above all, however, he was interested in contemporary poetry, created by Żagarists and Jerzy Liebert, Konstanty Ildefons Gałczyński, Władysław Sebyła, Wojciech Bąk, Czesław Miłosz, Józef Czechowicz and Józef Łobodowski.

On the day the war broke out, he was supposed to start learning in the first year of secondary school, but instead, as a member of the school's Military Training Troop, he reported to the military authorities with a request to be drafted into the fighting army. Having received a refusal, and in accordance with a radio announcement by Colonel Roman Umiatowski appealing to men capable of carrying weapons to march East, he left Warsaw. He reached Włodawa on the Bug river. He returned to Warsaw after the capitulation of the capital. He decided to return to education, but unfortunately the teaching staff of the Marian Fathers were temporarily arrested, and then the German authorities decided to teach Poles only at the elementary and vocational school level. Gajcy therefore began his education in secret classes. During his studies, he avoided German repression thanks to resistance cells that intercepted a letter written by his friend from the secret classes denouncing them to the Gestapo. During this period, Gajcy was mostly preoccupied with studying the history of literature. Professor Edmund Jankowski, a post-war researcher at the Institute of Literary Research of the Polish Academy of Sciences, prepared him for his maturity exam. The professor remembered him as an arrogant, self-confident and nonchalant young man, but at the same time extremely talented and intelligent. Gajcy wanted his matriculation exam to be a ticket to underground studies in Polish philology at the University of Warsaw. In the meantime, he diligently studied German and began translating classical works from this language. Experts comparing analogous translations of works translated by Czesław Miłosz or Marian Hemar emphasized the superiority of Gajcy. He passed his maturity exam in the spring of 1941. Admitted to the Polish Studies at the University of Warsaw, he drew his knowledge from the most eminent Polish humanists: Julian Krzyżanowski, Władysław Tatarkiewicz or Zofia Szmydtowa. In the opinion of the academic staff, he was a diligent student.

Parallel to his studies, Gajcy also sought contact with the underground press, in the pages of which he wanted to publish his works. Eventually, he succumbed to the charisma and personality of Wacław Bojarski, editor-in-chief of the SiN periodical, with whom Władysław Bartoszewski had introduced him. The KN set up SiN in order to have a broad influence on academic and literary circles. The organisation of the magazine was a joint work of Włodzimierz Pietrzak, head of the propaganda and political department of the KN, and Onufry Bronisław Kopczyński, a poet and composer, who became the first editor of SiN. The magazine's editorial board included eminent artists of the younger generation, both ideologically linked to the KN and those mentioned above: Kopiczyński, Pietrzak and Zdzisław Stroiński, Wojciech Mencel, Tadeusz Sołtan, Stanisław Marczak-Oborski, Lesław Bartelski. Young people from elite homes, whose parents often represented completely different political views, e.g. Leszek Kostek-Biernacki was the son of Waclaw Kostka Biernacki, joined the KN.

After joining the organisational structures, Gajcy took an active part in secret literary meetings, where readings and discussions were held and even theatre performances were staged. The meetings were attended by young people across ideological divides. Around 1942, he took up the post of a reporter in a newspaper published by the KN Nowa Polska-Wiadomości Codzienne (New Poland – Daily News). His first piece was published in combined issues 3-4 dated VIII-IX 1942. In 1943, starting from issue no. 6, the number of his texts in SiN increased significantly. At the same time, he wrote for other magazines: such as Kultura Jutra (Culture of Tomorrow), Prawda Młodych (Truth of theYouth), Dźwigary (Levers), and Biuletyn Informacyjny (News Bulletin).

In October 1942 the Information Bulletin of the KN announced a competition for a soldier's march, which Gajcy won with his song Uderzenie [Strike], to which Jan Ekier wrote the music. In his subsequent texts published in SiN, Gajcy criticised the milieu of the Skamander group for its disrespectful attitude towards the state and national alienation: "Skamander, if it spoke about the state, spoke rhetorically or mockingly (Tuwim's poems about the state), but one can find in this mocking, perverse tone the quiet tragedy of people who had learned to 'be Poles'.(...) As an elite they were criticised for leaving the nation to its fate at a time of war disaster looming over Poland.

He did not stop with the publication of literary and critical works and at the same time got involved in editorial work and the distribution of the magazine. He soon became friends with his organisational colleague Zdzisław Stroiński, who owed him the promotion of his own literary work. In the article Sztuka a państwo [Art and the State] co-written with Bojarski, the authors analysed the place and role of art in states which, according to them, had the features of a strong or weak state. They criticised the Polish state from the period before the Sanation government, which they considered to be ideology-free.

The propaganda action in which Gajcy participated with Bojarski and Stroiński ended tragically. On 25 May 1943, on the 400th anniversary of the death of Nicolaus Copernicus, they laid a wreath at his monument in Warsaw. The sash of the wreath was decorated with the inscription: "To the Genius of the Slavs - Compatriots". The action was intended to remind the occupying forces that, contrary to the German nationality attributed to Copernicus, he was a Pole and a Slav. The photographic material from the action was to be sent to London and then used for propaganda purposes. The photographers were surprised by so called Blue Policeman, Gajcy reacted nervously, as a result of which Bojarski was shot and died ten days later, while Stroiński was arrested, beaten up and sent to the Pawiak prison. After the death of his colleague, for which he made himself responsible, Gajcy fell into depression. However, Bojarski himself was to be blamed for the failure of the action, as he was its originator and its fatal executor. Although Gajcy understood the need to differentiate between being an artist and being a soldier, just like the entire SiN and KN milieu, he sought a place for himself as a militarised poet, disciplined, mentally strong, and brave, the one who influences not only through his artistic work, but at the same time is ready to lead a unit into battle, which is doomed to failure in advance, but is in line with the ideal of commitment and combat.

Gajcy associated himself ideologically with the political message of the KN and its philosophy based on the idea of universalism, building the Slavic Empire under Polish leadership on the ruins of the two occupying powers, criticising democracy, as well as the pre-war Sanation rule. However, as editor of SiN, he himself placed much less emphasis on ideological accents in the magazine than his predecessors. A critical attitude to the culture of the inter-war period was contained in his sketch Już nie potrzebujemy ["We do not need it any more"] and the essay O wawrzyn ["For the laurel"]. In the article Historia i czyn [History and Action], he shared with his readers his observations on the destructive influence of war on culture. The famous poem Wczorajszemu [To the Yesterday’s] became a prologue to Gajcy's wartime poetic work, which was inspired by the work of Władysław Sebyla, poet, soldier of September 1939, murdered by the NKVD in Kharkov. For this poem in 1942 Gajcy received a prize in the SiN competition announced in June 1942. In October 1943 he published his drama Misterium niedzielne [Sunday Mystery], which contained elements of grotesque and satire. Through it, Gajcy criticized the lack of realism among the inhabitants of the capital and the ease with which people became followers of utopian ideas. He criticized Polish vices, the Sanation delusion of military power and the Polish Navy-Blue Police.

After the death of Trzebiński, the third editor-in-chief of SiN, despite the suggestions of his surroundings, he decided to direct the magazine. He realised the scale of the threat but believed that the sacrifices of his deceased colleagues cannot be wasted. He also continued to work within the Cultural Movement established by Trzebiński. In order to increase the scope of the Movement's influence, he held talks with Krzysztof Kamil Baczyński with a view to recruiting him into the organisation's structures. It was difficult for Gajcy to keep up with the pace of work of his predecessors, as he was first and foremost a poet, and not a theoretician like them, which is why the magazine under his leadership departed from political journalism in favour of content of typically artistic value. He strengthened cooperation with literary circles associated with the magazines: Dźwigary [Levers], Droga [Way], and established contact with the underground literary circles from Kraków. He managed to widen the circle of publicists and improve the visual quality of the magazine.

As emphasized by the literary critic Jan Marx, among the "sacrificial national-messianic romanticism" created by the SiN circle, it is most fully expressed by Gajcy, who, with the passage of time and the approaching victory of the Allies in the war, visionarily perceived that for Poland the end of the war with Germany would not be the end of its drama. That is why in his catastrophic poetic visions, he hints at the search for his own death as a sacrifice in the face of the hopelessness of the situation. Like Trzebiński and Bojarski, he criticised the literary output of the interwar period, writing: "The eclecticism and timidity of the infantile literary twentieth century is to become for us a history that teaches and warns us". Like the entire SiN milieu, Gajcy expected a creative output engaged in the current problems of the nation, a creative output capable of looking far ahead in terms of its needs and threats. In the poem Z dna [From the Bottom], which was most probably written in September 1941, he used motifs typical of the occupation poetry, with the use of patriotic and soldierly lyricism. The work contains references to both battle of Grunwald and the most heroic battles of September 1939, as well as to Romuald Traugutt, whose greatness was nurtured by a museum established by the Marian Fathers' school, which he attended. In turn, the poem Widma [Spectres] contains very strongly accented references to the Old and New Testaments. In an apocalyptic and visionary way Gajcy described the destruction of Warsaw. The Skamander group of poets was criticized for infantilism and shallowness. As Jan Marx emphasizes,. of the whole circle only Gajcy was consistent in his criticism, because he was the only one who did not publish works that would bear the signs of infantilism and shallowness.

Following in the footsteps of his organisational colleagues, Gajcy assigned Polish culture a leading role in the whole of Central Europe. This leadership was to be based on the expansiveness, dynamism and totality of Polish culture, which was to emanate into all significant areas of the nation's collective life. Once established in its own nation, it was to begin expanding into neighbouring nations. In order to achieve this, extensive staff structures were needed, which is why already during the war the activists of SiN conducted classes introducing the culture and language of neighbouring nations (the Czech Republic, Ukraine).

In the spring of 1944, overwhelmed by the number of duties, he decided to quit his studies, which he claimed to have been disappointed with, so he preferred to devote his time to organizational activities. Shortly before the outbreak of the Warsaw Uprising, he received a task to support the structures of the Home Army Information and Propaganda Bureau, so he took part in the Course for Military Press Reporters in the spring of 1944. Contrary to the guidelines, however, he decided to take part in front-line combat together with. Stroiński. Both poets wanted to enlist in Lieutenant "Ryszard's" assault group, but due to the fact that they only had a grenade and a pistol, the lieutenant initially refused to accept them. He changed his mind only after his unit had been decimated and he had to make up the shortfall. In the following days, they managed to acquire German uniforms and took part in supply operations. As time went by, however, Gajcy took part in fighting in the most dangerous sections against SS units. During the breaks in the fighting he recited his poems to the fighting insurgents.

His last poem was a commentary on the catastrophic explosion of a German booby-trapped tank on 13 August, which killed three hundred people. The macabre sight after the explosion inspired Gajcy to write a poem that was so shocking and macabre that it was not published until 1964. Two days later, in the evening, Stroiński and Gajcy went to an outpost in a passable tenement house at Przejazd 1/3 Street. During the night, German sappers reached the basement under the massive edifice and laid explosive charges. At noon the next day there was an explosion. The Germans, for the first time in the Uprising, used a coal dust attack called Typhoon. Its destructive force destroyed the tenement completely, burying both SiN men under the heaps of rubble on 16 August 1944. Gajcy was posthumously awarded the Cross of Valour. The poet's body was exhumed by his family in the spring of 1946, and only then was it finally established where he had fallen. He was buried in the insurgents' quarters in the military Powazki cemetery. In his work, Jarosław Iwaszkiewicz referred to the circumstances of Gajcy's and Stroiński's deaths, writing in the poem Niepogrzebani [The Unburied]: "Two poets rose like flares into the air".

Just after the war, Gajcy's drama Homer i Orchideja [Homer and the Orchid] was one of the three most frequently performed plays. Gradually, however, the attacks on the creators of SiN, for belonging to the KN, intensified. Paradoxically, this organisation, whose more than 700 members gave their lives in the fight against the Germans and the Soviets, was considered fascist by the literati serving the Stalinist authorities. Czesław Miłosz, who was in exile, also spoke critically about Gajcy's attitude during the war and wrote the following about the SiN milieu "I admit that I did not have the slightest sympathy for the magazine itself, the articles published there seemed to me pathetic and gibberish", and in the poem Ballada [Ballad] he wrote about Gajcy as the one who was "defending an unjust cause".

On 2 August 2009 the President of the Republic of Poland Lech Kaczyński posthumously awarded Gajcy with the Commander's Cross of the Order of Polonia Restituta for his outstanding contribution to the independence of the Republic of Poland, for his achievements in the development of Polish culture. In July 2009 a coin with the face value of 10 zloty made in silver with a gold-plated ring commemorating Gajcy was put into circulation.

== See also ==
- List of Polish-language poets

== Bibliography ==
- Maj, Bronisław (1992). Biały chłopiec. O poezji Tadeusza Gajcego. Kraków: Oficyna Literacka.
