= Zygmunt Rumel =

Polish poet

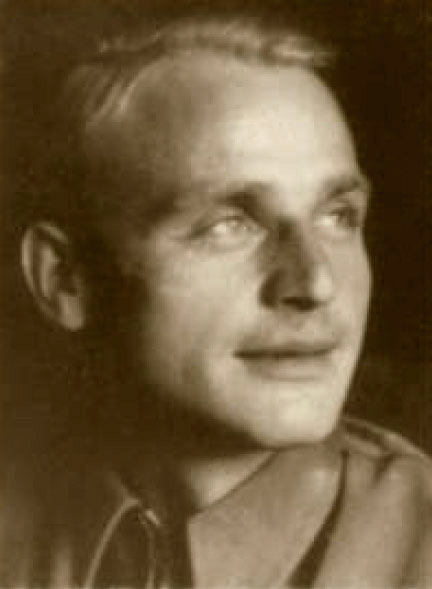
- Rumel, nom de guerre 'Mały', 'Krzysztof Poręba'
- Born: 22 February 1915; Petrograd, Russian Empire
- Died: 10 July 1943 (aged 28) †; Killed in action, former Wołyń Voivodeship

Zygmunt Jan Rumel (22 February 1915 – 10 July 1943) was a Polish poet and, during World War II, underground officer of the Bataliony Chłopskie partisans in the Volhynia Region of the Second Polish Republic. Rumel's poetic talent was acknowledged by renowned Polish poet Leopold Staff and dramatist Jarosław Iwaszkiewicz. One of his poems entitled "Dwie matki" (Two mothers) in which Rumel described his love of Poland and Ukraine, was published in a popular Płomyk magazine in 1935 (issue No. 28). He was killed by the Ukrainian Insurgent Army during the massacres of Poles in Volhynia in 1943.

== Life ==
Rumel, whose talent was often compared to the one of Krzysztof Kamil Baczyński, was born in Saint Petersburg during World War I, and grew up in Krzemieniec in the Wołyń Voivodeship province of the Second Polish Republic. The exact location of his birth has not been confirmed. He came from a military family, his father Władysław, an agricultural engineer, was also an officer of the Polish Army who fought in the Polish–Soviet War and was awarded the Cross of Virtuti Militari. Some time in the 1920s, the family settled in Volhynia as military osadniks.

The Rumels lived in the countryside near Krzemieniec, in a manor once belonging to the family of Juliusz Słowacki. His parents were avid readers and their son inherited it from them. At home, he read Polish classics of Słowacki and Adam Mickiewicz. Zygmunt graduated from a renowned Liceum Krzemienieckie and went to Warsaw to continue his education at the Warsaw University. Leopold Staff once said to his mother Janina (née Tyminska): Keep an eye on this boy, he will be a great poet one day.

While living in Warsaw, in the second half of the 1930s he was actively involved in social life of Volhynian Poles. Rumel was a member of Volhynian Association of Village Youth, and cooperated with People's University in the village of Rozyn, where he probably met senator Kazimierz Banach (pl). He was a publicist of the Droga Pracy magazine, writing about history and society. Rumel supported the idea of multinational Poland, and cooperated with a bilingual (Polish and Ukrainian) magazine Młoda Wieś – Molode Selo, which was published in Krzemieniec.

=== War years and death ===
In 1939, resulting from the joint invasion of Poland by Nazi Germany and Soviet Union, the province of Volhynia was incorporated into the Ukrainian SSR in the atmosphere of terror. Rumel, an artillery colonel, took part in the September 1939 campaign. Captured by the Red Army, he presented himself as a private, and was released. Two years later, in June 1941 eastern Poland was overrun by Nazi Germany during Operation Barbarossa. Rumel remained in Volhynia, where in late 1939 he joined Polish underground organization formed by activists of the peasant movement. In January 1940, Rumel and Pius Zalewski were sent to the General Government territory under the German occupation, to get in touch with former voivode of Volhynia, Henryk Jozewski. They failed to cross the border, and returned to Lutsk, where they were met by envoys of the Union of Armed Struggle (ZWZ), Tadeusz Majewski and Jerzy Potapow, who came to Volhynia to build the organization.

In February and March 1940 Rumel twice travelled from Volhynia to Warsaw, as a courier of the ZWZ. At the same time, the NKVD managed to destroy the organization in his native province, arresting, among others, Rumel's brother, Bronislaw (murdered by the Soviets in 1941). Zygmunt survived because he remained in Warsaw, where he married Anna (née Wojciszkiewicz), and together with another brother, Stanisław, ran a hardware store in the Ochota district. All the time he actively participated in the Polish resistance movement, his nom de guerre was Krzysztof Poręba. In the spring of 1943 he returned to his native Volhynia and became a commandant of the Bataliony Chłopskie's VIII District covering the area.

In early summer 1943, when the Ukrainian Insurgent Army (UPA), together with local Ukrainian nationalists, began a campaign of massacres of Polish civilians in Volhynia, Rumel, who spoke Ukrainian fluently, was assigned to get in touch with leaders of the UPA and start talks, which would bring an end to the massacres. The order was issued by Kazimierz Banach, chief of staff of the Bataliony Chłopskie and a delegate of the Polish government-in-exile in Volhynia.

On 7 July 1943, Rumel, together with officer Krzysztof Markiewicz (aka Czort), both dressed in military uniforms, aided by guide Witold Dobrowolski, contacted the Ukrainians. They were officially representing the Polish government. However, instead of peace talks, a different fate awaited them. Both were brutally tortured for three days. Then, on Saturday 10 July, Rumel was tied to four horses and his body ripped apart. Markiewicz and Dobrowolski were killed in the same manner in the village of Kustycze, near the Volhynian town of Turzyska. The next day, Sunday 11 July 1943, was the bloodiest day yet of the Volhynian massacres, when armed Ukrainians attacked Polish settlements and churches, killing thousands of people, including infants, women, and the elderly.

Jarosław Iwaszkiewicz, upon hearing of Rumel's death, wrote in his diary: "He was one of our diamonds, with which we shot at the enemy. This diamond could have shone..."

== Works ==
The First Rumel's poems were published in 1934 in a school bulletin. He kept most of his work to himself, and did not aspire to have them published. Manuscripts of his poems were kept by his wife, who was a nurse in the Warsaw Uprising and survived the war. The first publication of selected works of Rumel, edited by Anna Kamienska, was issued in 1975, and was highly praised by Jarosław Iwaszkiewicz who wrote: "Rumel had a mind and talent on an original scale".

According to Polish literary critic Bozena Gorska, Rumel's poetry was strongly influenced by the works of Juliusz Słowacki and Cyprian Kamil Norwid. He rarely drew inspiration from the works of Polish avant-garde poets, but in some of his poems influences of Leopold Staff and Boleslaw Lesmian can be found. Rumel felt close to the Volhynian folk culture, and frequently used Ukrainian and Russian words. He also wrote about Polish historical subjects, best exemplified in his poem "The Year 1863".

== Legacy ==
In 2004, Polish film director Wincenty Ronisz produced a documentary Poeta nieznany (Unknown poet), which describes the life and death of Rumel. Rumel is also the patron of several clubs of young Polish poets. However, he remains little known to the majority of Polish people. On 10 February 2011, a Public Library in Warsaw's borough of Praga-South was named after him. Also, there are streets named after him in Gdańsk and Legnica.

== See also ==
- Polish literature
- Polish culture during World War II
- List of Poles
- List of Polish-language poets
