= Krzysztof Markiewicz =

Polish underground resistance movement officer

Krzysztof Markiewicz nom de guerre Czort, was an officer of Polish underground resistance movement during World War II in the rank of podporucznik (Second Lieutenant) of the AK Okręg Wołyń cooperating with the Polish Bataliony Chłopskie partisans in the defence of Volhynia. He was brutally murdered as a peace envoy on 10 July 1943 by the Ukrainian Insurgent Army (UPA) during the massacres of Poles.

== Circumstances surrounding murder ==
The Polish peace envoy representing AK and BCh arrived on 7–8 July 1943 in the village of Kustycze. Sent without military escort by peace advocate Kazimierz Banach of the Government Delegation for Poland, the envoy included notable poet and BCh officer Zygmunt Rumel fluent in Polish and Ukrainian, Krzysztof Markiewicz from AK, and the horse carriage driver Witold Dobrowolski. They were met by warlord Jusif Stelmaszczuk – wrote Ratter – (Stelmaschuk; see Юрій Стельмащук, uk) who arrested them on the spot. After three days of extreme torture, they were executed on 10 July 1943 by having their limbs ripped apart by horses in a medieval style.

The public torture execution of Lieutenant Krzysztof Markiewicz in Kustycze near Turzysk occurred one day before the largest assault on the Polish civilian targets, launched at dusk on 11 July 1943 by the death squads of OUN-UPA aided by Ukrainian nationalists. In total, some 125 villages were attacked on that day across the counties of Horochów, Włodzimierz Wołyński and Kowel, with 10 more on 14–15 July, and 37 more on 16–18 July 1943.
