= Janusz Szpotański =

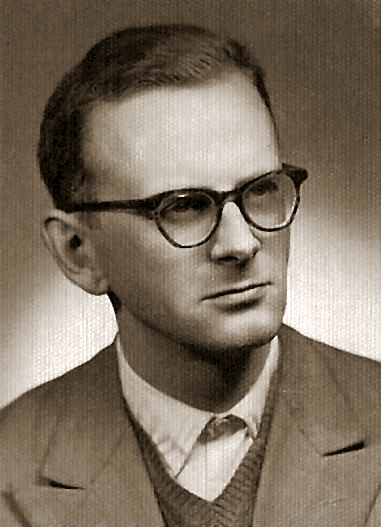
Janusz Szpotański

Janusz Szpotański, (pen names Władysław Gnomacki, Aleksander Oniegow; 12 January 1929 in Warsaw – 13 October 2001 in Warsaw), was a Polish poet, satirist, critic, translator, literary theorist and chess player (a three times chess champion of Warsaw, he also held a nationwide title of Master).

He was the creator of satirical tragi-comedic poems that ridiculed the communist government of Poland. These works were often written in an absurdist, grotesque style, and specifically lampooned prominent members of the Polish communist party, as well as the general "low life" mentality of the average Communist Party member.

He is best known for creating the character of "Towarzysz Szmaciak" (literally: Comrade Dishrag, but idiomatically Comrade Cretin or Comrade Scumbag)—an uneducated, dull, cynical, sadistic, anti-semitic and stupid individual who supported the communist party out of opportunistic, not ideological motives. The metaphor of a "dishrag" alludes to the fact that individuals of this kind, while forming the support base of communism in Poland at the time, were considered useful by the party elite (much like a dishrag is necessary to clean up dirt) but at the same time despised by them (since the dishrag itself is dirty). For ridiculing Władysław Gomułka in his poem "Cisi i gęgacze" (The Silent and the Blabbers) he was arrested in 1967 and in 1968 and sentenced to three years in prison on the charge of "spreading information harmful to the interests of [the] state". During the March events of 1968, Gomułka referred to him in several of his official speeches, calling him "a man with a mentality of a pimp" and referring to his work as "reactionary doggerel" which "breathed with poisonous sadistic venom against our (communist) authority".

Szpotański was a member of the Stowarzyszenie Pisarzy Polskich (Union of Polish Writers).

On 23 September 2006, he was posthumously awarded the Polonia Restituta Commander's Cross by the President of Poland, Lech Kaczyński.

== Works ==
- Cisi i gęgacze czyli bal u prezydenta, 1964
- Targowica czyli opera Gnoma (poświęcona obchodom milenijnym), 1966
- Ballada o cudzie na Woli: W Warszawie na Woli ukazał się duch Bieruta i sprzedawał kiełbasę po 26 zł za kilo, 1966
- Lament Wysokiego Dygnitarza, 1966
- Ballada o Łupaszcze, 1968
- Rozmowa z Kartoflami, 1968
- Gnomiada, 1976
- Caryca i Zwierciadło, 1974
- Towarzysz Szmaciak, 1977
- Szmaciak w Mundurze, Czyli Wojna Pcimska, 1983
- Sen Towarzysza Szmaciaka, 1984
- Bania w Paryżu (Unfinished), 1974–1979
