= Mira Kuś =

Polish writer (born 1948)

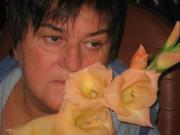
Mira Kuś

Mira Kuś (born 1948 in Gorlice, Poland) is a contemporary Polish poet. She lives in Kraków and is a journalist and member of the Polish Writers Association.

== Works ==
She graduated in physics at Jagiellonian University, and she often writes science articles for the press.

Translations of some of her poems have appeared in foreign newspapers and magazines in Germany, U.S., Sweden, Bulgaria, Slovenia, Ukraine, Hungary, Spain etc. including The Southern Review and Mid-American Review.

Poetry books

- Wiersze (samizdat, 1978)
- Gdzieś jest ta oaza (Wydawnictwo Literackie, Kraków 1981)
- Natura daje mi tajemne znaki (Warszawa 1988)
- Rajski pejzaż (Baran i Suszczyński, Kraków 1995)
- Przekłady z zieleni (Plus, Kraków 2001)
- O, niebotyczna góro garów (Kraków 2004)
- Miedzy tym a tamtym brzegiem (Wyd. Collegium Columbinum, Kraków 2010)
- Zioła i amaranty. Wybór wierszy (Wyd. Księgarnia Akademicka, 2012)
- Beneath an Avalanche of Waking (chapbook of Mid-American Review, volume XXXI, Number 2, ISSN 0747-8895, 2011)
- Żywi z Vistula River czyli Epitafia dla Przyjaciół, Znajomych, Znanych (Wyd. Efemeryczna Misja Kosmiczna Art eMKa, Kraków 2016)
- Zagubione słowa (Wyd. Efemeryczna Misja Kosmiczna Art eMKa, Kraków 2017)
- ZZa wiśniowych zasieków (Wyd. Efemeryczna Misja Kosmiczna Art eMKa, Kraków 2019)

Anthologies

- Sercem pisane. Wybór wierszy. Biblioteczka repertuarowa miesięcznika "Kultura i Ty", Warszawa 1978
- Drugi Krakowski Almanach Młodych, WL, Kraków, 1980
- Poeta jest jak dziecko, MAW, Warszawa 1987
- Wieczór jednego wiersza poetów krakowskich, Kościół oo. Karmelitów Na Piasku, wtorek 18. października 1988; IX Tydzień Kultury Chrześcijańskiej w Krakowie; wyd. Wydział Duszpasterstwa Kurii Metropolitalnej, Kraków 1988
- Od Staffa do Wojaczka Poezja polska 1939-1988, antologia, Bohdan Drozdowski i Bohdan Urbankowski, Wydawnictwo Lódzkie, Lódź 1991
- Shifting boarders, Fairleigh Dickinson University, Madison, New Jersey, 1993
- W imię miłości... antologia wierszy miłosnych poetek polskich (Oficyna Wydawniczo-Poligraficzna "Adam", Warszawa 1995)
- Ambers aglow, Host Publications, Inc, Austin, Texas, 1996
- Snuć miłość. Antologia polskiej liryki miłosnej od XV do XX w., redakcja Włodzimierza Boleckiego, Świat Książki, Warszawa 1997
- Das Unsichtbare lieben, Kirsten Gutge Verlag, Köln 1998
- Poezja i gwiazdy, SPP Oddział Kraków, Plus, Kraków, corocznie od 1995 do 2008
- Krynickie Jesienie Literackie antologia poetycka pod red. Gabrieli Matuszek, Kraków 2007
- w:Plamak, bułgarska antologia poetów polskich, Sofia 2008
- Poezija jednannja. Wirszi z Krakowa, Lwów, 2008
- Sdiełano w Polsze, wiek XX, pieriewody Andrieja Baziliewskogo, Moskwa 2009
- A csend visszhangjai, Cseby Geza, Keszthely 2010

Textbooks

- w: Słońce na stole, textbook for primary school (for the third classes, The Polish Language) Katowice

She has also published fairy tales for children in school textbooks, among others. She has won several competitions and awards.
