= Wiktor Gomulicki =

Polish poet, novelist and essayist (1848–1919)

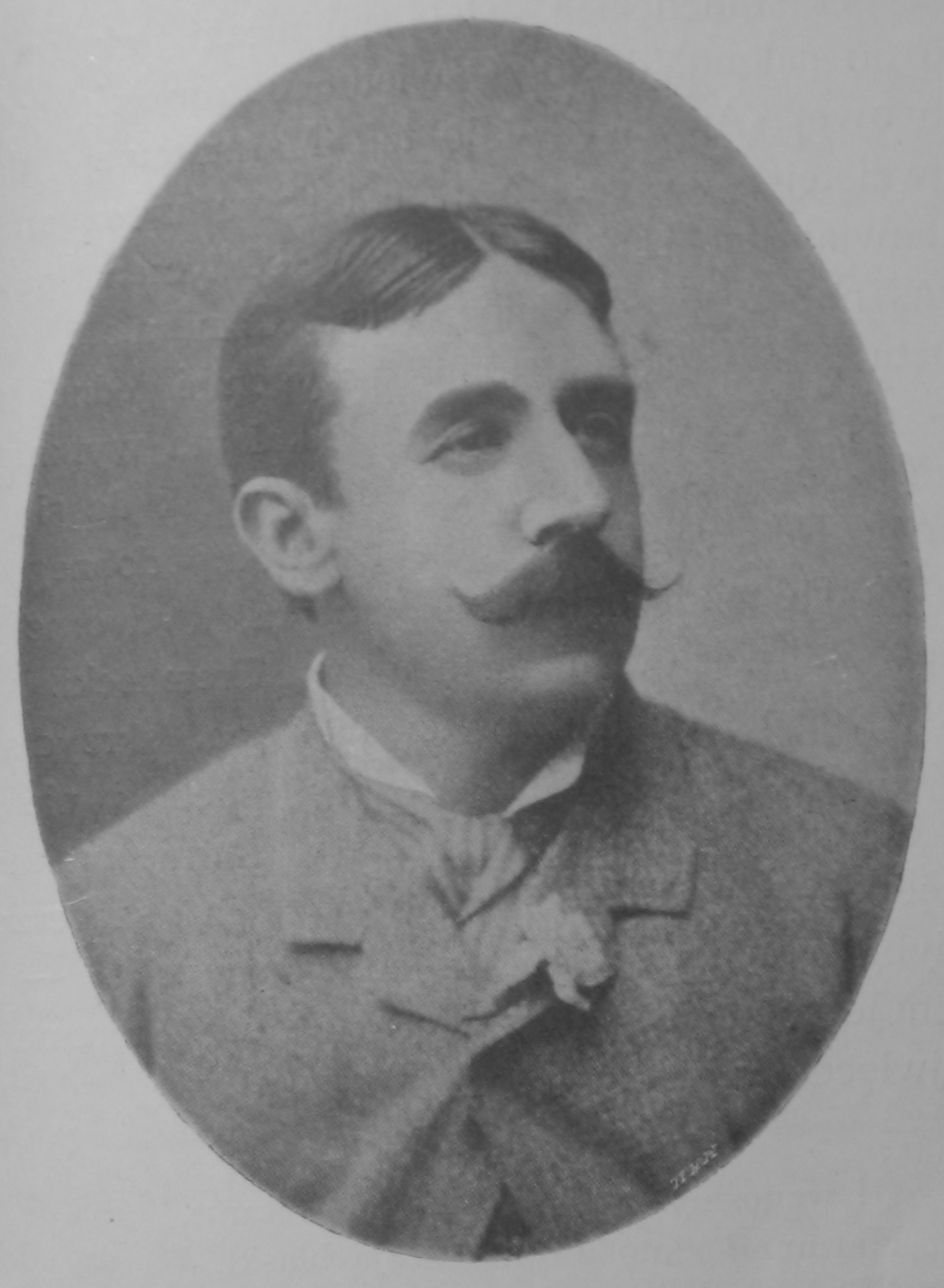
Wiktor Gomulicki (before 1905)

Wiktor Teofil Gomulicki (17 October 1848, Ostrołęka – 14 February 1919, Warsaw) was a Polish poet, novelist and essayist. He was also a major advocate of Positivism.

== Biography ==
He grew up in Pułtusk. He completed his primary education there in 1866, then studied law at the University of Warsaw. He initially worked for the periodical, Młoda Prasa then, in 1875, switched to the editorial office of the Ilustrowany Kurier Codzienny (Illustrated Daily Courier), where he published the satirical magazines Mucha (Housefly) and Kolce (Spikes). During a trip to Venice and Paris in 1888, he collected materials for a biography of Cyprian Kamil Norwid. From 1889 to 1890, he was the editor of the Tygodnik Powszechny (Weekly Universal).

In 1893, he was awarded an honorary diploma by the Royal Academy of Science, Letters and Fine Arts of Belgium. As a writer, he became known primarily for his historical novels and books for young adults. His novel, Wspomnienia niebieskiego mundurka (Memories of a Blue Uniform), based on his own life, is considered to be a classic of youth literature. His novel, Ciury, portrays the literary scene in Warsaw in the late 19th century. he also published several volumes of poetry and was the first to translate the works of Charles Baudelaire into Polish.

In 1911, he was sentenced to a year in prison for writing a preface to a patriotic story by Adam Mickiewicz, but never served any time, due to a general amnesty. He was awarded the Eliza Orzeszkowa Literature Prize in 1918.

His son, Juliusz Wiktor Gomulicki, was a literary historian and essayist. His great-grandson, Maurycy Gomulicki, is a graphic artist and photographer.

== Sources ==
- Biography @ the Wirtualna Biblioteka Literatury Polskiej
- Zygmunt Gloger: Encyklopedia staropolska ilustrowana. Vol.IV. Warsaw: P. Laskauera and W. Babickiego (Eds.), 1903.
