= Stanisław Jerzy Lec =

Polish aphorist and poet (1909–1966)

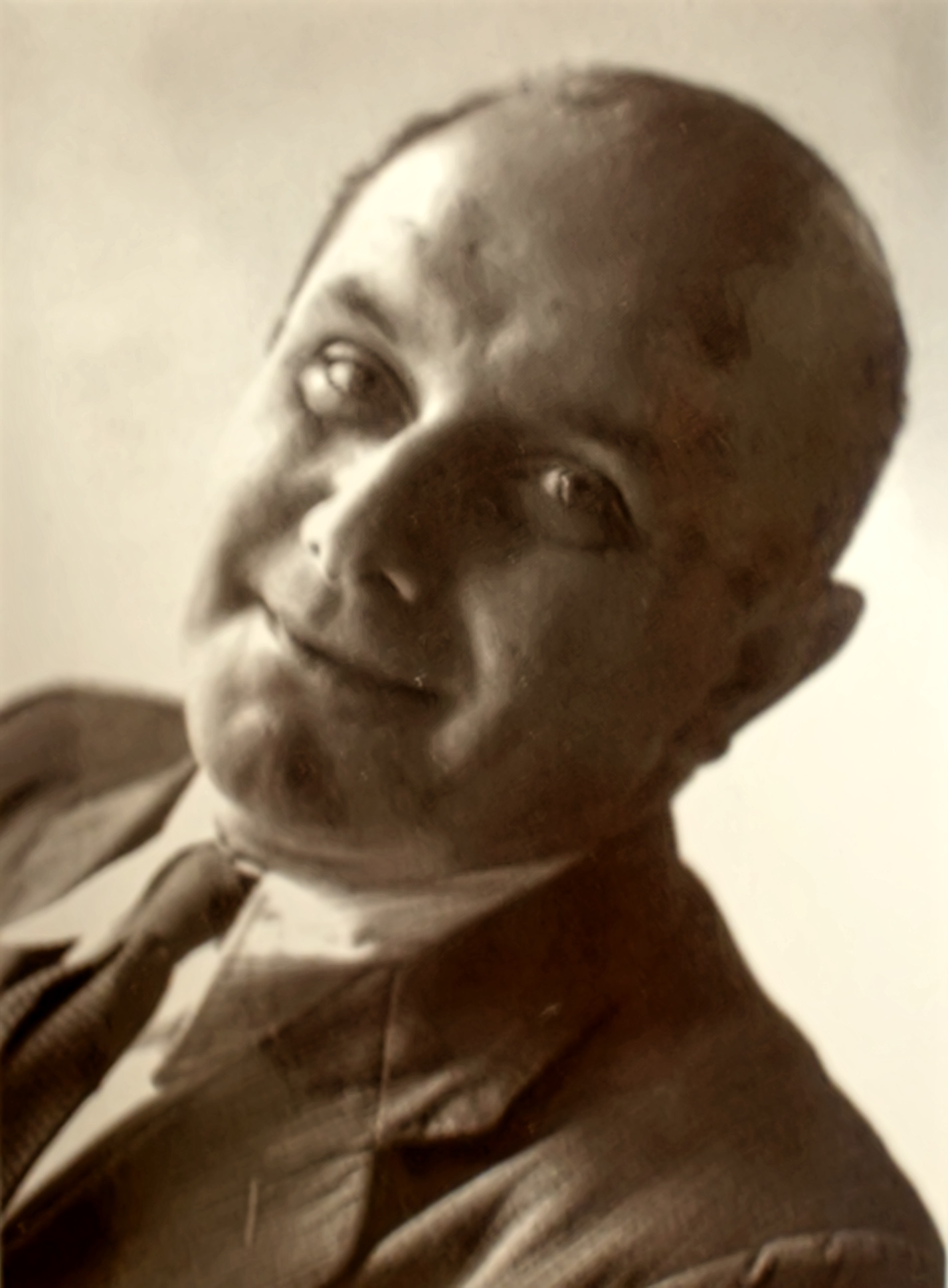
Stanisław Jerzy Lec

Stanisław Jerzy Lec (Polish pronunciation: [staˈɲiswaf ˈjɛʐɨ lɛts]; 6 March 1909 – 7 May 1966), born Baron Stanisław Jerzy de Tusch-Letz, was a Polish aphorist and poet. Often mentioned among the greatest writers of post-war Poland, he was one of the most influential aphorists of the 20th century, known for lyric poetry and ironic philosophical-moral aphorisms, often with a political subtext.

== Biography ==
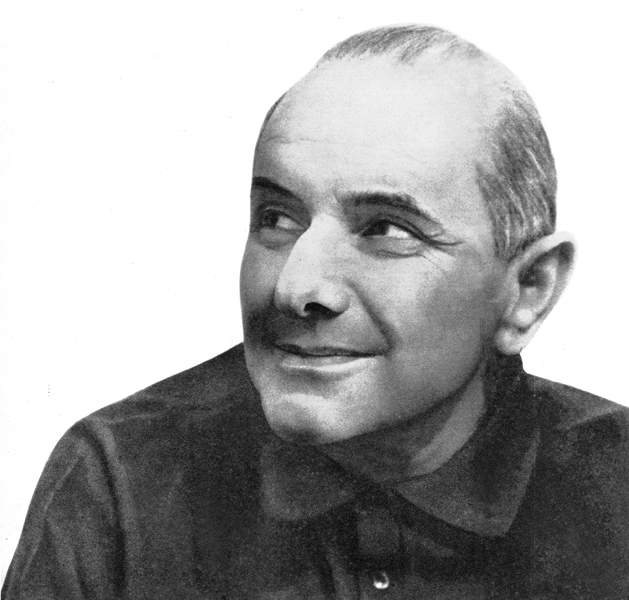
Portrait published in 1966

Son of the Baron Benno de Tusch-Letz and Adéle Safrin, he was born on 6 March 1909 in Lemberg, Austro-Hungarian Empire (now Lviv) to a Jewish nobilitated family. The family moved to Vienna at the onset of First World War, and Lec received his early education there. The father died in 1915. After the war, mother and son returned to their hometown, now called Lwów in the Second Polish Republic. Lec attended the Lemberg Evangelical School. In 1927 he matriculated and began studies at Lwów's Jan Kazimierz University in Polish language and law. He graduated in 1933.

His literary debut was in 1929. Much of his early work was lyric poetry appearing in left-wing and communist magazines. He collaborated with the communist “Dziennik Popularny" between 1933 and 1936. In 1935 he co-founded the satirical magazine Szpilki (Pins). A "literary cabaret" he founded in Lwów in collaboration with Leon Pasternak in 1936 was closed by the authorities after several performances. Nor did his law-abiding image improve after he took part in the Convention of Culture Workers, a radical congress initiated by the international communist movement Popular Front in the same year. Later that year he spent a few months in Romania, afraid that his activism could lead to his arrest in Poland. He spent the next two years in Warsaw, where he was involved with a number of other left-leaning publications.

Following the German invasion of Poland on 1 September 1939, Lec fled Warsaw, returning to his hometown, Lwów. Lec spent the years 1939–1941 there, while the city along with the rest of Polish Eastern Borderlands was occupied by the Soviet Union after the Soviet invasion of Poland on 17 September 1939. While in the Soviet Union, Lec joined in the literary life under the auspices of Ukrainian SSR authorities. He contributed to the magazine New Horizons. His poems, satires, articles, and translations from Russian were published in Krasnoe Znamya magazine. In 1940 he joined the Union of Soviet Writers of Ukraine and became a member of the editorial board of The Literary Almanac in Lwów. He wrote the first poem about Stalin written in the Polish language ("Stalin", Czerwony Sztandar, 5 December 1939). A number of his works appeared in the Czerwony Sztandar (Red Banner) newspaper. On 19 November 1939 Lec signed a resolution calling for the incorporation of Polish Eastern Borderlands into the territory of the Soviet Union. Lec's collaboration with the Soviet authorities remains controversial to this day, though he has been defended by Adam Michnik who wrote in his 2007 book that Lec has been unfairly branded by critical opinion as a "Soviet collaborator" on the basis of his "weakest, least successful, or most frankly conformist pieces".

After Nazi Germany's attack on the Soviet Union he was imprisoned in a German work camp in Tarnopol (now Ternopil), from which he made several attempts to escape. He received a death sentence for his second attempt to escape, but managed to successfully escape in 1943. In his autobiography he described his escape as having taken place after he killed his guard with a shovel when taken to dig his own grave. This became the subject of one of his most famous poems "He who had dug his own grave" (from the cycle "To Abel and Cain"):

He who had dug his own grave
looks attentively
at the gravedigger's work,
but not pedantically:
for this one
digs a grave
not for himself.

After his escape he participated in partisan warfare within the communist formations of Polish resistance (the Gwardia Ludowa and the Armia Ludowa), and eventually served in regular units of Polish People's Army until the end of the war, which he finished with the rank of major. He also edited the communist resistance underground newsletter Żołnierz w Boju (Soldier in Combat) and the communist magazine Wolny Lud (Free Nation).

Lec's wartime service allowed him to obtain a diplomatic post as a cultural attaché in Vienna. Becoming disillusioned with the Communist government, he left for Israel in 1950 with his wife, son and daughter. Lec couldn't adapt to the life in Israel and returned to Poland with his son after two years there. His wife and daughter remained in Israel. He moved to a small town in which he had been in the underground during the war, and remarried there before returning to Warsaw. At first he worked as a translator, as the Polish communist authorities had taken away his right to write or publish until the late 1950s. He was immensely popular, and despite the anti-communist and anti-totalitarian themes of his later works, he was given an official state funeral in Warsaw when he died on 7 May 1966. That year, he was awarded the Officer Cross of the Order Polonia Restituta.

== Works ==
Lec's early works were primarily lyrical poetry. In his later years, he became known for aphorisms and epigrams. He was influenced by religious (Jewish and Christian) as well as European cultural traditions. In his works he often modernized ancient messages, while preserving their universality. His notable poems such as Notatnik polowy (Field Notebook; 1946), Rękopis Jerozolimski (The Jerusalem Manuscript; 1950–1952, reedited in 1956 and 1957), and Do Kaina i Abla (To Cain and Abel; 1961) had a theme of exploring the world through irony, melancholy, and nostalgia. His later works, usually very short (aphorisms), through techniques such as wordplay, paradox, nonsense, abstract humor, and didacticism convey philosophical thoughts through single phrases and sentences. Collections of Lec’s aphorisms and epigrams include Z tysiąca jednej fraszki (From a Thousand and One Trifles; 1959), Fraszkobranie (Gathering Trifles; 1967); and Myśli nieuczesane (Unkempt Thoughts; 1957, followed by sequels in 1964 and 1966).

His work has been translated into a number of languages, including English, German, Slovak, Dutch, Italian, Serbian, Croatian, Swedish, Czech, Finnish, Bulgarian, Russian, Romanian and Spanish.

== Lec's aphorisms ==
- Those who tried to enlighten were often hanged on lampposts.
- Beyond each corner new directions lie in wait.
- It's a shame to suspect, when you are quite certain.
- The exit is usually where the entrance was.
- Some like to understand what they believe in. Others like to believe in what they understand.
- He who limps is still walking.
- In a war of ideas it is people who get killed.
- The mob shouts with one big mouth and eats with a thousand little ones.
- Even a glass eye can see its blindness.
- To whom should we marry Freedom, to make it multiply?
- I am against using death as a punishment. I am also against using it as a reward.
- You can close your eyes to reality but not to memories.
- Optimists and pessimists differ only on the date of the end of the world.
- Is it a progress if a cannibal is using knife and fork?
- If a man who cannot count finds a four-leaf clover, is he lucky?
- No snowflake in an avalanche ever feels responsible.
- All is in the hands of man. Therefore wash them often.
- Do not ask God the way to heaven; he will show you the hardest one.
- If you are not a psychiatrist, stay away from idiots. They are too stupid to pay a layman for his company.
- Thoughts, like fleas, jump from man to man, but they don't bite everybody.
- The first condition of immortality is death.
- Suppose you succeed in breaking the wall with your head. And what, then, will you do in the next cell?
- When smashing monuments, save the pedestals—they always come in handy.
- Do not expect too much of the end of the world.
- Even the masochists tell everything when tortured. From sheer gratitude.

== Family ==
Lec was married twice, first with Elżbieta Rusiewicz-Zuckerman, with whom he had a daughter Małgorzata (1941) and a son Jan (1949), and second with Krystyna Świętońska, with whom he had a son Tomasz (1955).

== Influence ==
Roman Turovsky composed a tombeau for Lec in 2018.

Radu Jude's movie "Do Not Expect Too Much from the End of the World" is titled after one of Lec's aphorisms.

== Main works ==
- Barwy, poems (1933)
- Spacer cynika, satire and epigrams (1946)
- Notatnik polowy, poems (1946)
- Życie jest fraszką, satire and epigrams (1948)
- Nowe wiersze (1950)
- Rękopis jerozolimski (1956)
- Unkempt Thoughts (Myśli nieuczesane) (1957)
- Z tysiąca i jednej fraszki (1959)
- Kpię i pytam o drogę (1959)
- Do Abla i Kaina (1961)
- List gończy (1963)
- More Unkempt Thoughts (Myśli nieuczesane nowe) (1964)
- Poema gotowe do skoku (1964)
- Fraszkobranie (1966)

== Bibliography ==
- Mirosław Nowakowski, Lexical Expectations: Lexical Operations in "Myśli nieuczesane" (Unkempt thoughts), Poznań, The Adam Mickiewicz University, 1986.
- Jacek Trznadel, Kolaboranci: Tadeusz Boy-Żeleński i grupa komunistycznych pisarzy we Lwowie, 1939–1941 ("The Collaborators"), Komorów, Fundacja Pomocy Antyk/Wydawnictwo Antyk Marcin Dybowski, 1998. ISBN 8387809012.
- Polska–Ukraina: trudna odpowiedź: dokumentacja spotkań historyków (1994–2001): kronika wydarzeń na Wołyniu i w Galicji Wschodniej (1939–1945), ed. R. Niedzielko, Warsaw, Naczelna Dyrekcja Archiwów Państwowych [Central Directorate of State Archives] & Ośrodek Karta, 2003. ISBN 8389115360, ISBN 8388288563.
- Karl Dedecius, Stanisław Jerzy Lec: Pole, Jew, European, tr. & ed. M. Jacobs, Kraków, The Judaica Foundation/Center for Jewish Culture, 2004. ISBN 8391629341. (Bilingual edition: text in Polish and English.)
- Marta Kijowska, Die Tinte ist ein Zündstoff: Stanisław Jerzy Lec — der Meister des unfrisierten Denkens, Munich, Carl Hanser, 2009. ISBN 9783446232754. (See esp. pp. 43ff.)
- Dorota Szczęśniak, "Jewish Inspirations in the Literary Work of Stanisław Jerzy Lec"; in: Poles & Jews: History, Culture, Education, ed. M. Misztal & P. Trojański, Kraków, Wydawnictwo Naukowe Uniwersytetu Pedagogicznego, 2011. ISBN 9788372716521.
