= Bronisław Maj =

Polish poet, essayist, translator, columnist, and academic teacher (born 1953)

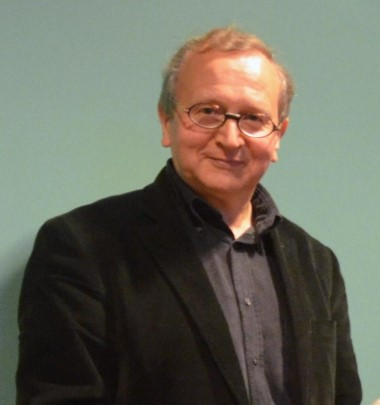
- Bronisław Maj in 2014
- Born: 19 November 1953 (age 72); Łódź, Poland
- Citizenship: Polish
- Education: Jagiellonian University
- Occupations: poet, translator, essayist
- Writing career
- Period: 1970–present
- Notable awards: Kościelski Award (1984)

Bronisław Ignacy Maj (born 19 November 1953) is a Polish poet, essayist, translator, columnist, screenwriter, playwright and academic teacher.

== Biography ==
The son of Marian Maj, radio journalist, and Maria née Brykalska, an economist.

Bronisław Maj attended and in 1972 passed matura at Jan Kasprowicz High School in Łódź. In 1977 he graduated with a master's degree in Polish philology from the Jagiellonian University in Kraków. There, in 1988 he obtained doctorate in the humanities upon thesis Świat poetycki Tadeusza Gajcego supervised by Wiesław Paweł Szymański. He lived at the Dom Literatów w Krakowie.

He published his debut poem in 1970 and debut poetry book in 1980. In 1984 he received the Kościelski Award for the poetry book Wspólne powietrze (The Common Air). In his poems Bronisław Maj touched on the metaphysical topics, though he avoided writing classical religious poetry. His poems has been translated into English, French, Spanish, Italian, German, Swedish, Russian, and Hebrew languages, among others. In 1992, he published a monograph on Tadeusz Gajcy. In 2019, his edition of poems of Krzysztof Kamil Baczyński was published.

In 1977, together with Jerzy Zoń, Adolf Weltschek and Bogdan Rudnicki, he co-founded KTO Theatre. He was friends with Jerzy Pilch.

Bronisław Maj was also a stage performer. He created and several times performed as Pani Lola (Mrs Lola), vel Karolina Surówka. He has written the lyrics for several songs by Grzegorz Turnau.

He was a lecturer of modern Polish literature at the Jagiellonian University. He lives and works in Kraków.

In 2015 due to the performance Neomonachomachia, that he has written, he was accused of offending religuous feelings by the Polish League Against Defamation; in February 2016 he was interrogated by the police. Eventually the investigation was discontinued.

== Works ==
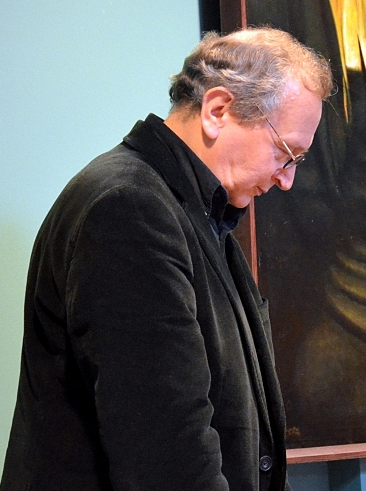
Bronisław Maj, 2014

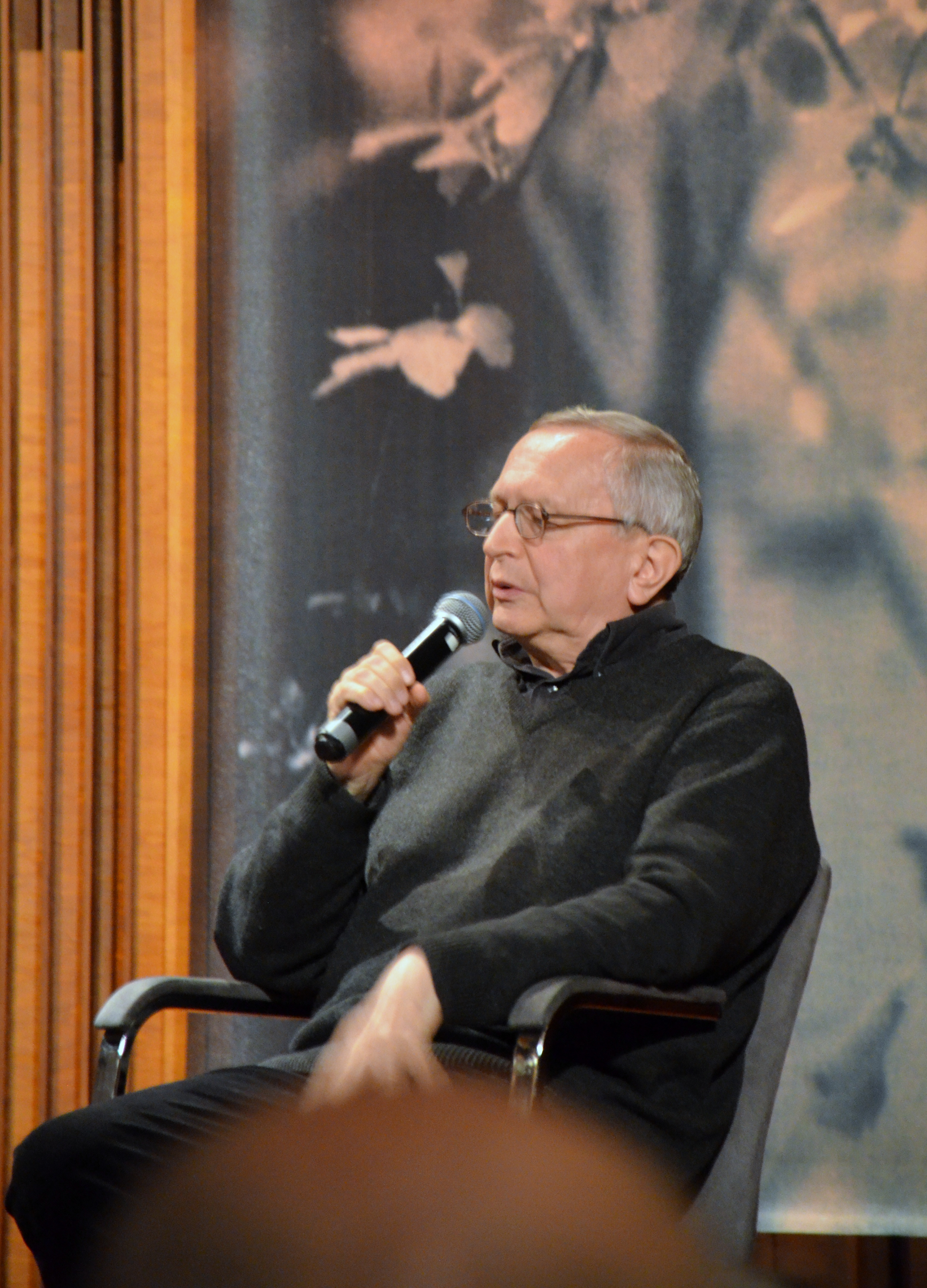
Bronisław Maj, 2021

=== Poetry ===
- Wiersze. 1980.
- Taka wolność. Wiersze z lat 1971–1975. 1981.
- Wspólne powietrze. Wydawnictwo Literackie. 1981.
- Album rodzinny. Oficyna Literacka. 1986.
- Zagłada Świętego Miasta. London. 1986.
- Zmęczenie. Znak. 1986.
- Światło. Znak. 1994.
- Elegie, treny, sny. Znak. 2003.

=== Critical monographies ===
- Biały chłopiec. O poezji Tadeusza Gajcego. Kraków: Oficyna Literacka. 1992.

=== Editions ===
- Anioł biały. Wiersze Krzysztofa Kamila Baczyńskiego. Kraków: Wydawnictwo Universitas. 2019.

=== Collection of columns ===
- Kronika wydarzeń artystycznych, kulturalnych, towarzyskich i innych. Kraków: Wydawnictwo Literackie. 1997.

== Filmography ==
=== As actor ===
- Kraj świata as a mandolinist in the underpass

=== As screenwriter ===
- Światło odbite (1989)
- Angelus (2001)

== Accolades ==
- Kościelski Award (1984)
- Nomination for Polish Film Award Eagle for best screenplay for film Angelus (2002)
- City of Kraków Award (2015)
- Cross of Freedom and Solidarity (2022)
