= Robert Rybicki =

Polish poet (born 1976)

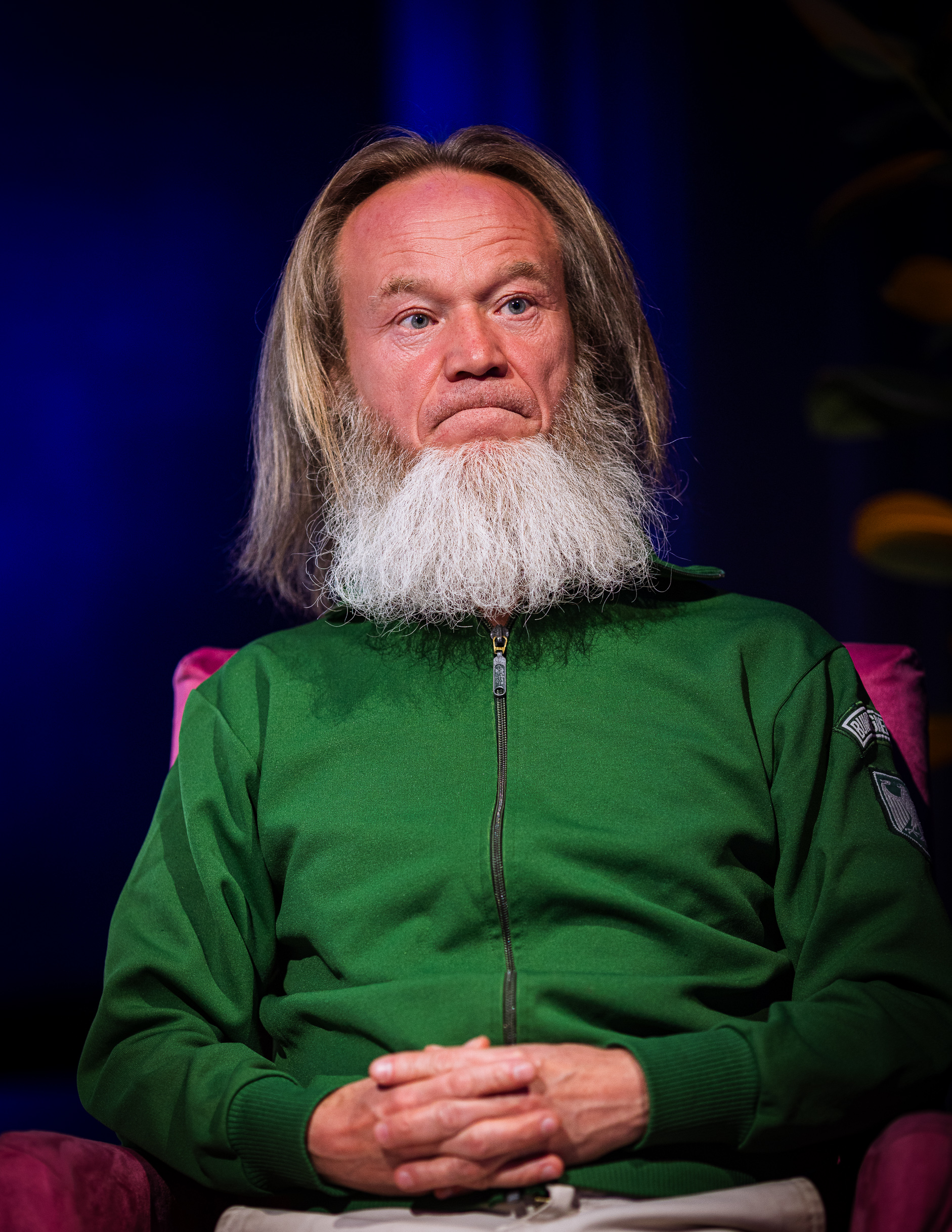
- Robert Rybicki in 2025
- Born: 1976 (age 49–50); Rybnik, Poland
- Citizenship: Polish
- Occupation: poet

Robert Rybicki (born 1976) is a Polish poet.

== Biography ==
He was editor of the arts magazine Plama in Rybnik and editor of the Polish weekly Nowy Czas in London. He studied law and Polish studies at the University of Silesia in Katowice. He was a co-founder and, since 2016, president of the Aleksander Fredro Kraków School of Poetry. In 2018 he received the Upper Silesian Literary Award “Juliusz” for the poetry book Dar Meneli.

== Poetry books ==
- Kod genetyczny. Rybnik. 2000.
- Epifanie i katatonie. Mikołów: Instytut Mikołowski. 2003. ISBN 83-912067-9-3.
- Motta robali. Mikołów: Instytut Mikołowski. 2005. ISBN 83-919112-4-1.
- Stos gitar. Warszawa: Staromiejski Dom Kultury. 2009. ISBN 83-89492-42-3.
- Gram, mózgu. Poznań: Wojewódzka Biblioteka Publiczna i Centrum Animacji Kultury w Poznaniu. 2010.
- Masakra kalaczakra. Wojewódzka Biblioteka Publiczna i Centrum Animacji Kultury w Poznaniu. 2011.
- Dar Meneli. Stronie Śląskie: Biuro Literackie. 2017.
- Podręcznik naukowy dla onironautów 1998-2018. Stronie Śląskie: Biuro Literackie. 2018.
- Pogo głosek. Stronie Śląskie: Biuro Literackie. 2019.
- blask glac. Ligota Mała: Wydawnictwo papierwdole. 2021. ISBN 9788396186935.
- myśl śliną. Kraków: Ha!art. 2022. ISBN 9788366571730.
- Kotlet frazy. Poznań: Wojewódzka Biblioteka Publiczna i Centrum Animacji Kultury w Poznaniu. 2024. ISBN 9788367433334..

=== Translations ===
- Gram mozku (Czech), translated by Petr Motýl, Malvern, Prague 2021, ISBN 9788075302991.
- The squatter's gift (English), translated by Mark Tardi, Dalkey Archive Press, Dallas 2021, ISBN 9781628973730.
