= Maria Kazecka =

Polish poet and activist

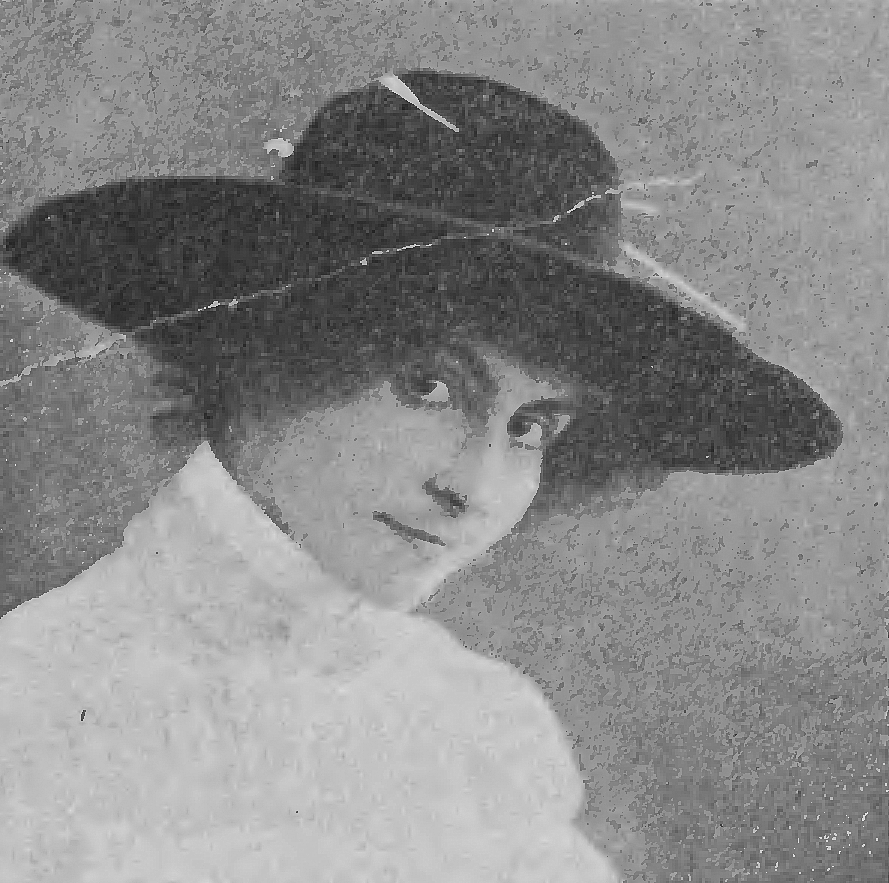
Maria Kazecka

Maria Antonina Kazecka-Morgenrot (Born 1880 in Zaliztsi (Załoźce)– Died 26 May 1938 in Lviv (Lwów)) was a Polish poet and independence activist, best remembered for her poetry collections Kędy milczy słońce (1903), and Akwarelle (1904). She took part in the Battle of Lemberg in 1918, and was the recipient of the Cross of Valour in 1922, and the Cross of Independence in 1933.
