= Marcin Malek =

Polish poet and writer

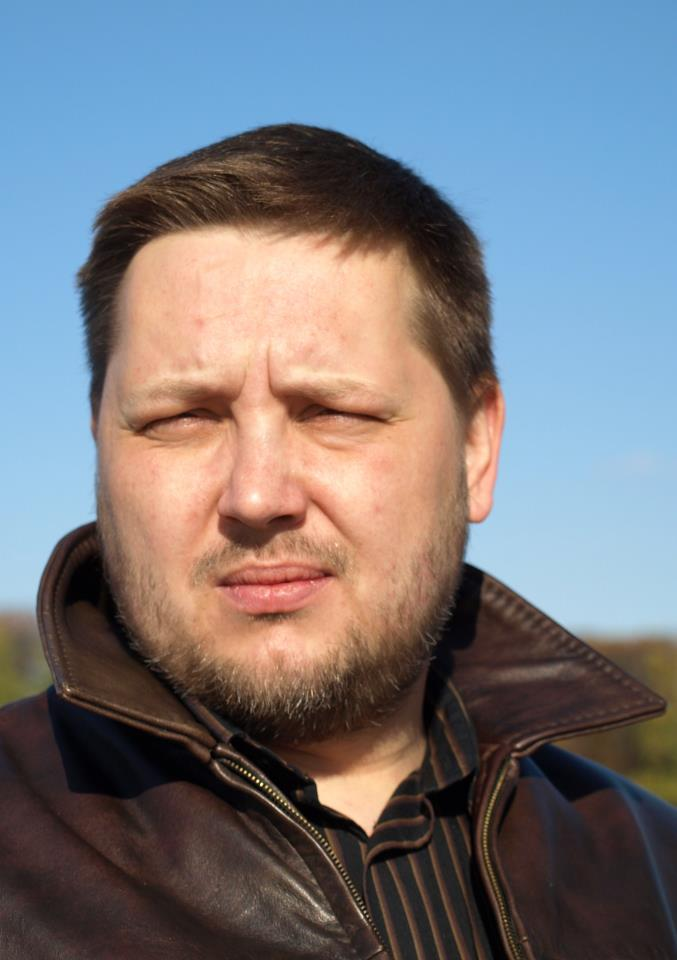
Marcin Malek in 2012

Marcin Malek (also writing under the pen name Martin Smallridge; born 24 February 1975) is a Polish poet, writer, playwright and publicist.

He is also a literature translator to Russian and English (both ways), including press articles in the field of international affairs and cultural releases as well as Russian and English-language poetry along with the letters of Alexander Sergeyevich Pushkin. Published mainly in quarterlies: "Fronda", "Tygiel Kultury", "Akcent" and monthlies: "Nowe Państwo", „Stosunki Międzynarodowe", "Opcja na prawo", "Dziś", Winner of the annual award of "Poetry&Paratheatre" journal (category: Poem of the Year) for year 2012, (work: Bieg – Czyli list do współczesnych / "Run – a letter to the present").

== Life ==
Marcin Malek (born 24 February 1975, Warsaw, Poland) is a Polish-Irish writer, poet, essayist, journalist, and editor. He studied International Affairs (Diplomacy) and Customs Administration Services. Since 2006, he has lived in Ireland, where he has been actively engaged in both literary and journalistic work.

In 2021, Malek founded and became editor-in-chief of The Irish Field Archery Monthly (TIFAM), a printed periodical dedicated to archery, covering historical, technical, and cultural aspects of the sport. Under his leadership, TIFAM has grown into a significant publication within the Irish and international archery communities.

Additionally, he has served in various roles as a volunteer board member of TIFAM CLG, a registered non-profit organization dedicated to promoting traditional archery in Ireland. He currently serves as the secretary of TIFAM CLG, playing a key role in organizational governance, strategic development, and advocacy efforts. Through his work with TIFAM CLG, Malek has been instrumental in organizing the TIFAM All-Ireland Archery Festival and supporting the development of the National Archery Centre, a long-term project aimed at fostering the sport’s growth in Ireland.

Beyond his contributions to archery, Malek continues to write and publish extensively on literature, history, and international affairs. His literary style, blending Gothic, Romantic, and existential themes, has earned him recognition across multiple disciplines.

== Creative activity ==
In recent years Malek devoted himself mainly to poetry. As he says: he "finally found a place where he belongs, and all that he owns, is the power of his words, and a momentous awareness of consequences". He is of the opinion, that "poetry is like a spurt; elusive, and not enough to say — inexplicable". In his writing "poetry is the way into the unknown is still asks questions and never hears correct answers. And so – to be a poet is no more than wander around and ask every encountered soul for directions." In his opinion, poetry is "a storage of historical curiosities, in which we keep rarely used words, and poets are workers who use these words as the raw material. The snag is that they work blindly because with such material you can never be sure, and it is difficult to predict what falls out of the assembly line." In his opinions of other poets he expresses himself very carefully saying that they live "somewhere out there, where we mere mortals do not have access – on the other side, in the midst of spells, myths and legends." He explains that "poets have something in common with the unfortunate Icarus, whose flight and fall are widespread symbols of the human thoughtful pursuit of unattainable objectives against the natural order of the world. We want to see them as those who are in pursuit of reality, those fully aware of their tremendous responsibility, always faithful to a supreme idea, entering boldly where none seemingly normal would dare to enter – mainly because our "me" bothers us more than anything else. Poet (who lives inside us) has thousands of them – continues in perpetual flight to fall and to rise, and so it goes, he passes from one dimension to another becoming his own multiplication. Sometimes Malek calls himself an invented character, once he admitted that he associates with the ghosts, and that "under the pressure of certain words", he simply "does not know how to be himself."

== Books ==
- Fabryka słów w stu jeden wierszach, Wyd. Wydawnictwo Miniatura, Kraków 2010. ISBN 9788376062181 Words factory in a hundred and one poems, Publisher. Miniatura, Kraków 2010.
- My wszyscy z wierszy Wyd. Wydawnictwo Miniatura, Kraków 2011. ISBN 9788376062792 We are all of the poems, Publisher. Miniatura, Kraków 2011.
- Z powiek opłatki krwi. Wyd. Wydawnictwo Miniatura, Kraków 2011. ISBN 9788376063195 Blood wafers of eyelids, Publisher. Miniatura, Kraków 2011.
- Spomiędzy rzeczy. Wyd. Wydawnictwo Miniatura, Kraków 2012. ISBN 9788376063416 Among the things, Publisher. Miniatura, Kraków 2012. (Bilingual book Polish/English)
- Pamiętnik z niedokończonej wyprawy. Wyd. Miniatura, Kraków 2012. ISBN 9788376063775 Diary of an unfinished journey, Publisher. Miniatura, Kraków 2012.(Bilingual book Polish/English)
- Nazwijcie mnie idiotą. Wyd. Wydawnictwo Miniatura, Kraków 2012. ISBN 9788376064406 Call me an idiot, Publisher. Miniatura, Kraków 2012.
- Jedną nogą. Wyd. Wydawnictwo Miniatura, Kraków 2013. ISBN 9788376065861 By one leg, Publisher. Miniatura, Kraków 2013. (Bilingual book Polish/English)
- For life and death of a poet. Publisher Lyrics, Lublin 2015. ISBN 9788394316211 ASIN B014B7L66Y (English)
- Na życie i śmierć poety. Publisher Lyrics, Lublin 2015. ISBN 9788394316204 "For life and death of a poet. Lyrics, 2015". ASIN B014CCFOCK
- Znaki żywego alfabetu. Publisher Lyrics, Lublin 2015. ISBN 9788394316228 " The characters of live alphabet. Lyrics, 2015". ASIN B014N3KQCG
- Facies Hippocratica. Publisher Lyrics, 2015. ISBN 9781519332684
- "Najgorsze jest pierwsze sto lat". Publisher Lyrics, 2015. ISBN 9781519587541 "The worst part is a first hundred years, Lyrics 2015"
- Ponad miarę ludzkiej materii. Publisher Lyrics, 2015. ISBN 9781326458898 "Beyond the measure of human matter, Lyrics 2015"
- Anthology of slavic poetry. by Piotr Kasjas Lulu.com, 16 Oct 2016. ISBN 9781326786229, poems on pages 161-165.
- We'll go asleep. Poems and ballads. Publisher Lyrics, 2020 Portlaoise. ISBN 9798564472470, ASIN : B08NF32F8N Lyrics 2020"
- Breaking through the inky night: On trivial yet deadly serious matters. Publisher Lyrics Editorial House, May 13, 2021, Portlaoise. ISBN 979-8503858525, ASIN : B094TG1P6W Lyrics 2021". Published under pen name Martin Smallridge
- The mills kept grinding. Publisher Lyrics Editorial House, August 25, 2021, Portlaoise. ISBN 979-8463763839, ASIN : B09DMXTHMR Lyrics Editorial House 2021". Published under pen name Martin Smallridge
- A lifetime of questions In Thirty and One Literature Lectures . Publisher Lyrics Editorial House, November 11, 2024, Portlaoise. ISBN 979-8346271529, ASIN : B0DMSZLY75 Lyrics Editorial House 2024". Published under pen name Martin Smallridge
- A Drawer Full of Wonders. Publisher Lyrics Editorial House, November 12, 2024, Portlaoise. ISBN 979-8285744047, ASIN : B0DMW8X2PH Lyrics Editorial House 2024". Published under pen name Martin Smallridge
- An T-ocras. Publisher Lyrics Editorial House, March 1, 2025, Portlaoise. ISBN 979-8319442819, ASIN: B0CW1FHZ8V Lyrics Editorial House 2025. Published under pen name Martin Smallridge
- The Peculiar Incidents of Zacharie Blanchard: Book I – Crooked Hill's Dern . Publisher Lyrics Editorial House, 2025, Portlaoise. ISBN 979-8285744047, ASIN: B0FB9GDNBM Lyrics Editorial House 2025. Published under pen name Martin Smallridge
- Where the Maps Ends: A Life Threaded Through Forty Literary Lectures . Publisher Lyrics Editorial House, 2025, Portlaoise. ISBN 979-8287715984, ASIN:B0FCSKTQSK Lyrics Editorial House 2025. Published under pen name Martin Smallridge
- The Ring, the Cat, and Paddy’s Missing Digit: A dark comedy in four acts. Publisher Lyrics Editorial House, 2025, Portlaoise. ISBN 979-8287557355, ASIN: B0FCMQW8W9 Lyrics Editorial House 2025. Published under pen name Martin Smallridge
- No Rest for the Dead in Portlaoise: Dark Comedy in five Acts. Publisher Lyrics Editorial House, 2025, Portlaoise. ISBN 979-8287585709, ASIN: B0FCN1MLJ7 Lyrics Editorial House 2025. Published under pen name Martin Smallridge
- Hauntings of Dún na nGall: An Irish Gothic Play in Five Acts. Publisher Lyrics Editorial House, 2025, Portlaoise. ISBN 979-8287867621, ASIN: B0FCZYK1L8 Lyrics Editorial House 2025. Published under pen name Martin Smallridge
- The Mourner's Wake: Irish Folklore Dark Comedy in four Acts. Publisher Lyrics Editorial House, 2025, Portlaoise. ISBN 979-8287695057, ASIN: B0FCSQZ882 Lyrics Editorial House 2025. Published under pen name Martin Smallridge
- Facies Hippocratica: A Grim Tragedy in Four Acts. Publisher Lyrics Editorial House, 2025, Portlaoise. ISBN 979-8288183553, ASIN: B0FD8VBRW6, english Edition, Lyrics Editorial House 2025. Published under pen name Martin Smallridge
- The Creed of the Loosed Arrow in Flight. Publisher : TIFAM Publishing, 2025, Portlaoise. ISBN 979-8316285358, ASIN: B0F2ZKW6HD, TIFAM Publishing 2025. Published under pen name Martin Smallridge
- Irish Archery An Ecology in Motion. Publisher : TIFAM Publishing, 2025, Portlaoise. ISBN 979-8283315317, ASIN: B0F893LZ2L, Publisher : TIFAM Publishing 2025. Published under pen name Martin Smallridge
- The last "foes of humanity" . Publisher : Publisher Lyrics Editorial House, 2025, Portlaoise. ISBN 979-8301883897, ASIN: B0DPDQ4SHR, Lyrics Editorial House 2025. Published under pen name Martin Smallridge
- The Fall of Jeremiah Grant: An Irish Tragedy in Five Acts " . Publisher : Publisher Lyrics Editorial House, 2025, Portlaoise. ISBN 979-8288084324, ASIN: B0FD858XN4, Lyrics Editorial House 2025. Published under pen name Martin Smallridge

== Journals ==
- "Fronda" nr 29, wiosna 2003

Chcemy znać ostatnią wersję prawdy

- "Fronda" nr 31, Boże Narodzenie 2003

Kto nie widział, ten nie zrozumie

- Kwartalnik "Akcent" nr 4 (94) 2003

Od Puszkina do Czuchraja. Literackie szkice o Rosji

- "Stosunki Międzynarodowe":

Terroryzm medialny – Nowa forma komunikacji międzyludzkiej, wrzesień 2004

Trzy maski na jedną twarz, październik 2004

Kłopotliwy Karzeł w Cieniu Giganta, październik 2004

Kto się boi Sharona?, listopad 2004

Zaolzie i Spisz, kwiecień 2005

Rosyjskie a priori, maj 2005

- "Tygiel Kultury" nr 10-12/2004

Apokalipsa po rosyjsku

- "Fronda" nr 35, wiosna 2005

Rosyjski übermensch

- "Opcja na prawo" nr 10/46, październik 2005

Rosja jak "dzika Bela"

- "Opcja na prawo" nr 11/47, listopad 2005

Gwiazdozbiór smoka

- "Tygiel Kultury" nr 10-12/2005

Gwiazdozbiór smoka

- "Nowe Państwo" nr 1 (361), zima 2006

Wiek Smoka

- "Opcja na prawo" nr 1/49, styczeń 2006

Brunatny wiatr odnowy

- "Tygiel Kultury" nr 1-3/2006

Rosja jak "dzika Bela"

- "Worldpress.org" August 3, 2016

The Jedwabne Massacre of 1941: An Interview with Marcin Malek " by Teri Schure

- "Worldpress.org" March 12, 2018

"Polish Death Camps" Controversy

- "Leinster Express" May 17, 2020

"Portlaoise story in a time of Covid lockdown

- "The Irish Field Archery Monthly" multiple articles of different genres (since December 2021)
