= Stanisław Stabro =

Polish poet, literary critic, and historian, and academic teacher (born 1948)

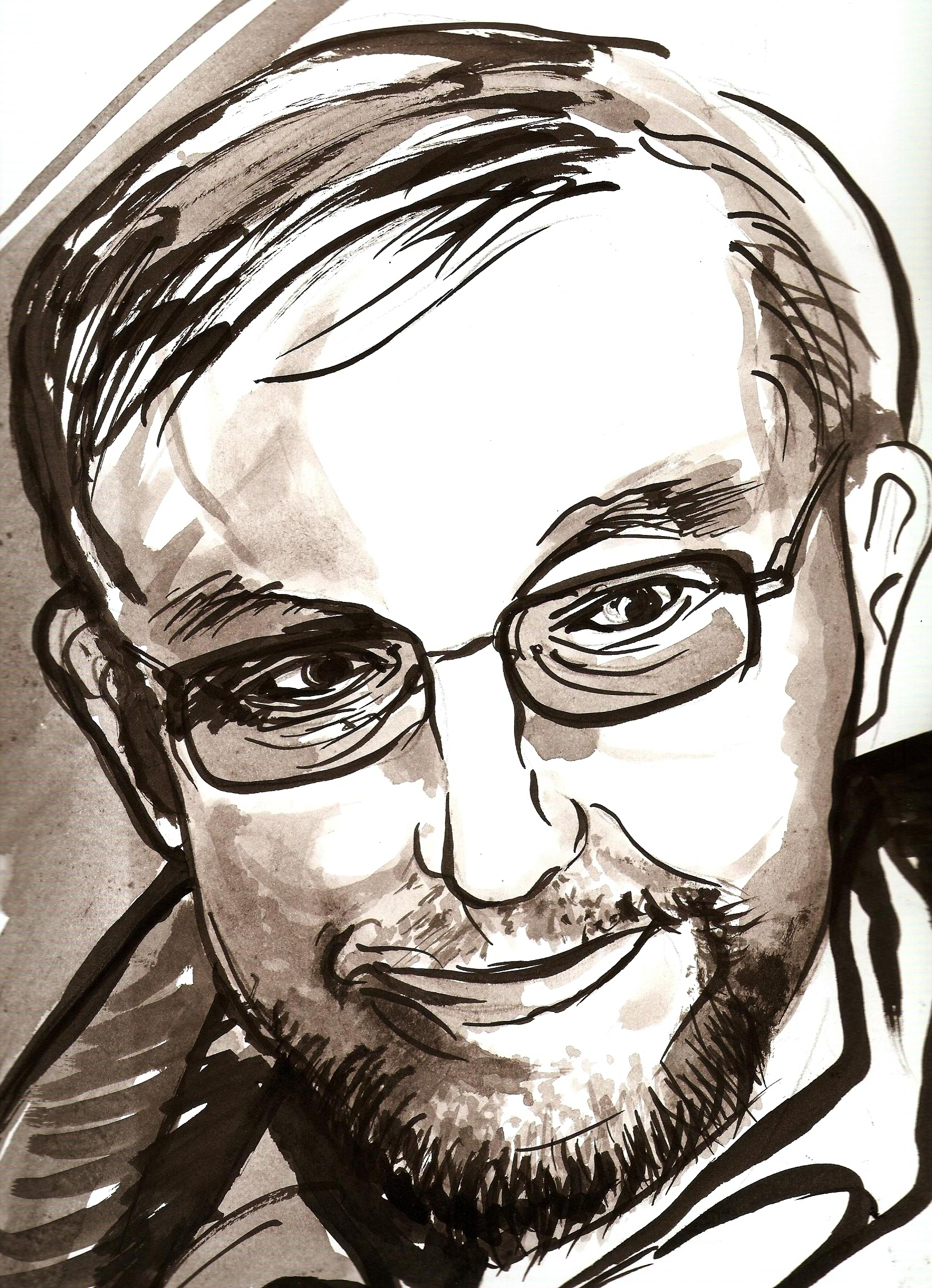
- Born: 23 August 1948 (age 78); Świdnica
- Citizenship: Polish
- Education: Jagiellonian University
- Occupations: poet, literary critic, literary historian
- Writing career
- Period: 1967–present

Stanisław Stabro (Note: Legal first names: Stanisław Zbigniew. Birth surname: Bryndza. From 1967, he signed his texts with the surname Stabro. From 1975, he used the surname Bryndza-Stabro.) (born 23 August 1948) is a poet, literary critic and historian, lecturer at the Jagiellonian University, co-founder of Teraz group, co-creator of new wave in Polish poetry.

== Biography ==
The son of Stanisław Bryndza, a carpenter, and Helena née Sitarz, a clerk. He spent his childhood in Maków Podhalański. He attended high school in Sucha Beskidzka.

In 1966, he won an award in the Czerwona Tarcza inter-school poetry competition, after which he participated informally in the work of the Kraków Young Writers' Circle of the Polish Writers' Union (ZLP). He also served briefly as a field correspondent for the "Gazeta Krakowska" in 1966. After graduating that year, he studied Polish studies at the Jagiellonian University (UJ) in Kraków and graduated with master's degree in 1972. In 1975, he became a member of the Polish Writers' Union (ZLP); in the years 1977–1979, he served as supervisor of the Youth Circle of the Kraków Branch of the ZLP.

In 1977 he obtained doctorate at the Jagiellonian University upon thesis Liryka Krzysztofa Baczyńskiego na tle tradycji supervised by Marian Stępień. In 1989, he became a member of the Polish Writers Association. He obtained habilitation in 1997 upon the book Poezja i historia. Od Żagarów do Nowej Fali.

== Poetry books ==
- Requiem. 1973.
- Dzień Twojego narodzenia. 1974.
- Ten wiersz, który na imię ma Polska. 1978. Published in drugi obieg.
- Na inne głosy rozpiszą nasz głos. 1978.
- Pożegnanie księcia. 1981.
- Dzieci Leonarda Cohena. 1984.
- Korozja. Wiersze z lat 1982–1984. 1989.
- Wiersze wybrane. 1989.
- Wybór wierszy. 1989.
- Życie do wynajęcia. 1996.
- Oko thery. 2008.

== Monographs ==
- Legenda i twórczość Marka Hłaski. Nauka dla wszystkich. 1985.
- "Poeta odrzucony". 1989.
- Chwila bez imienia. 1991.
- Poezja i historia: od Żagarów do Nowej Fali. 1995.
- Literatura polska 1944–2000 w zarysie. 2002.
- Od Emila Zegadłowicza do Andrzeja Bobkowskiego. O prozie polskiej XX wieku. 2002.
- Klasycy i nie tylko... Studia o poezji XX wieku. 2012.

== Distinctions ==
- Gold Cross of Merit (2000)
- Medal of the Commission of National Education (2003)
- Silver Gloria Artis Medal for Merit to Culture (2015)
