= Piotr Mierzwa =

Polish poet, translator, and activist (born 1980)

- Born: October 31, 1980 (age 45)
- Citizenship: Polish
- Occupations: poet, translator, activist

Piotr Sylwester Mierzwa (born 31 October 1980) is a poet, essayist, translator and activist.

== Biography ==
In his youth he obtained scholarship of the Polish Children's Fund. He attended the Adam Mickiewicz 6th General Education Lyceum in Kraków, then to UWC Atlantic College in Llantwit Major, Wales, where he passed the International Baccalaureate.

In 2008, he graduated with a degree in English from the Jagiellonian University. From 2001 to 2004, he served as president of the Jagiellonian University Students' English Society. In 2003, he studied on a scholarship at the University of Northern Iowa.

He has published twelve books of poetry, including his debut volumes Mały (Oficyna Literacka: Kraków 1997) and Gościnne Morze (Zielona Sowa: Kraków 2005), as well as a collection of essays Próby bycia wariatem i inne możliwości ponoszenia porażki we współczesnej Polsce (Attempts to Be Mad and Other Possibilities of Failure in Contemporary Poland). He has published in print and online magazines, including Dwutygodnik, Helikopter, Kontent, Stoner Polski, and Wydawnictwo J, and in international anthologies, including Anthologia#2, off_press publishing: London 2010, own translation; Poesía a contragolpe. Antología de poesía polaca contemporánea (autores nacidos entre 1960 y 1980), PUZ: Zaragoza 2012, poems in Polish and translated into English, Spanish, Catalan, and Swedish.

He has also been active in promoting mental health awareness and combating the stigmatization of the mentally ill in Poland. From 2003 to 2007, he volunteered for the organization L’Arche, translating for its meetings and workshops. He lives in Kraków. He runs the literary blog snubrata.

== Poetry books ==
- mały (Oficyna Literacka: Kraków 1997);
- Gościnne morze (Zielona Sowa: Kraków 2005);
- Zapowiedzi (2013);
- Życia, zgłoski (potrzeba miłości). Wiersze zebrane z lat 2010–2014;
- janíe (Convivo: Warszawa 2022);
- Wiersze. Wybór, selected and with an afterword by Anna Matysiak (Convivo: Warszawa 2022).
