= Stanisław Kalina Jaglarz =

Polish poet (born 1991)

- Born: 1991 (age 34–35); Katowice
- Citizenship: Polish
- Occupations: poet, translator

Stanisław Kalina Jaglarz (born 1991) is a Polish transgender poet and translator.

In 2025 he obtained the Wisława Szymborska Foundation residency.

== Poetry books ==
- gościć sójki, Wydawnictwo Biblioteki Śląskiej, Katowice 2022. ISBN 978-83-67152-13-6
- zajęczy żar, Wydawnictwo Warstwy, Wrocław 2024. ISBN 978-83-67186-19-3

=== Translation ===
- Oleksandr Averbuch, Pieśni gniewu i tęsknoty, Wydawnictwo Pogranicze, Sejny 2024. ISBN 978-83-68114-09-6

== Accolades ==
- Nomination for the Silesius Wrocław Poetry Award in the debut category for the volume gościć sójki (2023),
- nomination for the Wisława Szymborska Award for the volume gościć sójki (2023),
- Kazimierz Hoffman “Kos” Poetry Award for the volume zajęczy żar (2025),
- Nomination for the Wisława Szymborska Award for the volume zajęczy żar (2025)
- Konstanty Ildefons Gałczyński Orpheus Award for the best volume of poetry of 2024 for the volume zajęczy żar (2025)
