= Włodzimierz Szymanowicz =

Polish painter and poet

Włodzimierz Szymanowicz (born Wrocław, Poland; September 3, 1946 – March 4, 1967) was a Polish painter and poet. He was the son of Jadwiga, a Polish aristocrat, and Kazimierz Szymanowicz who was Polish of Jewish descent.

Szymanowicz is known mostly for his poems, including one in which is included lyrics to a popular song composed years after his death (Zaproście mnie do stołu, which won an award at the National Festival of Polish Song in Opole in 1974). While none of his poems were published while he was alive, many survive and some have been published posthumously.
