= Leon Pasternak =

Leon Pasternak (1910 – 1969) was a Polish poet and satirist. His Jewish family came to Poland in the 1880s from the town of Tula, Russia, which was outside the Jewish Pale of Settlement, where Jews usually were not allowed to reside.

Pasternak was born on 12 August 1910 at Lemberg, Austro-Hungarian Empire.

The Tula Pasternaks belonged to a class of "Jewish Landed Gentry" that resided in the manors of the gentile aristocracy, and managed their agricultural estates. In the case of the Pasternaks the estates were in the vicinity of Yasnaya Polyana, Leo Tolstoy's estate. Tolstoy invited Leonid Pasternak, a member of the Odessa branch of the family, to illustrate his books. Leonid's son, Boris Pasternak who became years later a famous poet, wrote the novel "Letters from Tula", maybe in tribute to his relatives. The Tula Pasternaks were very much assimilated - one of Leon's aunts was called Marie, a Christian name that no "proper" Jew would have given a daughter of his. Leon's faith was not religious but a universal humanitarian one.

In the 1920s Leon was a young idealist and committed communist. As a result of his political activities — writing satirical verses for socialist revolutionary periodicals, and spreading communist propaganda in any possible way — Leon had to leave Lwow for Warsaw. There his works quickly became popular, but soon the "literary cabaret" which he founded in collaboration with Stanislaw Lec (referred to as the Theater of Boys by some and as the Five Kopeck Theater by others), was closed by the authorities, after only eight performances.

In 1934, Leon then a young man of 24, was imprisoned in the Bereza Kartuska prison, the first concentration camp in Poland in which political prisoners were held without trial by the Polish regime. His relatives traveled from Lwow with parcels of warm clothing and food to help him sustain the harsh conditions of jail. Meanwhile across the border in the Soviet Union, Leon's relative Boris Pasternak escaped a similar fate of ideological imprisonment: Boris became disillusioned with communist ideals, and was about to be arrested. Supposedly Stalin himself had crossed Boris's name off an arrest list during the Great Purge. After one year in prison, Leon Pasternak was released.

In the beginning of World War II, he fled to the USSR. He joined the 1st Tadeusz Kościuszko Infantry Division that fought against the Nazis to liberate Poland. He wrote for the divisional newspaper Żołnierz Wolności and was the director of the divisional theater. The theater subsequently became the First Polish Army theater and became the first theater in the Polish People's Republic. He was the author of the famous marching song Oka.

After the war was over, he resumed the satirical weekly "Szpilki" with Stanisław Jerzy Lec and Jerzy Zaruba, which they edited together at first, and became the vice-chairman of the Polish Writers' Union. Pasternak was married to the Polish actress Ryszarda Hanin.

"Leon Pasternak was idealistic till the end, faithful till his last breath" said Ryszard Marek Gronski the well known Polish author and poet.

He died 14 November 1969 at Warsaw, Poland.
