= Przemysław Suchanecki =

Polish poet and translator (born 1992)

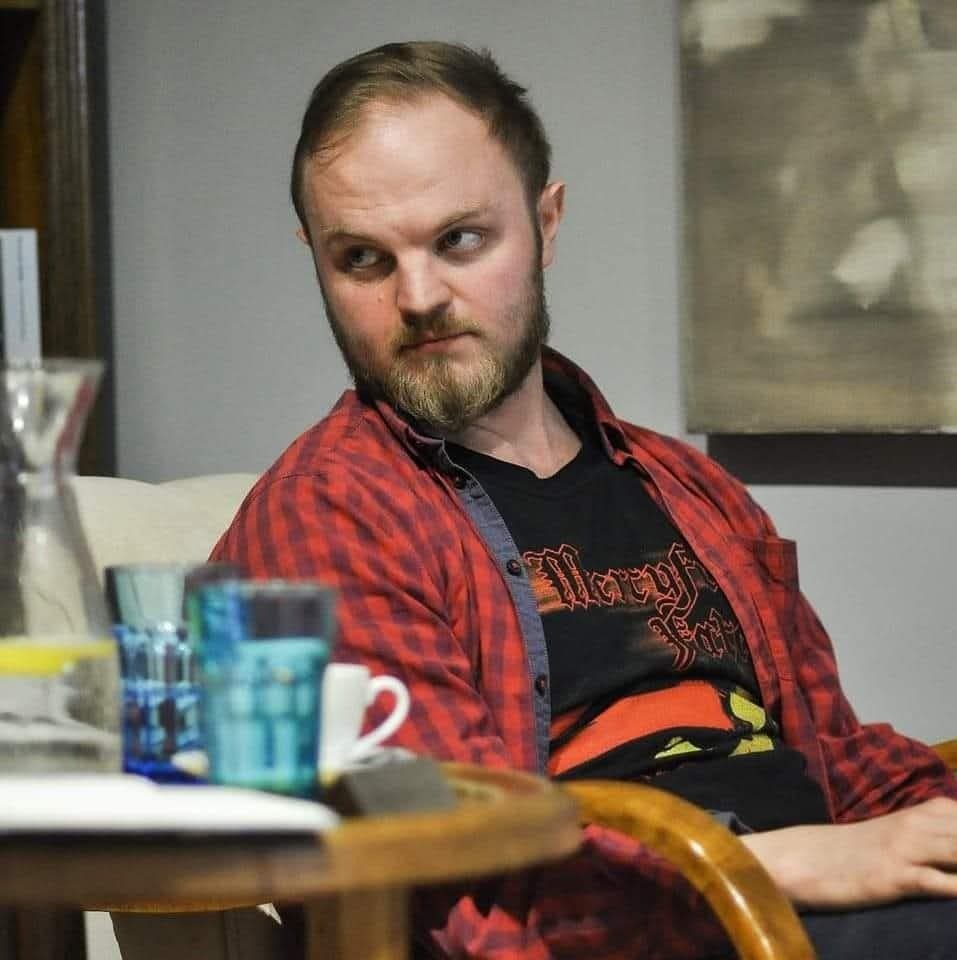
- Przemysław Suchanecki, 2022
- Occupations: poet, translator

Przemysław Suchanecki is a poet and translator.

His poems were translated into Ukrainian and Slovenian languages.

== Poetry books ==
- Wtracenie (Biuro Literackie, 2019),
- O (Biuro Literackie, 2021),
- Na rogu (Wydawnictwo papierwdole, 2023),
- Łucznik (Fundacja KONTENT, 2024),
- Żarna (Convivo, 2025).

== Awards and nominations ==
For his debut, Wtracenie (Biuro Literackie, 2019), he was nominated for the Wiesław Kazanecki Literary Award of the Mayor of Białystok in 2020. For Łucznik, he was nominated for the Gdynia Literary Prize in 2025.
