= Zbigniew Bieńkowski =

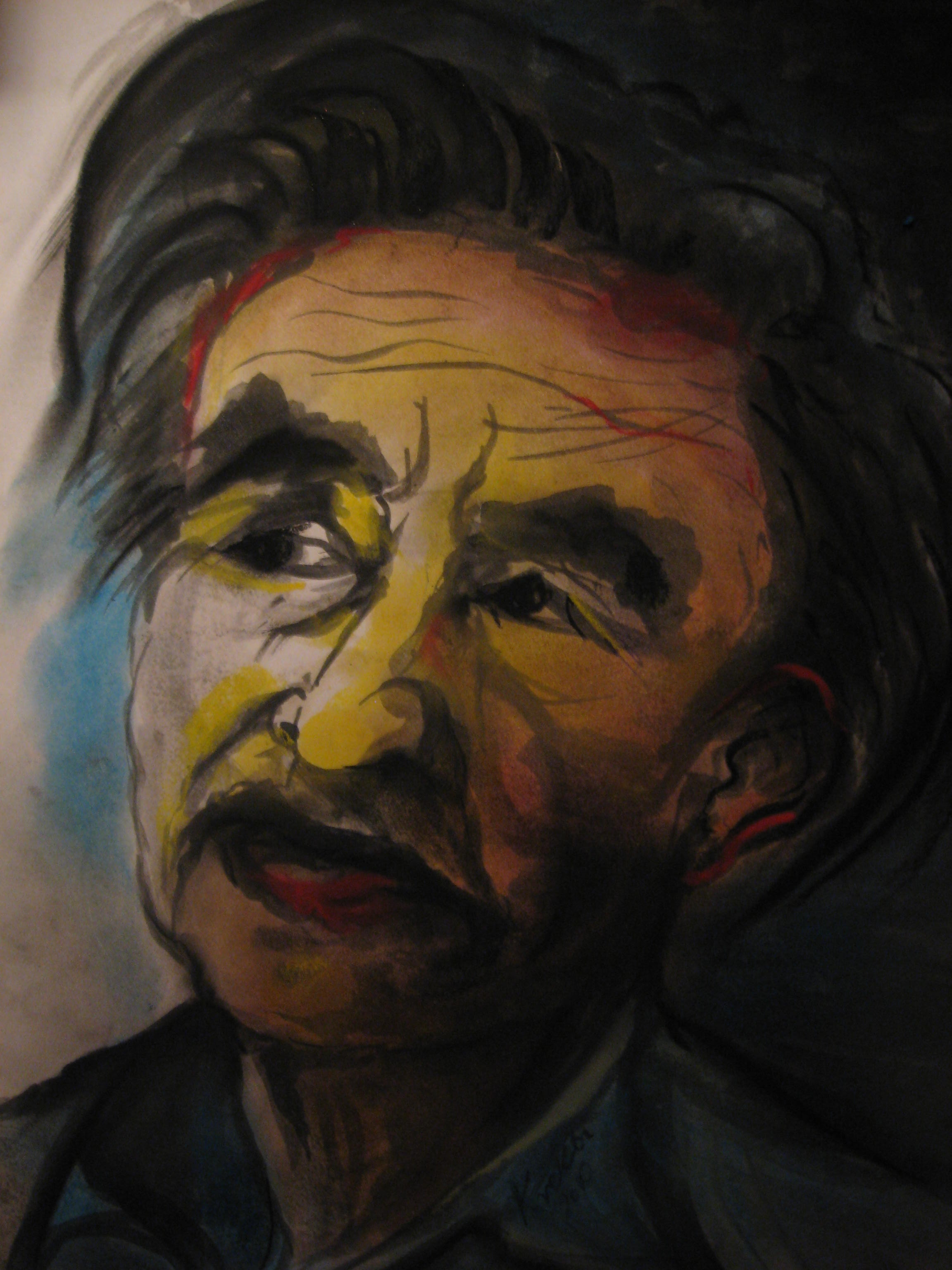
Zbigniew Bieńkowski

Zbigniew Bieńkowski (31 August 1913, in Warsaw — 23 February 1994) was a Polish poet, literary critic, translator and essayist.

== Biography ==
Bieńkowski graduated in 1931 from the Gymnasium XX Marian in Bielany near Warsaw. From 1932 to 1939 he studied at the University of Warsaw law at the Faculty of Law, as well as at the Faculty of Humanities. Bieńkowski received a one-year scholarship from the Sorbonne and moved to Paris in 1938. In 1939 he moved to Italy and then to Yugoslavia, where he was caught by the outbreak of World War II. He returned to Poland during the Nazi occupation. He fought as a soldier for the Armia Krajowa, and participated in the Warsaw Uprising.

After the war he worked in the editorial department of the Rzeczpospolita daily, then in the weekly Odrodzenie and monthly Twórczość.

In 1960 he married Małgorzata Hillar.

Bieńkowski was a member of the Polish PEN Organization from 1966 to 1972.

The authors on which he focused as a translator include: Charles Baudelaire, Victor Hugo, Mikhail Lermontov, Saint-John Perse, Paul Éluard, and Jules Supervielle.

== Selected works ==
- Sprawa wyobraźni. Państwowy Instytut Wydawniczy. 1960.
- Poezja i niepoezja. 1967.
- Notatnik amerykański. Ludowa Spóldzelnia Wydawnicza. 1983. ISBN 978-83-205-3558-7.
- Przyszłość przeszłości: eseje. Dolnośląskie. 1996. ISBN 978-83-7023-495-9.
