= Filip Matwiejczuk =

Polish poet, playwright, editor, and literary critic (born 1996)

- Born: 1996; Mrągowo
- Citizenship: Polish
- Occupations: poet, playwright, literary critic

Filip Matwiejczuk (born 1996) is a poet, playwright, editor and literary critic.

== Biography ==
Born in Mrągowo, he studied Polish studies at the Jagiellonian University. He was a member of the editorial board of the magazine Papier w Dole. He published in the magazines Kontent, Wizje, Notatnik Literacki, Dwutygodnik, Stoner Polski, Mały Format, 8. Arkusz Odry and Nowa Orgia Myśli. He has published two poetry books. His drama Pleśń i keczup was published in the magazine Dialog. In 2024 he was published in the publishing catalogue of the Book Institute New Books From Poland. His texts have been translated into Ukrainian, Russian, English and Swedish language. He co-founded the noise duo Nudy. He lives in Warsaw.

== Poetry books ==
- Różaglon (2020)
- Pasożyt (2023)

== Accolades ==
- Krakow UNESCO City of Literature Award (2020),
- honorable mention in the National Kazimiera Iłłakowiczówna Award for Różaglon (2020),
- 3rd place in the National Literary Competition “Golden Mean of Poetry” for Różaglon (2021).
