= Mucha (magazine) =

Defunct Polish satirical magazine

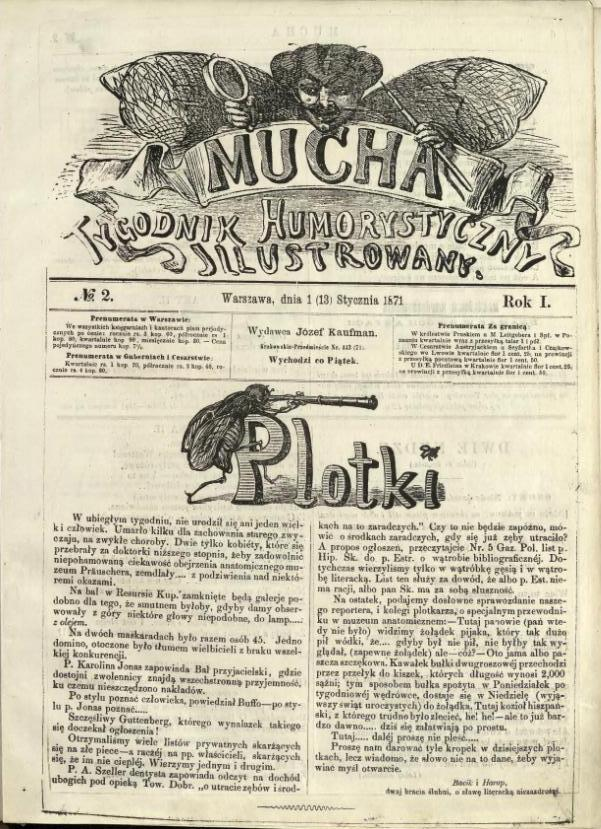
- Mucha's cover page from 1871
- Categories: Satire
- Format: Magazine
- Founder: Józef Kaufman
- Founded: 1868
- Final issue: 1952
- Country: Poland
- Based in: Warsaw
- Language: Polish

Mucha (Polish pronunciation: [ˈmu.xa]) was a Polish satirical magazine published in Warsaw in the periods 1868-1939 and 1946–1952. In 1953 it was merged into another satirical one, Szpilki.

== History ==
The magazine was founded and edited by bookseller Józef Kaufman, followed by other owners, including Feliks Fryze, Władysław Buchner, Bolesław Michalski, Antoni Orłowski and Ludwik Nawojewski. It included caricatures, jokes and humorous verses and short stories.

== Title ==
While mucha means "fly" in Polish, actually the magazine was named after a daredevil acrobat Antoni Mucha, whose caricatures were prominent in the first issues.

== Contributors ==
Among its many writers, editors, and illustrators were Franciszek Kostrzewski and Bolesław Prus, however the vast majority of contributions were anonymous.

== Content ==
The pre-1939 version was known for its right-wing, nationalistic, and xenophobic topics. The level of the humor was rather low; examples:

– Doctor, please help. My wife ate too much during the holiday and now it hurts her!
– Indeed?
– No, in the belly!
-
– Mr. advocate, sir, did you have happy holidays?
– They were happy for me, indeed: three cases of battery, two of insult, and three dozens of rejected promissory notes!
-
– Horror! Yesterday a young girl jumped from a bridge!
– Did she fall in love badly?
– No, in Vistula.

Scans of Mucha may be found in the searchable online library polona.pl.
