= Władysław Sebyła =

Polish poet (1902–1940)

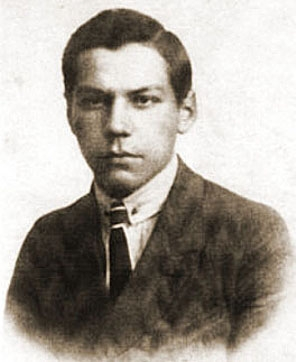
Władysław Sebyła

Władysław Sebyła (1902–1940) was a Polish poet, a member of the Kwadryga (Four-in-Hand) literary group, which also included Konstanty Ildefons Gałczyński and Stefan Flukowski. He is a victim of the Katyn massacre murdered in Kharkiv.

== Selected works ==
Poetry collections: "Modlitwa" ("Prayer"), "Pieśni Szczurołapa" ("The songs of Rat-catcher"), "Koncert Egotyczny" ("Egotic Concert").
