= Jerzy Zaruba =

Polish graphic artist (1891–1971)

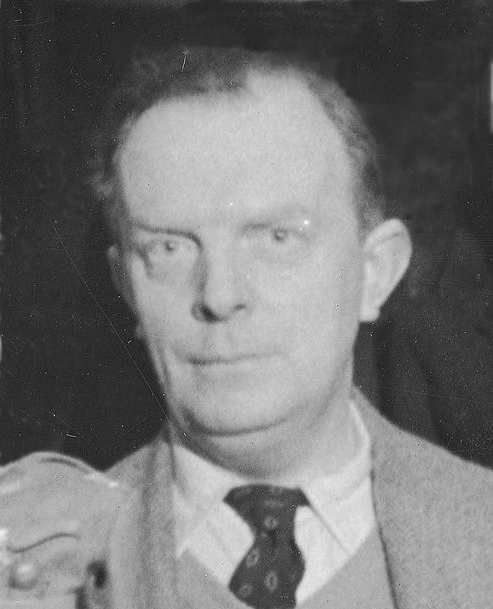
- Zaruba in 1938
- Born: 17 July 1891; Radom, Vistula Land, Russian Empire (now Poland)
- Died: 27 January 1971 (aged 79); Warsaw, Poland
- Known for: Sculptor

Jerzy Zaruba (17 July 1891 – 27 January 1971) was a Polish graphic artist, stage scenographer and caricaturist; author of satirical drawings, political crèches and illustrations for books and magazines. His work was part of the painting event in the art competition at the 1928 Summer Olympics.

== Biography ==
Jerzy Zaruba was born on 17 July 1891 in Radom, in Vistula Land (now Poland). He graduated from the Warsaw School of Art (Szkoła Sztuk Pięknych) and Académie des Beaux-Arts in Paris. As a caricaturist, he made his own debut in 1920 in Marchołt.

Zaruba was member of the group Formiści, co-founder of the Circle of Graphic Artists in Advertising (Koło Artystów Grafików Reklamowych), active member of the Polish Arts Club (Polski Klub Artystyczny), art director of Cyrulik Warszawski. He was awarded the Golden Pin with Laurel (Złota Szpilka z Wawrzynem), prize of weekly magazine Szpilka for achievements in the field of humour and satire, for the year 1966. He was also awarded the Knight's and Officer's Cross of Polonia Restituta.

As a medium innovator, Zaremba's image composition was influenced by cubism. He was an author of satirical drawings and caricatures of artists and politicians published in satirical press, including Marchołt, Sowizdrzał, Cyrulik Warszawski, Wiadomości Literackie, Szpilki. He also contributed to magazines Stańczyk, Szarża, Wróble na Dachu, Szczutek. He was the pupil of Stanisław Lentz.

He died on 21 January 1971 in Warsaw, Poland.

== Works ==
=== Books ===
- — (1954). Prawda w oczy kole. Karykatury (in Polish). Warsaw: Wydawnictwo Artystyczno-Graficzne RSW "Prasa". OCLC 76330560.
- — (1958). Z pamiętników bywalca (in Polish). Warsaw: Iskry. OCLC 12688399.
- — (1959). Patrząc na Warszawę (in Polish). Warsaw: Wydawnictwo Artystyczno-Graficzne RSW "Prasa". OCLC 27695935.
- Zaruba, Jerzy; Witz, Ignacy (1961). 50 lat karykatury polskiej, 1900–1950 (in Polish). Warsaw: Arkady. OCLC 7166896.

=== Illustrations ===
- Minkiewicz, Janusz; Brzechwa, Jan (1945). Szopka polityczna 1945/1946 (in Polish). Łódź: Czytelnik. OCLC 69452082.
- Minkiewicz, Janusz (1946). Kazania i skargi. Z rysunkami Jerzego Zaruby (in Polish). Warsaw: Czytelnik. OCLC 7222368.
- Marianowicz, Antoni (1950). Na wpół drwiąco (in Polish). Warsaw: Czytelnik. OCLC 69291199.
- Wiech (1953). Spokojna głowa (in Polish) (1st ed.). Warsaw: Czytelnik. OCLC 7266167.
- Wiech (1955). Szafa gra (in Polish). Warsaw: Czytelnik. OCLC 9513205.
