= Condetto Nénékhaly-Camara =

Guinean poet and playwright

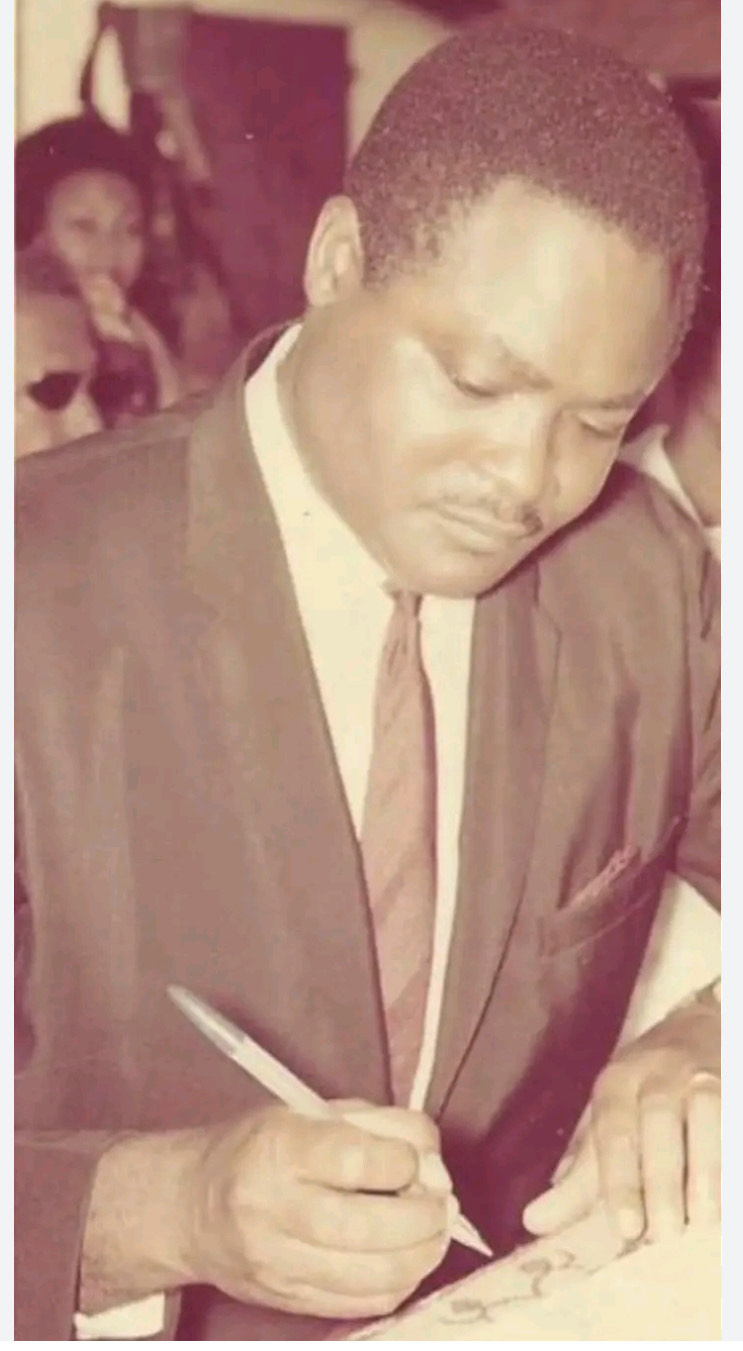
- Born: September 10, 1930; Beyla
- Died: July 22, 1972 (aged 41)
- Occupations: Playwright; Poet; Politician; Anthropologist; Minister

Condetto Nénékhaly-Camara (10 September 1930 – 22 July 1972) was a poet and playwright from Guinea.

Two plays by Nénékhaly-Camara, Continent Afrique and Amazoulou, were published in France in 1970, and translated into English in 1975. Amazoulou was an epic drama about the Zulu King Shaka.
