= Hwang Myung =

South Korean poet

- Born: November 20, 1931
- Died: 1998 (aged 66–67)
- Occupation: Poet
- Writing career
- Language: Korean
- Genre: Poetry

Hwang Myung (Korean: 황명; 1931–1998) was a Korean poet. His earlier poems, which date back to the 1950s, explored historical themes and the possibility of finding hope in a society laid waste and mired in despair in the aftermath of the Korean War. His later work branched out to encompass life through neutral depictions of objects and nature.

== Life ==
Hwang was born in Changnyeong, South Gyeongsang Province in 1931. He studied Korean Language and Literature at university. He debuted in 1955 when his poem "Bunsu (분수 Fountain)" was selected for publication in the Dong-a Ilbo. From 1960 to 1992 he was a teacher at Whimoon High School in Seoul. He was on the Executive Board of the PEN Korean Center, and was President of the Board of the Korean Writers' Association. He had a special attachment to Bucheon, having spent his adolescence as well as his first writing days there, and after his death a monument inscribed with his poetry was elected in his memory in Bucheon in 1998.

== Writing ==
=== Earlier work ===
Hwang Myung's poetry that dates back to the 1950s stem from deep reflections about Korean contemporary history and in particular the Korean War. It was Hwang's belief at the time that as long as poetry was a crystallization of the people's language, it could not limit itself to sorrow, mourning, and despair. Through poems like "Bunsu" Hwang sought to recover and rekindle a sense of inner strength and hope for the Korean people and thus to rouse them out of despondency.

=== Later works ===
The development of Hwang's poetic landscape in his later work is very well represented in the posthumous collection Bunsu and Namok (분수와 나목 Fountain and Bare Tree, 1999). In this collection Hwang gives expression to everyday themes and landscapes in a voice of quiet observation and contemplation. He addresses the personal, the inner life, and the self rather than focusing on external circumstances or realities. At the same time he also explores the existential limits that confront human lives by training his poet's eyes on nature. He forgoes denying or rejecting outright these constraints and daily struggles and sufferings in favor of acceptance and acknowledgment, even affirmation. Hwang's understanding of the true meaning or principle of life is related to a gentle, moderate attitude that strives to embrace and comprehend wrongs. His later works are focused on attaining or getting closer to this truth via depictions of objects and of nature.

== Works ==
=== Poetry collections ===
Narara achimui saedeuriyeo (날아라 아침의 새들이여 Fly, Morning Birds), Yejeonsa, 1985.

Nuneun eonjena sumswineun byeolbit (눈은 언제나 숨쉬는 별빛 Snow Is the Breathing of Starlight), Maeul, 1993.

Bunsuwa Namok (분수와 나목 Fountain and Bare Tree), Saemi, 1999. (Posthumous collection)

=== Essay collection ===
Hantteut Press ed., Dokdo tongsin (독도통신: 작가 60인 독도 방문기 Dokdo Dispatch: Sixty Writers Visit the Island), Hantteut Press, 1996. (Co-author)

=== Compilation ===
Paul Verlaine, compiled, translated, and edited by Hwang Myung, Verlaine sijip (베를레느 시집 Poems by Verlaine), Samseongdang, 1975.

== Awards ==
1992 South Korean Order of Civil Merit, Seongnyu Medal.

1996 South Korean Order of Cultural Merit, Bogwan Medal.
