= Sapargali Begalin =

Kazakh poet and writer

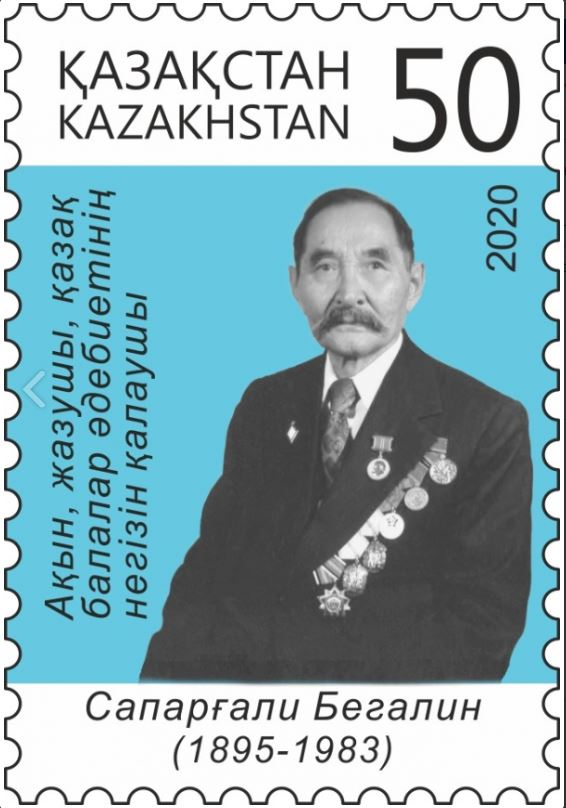
- Begalin on a 2020 Stamp of Kazakhstan
- Born: 24 November 1895; Russian Empire
- Died: 10 March 1983 (aged 87); Almaty, Kazakhstan
- Writing career
- Language: Russian

Sapargali Begalin (Kazakh: Saparǵalı Ysqaquly Begalın; 24 November 1895 – 10 March 1983) was a Kazakh poet. He also wrote a number of short stories.

His son Mazhit Begalin became a film actor and director.
