= List of Turkish Austrians =

This is a list of notable Turkish Austrians.

== Academia ==
- Ednan Aslan, Professor of Islamic Religious Education at the University of Vienna
- İlber Ortaylı, historian
- Niyazi Serdar Sarıçiftçi, physicist
- Hale Şahin, psychologist
- Nermin Abadan Unat, sociologist

== Arts and literature ==
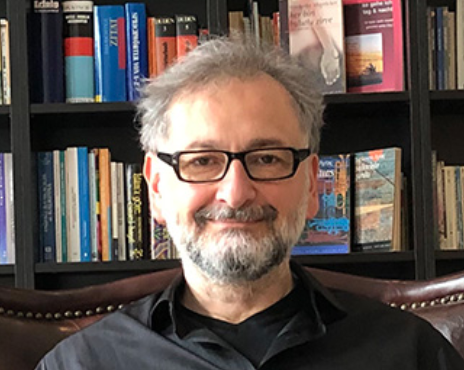
Ercüment Aytaç.

- Ercüment Aytaç, writer and author
- Şinasi Bozatlı, painter, sculptor and graphic artist
- Seher Çakır, poet
- Nilbar Gures, artist
- Kundeyt Şurdum, poet
- Esin Turan, painter and sculptor
- Ahmet Oran, Contemporary artist
- Şerafettin Yıldız, writer and translator
- Işın Önol, curator of contemporary art

== Business ==
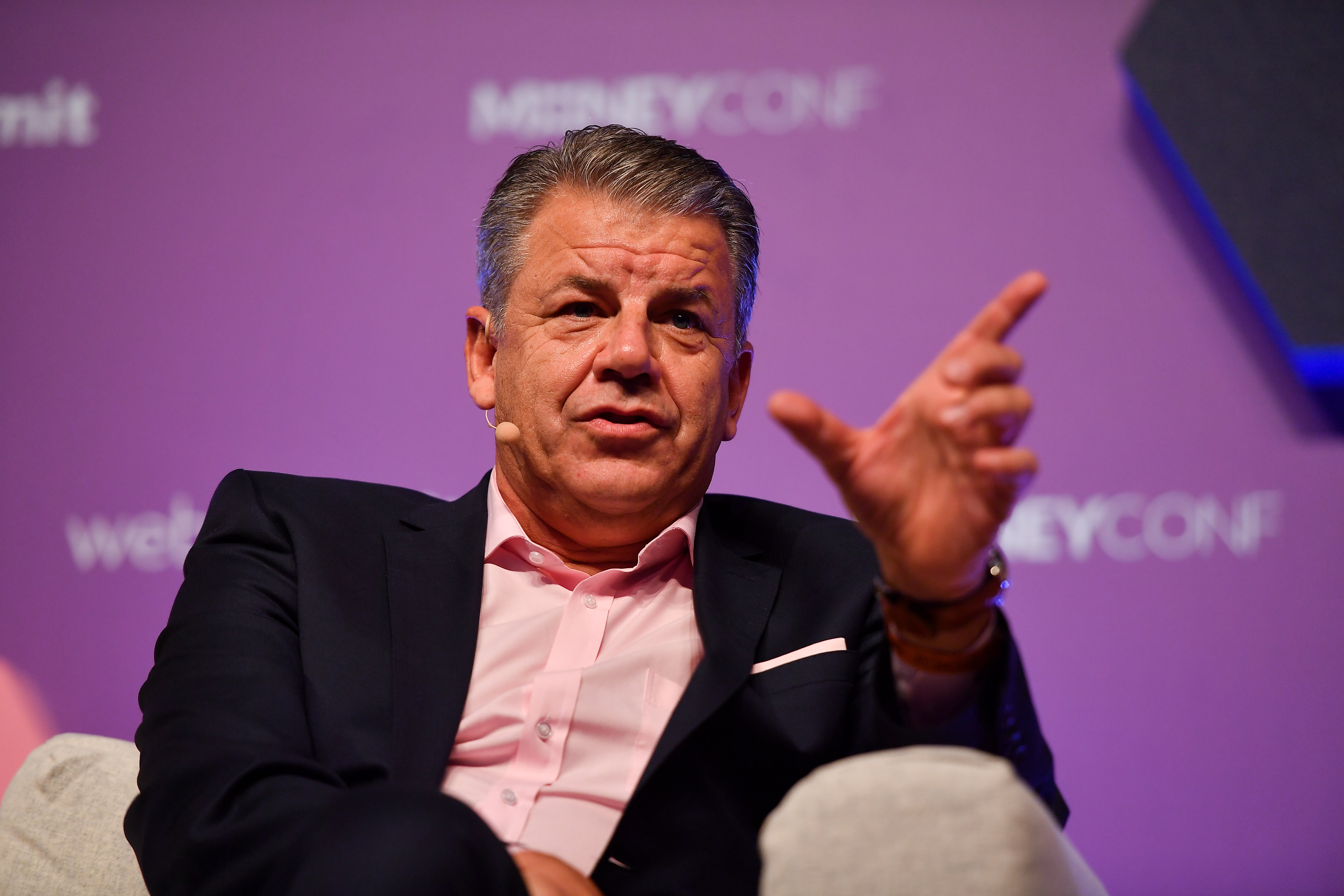
Hikmet Ersek.

- Attila Doğudan, founder of Do & Co
- Cevdet Caner, real estate entrepreneur.
- Hikmet Ersek, CEO of Western Union
- Birol Kilic, entrepreneur and the chairman of the Türkische Kulturgemeinde in Österreich

== Cinema and television ==
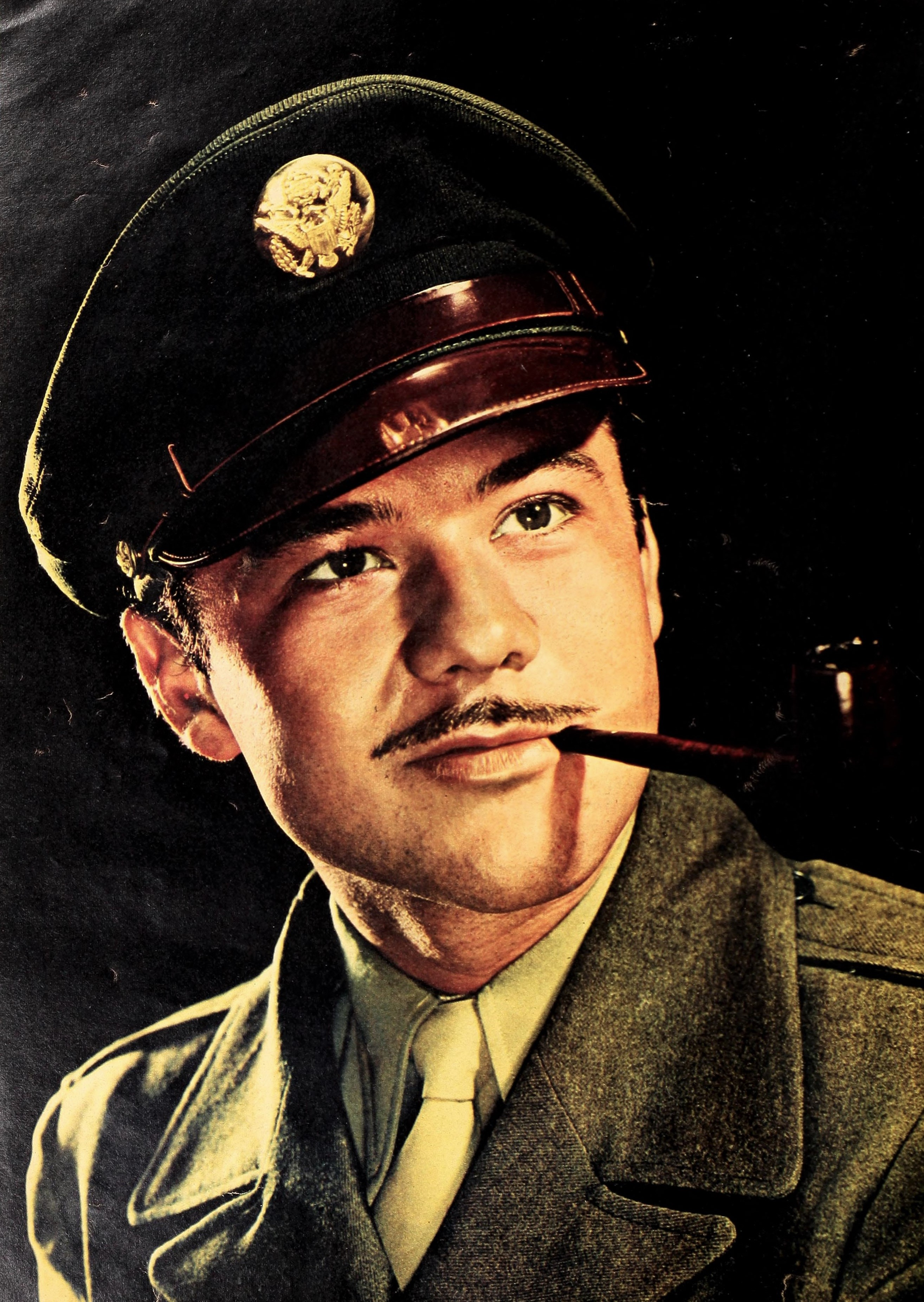
Turhan Bey.

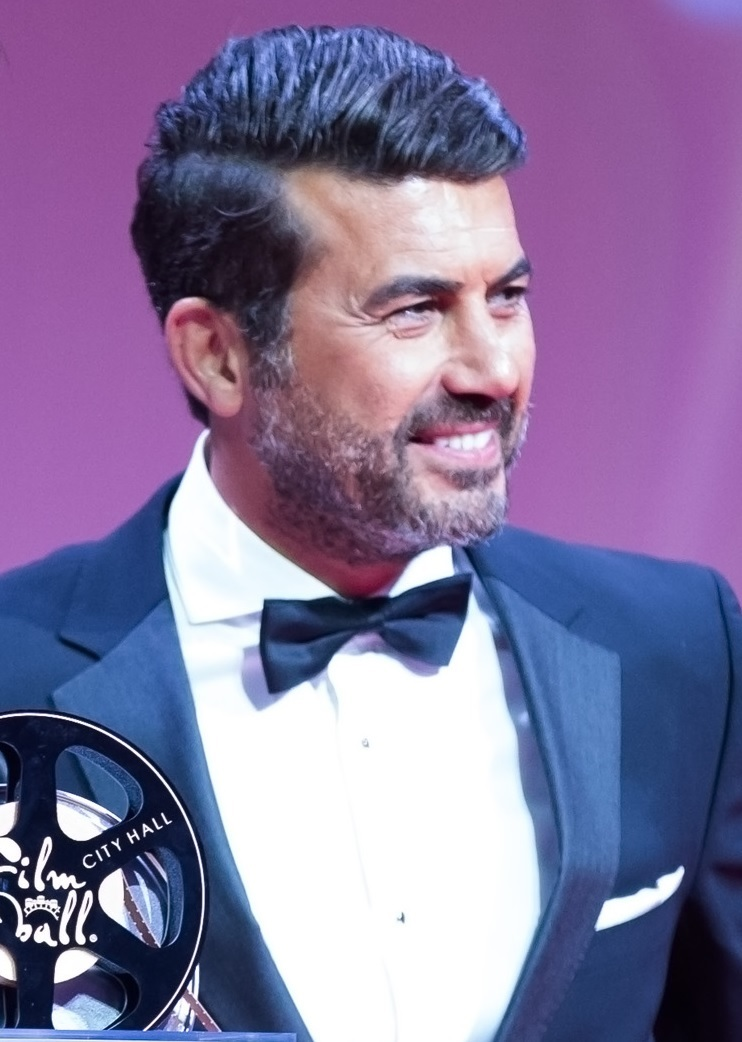
Oğuz Galeli.

- Ülkü Akbaba, actress and film director
- Turhan Bey, Hollywood actor
- Zeynep Buyraç, actress
- Deniz Cooper, actor
- Hamdi Döker, film producer
- Oğuz Galeli, actor and model
- Emel Heinreich, actress
- Münire Inam, TV presenter
- Alev Irmak, actress
- Adem Karaduman, actor and comedian
- Aylin Kösetürk, winner of the second season of Austria's Next Topmodel
- Murathan Muslu, actor
- Yelda Reynaud, actress
- Sonja Romei, actress
- Mehmet Sözer, actor
- Abdulkadir Tuncer, actor

== Fashion and design ==
- Atıl Kutoğlu, fashion designer

== Music ==
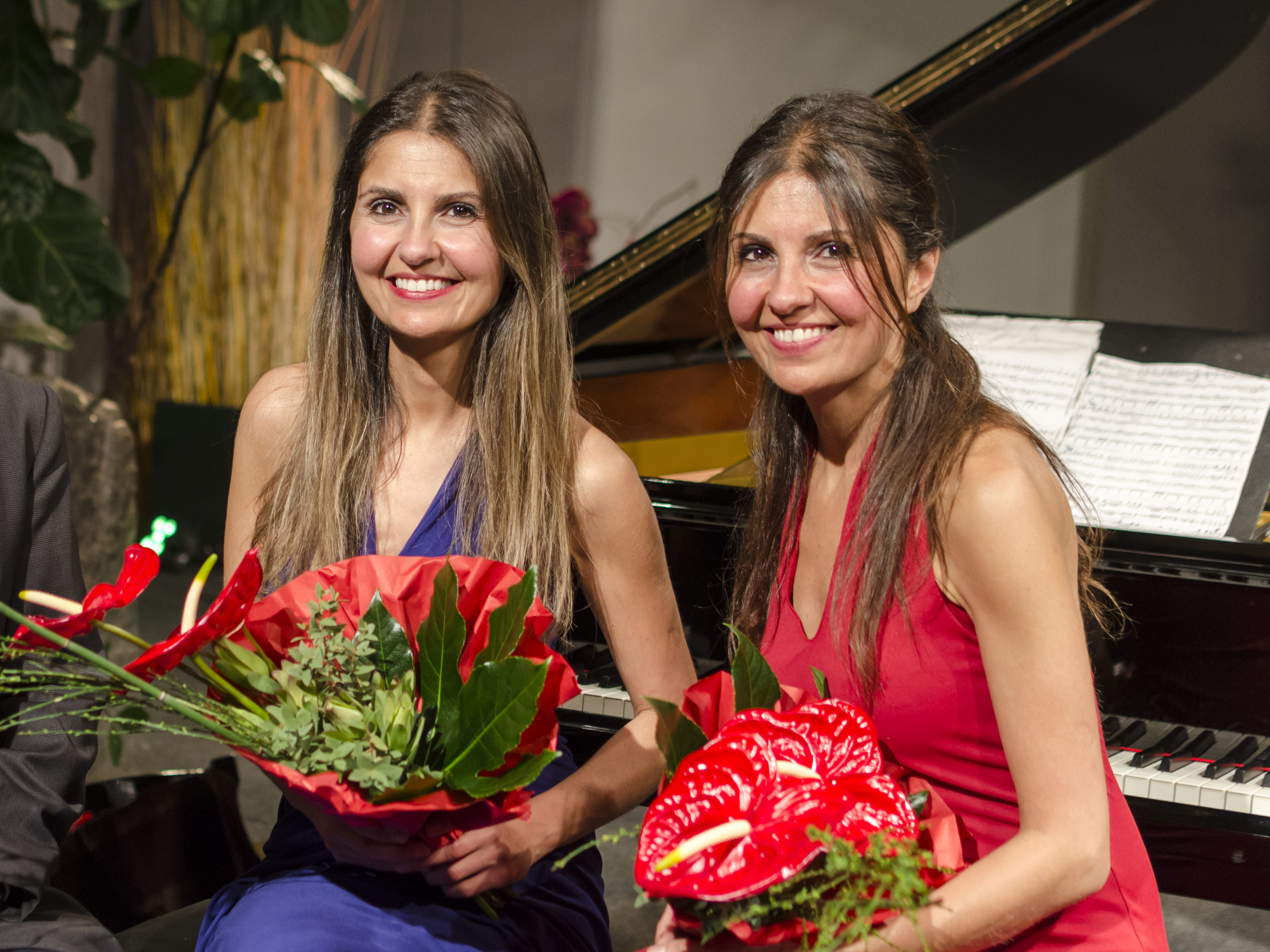
Önder Sisters, pianists.

- Ilker Arcayürek, opera singer
- Sera Gösch, opera singer
- Gülay Olt-Sahiner, singer
- Ferhan Önder, pianist
- Ferzan Önder, pianist
- Enes Özmen, from the duo hip-hop group EsRap
- Esra Özmen, from the duo hip-hop group EsRap
- Fatima Spar, jazz musician
- Erdem Tunakan, music producer and DJ

== Politics ==
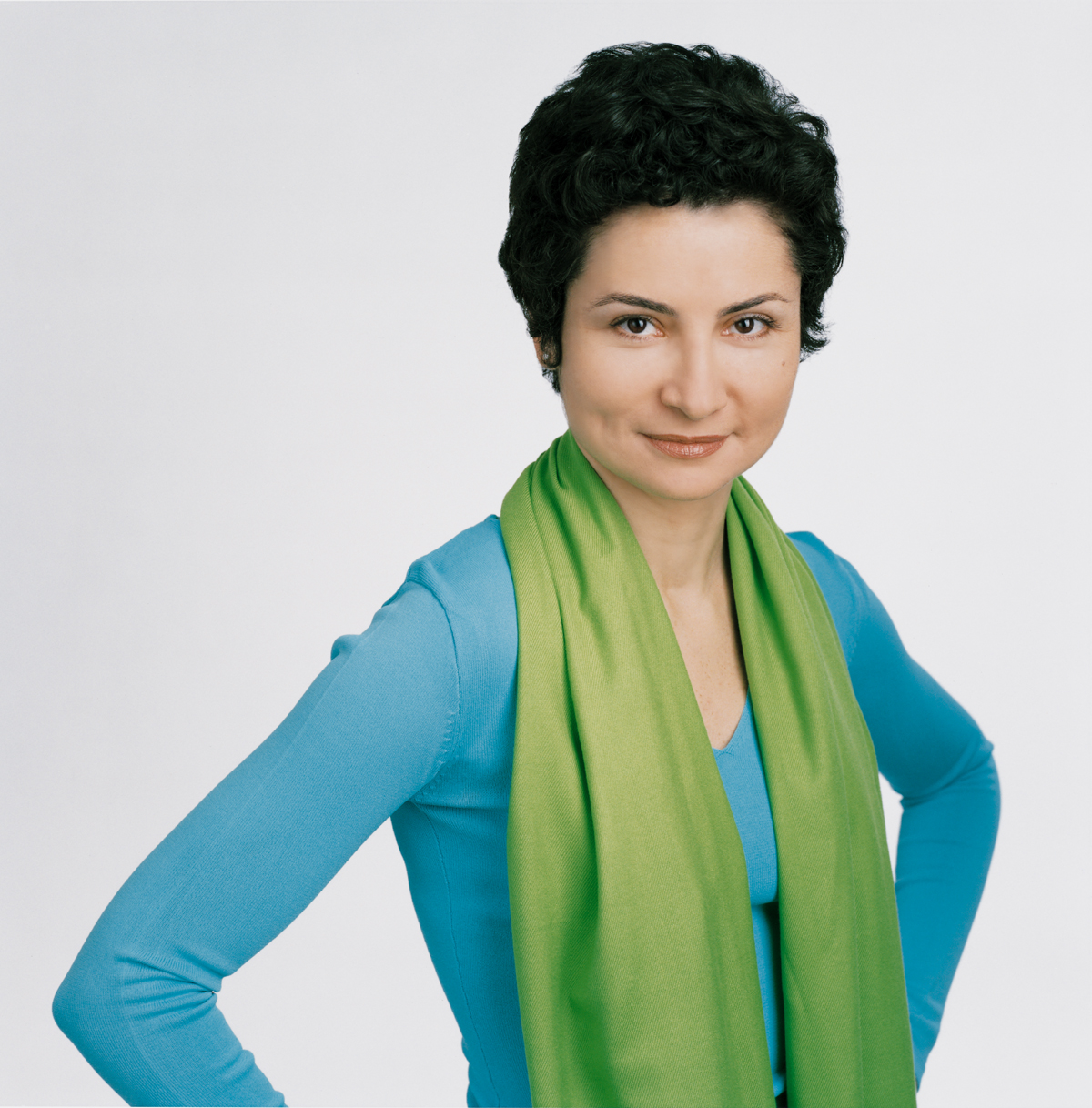
Alev Korun.

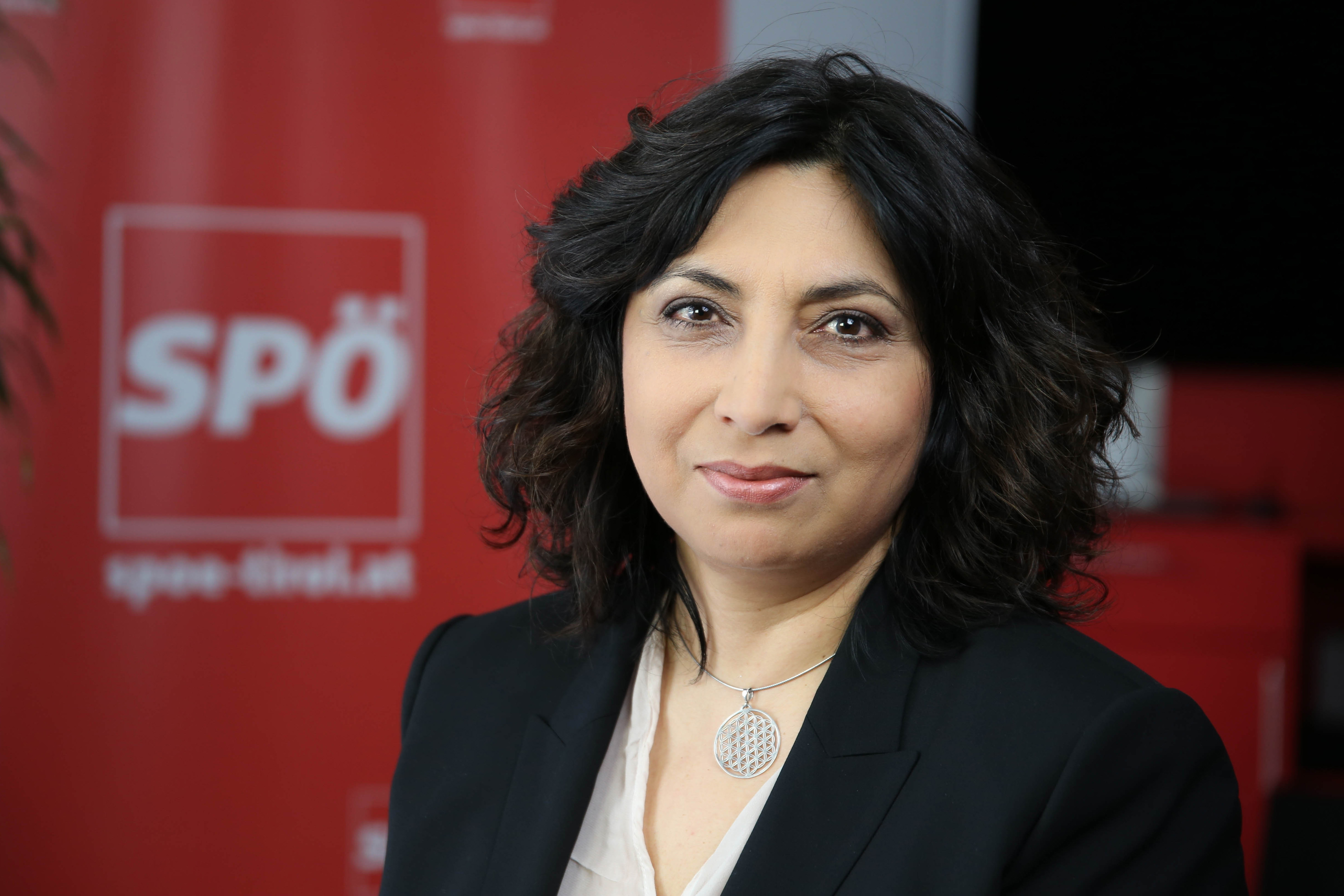
Selma Yildirim.

- Safak Akcay, member of the SPÖ
- Vahide Aydın, member and spokeswoman of the Green party
- Adnan Dinçer, leader of the Turkish-Austrian founded party New Movement for the Future
- Efgani Dönmez, former member of the Greens and the ÖVP
- Hakan Gördü, founder of the Soziales Österreich der Zukunft (SÖZ) Party
- Alev Korun, first Turkish congresswoman in the Austrian Parliament
- Tarik Mete, member of the SPÖ
- Mesut Onay, founding member of Alternative Liste Innsbruck
- Ömer Öztas, member of the Greens
- Turgay Taşkıran, founder of the Gemeinsam für Wien (GfW) Party
- Selma Yildirim, member of the National Council and deputy chairperson of the SPÖ
- Nurten Yılmaz, member of the SPÖ
- Süleyman Zorba, member of the Greens

== Religion ==
- Zeynep Elibol, director of the professionally-oriented Islamic college for social education in Vienna
- Ibrahim Olgun, former President of the Islamic Faith Community in Austria (2016–2018)
- Fuat Sanaç, former President of the Islamic Faith Community in Austria (2011–2016)

== Sports ==
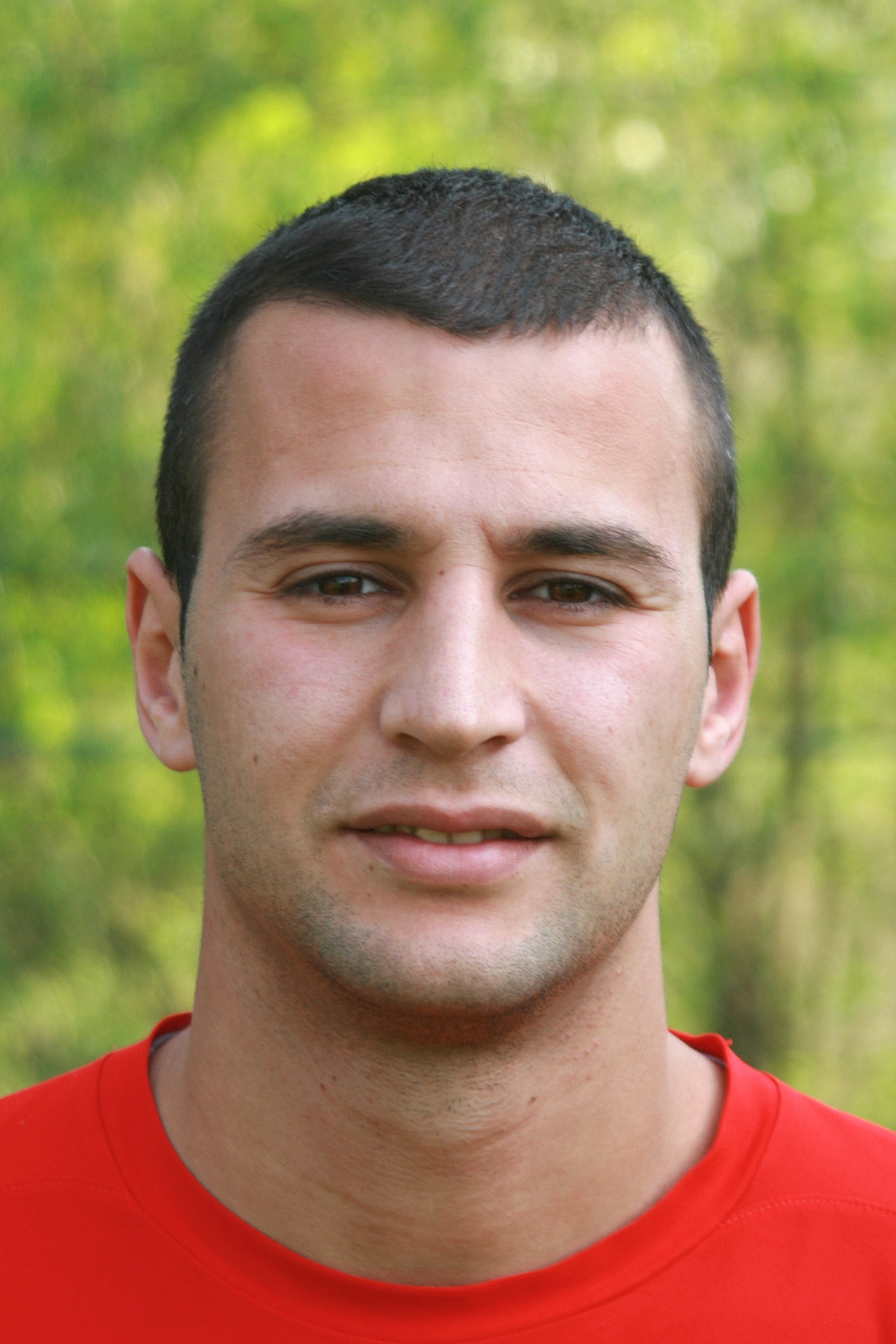
Cem Atan.

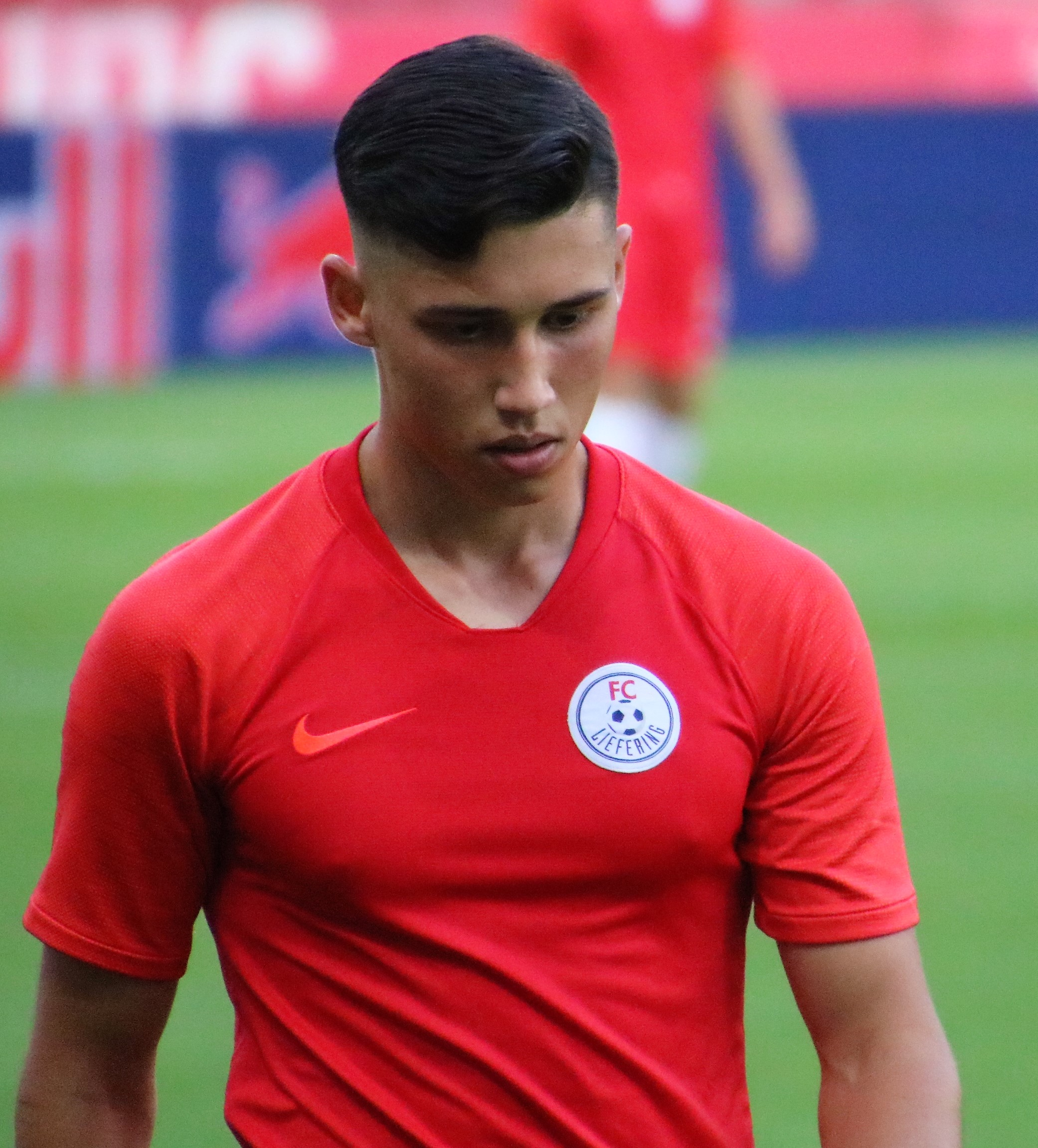
Ogulcan Bekar.

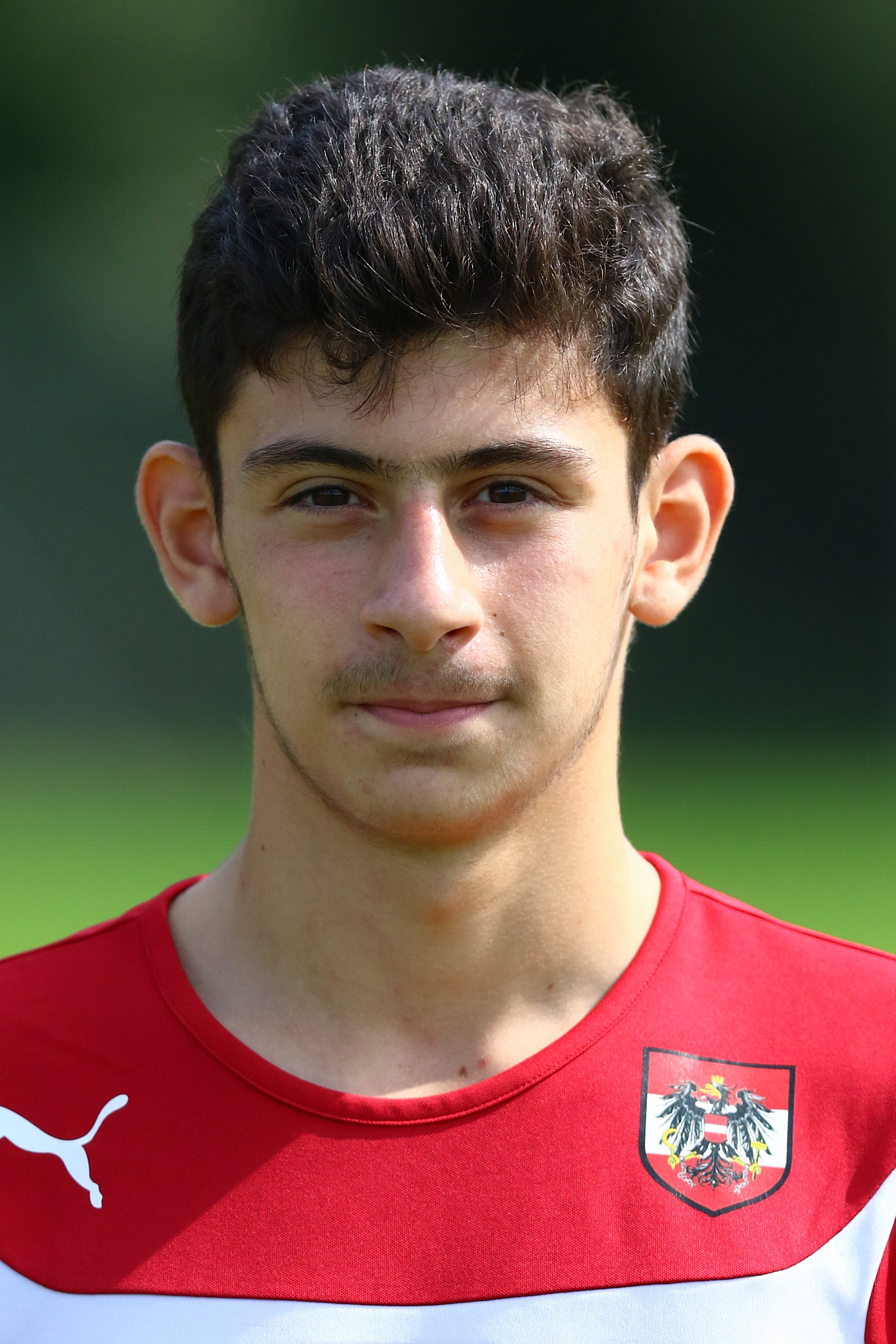
Yusuf Demir.

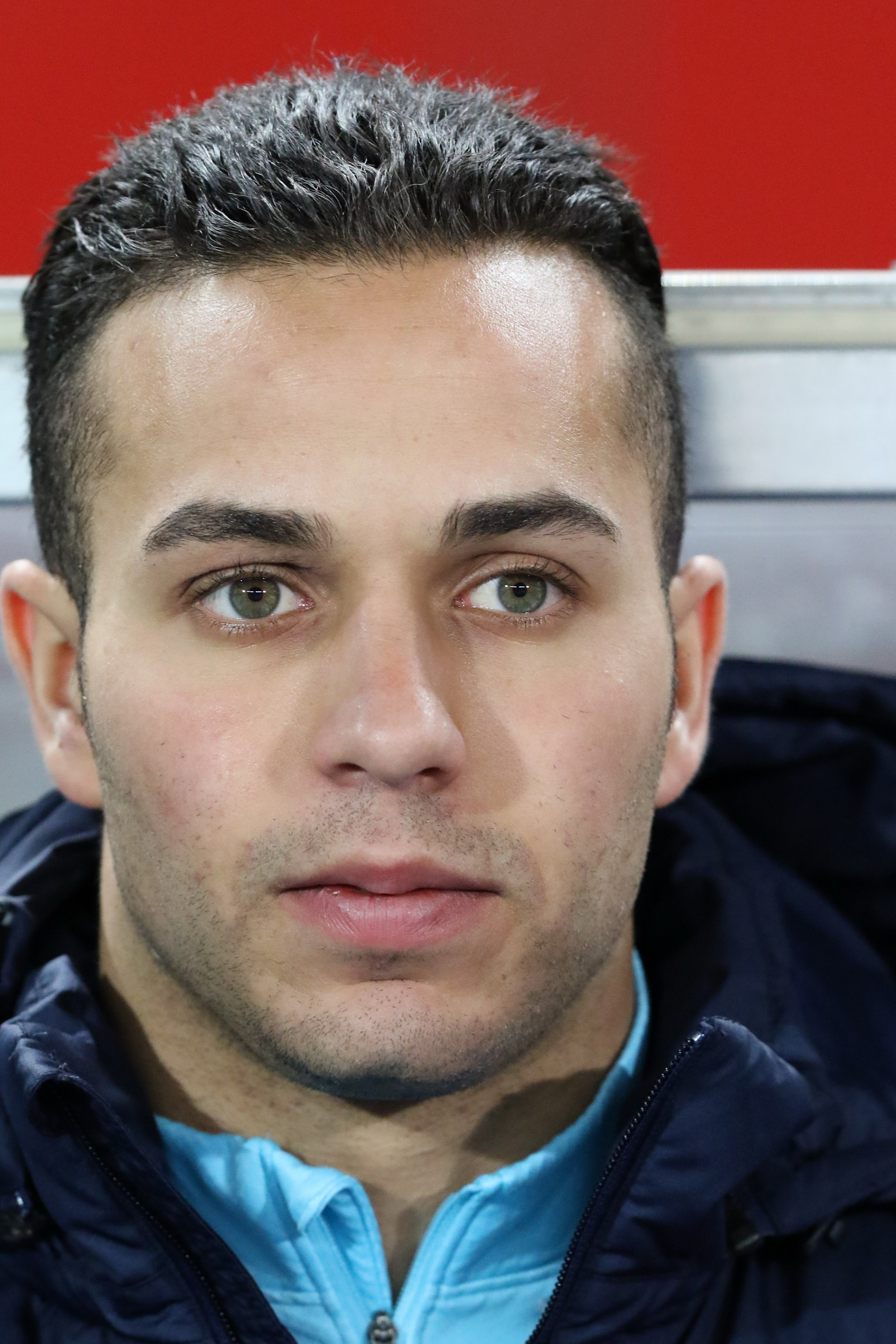
Kerim Frei.

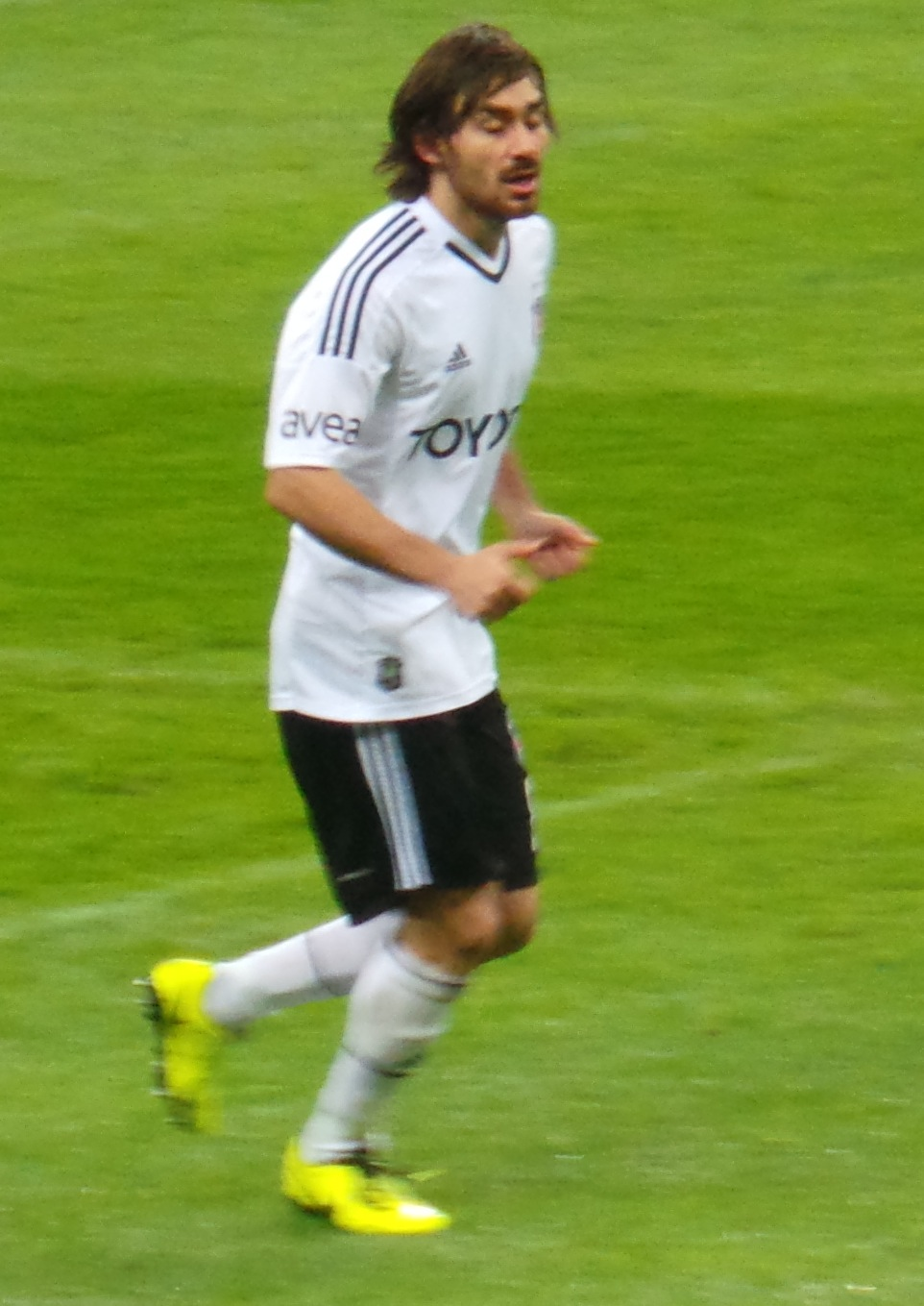
Veli Kavlak.

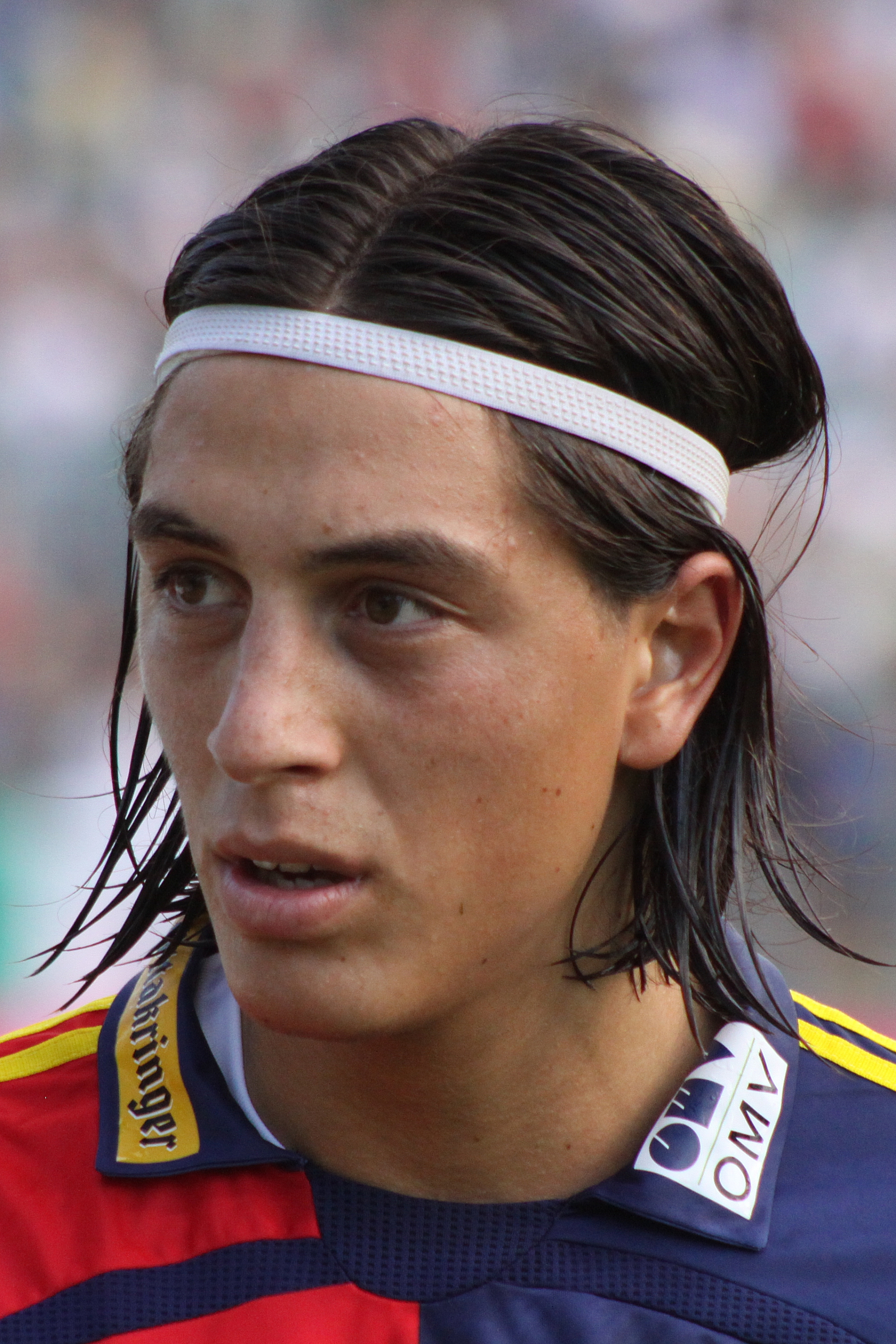
Yasin Pehlivan.

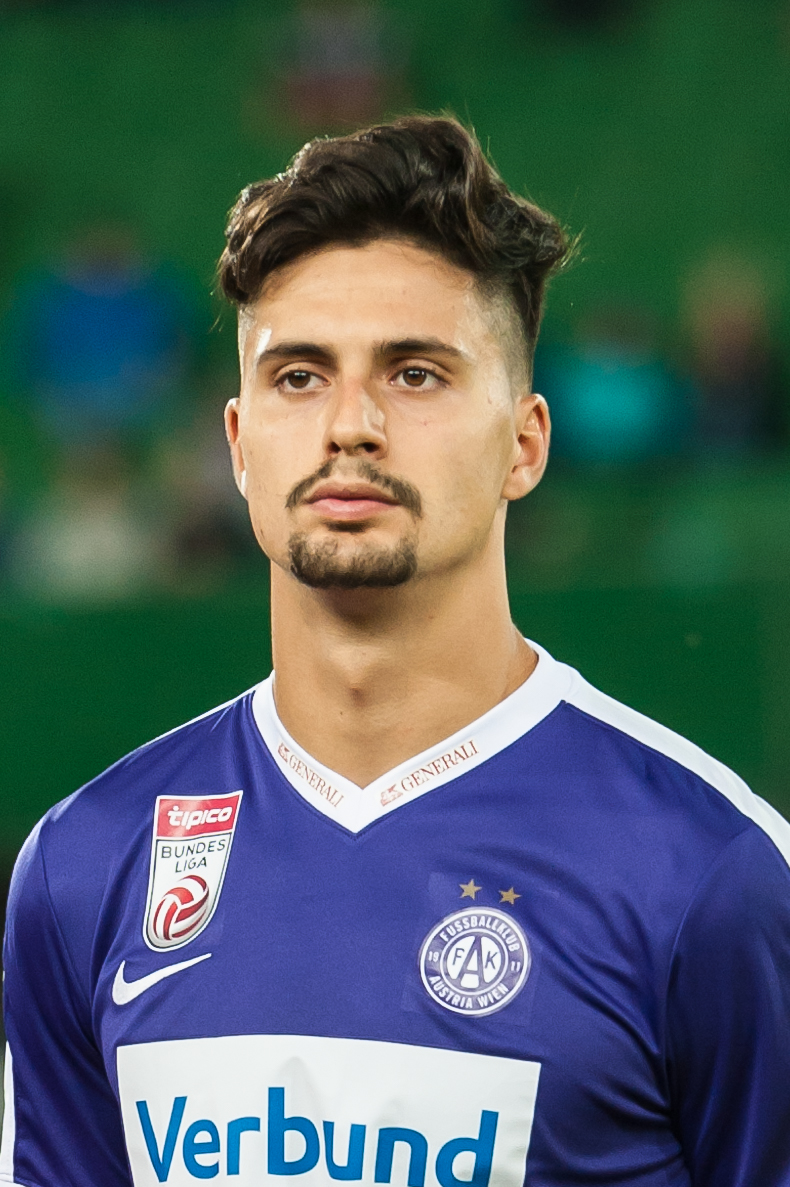
Tarkan Serbest.

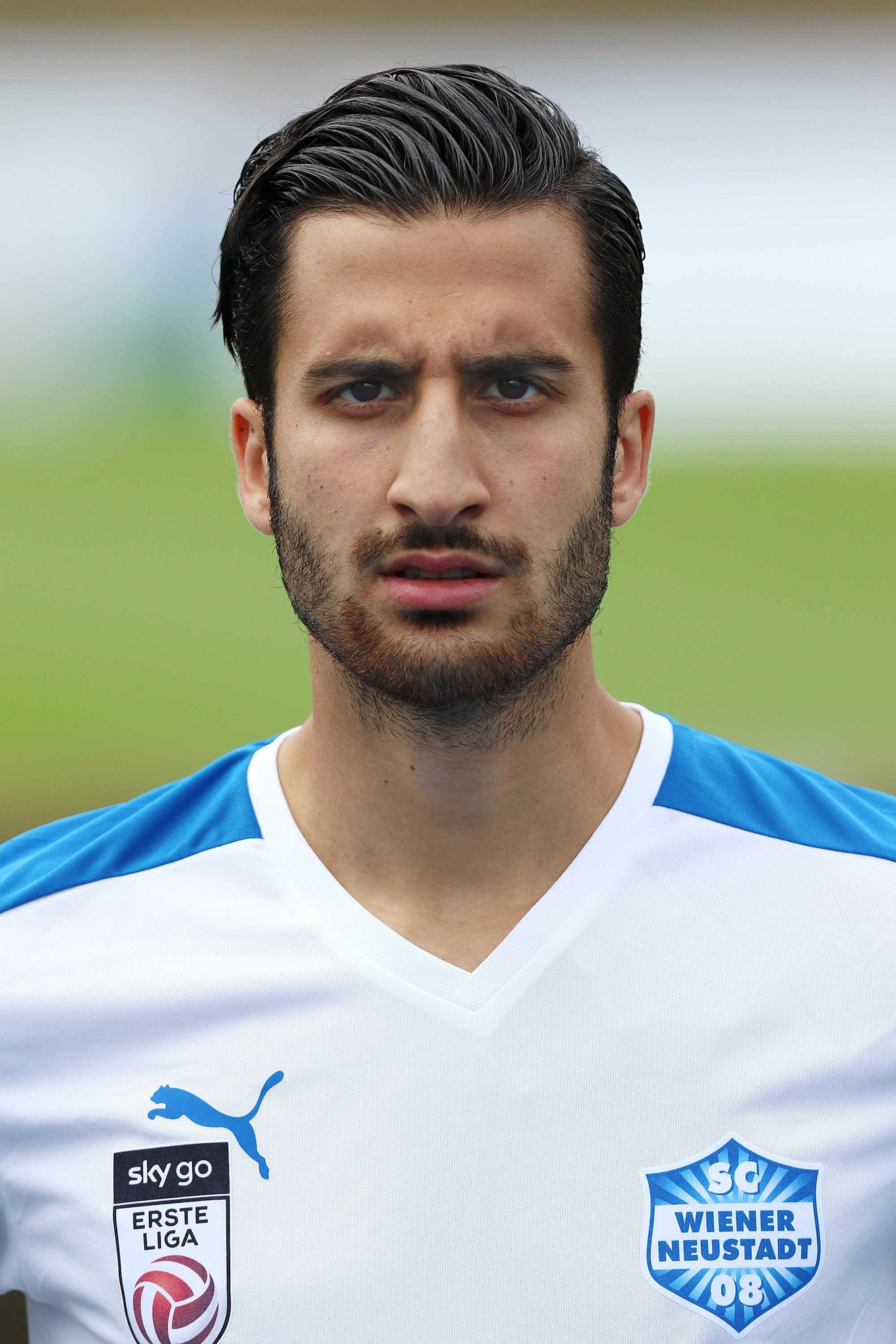
Mustafa Yavuz.

- Şefik Abalı, football player
- Muhammed Akagündüz, football player
- Volkan Akyıldız, football player
- Taner Ari, football player
- Ibo Aslan, professional mixed martial artist
- Metin Aslan, football player
- Cem Atan, football player
- Müslüm Atav, football player
- Furkan Aydogdu, football player
- Ilter Ayyildiz, football player
- Onurhan Babuscu, football player
- Turgay Bahadır, football player
- Abdullah Balıkçı, football player
- Ogulcan Bekar, football player
- Bülent Kaan Bilgen, football player
- Ibrahim Bingöl, football player
- Osman Bozkurt, football player
- Mehmet Bulut, football player
- Denizcan Cosgun, football player
- Tuncay Çalışkan, taekwondo practitioner
- Serkan Çiftçi, football player
- Ekrem Dağ, football player
- Mahmut Demir, football player
- Yusuf Demir, football player
- Mesut Doğan, futsal player
- Harun Erbek, football player
- Kerim Frei, football player
- Benjamin Fuchs, football player (Turkish mother and Austrian father)
- Hakan Gökçek, football player
- Kürsat Güclü, football player
- Sertan Günes, football player
- Ali Hamdemir, football player
- Tunç Hamarat, chess player
- Melih İbrahimoğlu, football player
- Ahmed Ildiz, football player
- Muhammed Ildiz, football player
- Mahmud Imamoglu, football player
- Volkan Kahraman, football player
- Ercan Kara, football player
- Dursun Karatay, football player
- Veli Kavlak, football player
- Coşkun Kayhan, football player
- Tanju Kayhan, football player
- Can Keles, football player
- Eren Keles, football player
- Kenan Kirim, football player
- Alfred König (1913-1987), Austrian-Turkish Olympic sprinter
- Ümit Korkmaz, football player
- Mert Müldür, football player
- Sinan Neumaier-Süngüoglu, football player
- Ramazan Özcan, football player
- Yasin Pehlivan, football player
- İhsan Poyraz, football player
- Rıdvan Sağlam, football player
- Ali Sahintürk, football player
- Yüksel Sariyar, football player
- Murat Satin, football player
- Attila Sekerlioglu, football player
- Tarkan Serbest, football player
- Rifat Şen, football player
- Berkay Tanir, football player
- Dilan Yeşim Taşkın, women's football player
- Erkut Tekinsoy, football player
- Rami Tekir, football player
- Enes Tepecik, football player
- Murat Topal, futsal player
- Cem Tosun, football player
- Cemil Tosun, football player
- Ertan Uyanık, futsal player
- Bünyamin Uyanik, football player
- Gökhan Vuran, football player
- Mustafa Yavuz, football player
- Furkan Yigit, football player
- Burak Yilmaz, football player
- Burhan Yılmaz, football player
- Kubilay Yilmaz, football player
- Okan Yilmaz, football player

== See also ==
- Turks in Austria
- List of Austrians
