= Turks in Austria =

Ethnic group in Austria

Austrian Turks
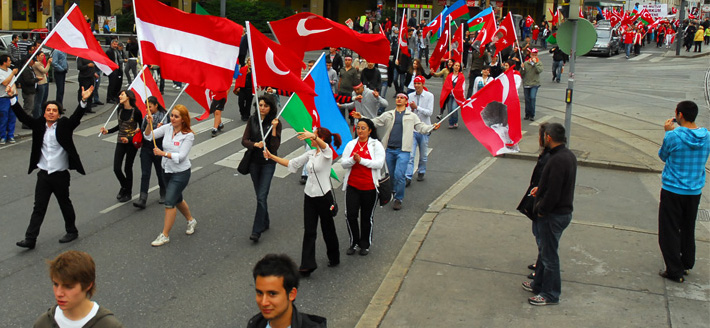
- Turkish day in Vienna, Austria (2009)

Total population
- Austrians of Turkish origin: 360,000 to over 500,000 (2010/11 estimates)

Regions with significant populations
- Burgenland; Carinthia; Lower Austria; Salzburg; Styria; Tyrol; Upper Austria; Vorarlberg; Vienna

Languages
- German; Turkish

Religion
- Predominantly Sunni Islam; Minority Alevism, Christianity, other religions, and irreligion

Turks in Austria, also referred to as Turkish Austrians and Austrian Turks (German: Türken in Österreich; Turkish: Avusturya'daki Türkler), are people of Turkish ethnicity living in Austria. They form the largest ethnic minority group in the country; thus, the Turks are the second largest ethnic group in Austria after the ethnic Austrian people. The majority of Austrian Turks descend from the Republic of Turkey; however, there has also been significant Turkish migration from other post-Ottoman countries including ethnic Turkish communities which have come to Austria from the Balkans (especially from Bulgaria, Greece, Kosovo, North Macedonia and Romania), the island of Cyprus, and more recently Iraq and Syria.

== History ==
=== Turkish migration from the Republic of Turkey ===
Turkish people were recruited to Austria as Gastarbeiter (guest workers) for the construction and export industries following an agreement with the Turkish government in 1964. From 1973 the policy of encouraging guest workers ended and restrictive immigration laws were introduced, first with the 1975 Aliens Employment Act, setting quotas on work permits, and then the 1992 Residence Act, which set quotas for residency permits without the right to work. A more restrictive system was put in place in 1997 and further limits imposed in 2006.

Since the 1970s Turks living and working in Austria have focused on family reunification and on seeking Austrian citizenship, for which they need to have lived in Austria for 10 years.

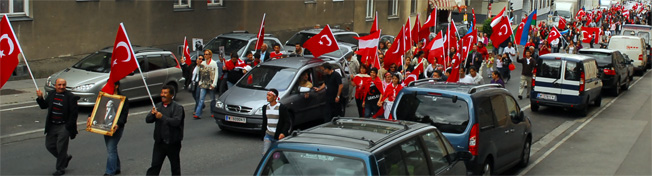
Turkish day in Vienna, Austria (2009).

=== Turkish migration from the Balkans ===
==== Bulgaria ====
Initially, Turkish Bulgarians came to Austria after fleeing the height of the Bulgarisation policies in the late 1980s, known as the so-called "Revival Process", when the communist ruler Todor Zivkov introduced an assimilation campaign in which Turks were forced to change their Turkish names for Bulgarian names, followed by the banning of the Turkish language and ethnic cleansing. Approximately 1,000 Turkish Bulgarians took refuge in Austria where they have since stayed permanently.

The social network of the first wave of political emigration of Turkish Bulgarians became the basis of labour migration to Western Europe after the collapse of the totalitarian regime in Bulgaria in late 1989. Thus, the preservation of kinship has opened an opportunity for many Turkish Bulgarian to continue to migrate to Western Europe, especially to Austria, Germany and Sweden.

More recently, once Bulgaria became a member of the European Union during the 2007 enlargement, the number of Turkish Bulgarian migrants in Austria increased further due to their freedom of movement rights as EU citizens. Thus, Turkish Bulgarian emigration to Austria in the twenty-first century has been dictated by the economic situation and the stagnation of the labour market in Bulgaria.

In the 2010s, the Turkish-dominated Movement for Rights and Freedoms political party in Bulgaria has been mobalising hundreds of Turkish Bulgarians in Austria, Germany and Spain.

==== Greece ====
The first mass migration of the Turkish minority of Western Thrace (located in Greece) to Austria began in the 1960s and intensified further between 1970-2010 due to political and economic reasons. In general, these migrants intended to return to Greece after working for a number of years; however, the Greek government used Article 19 of the 1955 Greek Constitution to strip members of the Turkish minority living abroad of their Greek citizenship. According to Article 19 of the Greek Constitution:

A person of non-Greek ethnic origin leaving Greece without the intention of returning may be declared as having lost Greek nationality.

A report published by the Human Rights Watch in 1990 confirmed that:

Under Article 19, ethnic Turks can be stripped of their citizenship by an administrative decree, without a hearing. According to the U.S. State Department's 1989 Country Report, under Greek law there can be no judicial review and there is no effective right of appeal.

Consequently, many ethnic Turks were forced to remain in the Western European countries they had settled in, which, in turn, also established the permanent Turkish Western Thracian community in Austria.

More recently, the second mass migration wave of ethnic Turks from Greece has been significantly larger in numbers, although it occurred only within eight years, between 2010–18, due to the Greek government-debt crisis.

==== Kosovo ====
Initially, Turkish Kosovars came to Austria when Kosovo was still part of Yugoslavia. The ethnic Turkish minority joined other Yugoslav citizens (i.e. Albanians, Bosnians, Serbs etc.) in migrating as "guest workers" in the 1960s and 1970s and then later brought their family members to Austria too. More recently, Kosovo Turks have also arrived as refugees during the Kosovo war (1998–99). The Turkish Kosovar community in Austria have been active in lobbying for the opening of more Turkish schools in the Balkans.

==== North Macedonia ====
The Turkish Macedonians first began to arrive in Austria as "guest workers" in the 1960s and 1970s alongside other citizens from Yugoslavia. Since North Macedonia gained independence in 1991, ethnic Turks have continued to migrate to Austria. In 2021, Furkan Çako, who is a former Macedonian minister and member of the Security Council, urged Turkish Macedonians living in Austria to participate in North Macedonia's 2021 census.

==== Romania ====
Since the beginning of the twenty-first century, there has been a significant decrease in the population of the Turkish Romanian minority group due to the admission of Romania into the European Union and the subsequent relaxation of the travelling and migration regulations. Hence, Turkish Romanians, especially from the Dobruja region, have joined other Romanian citizens (e.g. ethnic Romanians, Tatars, etc.) in migrating mostly to Germany, Austria, Italy, Spain and the UK.

=== Turkish migration from the Levant ===
==== Cyprus ====
The majority of the Turkish Cypriots left the island of Cyprus due to economic and political reasons in the 20th century. Traditionally, most who migrated to Western Europe settled in the United Kingdom, Germany, France, the Netherlands, and Austria. The majority of Turkish Cypriots in Austria arrived after 1974, following the coup d'état by the Greek military junta and then the reactionary Turkish invasion of the island. More recently, with the 2004 enlargement of the European Union, Turkish Cypriots have had the freedom of movement rights to live and work across the European Union, including in Austria, as EU citizens.

The TRNC provides assistance to its Turkish Cypriots residents living in Austria via TRNC Representative Office located in Gaming; in addition, the office promotes friendly relations between the TRNC and Austria, as well as economic and cultural relations.

==== Syria ====
Thousands of Syrian Turks, alongside ethnic Arabs, Syrian Kurds and other minority groups in Syria, fleeing the Syrian civil war, came to Austria during the European migrant crisis of 2014–19 as Syrian refugees. This mass migration accelerated on 4 September 2015, when Chancellor Werner Faymann of Austria, in conjunction with Chancellor Angela Merkel of Germany, announced that migrants would be allowed to cross the border from Hungary into Austria and Germany.

== Population ==
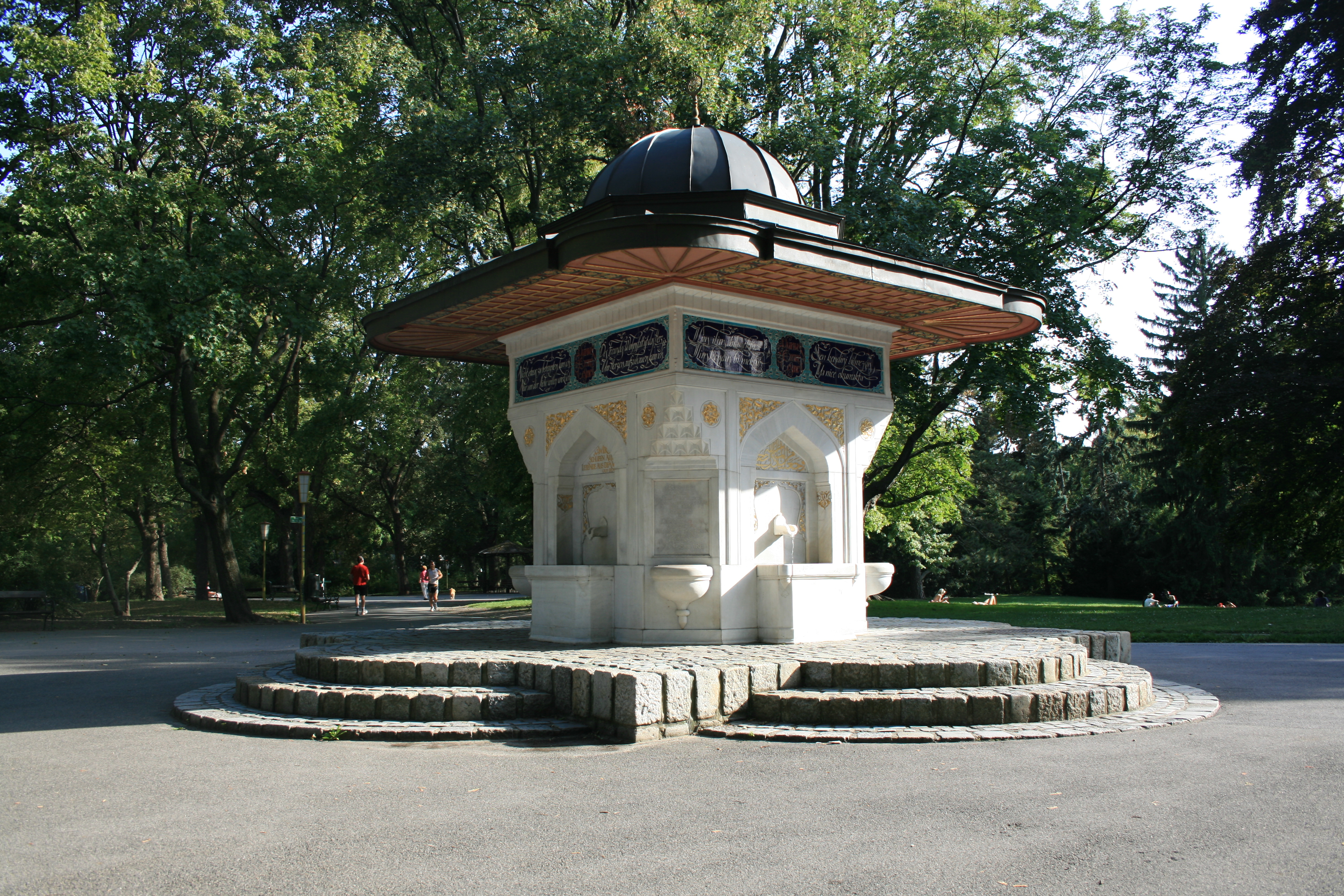
The Yunus-Emre-Fountain, located in the Türkenschanzpark ("Turkish Entrenchment Park"), Währing, was gifted to Austria by the Republic of Turkey in 1991.

The Turkish Austrian community is made up of ethnic Turkish people who have migrated from Turkey and their Austrian-born descendants as well as ethnic Turkish communities which originate from the Balkans (especially from Bulgaria, Greece and Romania) and the Levant (mainly from Cyprus and Syria). Consequently, official statistics published by the Austrian state does not provide a true reflection of people who self-identify fully, or partially, as Turkish because citizens in Austria are not given the opportunity to declare their ethnicity in official censuses.

In 2010 Ariel Muzicant said that the Turks in Austria already numbered 400,000. A report by the Initiative Minderheiten suggested a lower figure of 360,000 people of Turkish origin in 2011, which was also echoed by the former Austrian Foreign Minister and Chancellor of Austria Sebastian Kurz. Another estimate by the former Austrian MEP, Andreas Mölzer, has claimed that there are 500,000 Turks in the country. Similarly, a report by The Guardian in 2011 said that the Turkish community in Austria outnumbers the 500,000 British Turks.

In 2015, the Armenian ambassador to Austria, Arman Kirakossian, also said that there was "a 500,000-strong Turkish population in Austria".

=== Settlements ===
The Turkish Austrian community live throughout the big cities such as Vienna and Salzburg. In addition, there are large communities in smaller towns; for example, in the market town of Telfs the Turkish community form approximately 20% of the population.

== Politics ==
In the 2020 Viennese state election, According to analysis published by the OGM Institute, 20% of voters of Turkish immigrant background voted for Social Austria of the Future (SÖZ), making it the second-most popular party among this demographic. SÖZ, a minor party representing immigrant interests, won just 1.2% of the vote overall. The Social Democratic Party of Austria SPÖ also performed better among Turkish immigrants than the overall electorate, with all other parties performing worse, particularly the ÖVP (10%) and Greens (9%).

== Notable people ==
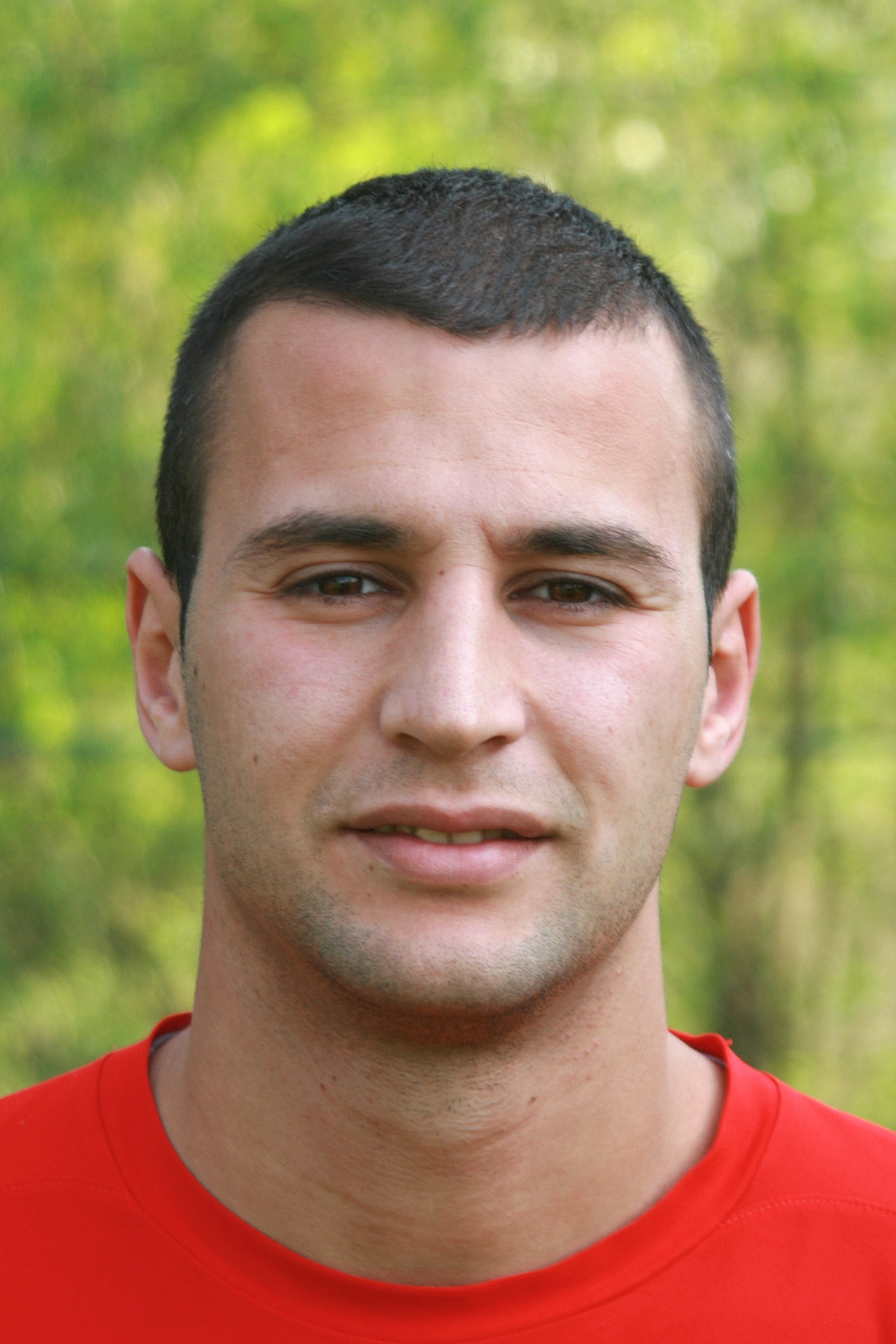
Cem Atan, football player

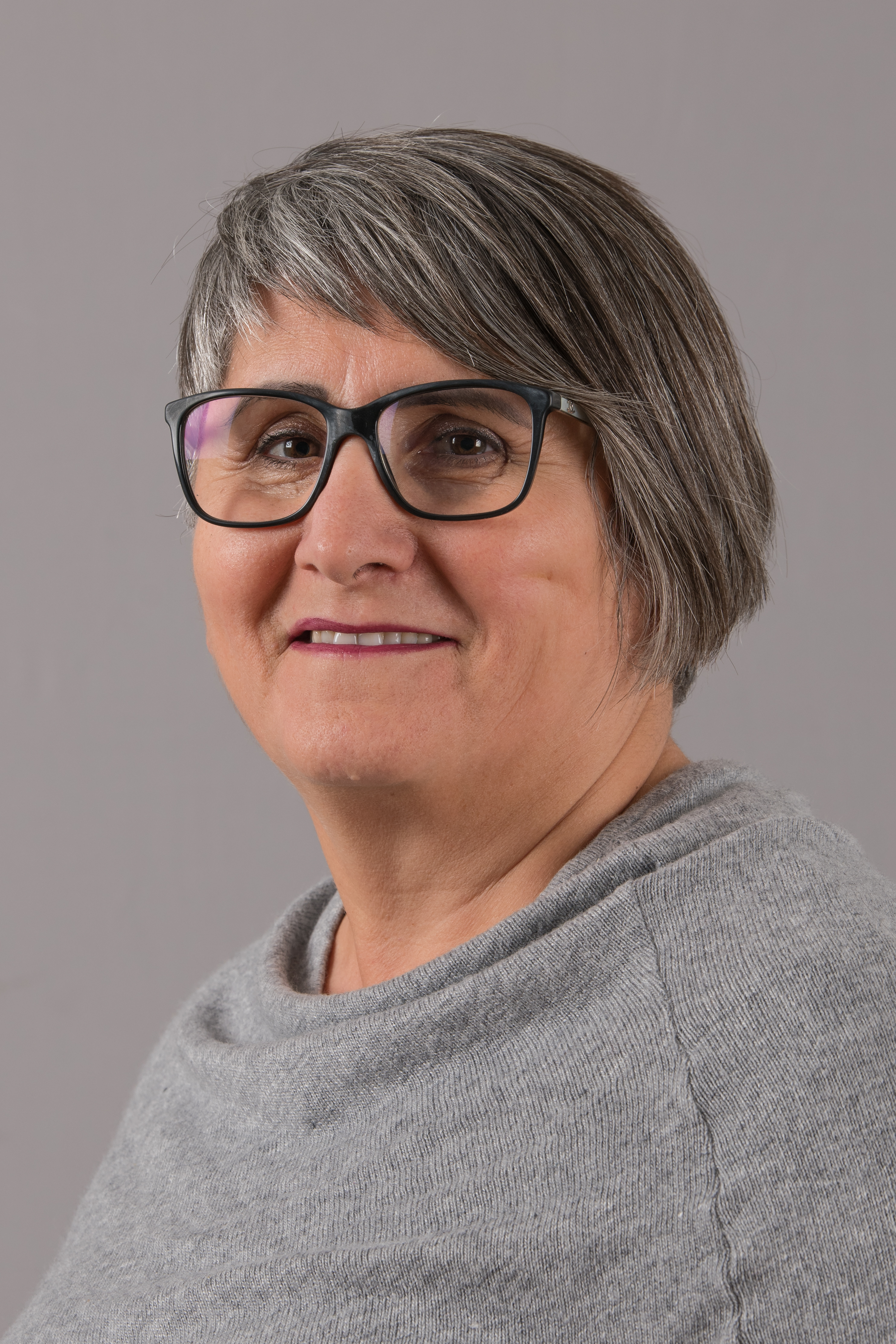
Vahide Aydın, politician

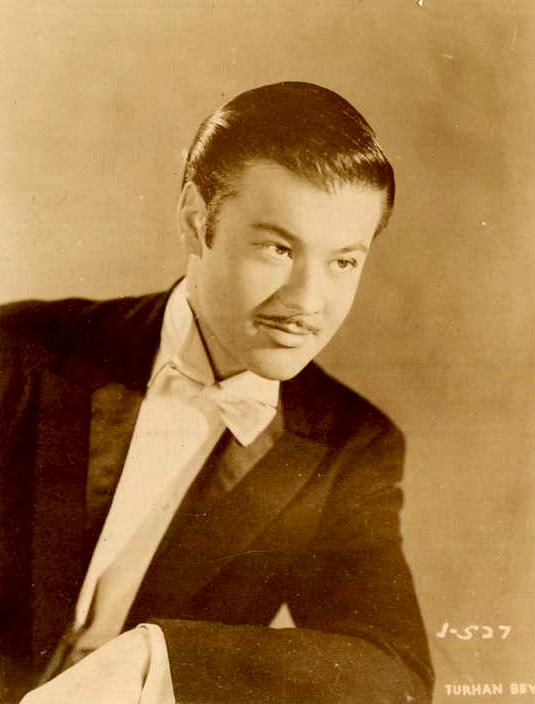
Turhan Bey, actor

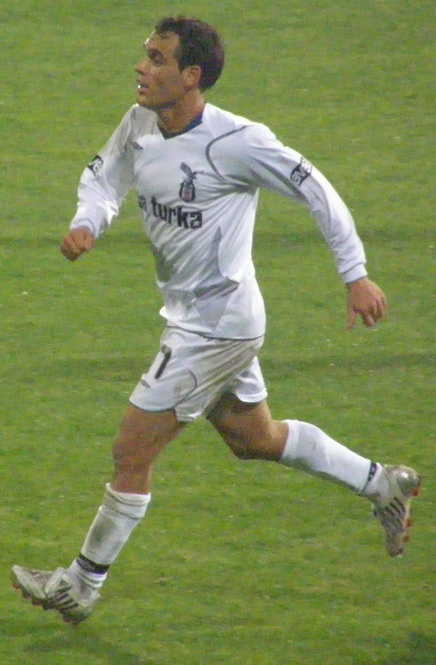
Ekrem Dağ, football player

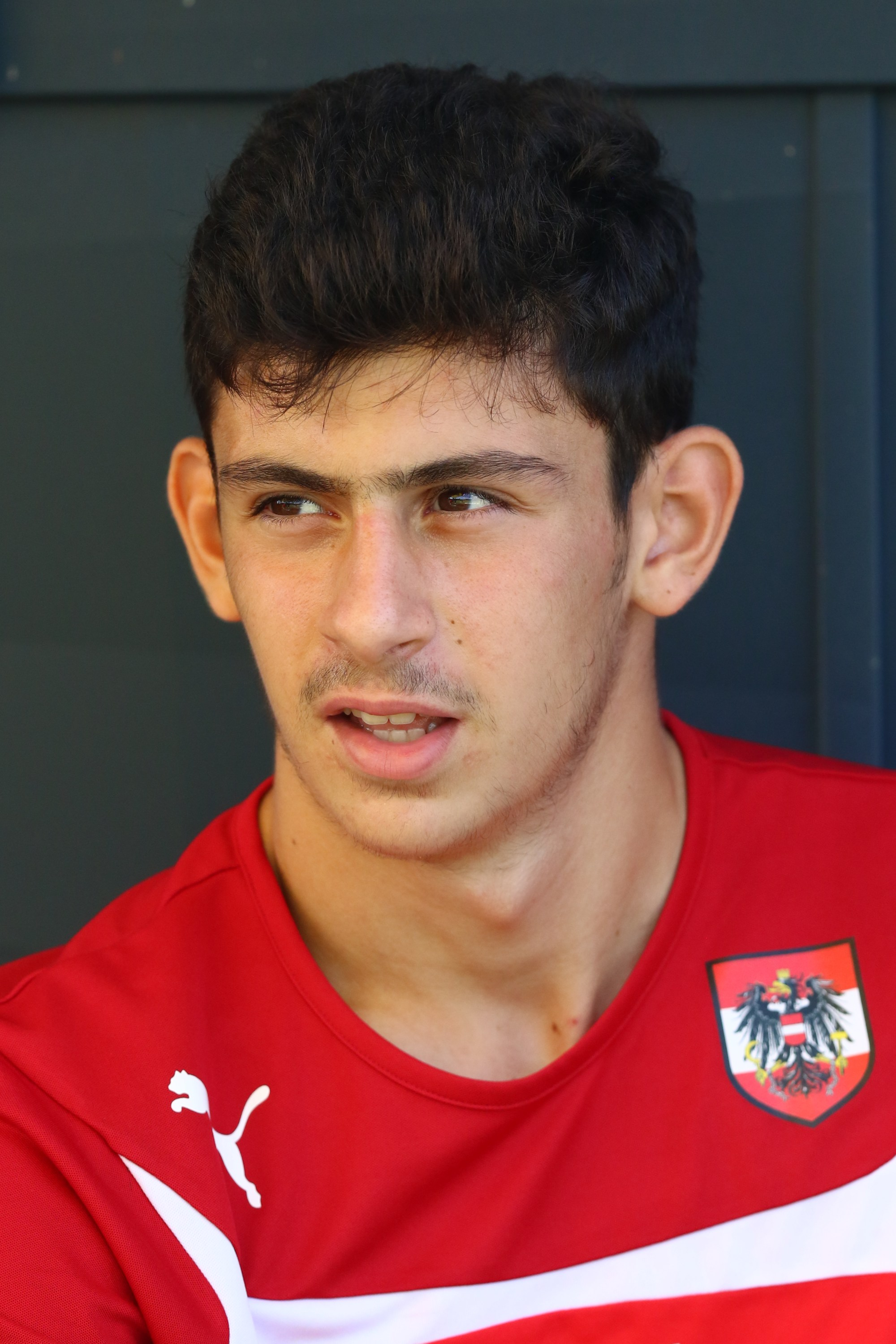
Yusuf Demir, football player

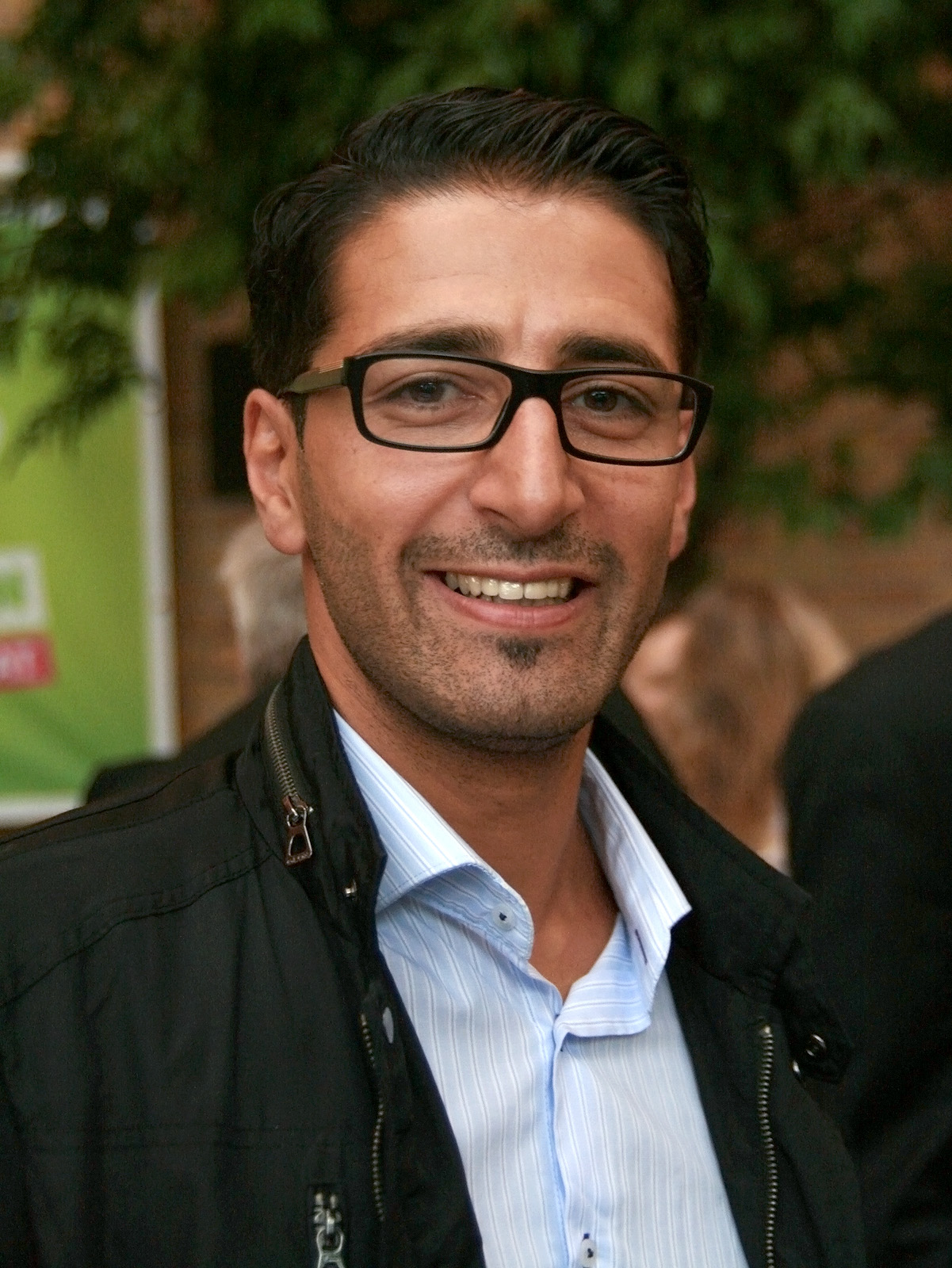
Efgani Dönmez, politician

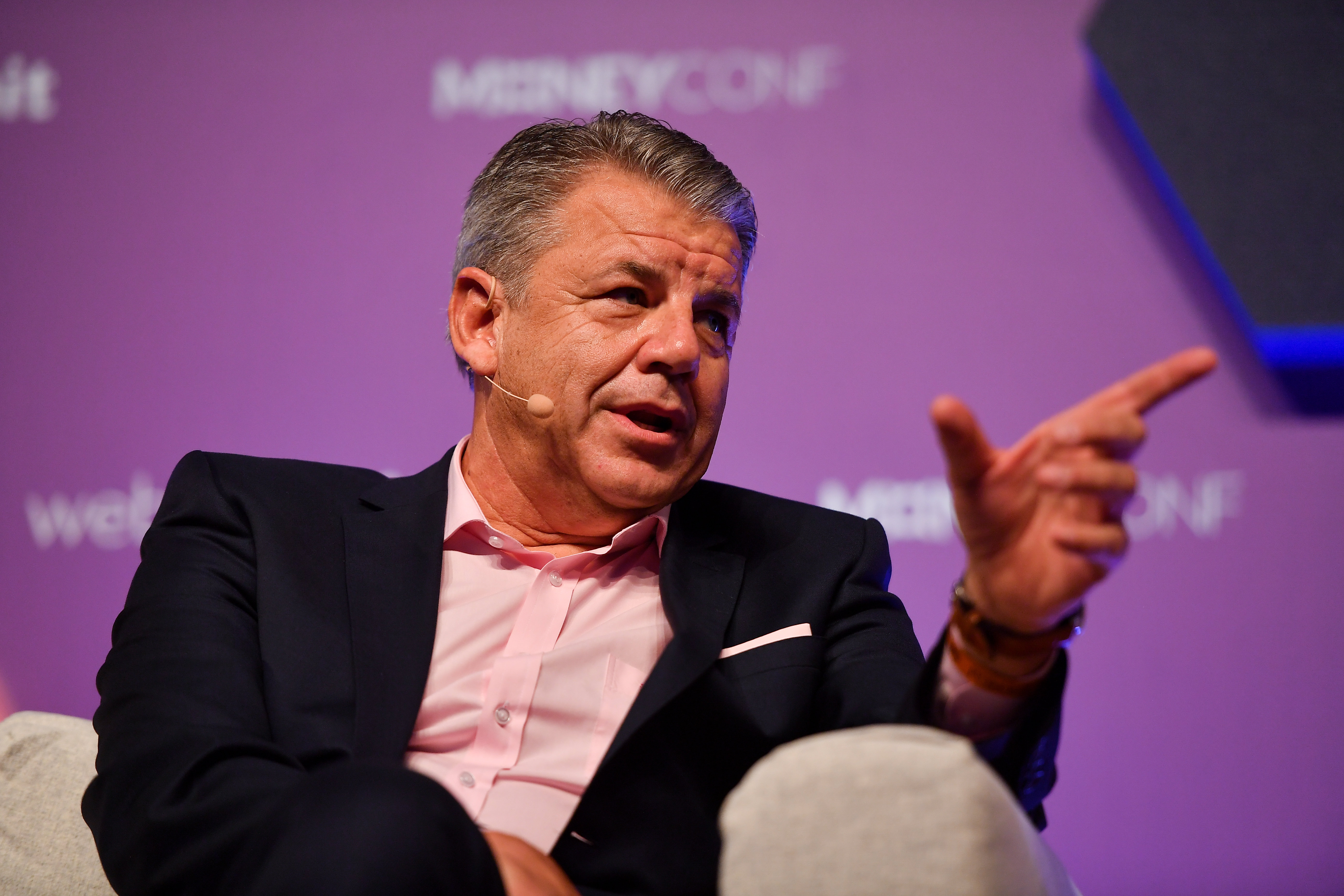
Hikmet Ersek, CEO of Western Union

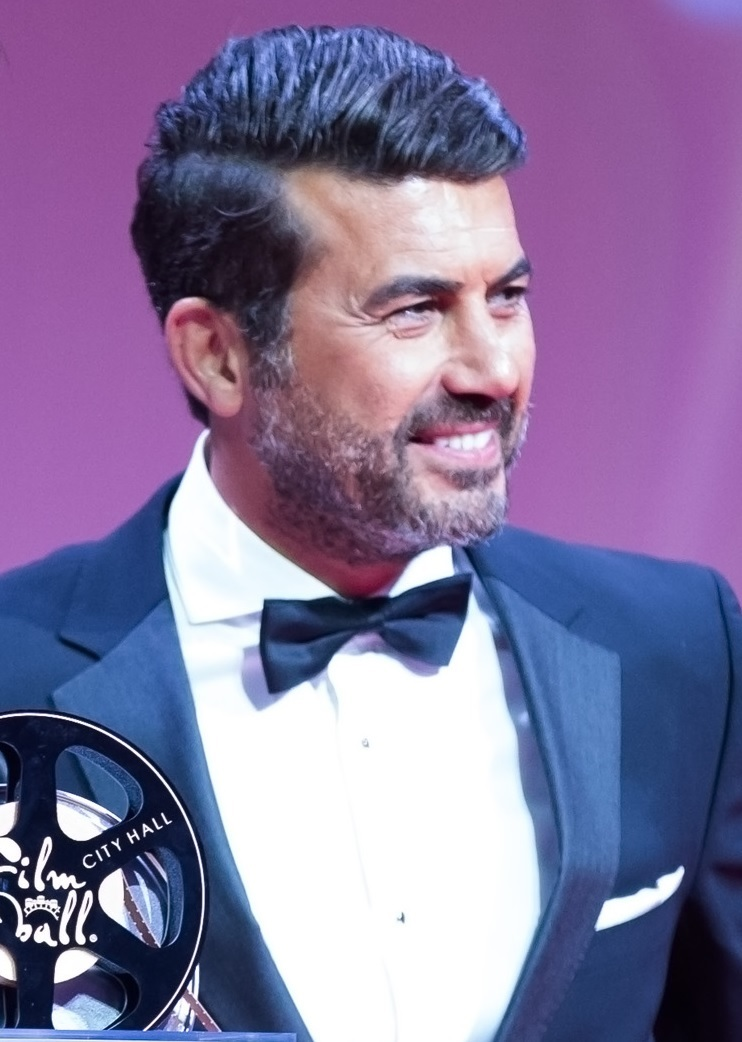
Oğuz Galeli, actor

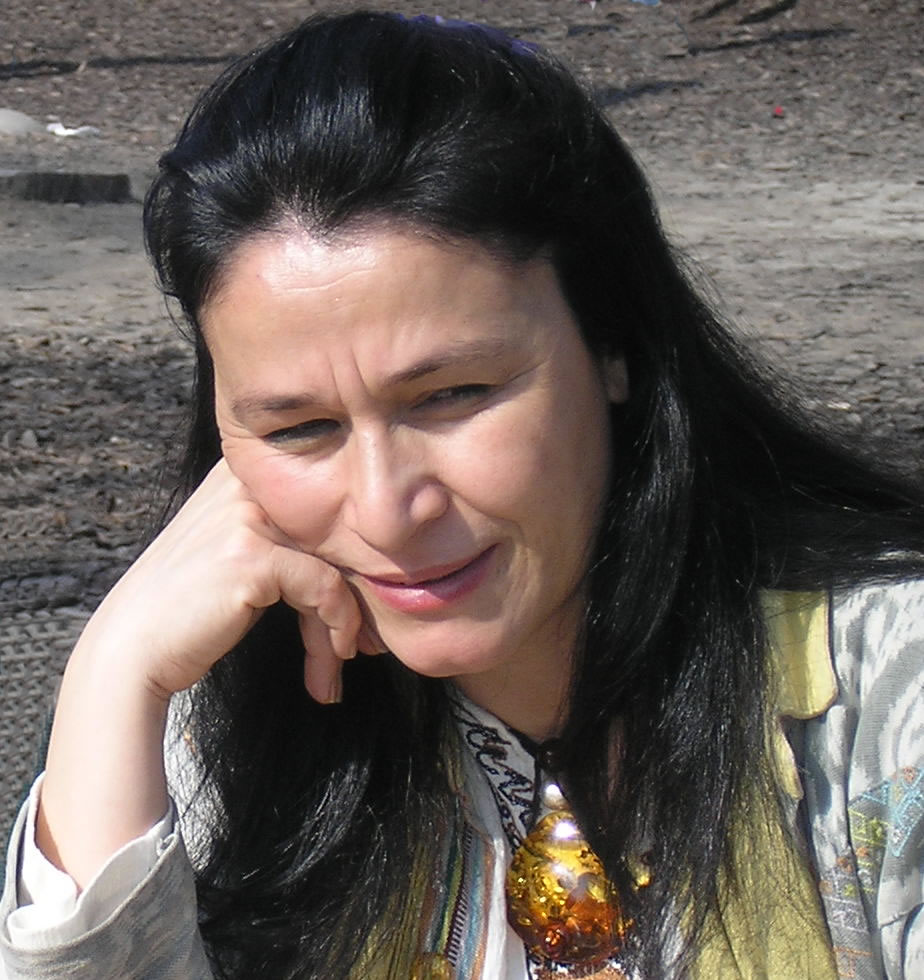
Emel Heinreich, actress, author and film-director

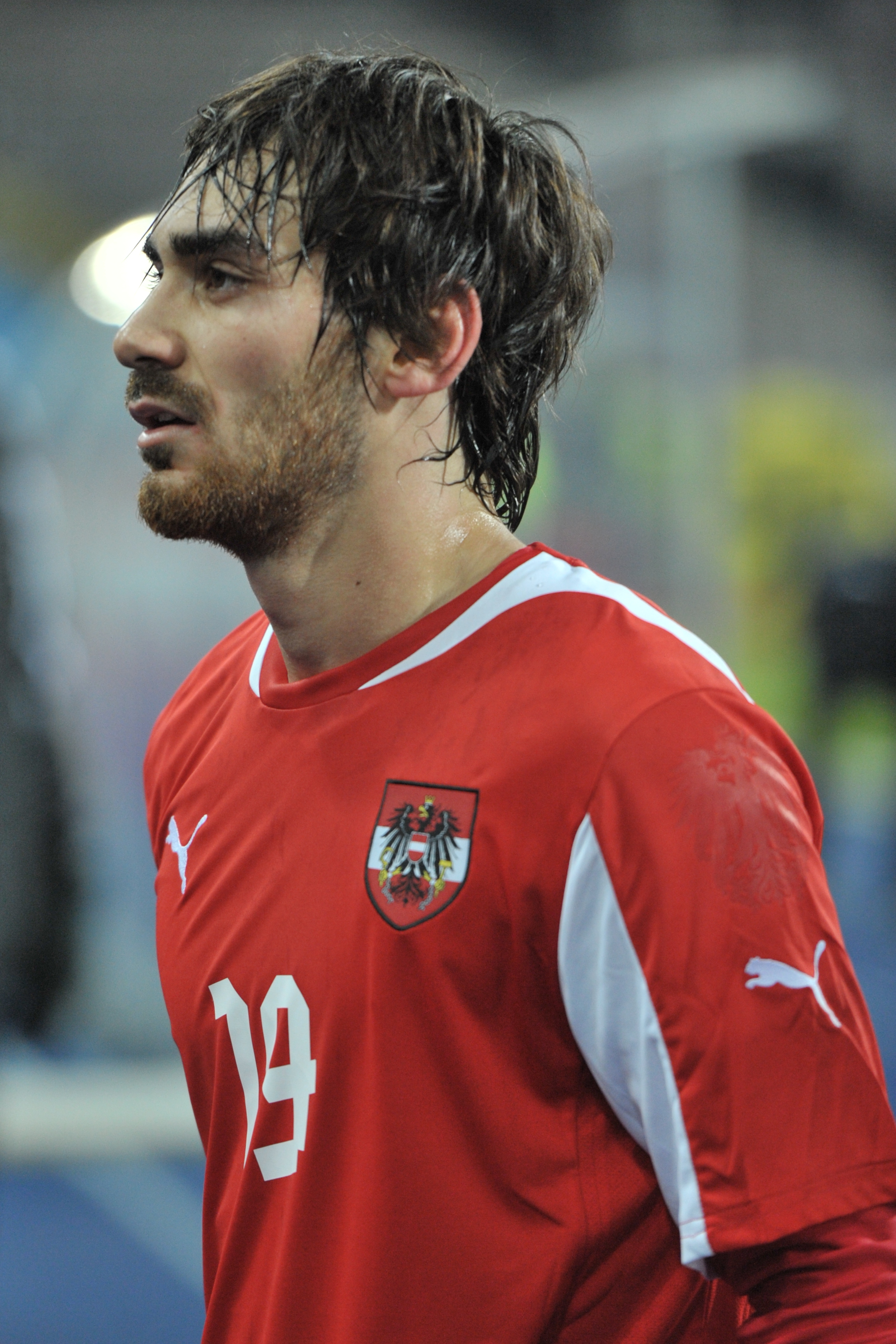
Veli Kavlak, football player

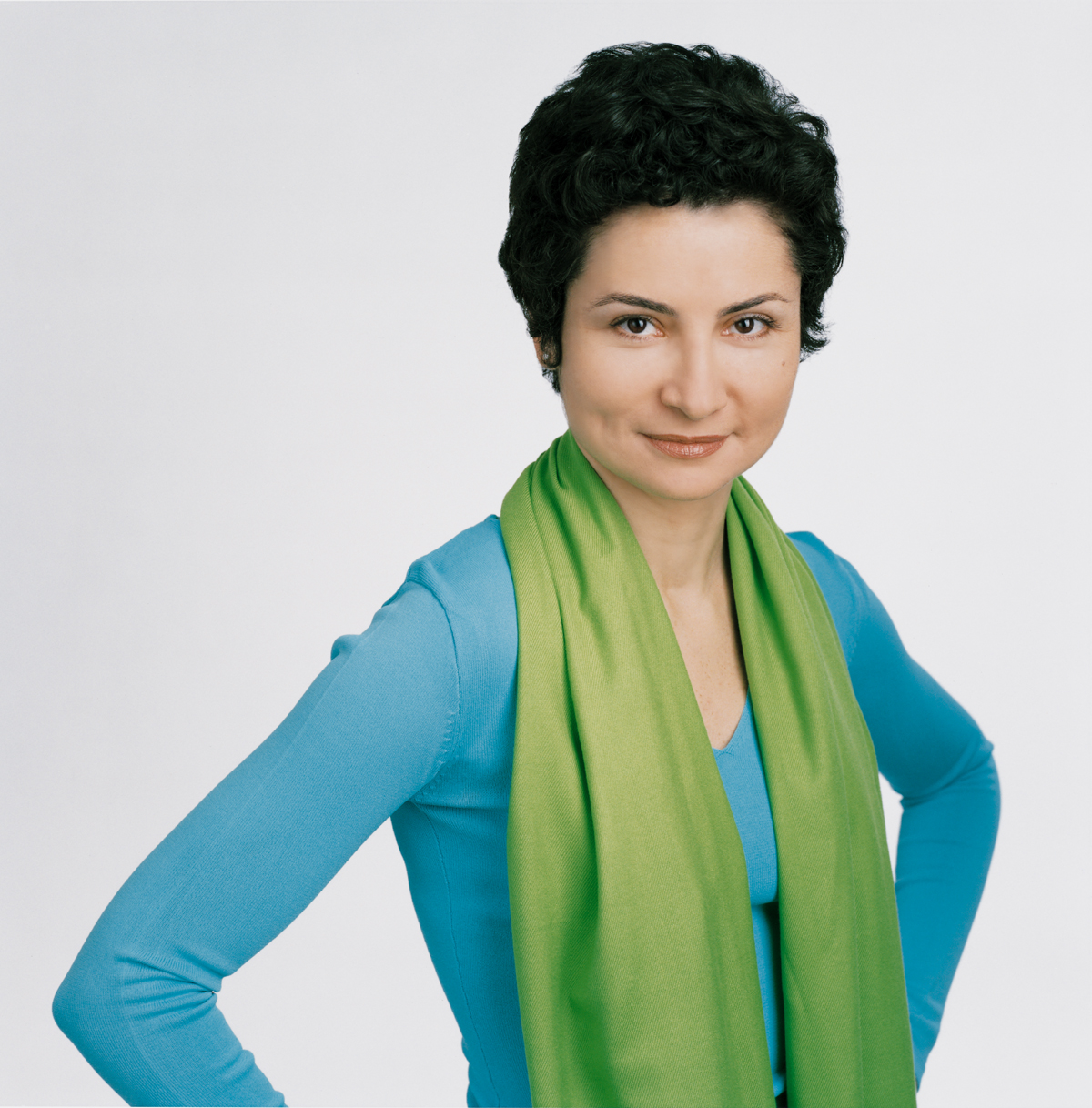
Alev Korun, politician

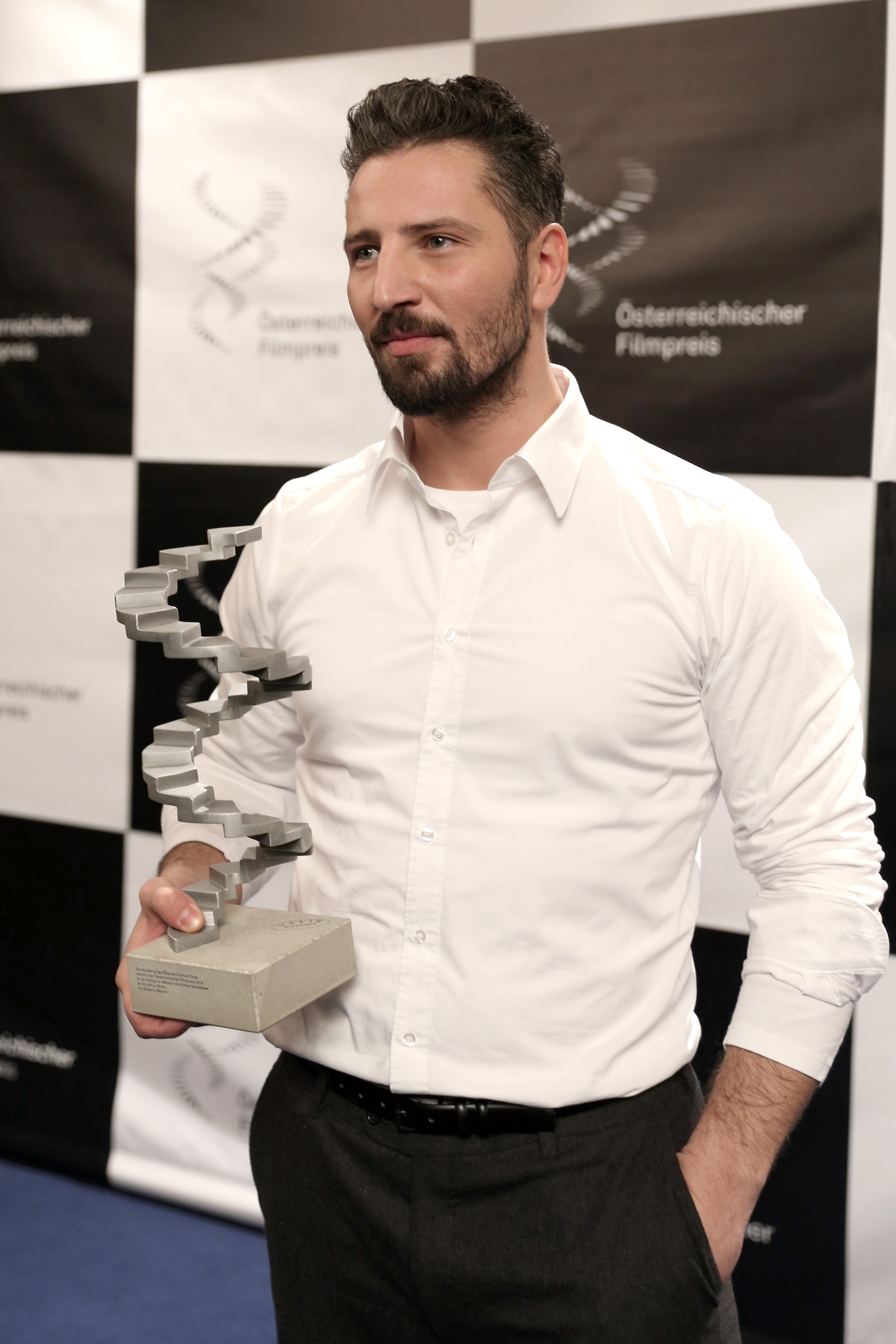
Murathan Muslu, actor

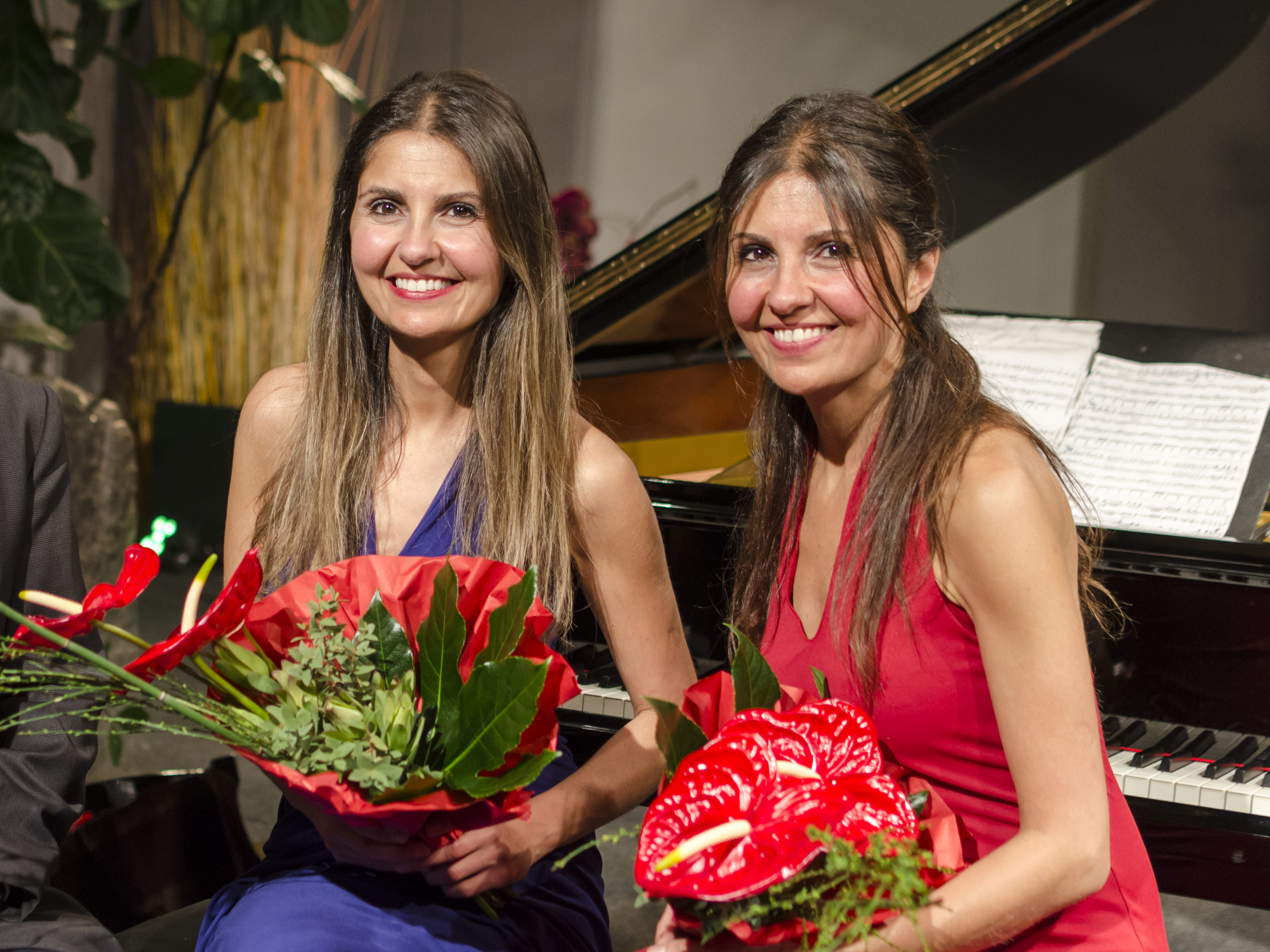
Ferhan & Ferzan Önder, pianists

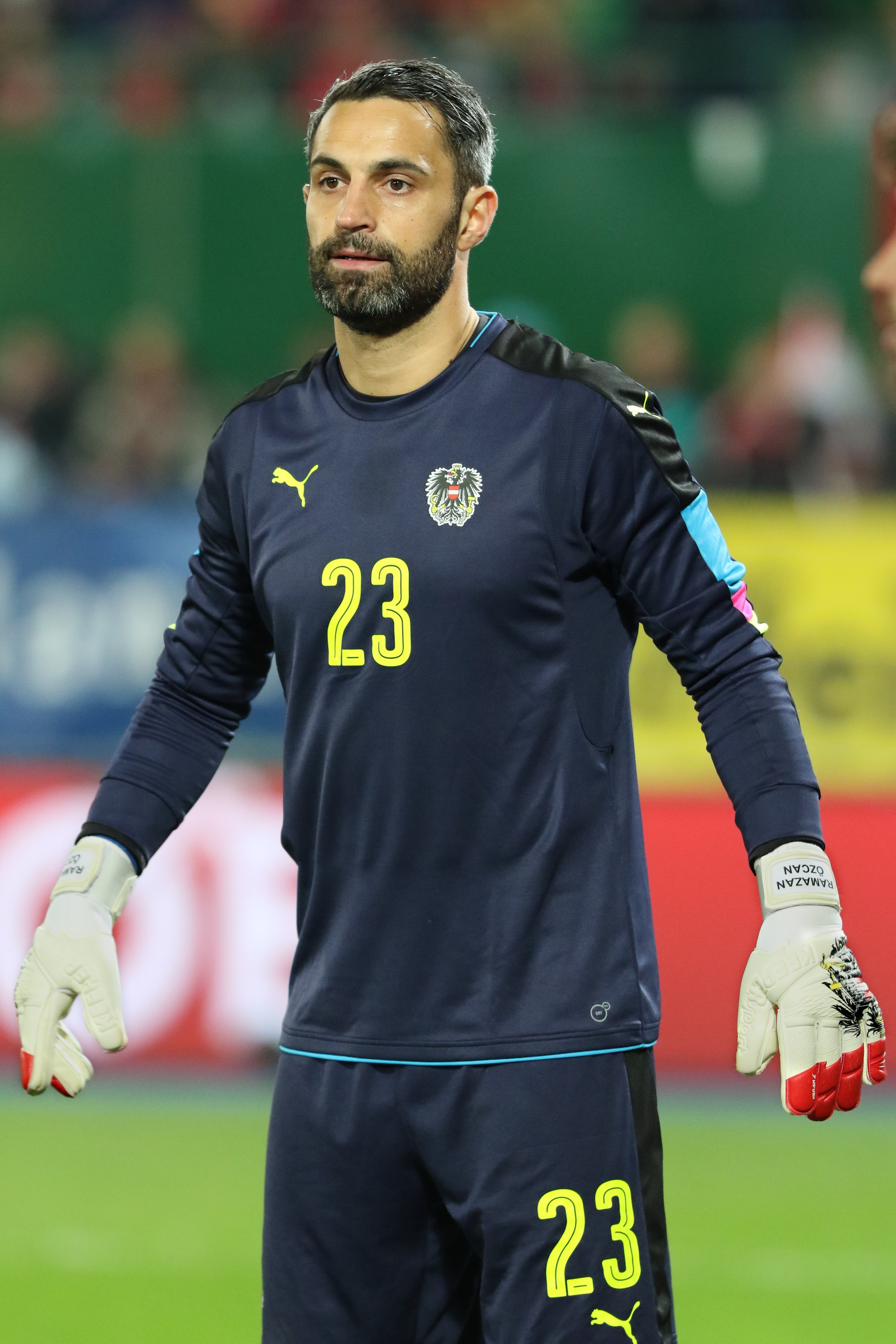
Ramazan Özcan, football player

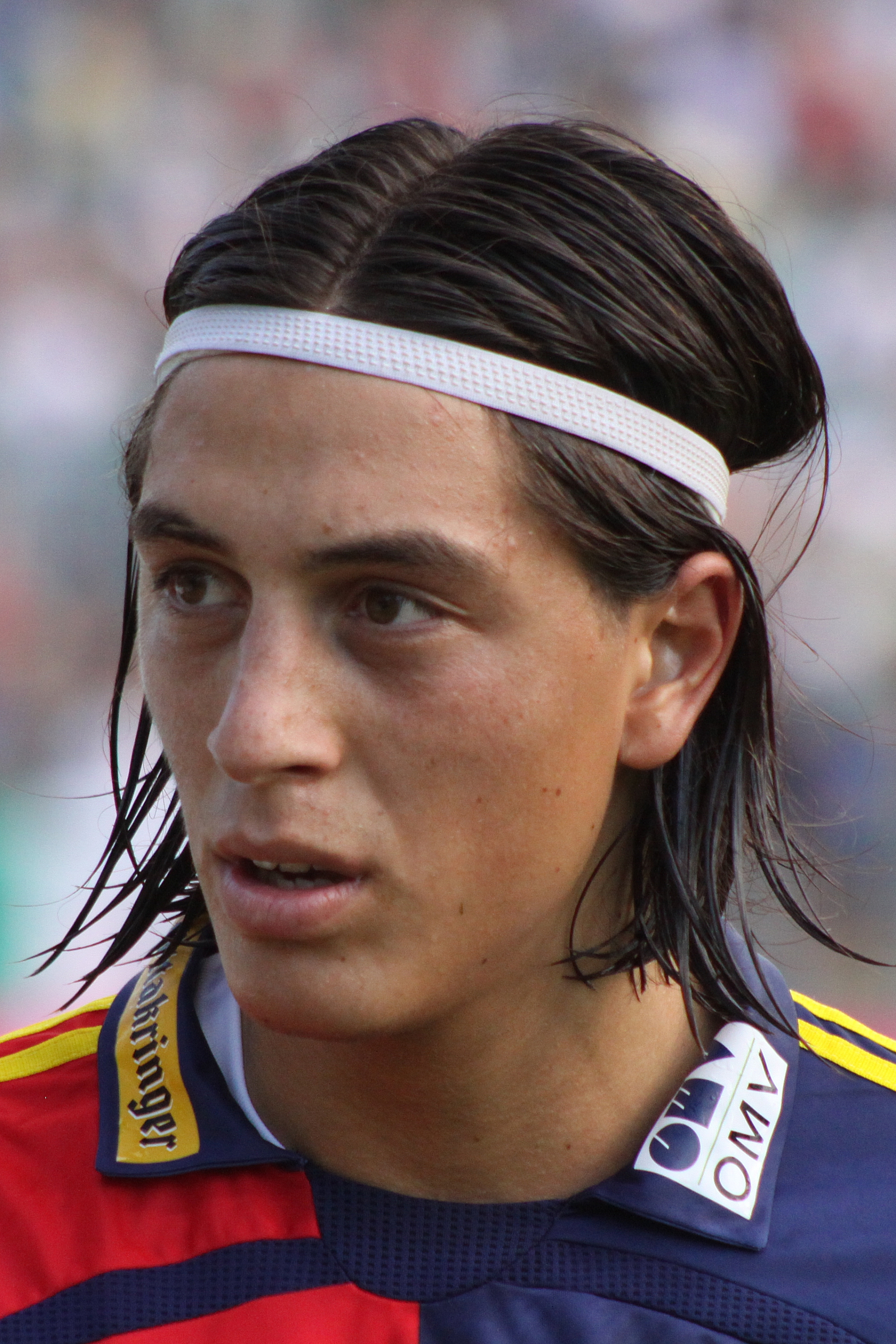
Yasin Pehlivan, football player

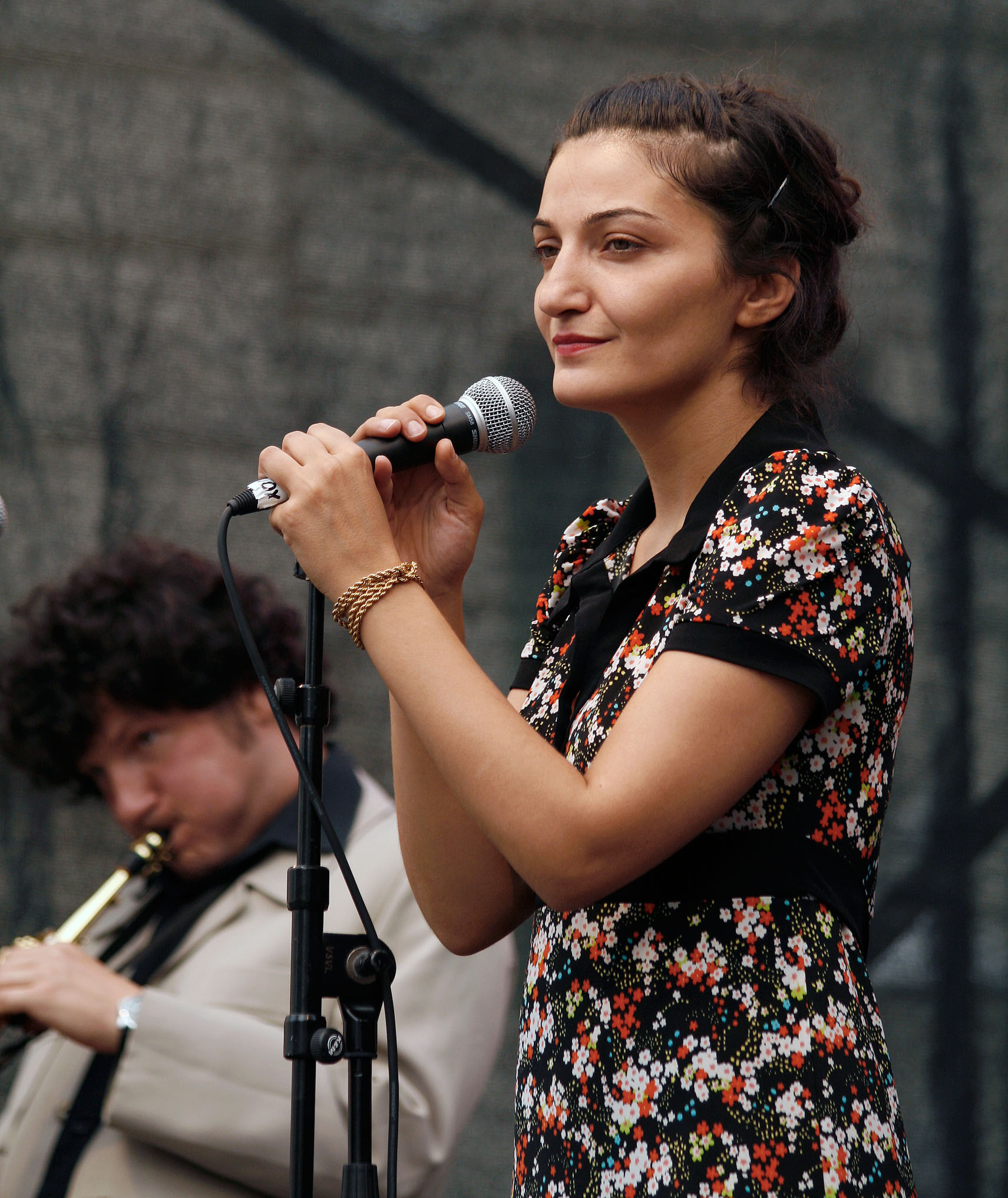
Fatima Spar, jazz musician

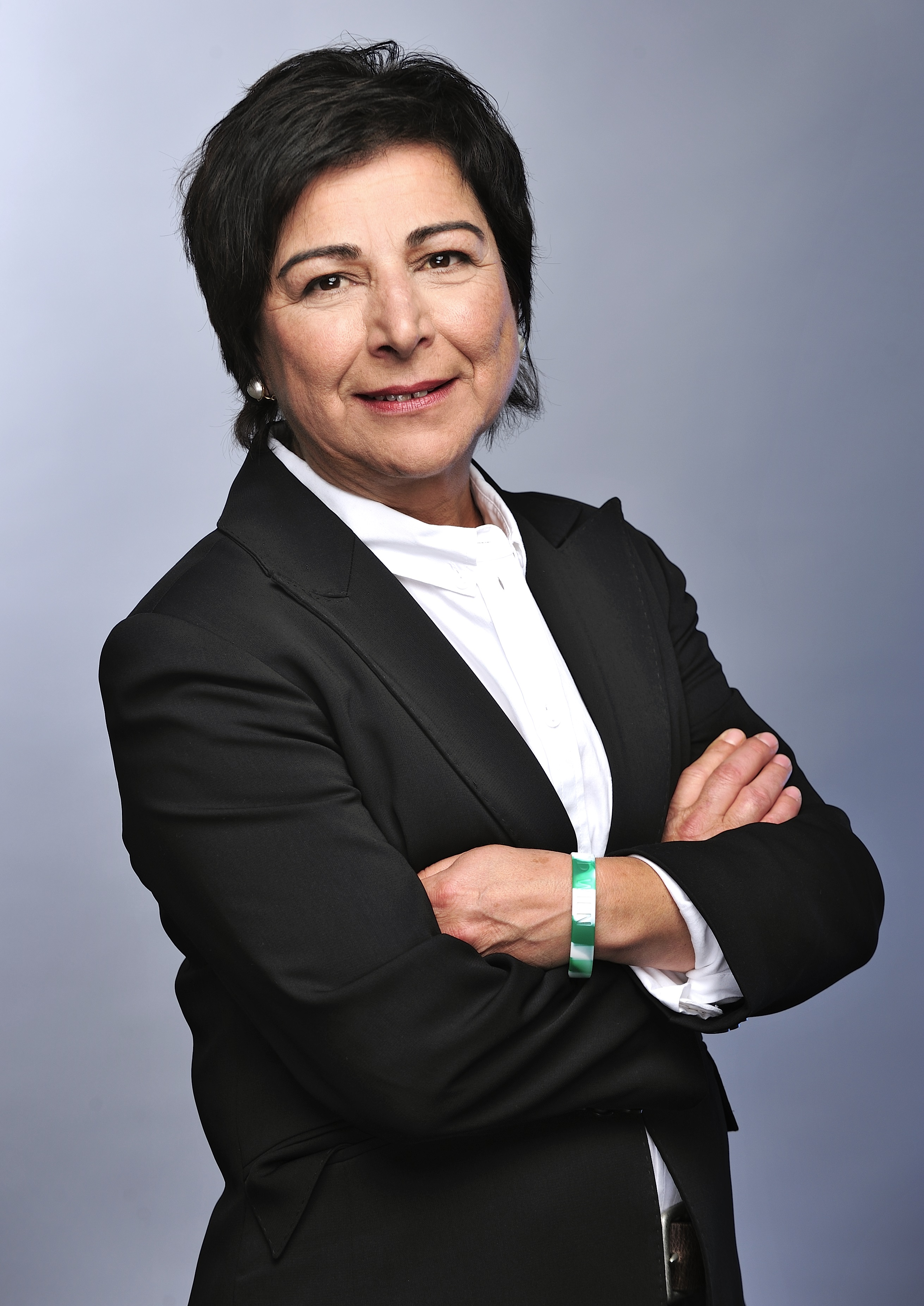
Nurten Yılmaz, politician

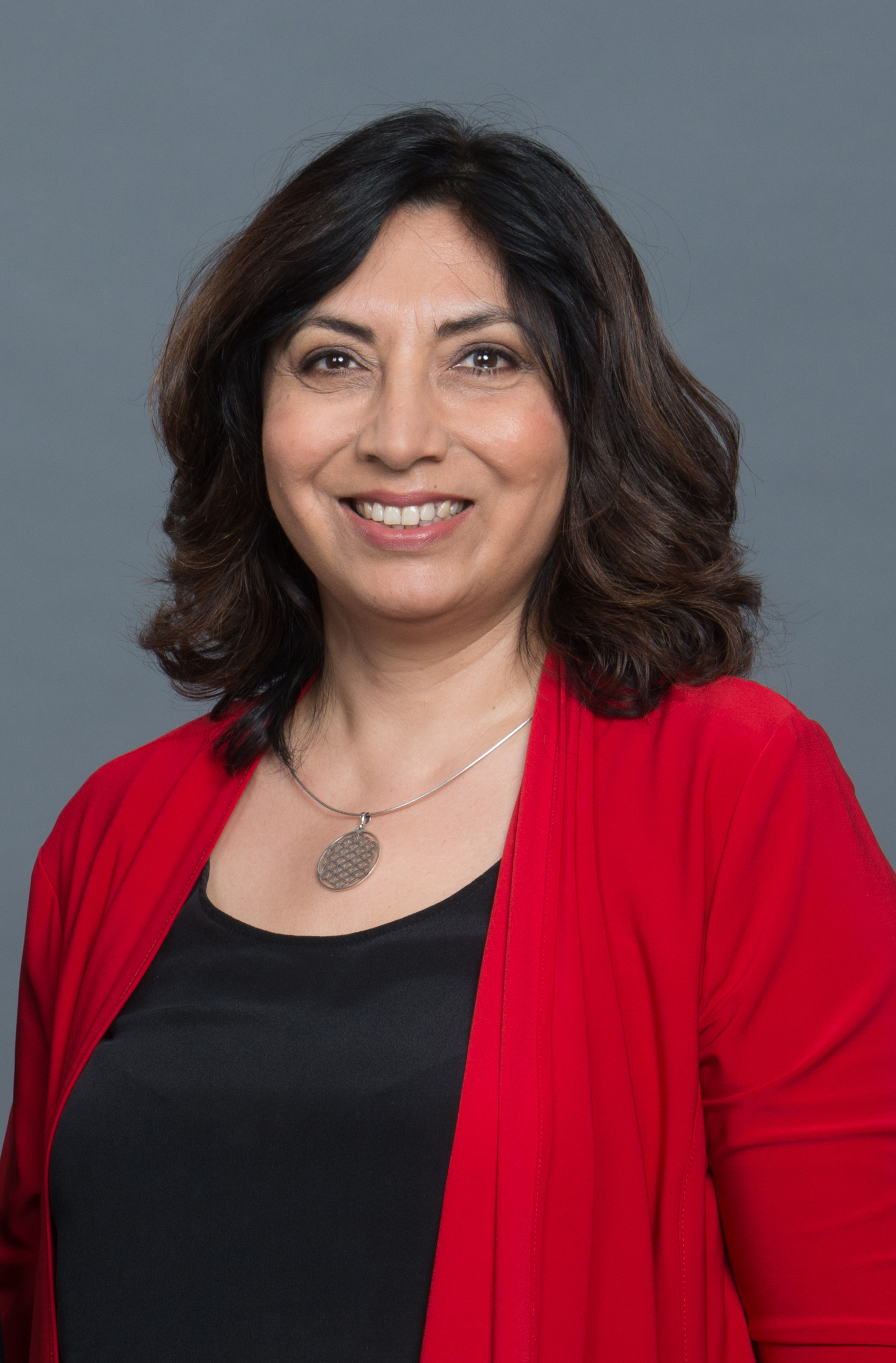
Selma Yildirim, politician

== See also ==
- List of Turkish Austrians
- Austria–Turkey relations
- Turks in Europe
  - Turks in Germany
  - Turks in Hungary
  - Turks in Italy
  - Turks in Liechtenstein
  - Turks in Switzerland

== Bibliography ==
- Abadan-Unat, Nermin (1976), Turkish Workers in Europe 1960-1975: A Socio-economic Reappraisal, BRILL, ISBN 90-04-04478-7.
- Abbott, John S. C. (2007), The Empire of Austria: Its Rise and Present Power, BiblioBazaar, ISBN 978-1-4264-9252-5.
- Ache, Peter (2008), Cities Between Competitiveness and Cohesion: Discourses, Realities and Implementation, Springer, ISBN 978-1-4020-8240-5.
- Akgündüz, Ahmet (2008), Labour Migration from Turkey to Western Europe, 1960-1974: A Multidisciplinary Analysis, Ashgate Publishing, ISBN 978-0-7546-7390-3.
- Bauböck, Rainer (2006), Migration and Citizenship: Legal Status, Rights and Political Participation, Amsterdam University Press, ISBN 90-5356-888-3.
- Bhatia, Tej K.; Ritchie, William C. (2006), The Handbook of Bilingualism, Wiley-Blackwell, ISBN 0-631-22735-0.
- Boswell, Christina; Royal Institute of International Affairs (2003), European Migration Policies in Flux: Changing Patterns of Inclusion and Exclusion, Wiley-Blackwell, ISBN 1-4051-0296-9.
- Dana, Leo Paul (2008), Handbook of Research on Ethnic Minority Entrepreneurship: A Co-evolutionary View on Resource Management, Edward Elgar Publishing, ISBN 978-1-84542-733-7.
- Frejka, Tomaš; Hoem, Jan Michael; Toulemon, Laurent; Sobotka, Tomáš (2008), Childbearing Trends and Policies in Europe, Books on Demand, ISBN 978-3-8370-6187-1.
- Hunter, Shireen (2002), Islam, Europe's Second Religion: The New Social, Cultural, and Political Landscape, Greenwood Publishing Group, ISBN 0-275-97609-2.
- Kasaba, Reşat (2008), The Cambridge History of Turkey: Volume 4, Turkey in the Modern World, Cambridge University Press, ISBN 978-0-521-62096-3.
- Kohl, Katrin Maria; Robertson, Ritchie (2006), A History of Austrian Literature 1918-2000, Boydell & Brewer, ISBN 1-57113-276-7.
- Martin, Philip L.; Weil, Patrick (2006), Managing Migration: The Promise of Cooperation, Lexington Books, ISBN 0-7391-1341-0.
- Matzka, Christian (2009), Austria and Turkey: their burden of histories (PDF), University of Vienna
- Nielsen, Jørgen S. (2004), Muslims in Western Europe, Edinburgh University Press, ISBN 0-7486-1844-9.
- Nikolov, Marianne; Curtain, Helena (2000), An Early Start: Young Learners and Modern Languages in Europe and Beyond, Council of Europe, ISBN 92-871-4411-7.
- Organisation for Economic Co-operation and Development (2008), International Migration Outlook: SOPEMI 2008, OECD Publishing, ISBN 978-92-64-04565-1.
- Panayi, Panikos (1999), Outsiders: A History of European Minorities, Continuum International Publishing Group, ISBN 1-85285-179-1.
- Plender, Richard (1988), International Migration Law, Martinus Nijhoff Publishers, ISBN 90-247-3604-8.
- Potz, Richard; Wieshaider, Wolfgang (2004), Islam and the European Union, Peeters Publishers, ISBN 90-429-1445-9.
- Statistik Austria (2017), Bevölkerung zu Jahresbeginn seit 2002, Statistik Austria
- Waardenburg, Jacques (2003), Muslims and Others: Relations in Context, Walter de Gruyter, ISBN 3-11-017627-0.
