= Alev Korun =

Turkish-Austrian politician

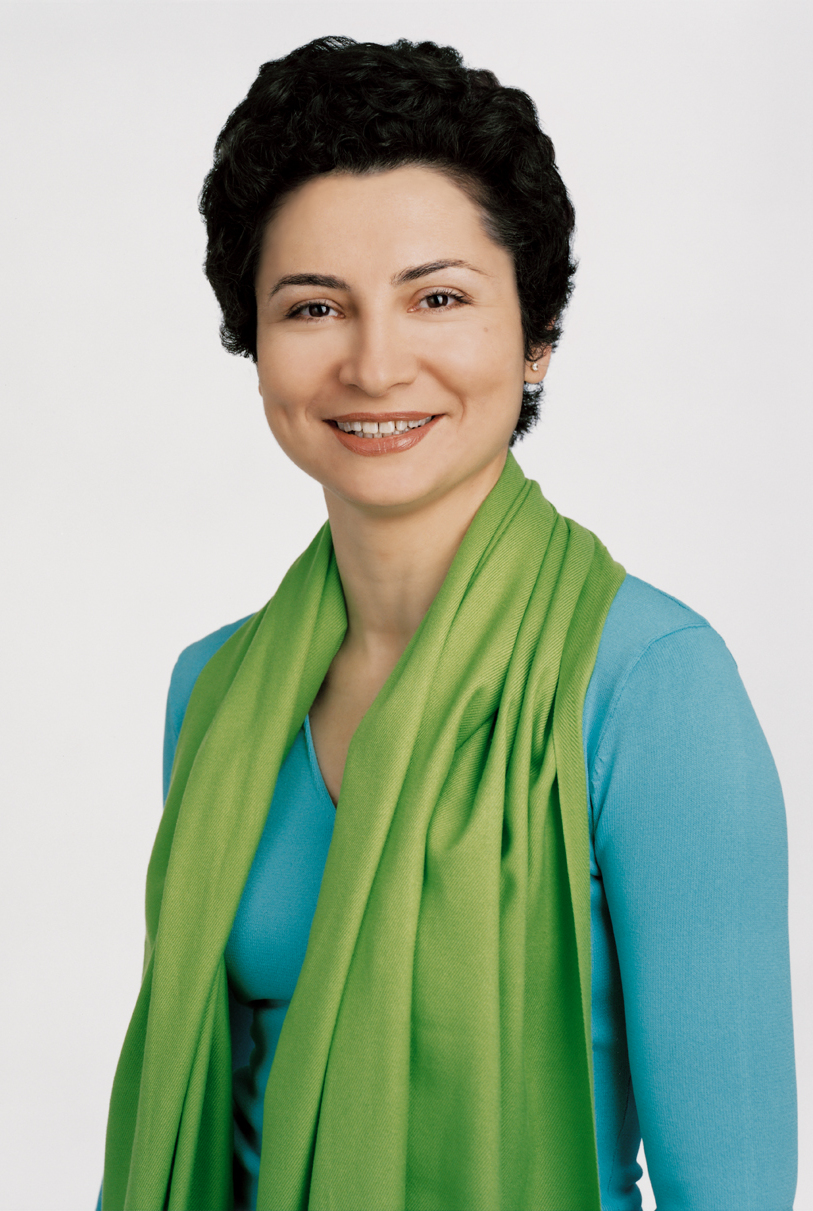
Alev Korun

Alev Korun is a Turkish-Austrian politician. Korun was the first Turkish congresswoman in the Austrian Parliament (Greens).

In parliament, Korun has been serving as a member of the Committee on Human Rights and on the Committee on Internal Affairs since 2008. In 2013, she also joined the Committee on Foreign Affairs. She was a member of parliament till fall 2017, when the Greens lost all of their seats in the National Council.

In addition to her role in parliament, Korun has been serving as a member of the Austrian delegation to the Parliamentary Assembly of the Council of Europe since 2012. As a member of the Green Party, she is part of the Socialist Group. She currently serves on the Committee on Culture, Science, Education, and Media and on the Sub-Committee on Refugee and Migrant Children and Young People. In 2017, she was part of the mission of observers from the 47-member Council of Europe to monitor the constitutional referendum that handed new powers to Turkish President Recep Tayyip Erdoğan.
