= Ogulcan Bekar =

Austrian footballer

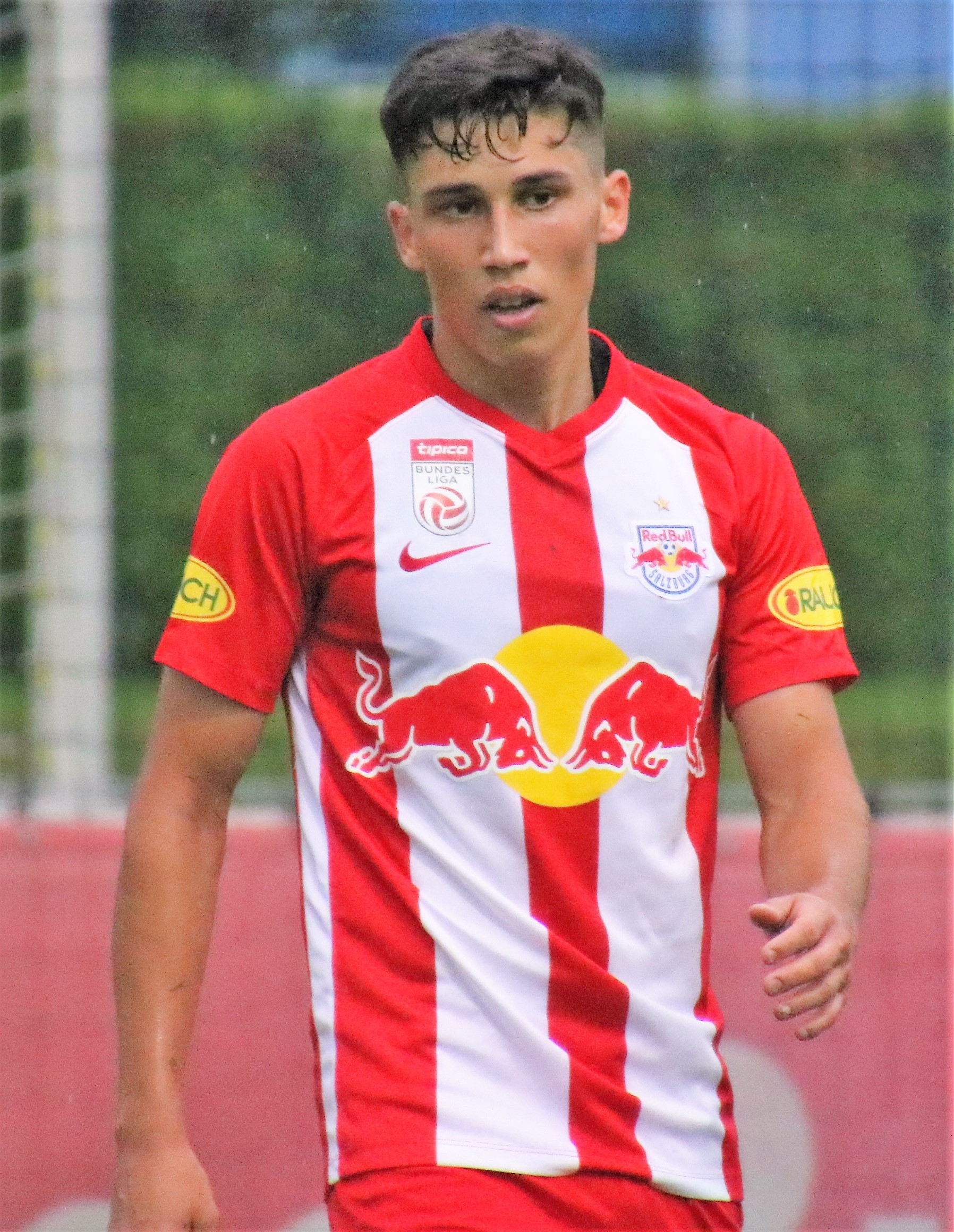
- Bekar in 2019

Personal information
- Date of birth: 1 September 2000 (age 26)
- Place of birth: Austria
- Position: Forward

Team information
- Current team: SCR Altach

Youth career
- 2007–2014: FC Mellau
- 2014–2017: AKA Vorarlberg
- 2017–2019: FC Red Bull Salzburg

Senior career*
Years	Team	Apps	(Gls)
2018–2019	Liefering	9	(0)
2020–2021	SCR Altach	0	(0)

International career
2015	Austria U15	2	(0)
2015–2016	Austria U16	5	(1)
2017	Austria U17	6	(1)
2017	Austria U18	2	(0)
- * Club domestic league appearances and goals as of 16:09, 27 July 2020 (UTC)

Ogulcan Bekar (born 1 September 2000) is an Austrian former professional footballer who last played as a forward for Austrian Bundesliga club SC Rheindorf Altach and the Austria U18 national team.

== Career ==
=== Club career ===
On 7 January 2020 SC Rheindorf Altach confirmed the signing of Bekar. Since 2019, Bekar have had a heart failure, which continued to bother him after his arrival at Altach. For that reason, he was out for the first six-month since his transfer and later confirmed his retirement.

== Personal life ==
Born in Austria, Bekar is of Turkish descent.
