= Kenan Kirim =

Austrian footballer

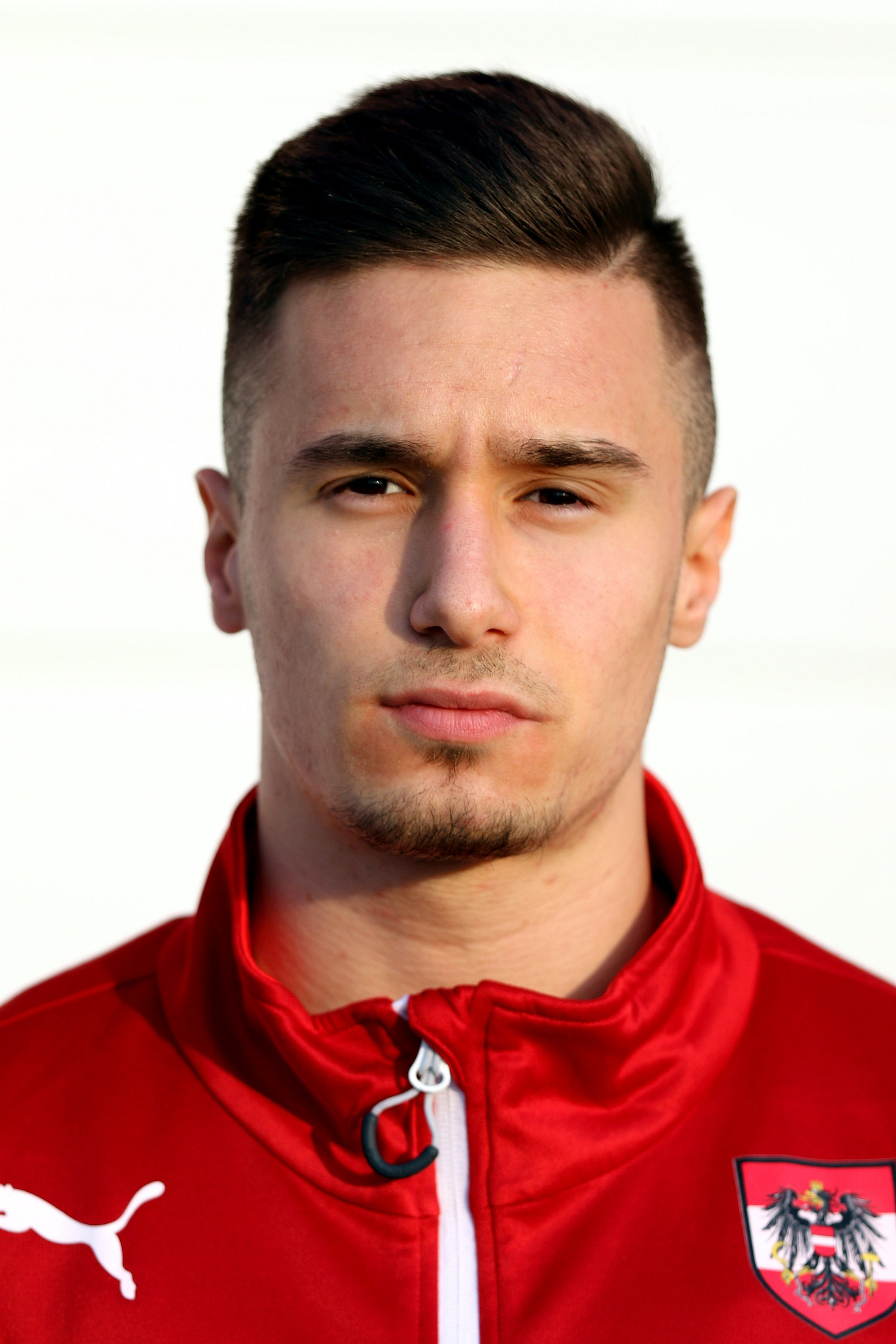

Personal information
- Full name: Kenan Kirim
- Date of birth: 24 January 1999 (age 27)
- Place of birth: St. Johann in Tirol, Austria
- Height: 1.75 m (5 ft 9 in)
- Position: Midfielder

Team information
- Current team: UFC Eben
- Number: 99

Youth career
- Red Bull Salzburg

Senior career*
| Years | Team | Apps | (Gls) |
| 2017–2018 | FC Liefering | 8 | (0) |
| 2018–2020 | Rapid Wien II | 25 | (6) |
| 2019–2020 | → SKU Amstetten (loan) | 7 | (0) |
| 2021–2022 | TSV St. Johann | 9 | (0) |
| 2023– | UFC Eben | 0 | (0) |

International career^{‡}
| 2015 | Austria U16 | 5 | (0) |
| 2015–2016 | Austria U17 | 8 | (0) |
| 2017 | Austria U18 | 2 | (0) |
- * Club domestic league appearances and goals as of 1 November 2019 ‡ National team caps and goals as of 17 April 2017

Kenan Kirim (born 24 January 1999) is an Austrian footballer who plays as a midfielder for SKU Amstetten on loan from SK Rapid Wien.

== Personal life ==
Born in Austria, Kirim is of Turkish descent.
