= Hikmet Ersek =

Turkish businessman (born 1961)

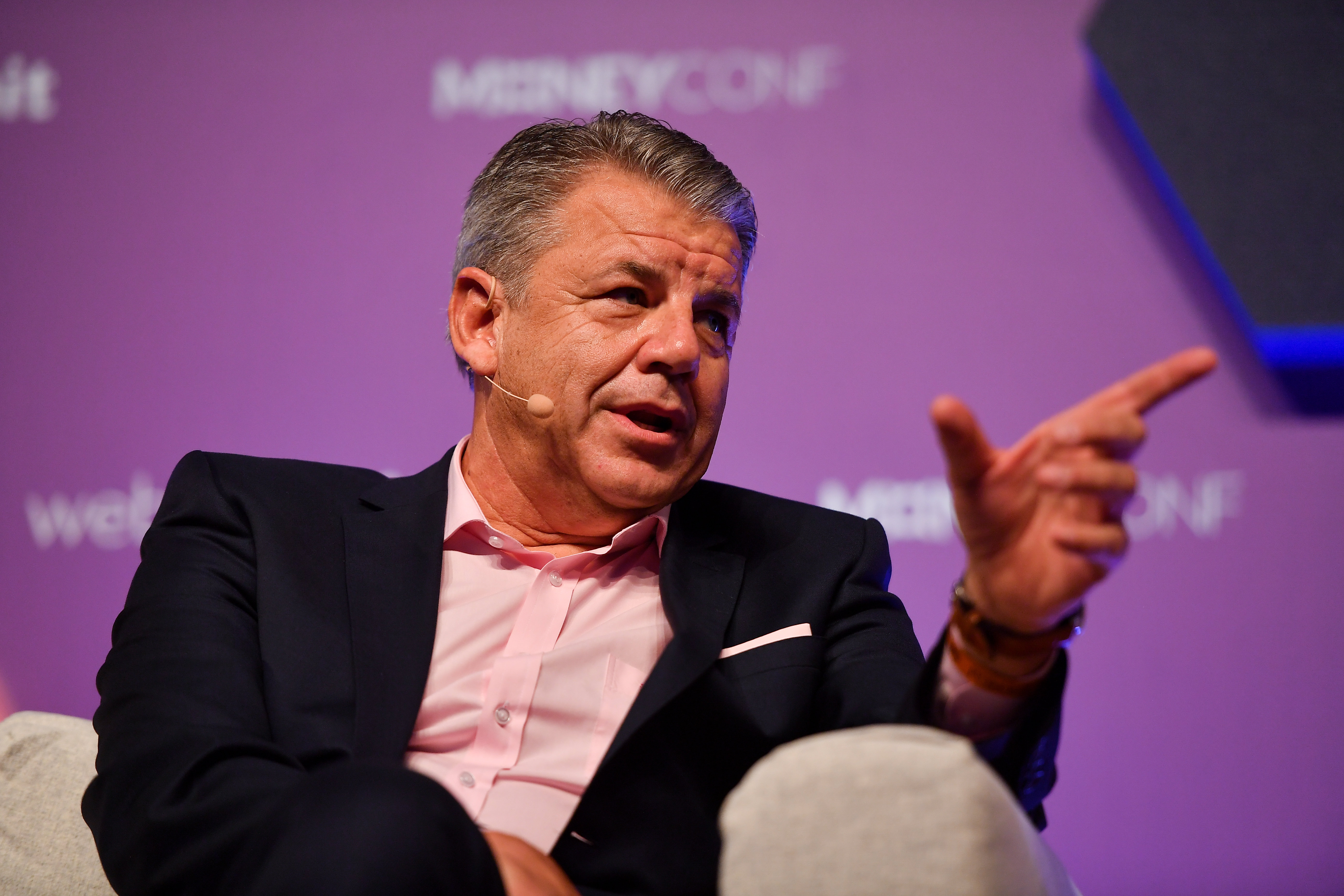
- Born: Istanbul, Turkey
- Education: Vienna University of Economics and Business

Hikmet Ersek (born 1961) is a Turkish businessman who is the former CEO of Western Union. He is also the Honorary Consul of the Republic of Austria in Denver for Colorado, New Mexico and Wyoming, in the United States.

== Early life ==
Ersek was born in Istanbul, Turkey, to a Turkish father and an Austrian mother. His parents met in Paris and then settled in Istanbul. He studied at the St. George's Austrian High School in Istanbul. Ersek later moved to Austria at the age of 19 and studied at the University of Economics in Vienna, where he graduated with a Master's (Magister) degree in Economics and Business Administration.

Ersek began his career in financial services in 1986 at Europay / MasterCard in Austria. In 1996, he joined GE Capital, and also represented the GE Corporation as a National Executive in Austria and Slovenia before he joined The Western Union Company.

== Career ==
Hikmet Ersek is the former Chief Executive Officer and Director of The Western Union Company (NYSE: WU) [2010-2021], announcing his retirement in December 2021. He was replaced by Devin McGranahan former Group President of Fiserv (NYSE: FISV).

During Ersek's tenure as CEO, which began in 2010, Western Union has diversified its business model into a digital global payments company, growing its retail money-transfer business to more than 550,000 worldwide locations, over 100,000 ATMs and kiosks, and connecting billions of bank accounts and mobile wallets worldwide.

As of Dec 31, 2020, the company's share price performance during Ersek's mandate has increased by 61% (underperforming the S&P500 that rose by 232% over the same timeframe)

Ersek has maintained a base salary of $1 million for the last three years ending 2017.

In 2018, Ersek experienced a 6% decrease in full pay to $9,175,300.

== Awards ==
- 2015: Ersek was appointed as honorary consul for Austria at the country’s consulate in Denver.
- 2019: Decoration of Honour in Silver for Services to the Republic of Austria (Silbernes Ehrenzeichen)

== Personal life ==
He speaks English, German and Turkish fluently. He also had a short career as a professional basketball player. Ersek currently lives in the Denver Metro Area, where Western Union is based.

He is married to Dr. Nayantara Ghosh Ersek, a management consultant and trainer. He has one son, Benan Ersek, who is a current basketball player for the University of Colorado Boulder.
