= List of things named after Adam Mickiewicz =

There are a number of things named after Adam Mickiewicz, a Polish poet, dramatist, essayist, publicist, translator, professor of Slavic literature, and political activist. He is regarded as national poet in Poland, Lithuania and Belarus. A principal figure in Polish Romanticism, he is counted as one of Poland's "Three Bards" ("Trzej Wieszcze") and is widely regarded as Poland's greatest poet. He is also considered one of the greatest Slavic and European poets and has been dubbed a "Slavic bard". A leading Romantic dramatist, he has been compared in Poland and Europe to Byron and Goethe.

== Institutions ==
- Adam Mickiewicz High School in Poznań
- Adam Mickiewicz Institute, Warsaw
- Adam Mickiewicz Library and Dramatic Circle, Buffalo, New York
- Adam Mickiewicz Museum:
  - Adam Mickiewicz Museum, Istanbul
  - Adam Mickiewicz Museum, Paris
  - Adam Mickiewicz Museum of Literature, Warsaw
- Adam Mickiewicz Theatre, Cieszyn
- Adam Mickiewicz University in Poznań
  - Adam Mickiewicz University Polar Station

== Places ==
- Asteroid 5889 Mickiewicz
- Mickiewicz (crater)
- Mickiewicz Square, Lviv, Ukraine
- Adam Mickiewicz Alley, Bydgoszcz
- Osiedle Mickiewicza, Białystok
- Wzgórze Mickiewicza, a district of Gdańsk
  - Most streets in the district are named after the characters of Mickiewicz's book Pan Tadeusz (e.g. Ulica Jacka Soplicy, Ulica Telimeny). Some of them bear the names of the characters of other works (e.g. Ulica Świtezianki, Ulica Rusałki) by Mickiewicz or of people connected with the poets life (e.g. Ulica Maryli, Ulica Filaretów).
- Mickiewicz Falls, Tatra Mountains
- Adam Mickiewicz Monument
- Adam Mickiewicz Monument, Gorzów Wielkopolski
- Adam Mickiewicz Monument, Kraków
- Adam Mickiewicz Monument, Lviv, Ukraine
- Adam Mickiewicz Monument, Paris, France
- Adam Mickiewicz Monument, Poznań
- Adam Mickiewicz Monument, Vilnius
- Adam Mickiewicz Monument, Warsaw
- Mickiewiczova ulica, Bratislava Slovakia

== Other ==
- Mickiewicz Battalion, Spanish Civil War
- Mickiewicz Legion, 1848, Rome
- 10 złotych coin commemorating Adam Mickiewicz (pl:10 złotych wzór 1975 Adam Mickiewicz)
- Portrait of Adam Mickiewicz on the Ayu-Dag Cliff, National Museum, Warsaw
