= Mickiewicz (surname) =

Mickiewicz is a Polish form of the Belarusian surname Mickievič. It corresponds to Lithuanianized: Mickevičius, and Belarusian, Russian: Mitskevich. Notable people with this surname include:

- Adam Mickiewicz (1798–1855), Polish poet, dramatist, essayist, publicist, translator, professor of Slavic literature, and political activist, regarded as national poet in Poland, Lithuania and Belarus
- Denis Mickiewicz (born 1929), professor emeritus of Russian Literature at Duke University and the founding conductor of the Yale Russian Chorus
- Jacek Mickiewicz (born 1970), Polish road racing cyclist
- Maria Mickiewicz (born 1984), Polish chess master
- Matt Mickiewicz (born 1983), internet entrepreneur
- Mieczysław Mickiewicz (1879–1939), Ukrainian politician and lawyer of Polish descent, statesman of the Second Polish Republic

== See also ==
- Mickiewicz (crater), on Mercury
- 5889 Mickiewicz, a minor planet
- List of things named after Adam Mickiewicz
