= Baranavichy district =

District of Brest region, Belarus

Baranavichy district Баранавіцкі раён (Belarusian) Барановичский район (Russian)
- District
- Flag Coat of arms

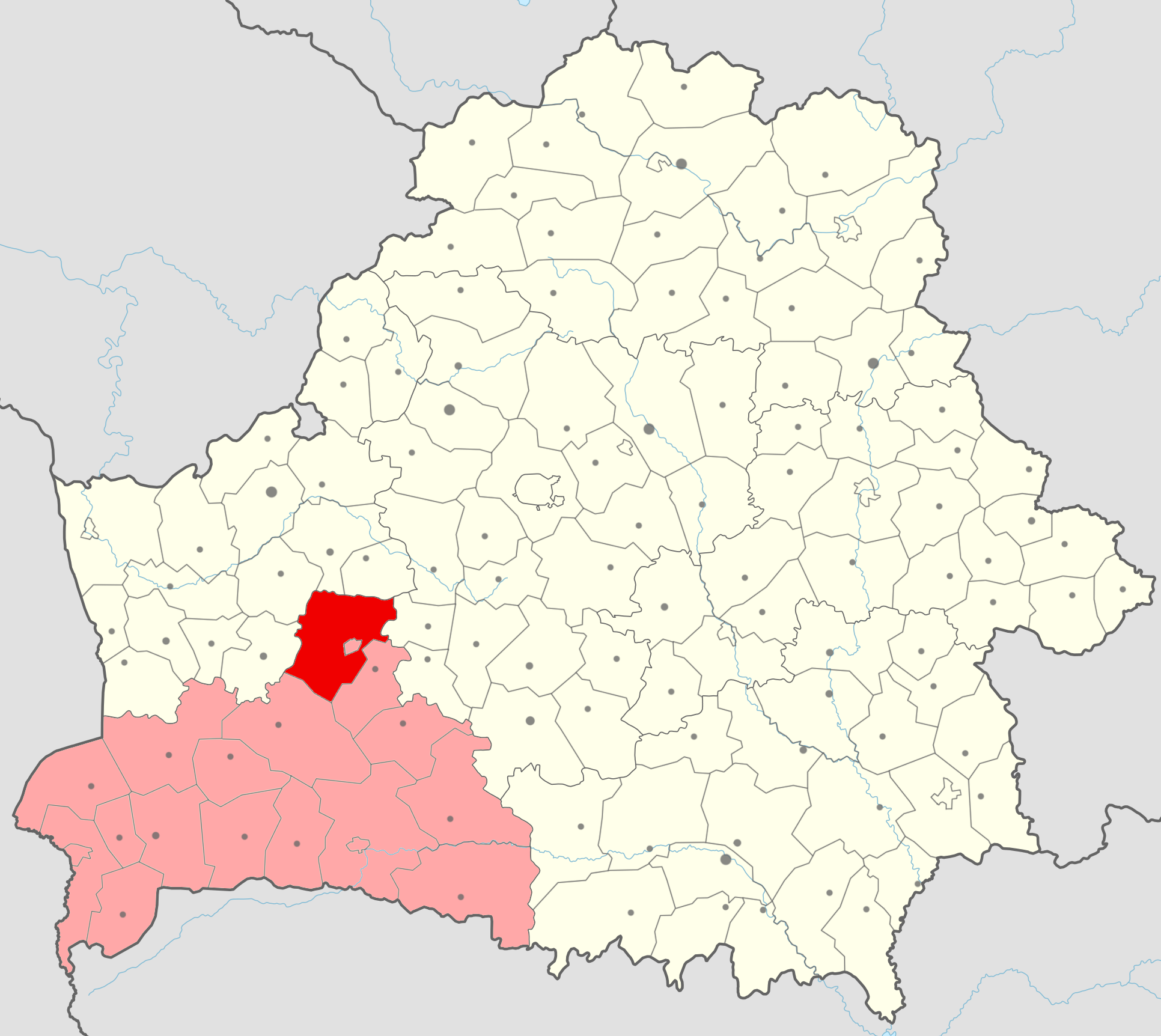
- Coordinates: 53°07′40″N 25°58′43″E
- Country: Belarus
- Region: Brest Region
- Administrative center: Baranavichy

Area
  - District: 2,170.25 km^{2} (837.94 sq mi)

Population (2024)
  - District: 27,287
  - Density: 12.573/km^{2} (32.564/sq mi)
  - Urban: 1,705
  - Rural: 25,582
- Time zone: UTC+3 (MSK)
- Website: baranovichi.brest-region.gov.by

Baranavichy district or Baranavičy district (Belarusian: Баранавіцкі раён; Russian: Барановичский район) is a district (raion) of Brest region in Belarus. Its administrative center is Baranavichy, which is administratively separated from the district. As of 2024, it has a population of 27,287.

== Demographics ==
At the time of the 2009 Belarusian census, Baranavichy district had a population of 41,902. Of these, 86.9% were of Belarusian, 5.9% Polish, 5.2% Russian and 1.1% Ukrainian ethnicity. 81.6% spoke Belarusian and 16.6% Russian as their native language.

== Notable residents ==
- Adam Mickiewicz (1798, Zavosse village – 1855), poet, dramatist, essayist, publicist and translator
- Jan (Ivan) Sierada (1879, Zadzveja village – 1943), Belarusian statesman, writer, first president of the Belarusian Democratic Republic

== See also ==
- The Holocaust in Baranavichy district
