= Portrait of Adam Mickiewicz on the Ayu-Dag Cliff =

Painting by Walenty Wańkowicz

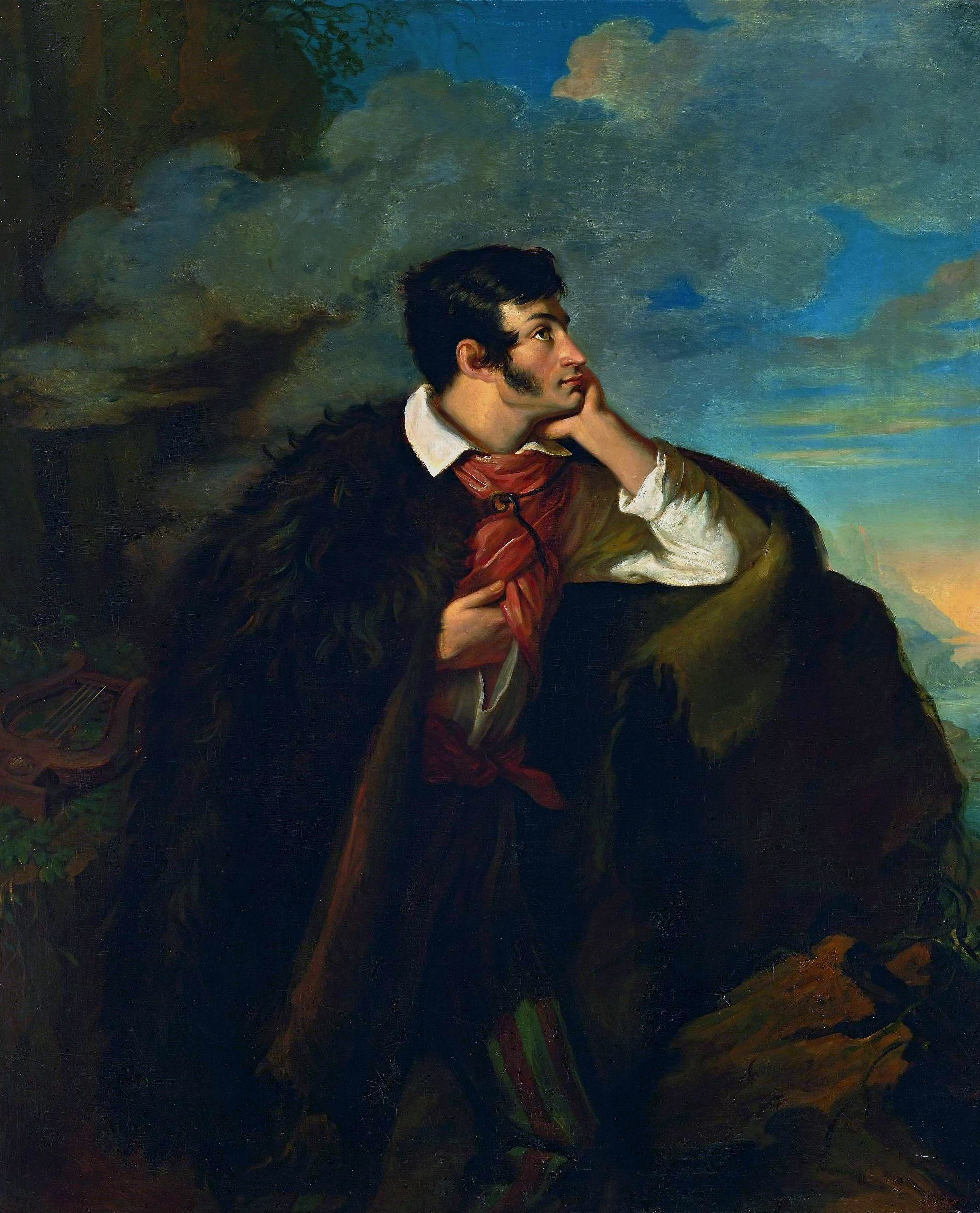
- Artist: Walenty Wańkowicz
- Year: 1827–1828
- Medium: Oil-on-canvas
- Dimensions: 148 cm × 58.2 cm (49.2 in × 22.9 in)
- Location: National Museum, Warsaw

The Portrait of Adam Mickiewicz on the Ayu-Dag Cliff (Polish: Portret Adama Mickiewicza na Judahu skale) is an oil portrait of Adam Mickiewicz by Walenty Wańkowicz created from 1827 to 1828. Since 1925 it has been in the collection of the National Museum in Warsaw.

== Description ==
Created in the Romanticism style, the portrait depicts Mickiewicz in a Byronic pose leaning on a cliff of the Ayu-Dag Mountain, Crimea overseeing the Black Sea, coated in a burka (a coat of the highlanders of Caucasus).

The theme and the title of the portrait come from the first line of the last sonnet Ajudah (translated as "On Juda's Cliff") of The Crimean Sonnets by the poet:

Lubię poglądać wsparty na Judahu skale,
Jak spienione bałwany to w czarne szeregi
Ścisnąwszy się buchają, to jak srebrne śniegi
W milijonowych tęczach kołują wspaniale.

On Juda's Cliff I love to lean and look
On waves that battling beat and break with might,
While farther seaward in a bland delight,
I see them shining where a rainbow shook.

Wańkowicz befriended Mickiewicz at Vilnius University. The portrait was created when they met again in St.Petersburg. At that time Mickiewicz introduced Wańkowicz to Alexander Pushkin, and Wańkowicz started to work on the portrait of Pushkin as a pair to that of Mickiewicz. Unfortunately only the sketch Pushkin by a Source survived.

== See also ==
- List of Polish painters
