= Ode to Youth =

1820 poem by Adam Mickiewicz

- by Adam Mickiewicz
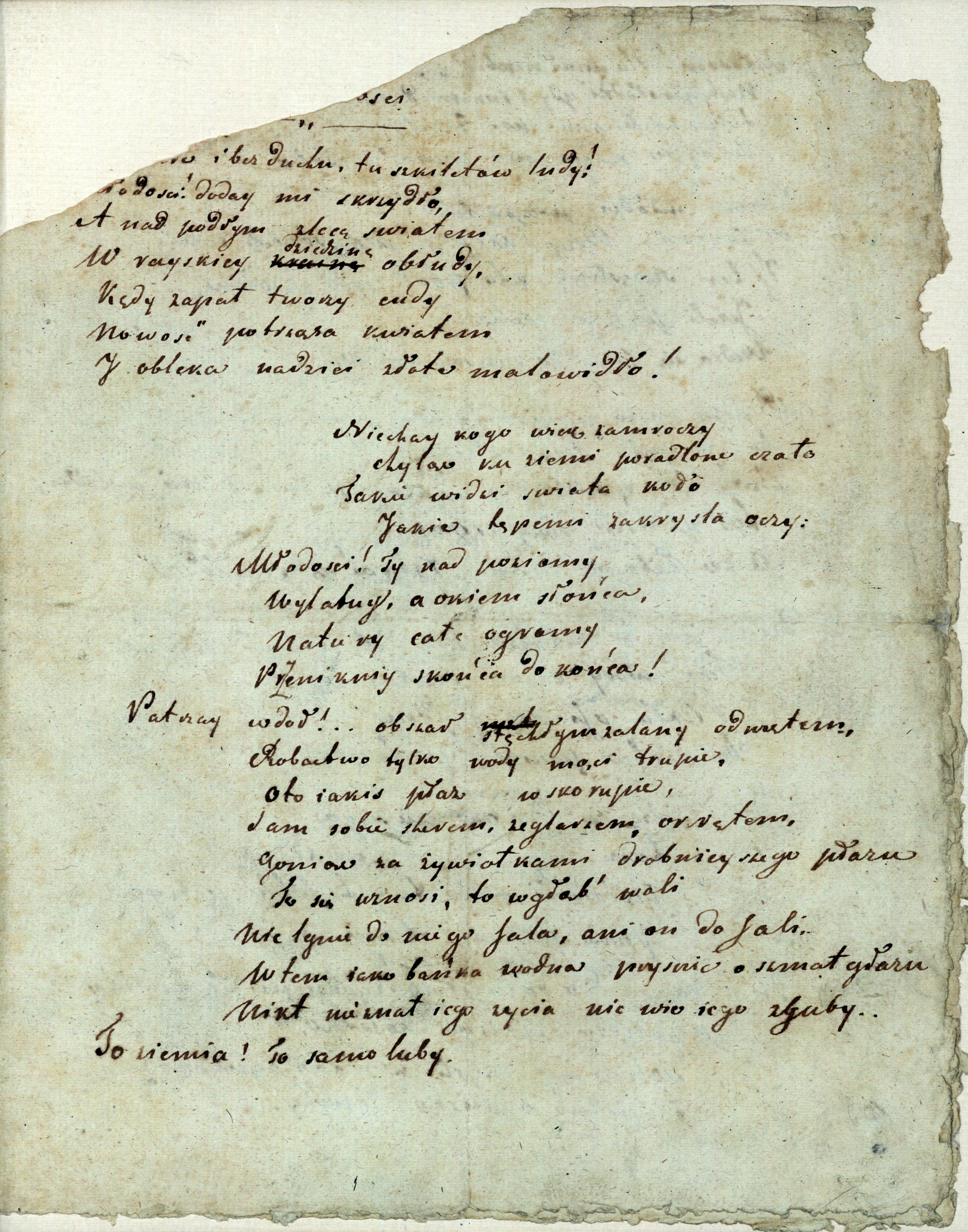
- "Ode to Youth" – 1820 manuscript
- Original title: Oda do młodości
- Written: 26 December 1820
- Language: Polish
- Form: Ode
- Publication date: 1827

"Ode to Youth" (Polish: "Oda do młodości") is an 1820 poem by Polish Romantic-era poet, dramatist and essayist Adam Mickiewicz.

== Background and critical reception ==
"Ode to Youth" was one of Mickiewicz' first poems, and one of his most popular and enduring ones, although the reception among critics has been mixed. It has been described by one literature scholar, Ignacy Chrzanowski, as "Mickiewicz's first masterpiece"; another scholar, Juliusz Kleiner, disagreed.

The theme of the poem is the duties and rights of the youth in the service of an overarching, higher ideal. The youth are said to have a moral obligation to take action. Michael Ferber describes it as "unabashedly Schillerian in inspiration", and notes that the poem "deftly exploits neo-Classicist poetics in order to subvert the discourse that engendered them." The poem has also been described as a manifesto of the secret student organization, the Philomaths, to which Mickiewicz belonged at that time.

== Publishing ==
Mickiewicz finished the poem in 1820, the year of his debut as a poet, but it was not included in his first tome of poetry, published that year. This was because the "Ode" was seen as too patriotic and revolutionary for publication in the Russian portion of partitioned Poland where Mickiewicz spent his youth, and as such rejected by the reviewing Russian censor in Vilnius. It would not appear officially for many years, but unofficial copies were made in such numbers that at the time of the November Uprising (an unsuccessful Polish insurrection against the occupying Russian forces) in 1830 the poem was already well known. Koropeckyj writes that "copied and recopied among the youths of Vilnius and soon enough beyond ... [it] became the hymn of a generation."

The work was first published, unauthorized, in Lviv (in the Austrian Partition) 1827; the first version authorized by Mickiewicz was published in Paris in 1838.

From May 2024, a manuscript of the earliest version of the poem is presented at a permanent exhibition in the Palace of the Commonwealth.

== See also ==
- Ballads and Romances
- Romanticism in Poland
- Ode to Joy
- Ode to a Nightingale
