= Wańkowicz =

Wańkowicz (Belarusian: Ваньковіч, Vankovich, Lacinka: Vańkovič) is a Polish and Belarusian surname. Notable people with the surname include:

- Melchior Wańkowicz (1892–1974), Polish writer, journalist, and publisher
- Walenty Wańkowicz (1799–1842), Polish painter
