= Mickevičius =

- Lithuanian surname
- m.: Mickevičius
- f.: (unmarried): Mickevičiūtė
- f.: (married): Mickevičienė

Mickevičius is a Lithuanian language family name derived from Mickus, a pet name of Dmitrijus. It corresponds to Polish Mickiewicz, Belarusian Mickievič and Russian Mitskevich.

Notable people with the surname include:

- Vincas Mickevičius
  - Vincas Krėvė-Mickevičius (1882–1954), writer
  - Vincas Mickevičius-Kapsukas (1880–1935), communist activist
- Konstancija Mickevičiūtė, mother of Algirdas Julien Greimas
- Adomas Mickevičius, Polish-Lithuanian poet, Adam Mickiewicz
