= Adam Mickiewicz Museum =

Adam Mickiewicz Museum may refer to:

- Adam Mickiewicz Museum, Istanbul
- Adam Mickiewicz Museum, Paris
- Adam Mickiewicz Museum of Literature, Warsaw
