= Ballads and Romances =

1822 collection of ballads by Adam Mickiewicz

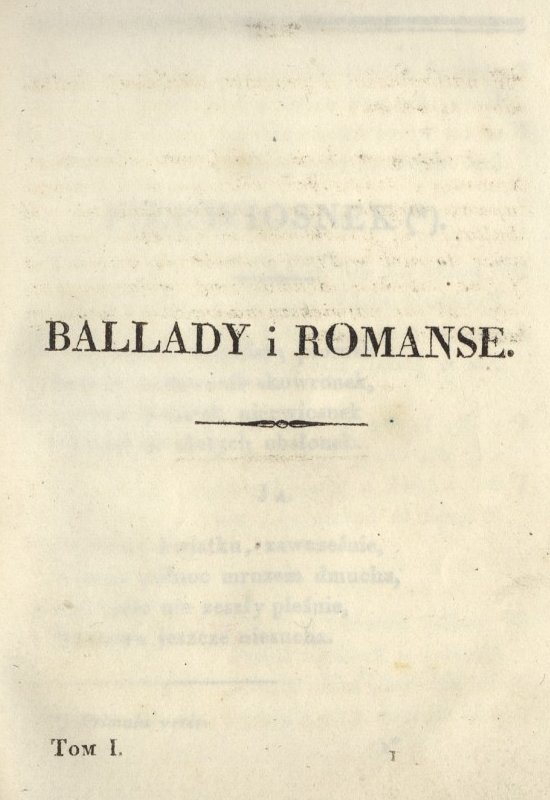
- Author: Adam Mickiewicz
- Original title: Ballady i romanse
- Language: Polish
- Genre: poetry
- Publication date: 1822
- Publication place: Russian Empire

Ballads and Romances (Polish: Ballady i romanse) is a collection of ballads written by Polish Romantic-era poet Adam Mickiewicz in 1822 and first published in Vilnius, Russian Empire, as part of the first volume of his Poezje ("Poetry"). The publication of the collection is widely seen as the main manifesto of Polish romanticism as well as the beginning of the development of the ballad genre in Polish literature. However, Ballads and Romances preserve some of the traditions of earlier literary genres popular in Poland such as duma, dumka and idyll.

== Analysis ==
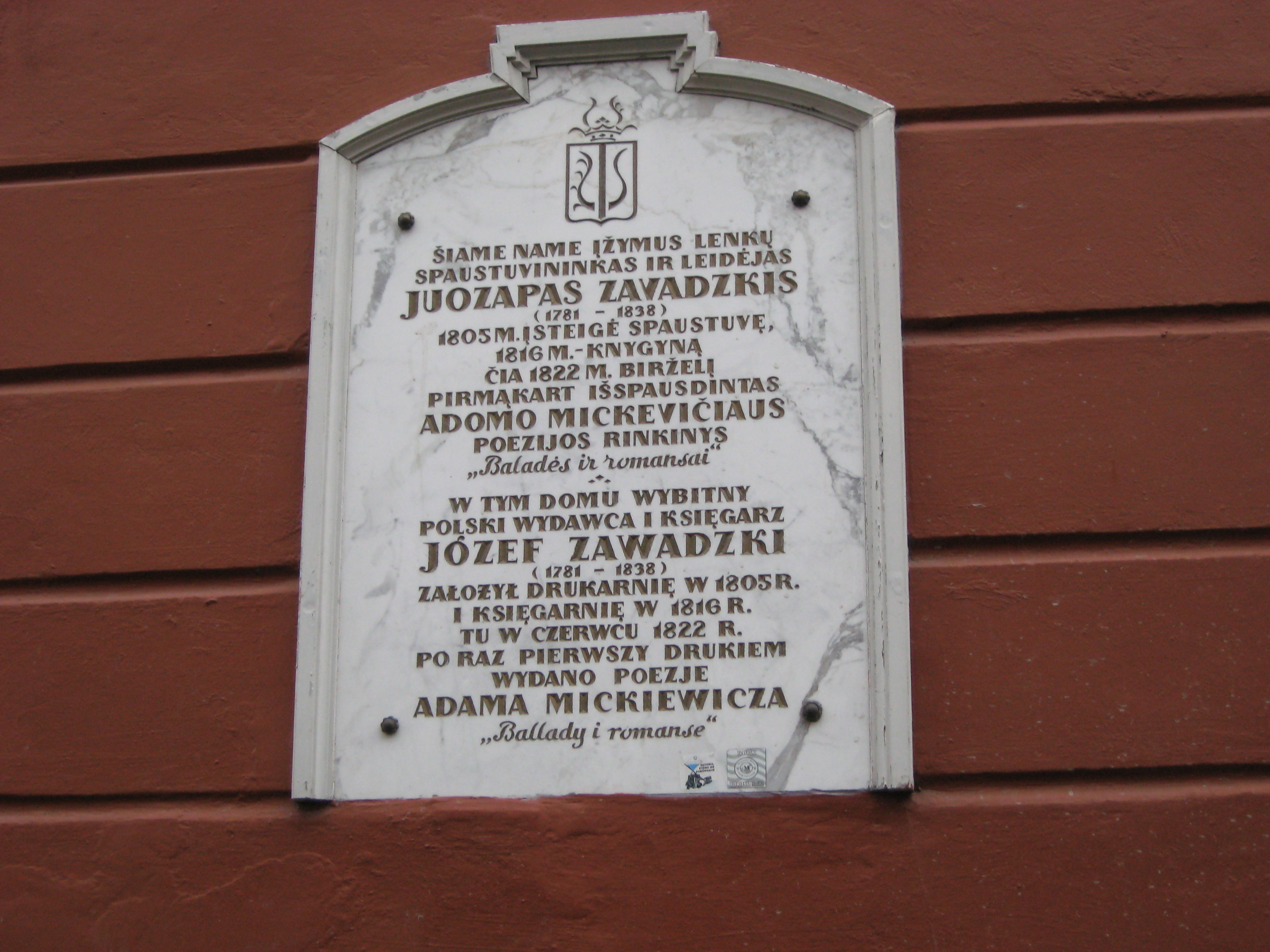
Commemorative plaque on the townhouse where Ballads and Romances were first published in 1822, Vilnius, Lithuania

Ballads and Romances are deeply rooted in historical and local realities. The setting of the events is precisely described and includes places like Świteź, Płużyny and Ruta. This familiar reality is confronted by the world of the supernatural in which everyday life is governed by unpredictable supernatural forces and the things considered to be known turn out to be dangerous and mysterious. The interference of such forces may have an ethical character, which judges human deeds, restores the moral order, encourages responsibility for one's actions and punishes for wrongdoings as exemplified in Lilije, Rybka, and Świtezianka ballads.

Such a view of reality in which the everyday world interacts with the supernatural and extrasensory one had a polemical character and was in stark contrast to the rational perspective adopted during the Age of Enlightenment. The ballad Romance (Polish: "Romantyczność") is, in particular, an example of the clash between the rationalism of the Enlightenment and the romantic vision of the world in which the faith in the extrarational understanding of reality and the existence of phenomena which are impossible to grasp by the human mind are postulated.

The descriptions of nature in Mickiewicz's ballads serve the purpose of introducing the atmosphere of mystery and horror. This is achieved through the depictions of the landscape which present its wilderness and quietness, the sound of the wind, the moonlight, a cemetery or an old tserkva. Literary critic, Czesław Zgorzelski, described Świteź, Świtezianka and Rybka as "rusalka-like" poems which "base the romantic uncanniness of the story on the supernatural metamorphoses which bind humans with nature".

Mickiewicz’s close friend Frederic Chopin’s ballades for piano may have been inspired by the ideas brought out in Ballads and Romances.

== List of ballads ==
Ballads and Romances consist of 14 ballads which appear in the following order:

- Romantyczność
- Pierwiosnek
- Świteź
- Świtezianka
- Rybka
- Powrót taty
- Kurhanek Maryli
- Do przyjaciół
- To lubię
- Rękawiczka
- Pani Twardowska
- Tukaj albo próby przyjaźni
- Lilije
- Dudarz

== See also ==
- Crimean Sonnets
- Polish poets
- Three Bards
