= Zavosse =

Village in Brest Region, Belarus

Zavosse Завоссе (Belarusian)
- Village
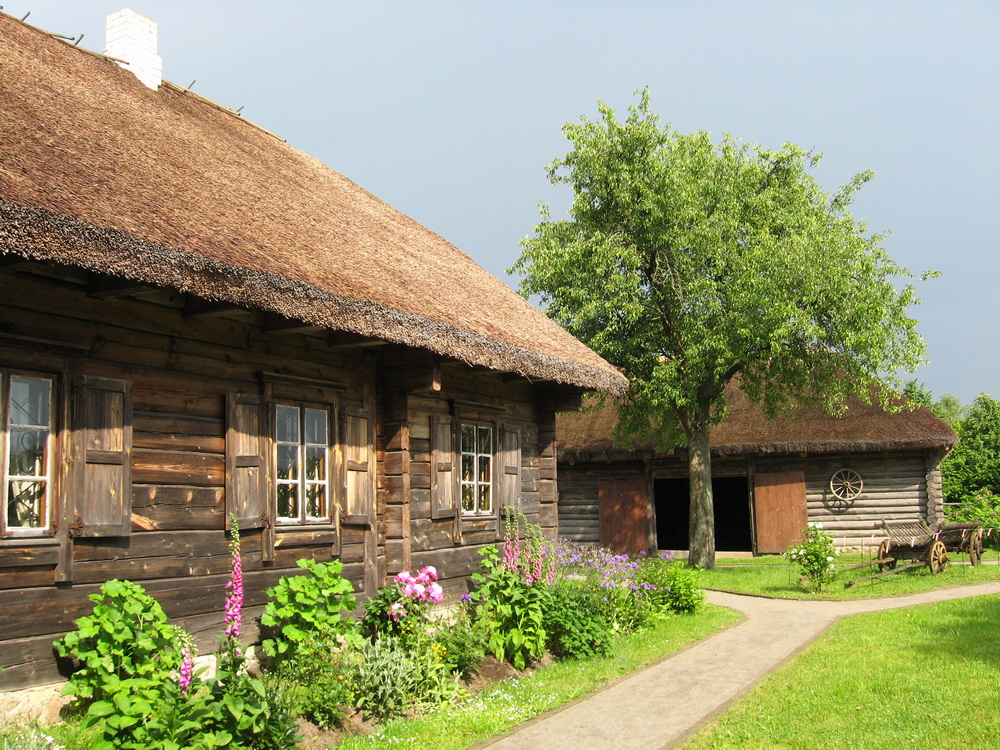
- Mickiewicz manor

- Location within Belarus
- Coordinates: 53°16′43″N 26°6′57″E
- Country: Belarus
- Region: Brest Region
- District: Baranavichy District
- Elevation: 184 m (604 ft)

Zavosse (Belarusian: Завоссе, romanized: Zavossie; Russian: Заосье, romanized: Zaosye; Polish: Zaosie) is a village in Baranavichy District, Brest Region, Belarus. It is part of Stalovichy selsoviet; it was previously part of Myadzyenyevichy selsoviet until 2013.

== History ==
The village was the site of a farm and manor house belonging to the Mickiewicz family and was the birthplace of Adam Mickiewicz, when, following the Third Partition of Poland in 1795, the area was part of the Russian Empire.

In 1806, the lands passed to the Stypułkowski family, and in 1831, were confiscated by the imperial government as punishment for Lucjan Stypułkowski's participation in the November Uprising. Between 1918 and 1939, the village was part of the Second Polish Republic, and in 1927, a monument to Mickiewicz was placed there. The manor and its surroundings were reconstructed in 1996.

== Notable people ==
- Adam Mickiewicz (1798–1855), Polish nationalist and poet
