= Crimean legends =

The interest in Crimean legends started at the end of the 19th century. The legends were published with a purpose of attraction of attracting tourism. Field work and publications of Crimean folklore were mostly done by non-professional folklorists. Therefore, it often happens that principles of classification of collected material are not known, and national origins of legends are not differentiated either.

== History ==
Legends specifically of the Crimean Tatars were published in 1937, others are attributed to Greek, Armenian, and Crimean Karaites. Most legends were collected in their original language, and were translated into Russian for publication. The nature of legend texts was influenced by translators/collectors’ professions and their cultural environment.

The most scientific approach for collecting legends was shown in the 1920s and 1930s, when scientific expeditions were supported by Communist party, which had just come to power and started to support cultural development of national minorities. However, after Stalin's repressions and deportation of Crimean Tatars, folklore became a subject for editing according to ideological demands of that time. It made the Soviet-era treatment of folklore a specific phenomenon in its own right, which is worthy of separate research.

When the Soviet Union collapsed, Crimean legends continued to be published commercially. Apart from such publications for the popular market, national societies also took to publishing collections of legends.

== See also ==
- History of Crimea
- Crimean Goths
- Crimean Tatars
- Crimean Karaites
- The Crimean Sonnets
