= Mickievič =

Mickievič (Belarusian: Міцкевіч, romanized: Mitskevich) is a gender-neutral Belarusian-language surname. It is derived from the given name Mićko/Mićka (Belarusian: Міцько/Міцька), a diminutive of Dzmitryj (Belarusian: Дзмітрый).

Other forms: Belarusian (Old Łacinka), Polish: Mickiewicz; Lithuanianized: Mickevičius, Belarusian, Russian: Mitskevich (transliteration from Cyrillic alphabet).

Notable people with the surname include:

- Anatoliy Petrovych Mitskevich, real name of the Soviet writer Anatoly Dneprov
- Danila Mickievič, Belarusian cultural worker, chemist. Son of Yakub Kolas
- Kanstancin Mickievič, birth name of Yakub Kolas
- Mikalaj Mickievič, Belarusian chemist
- Michaś Mickievič, Belarusian scientist, The younger son of Yakub Kolas
- Uladzimir Mickievič, Belarusian Communist Party and state official
