= Vincas Mickevičius =

Vincas Mickevičius was the birth name of two notable Lithuanians:

- Vincas Krėvė-Mickevičius (1882–1954), writer
- Vincas Mickevičius-Kapsukas (1880–1935), communist activist
