= Adam Mickiewicz Museum of Literature =

Coordinates: 52°15′01″N 21°0′45″E

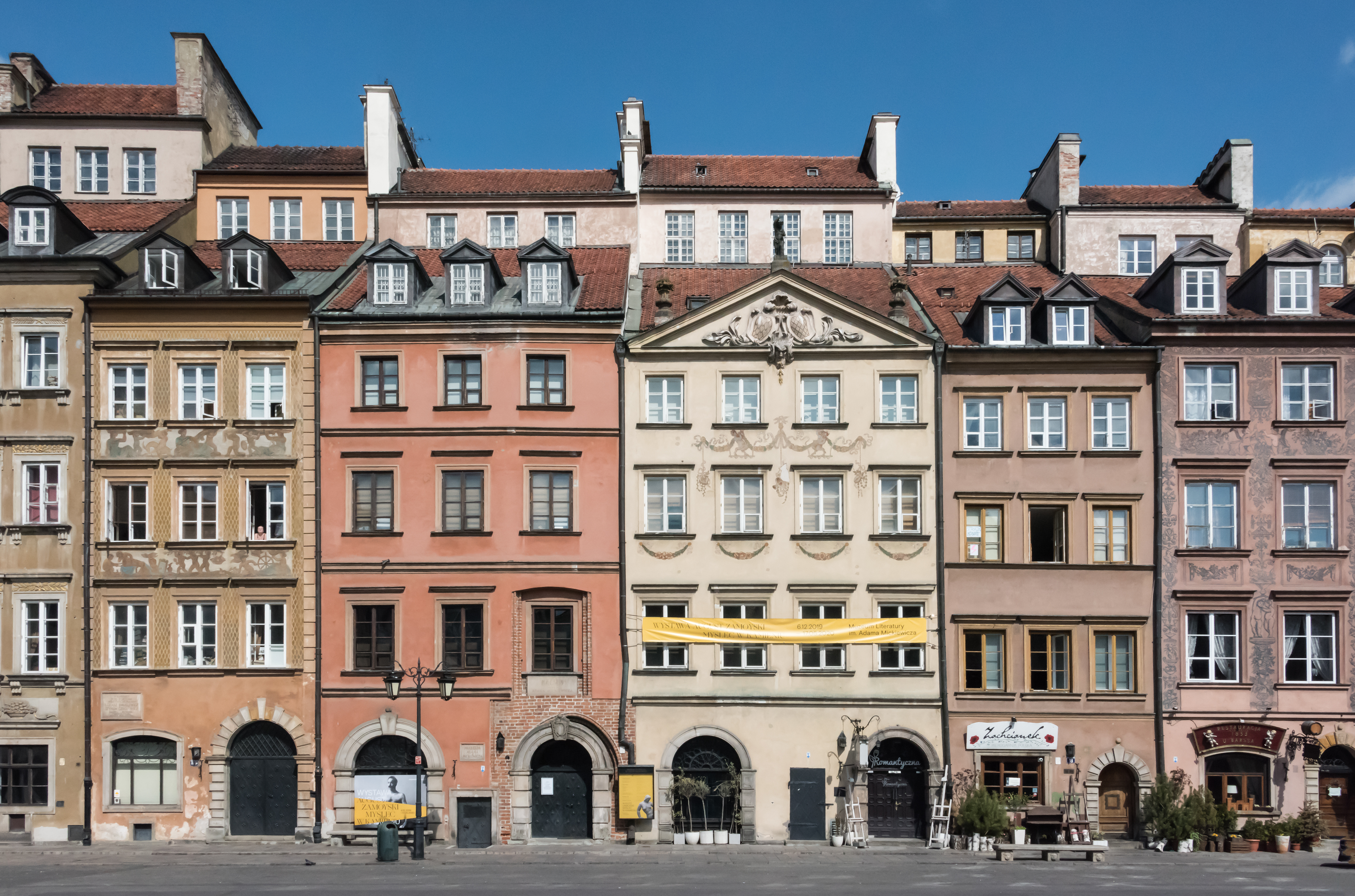
- Established: 1950
- Location: Old Town Market Place, Warsaw; Warsaw, Poland
- Type: Literary museum
- Website: www.muzeumliteratury.pl

The Adam Mickiewicz Museum of Literature (Polish: Muzeum Literatury im. Adama Mickiewicza w Warszawie) is a museum named for noted Polish poet and essayist Adam Mickiewicz in Warsaw, Poland. It was established in 1950.

The museum contains manuscripts and historical artefacts connected with Mickiewicz and also has some exhibits which are related to other major Polish writers.
