= Walenty Wańkowicz =

Polish painter (1799–1842)

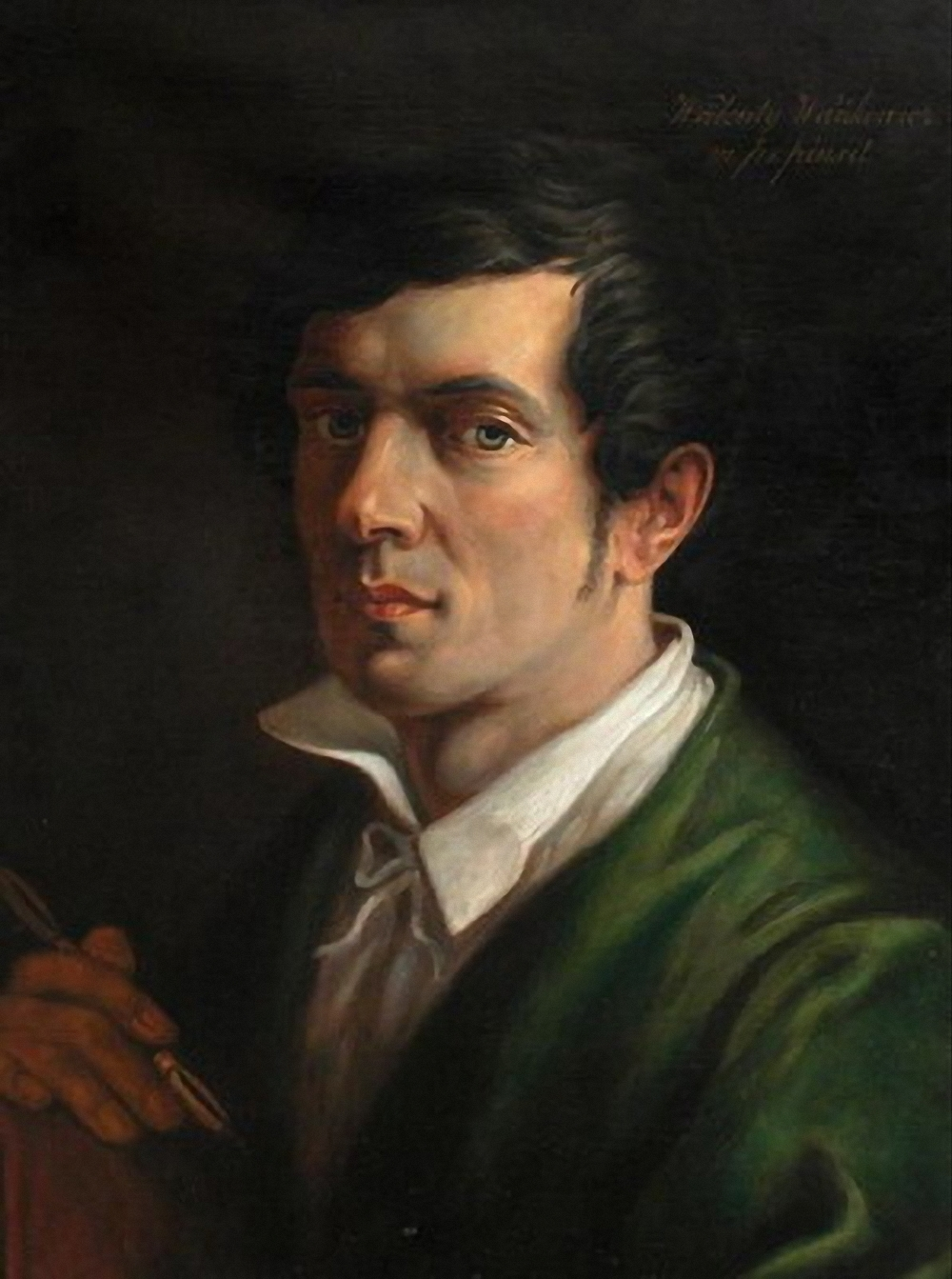
Self-portrait

Walenty Wilhelm Wańkowicz (February 14, 1799 in Kałużyce - May 12, 1842 in Paris) was a Polish painter. He studied at the Jesuit College in Polotsk, the University of Wilno and the Imperial Academy of Arts in St. Petersburg. He produced, among other things, a well-known portrait of Adam Mickiewicz (1827–28).

== Legacy ==
Wańkowicz is honored in Belarus as one of the most important 19th-century painters of Belarusian origin. There is a monument to him in Minsk.

The Vankovich House / Wańkowicz House, the former mansion of the Wańkowicz family, is now a museum in the historical part of Minsk.

== Selected portraits ==
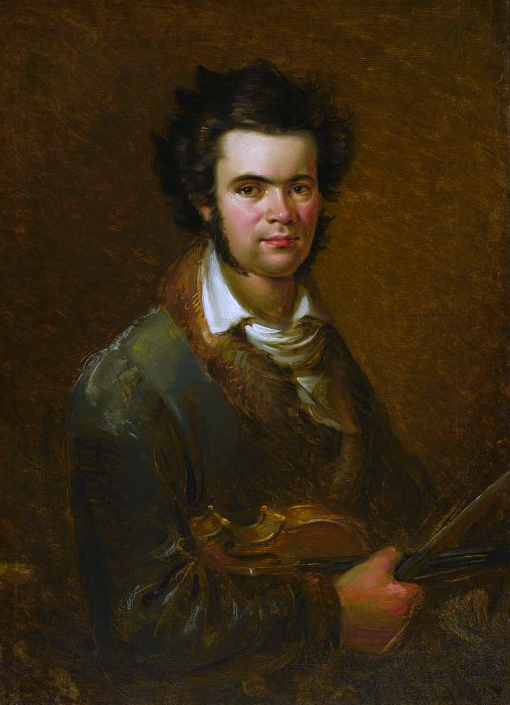
Karol Lipiński (1822)

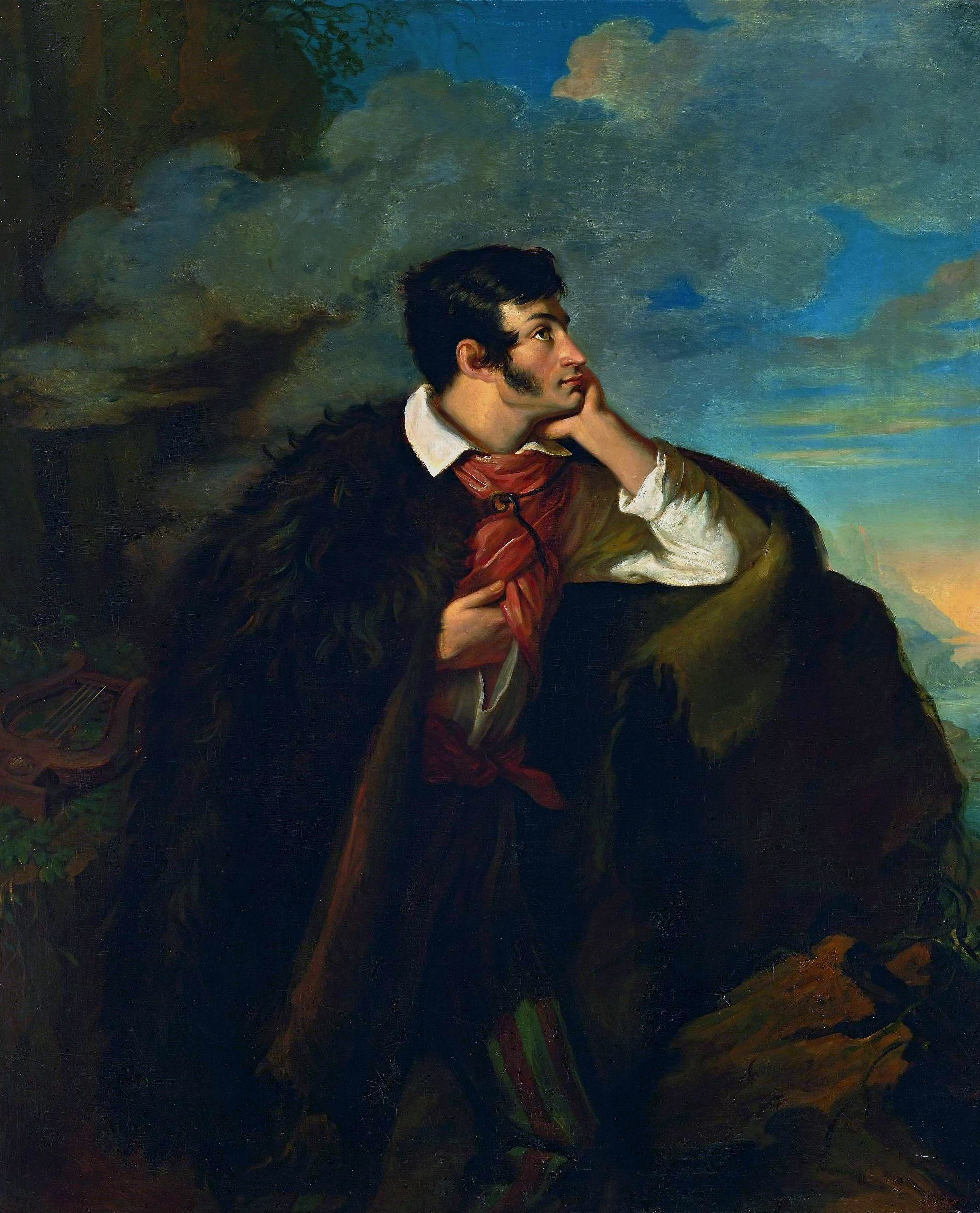
Adam Mickiewicz (1828)

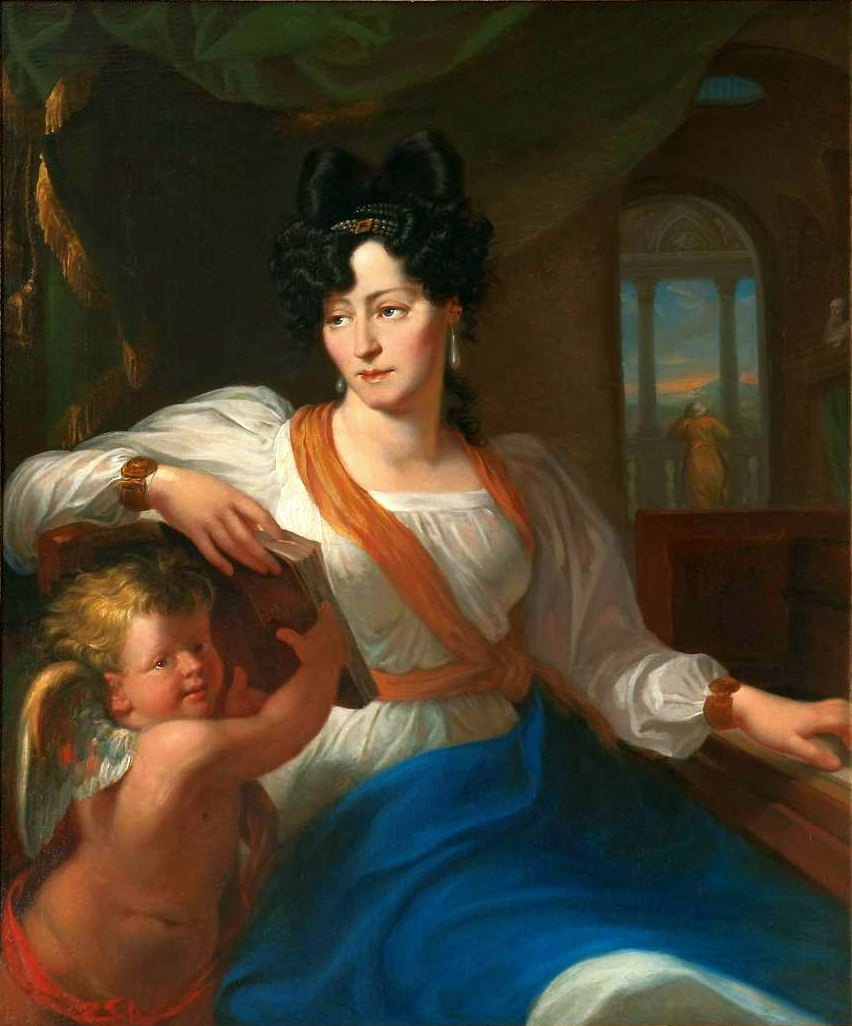
Maria Szymanowska (1828)

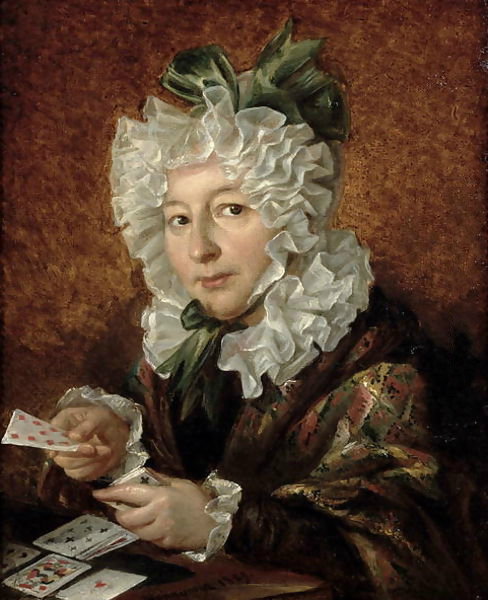
Woman Playing Solitaire (1829)

== Sources ==
- M. Domański, Walenty Wańkowicz - artysta i przyjaciel Mickiewicza, "Rota", 1997 nr 4.
- Jan Marek Giżycki, Materyały do dziejów Akademii Połockiej i szkół od niej zależnych, 1905

== See also ==
- List of painters by name
- List of Poles
