= The Crimean Sonnets =

Series of Polish sonnets by Adam Mickiewicz

Crimean Sonnets
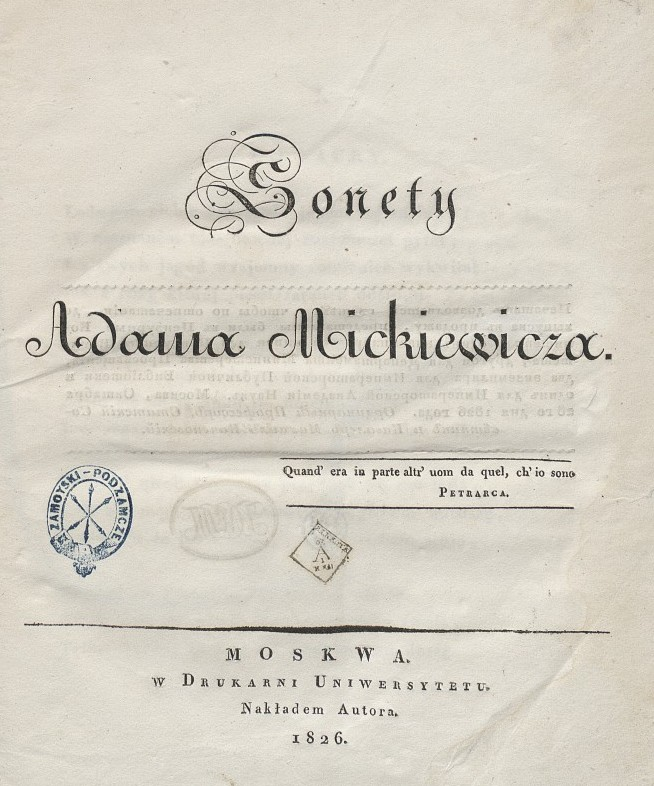
- First edition
- Author: Adam Mickiewicz
- Original title: Sonety
- Language: Polish
- Genre: poetry
- Publication date: 1826
- Publication place: Russian Empire
- English publication date: 1917

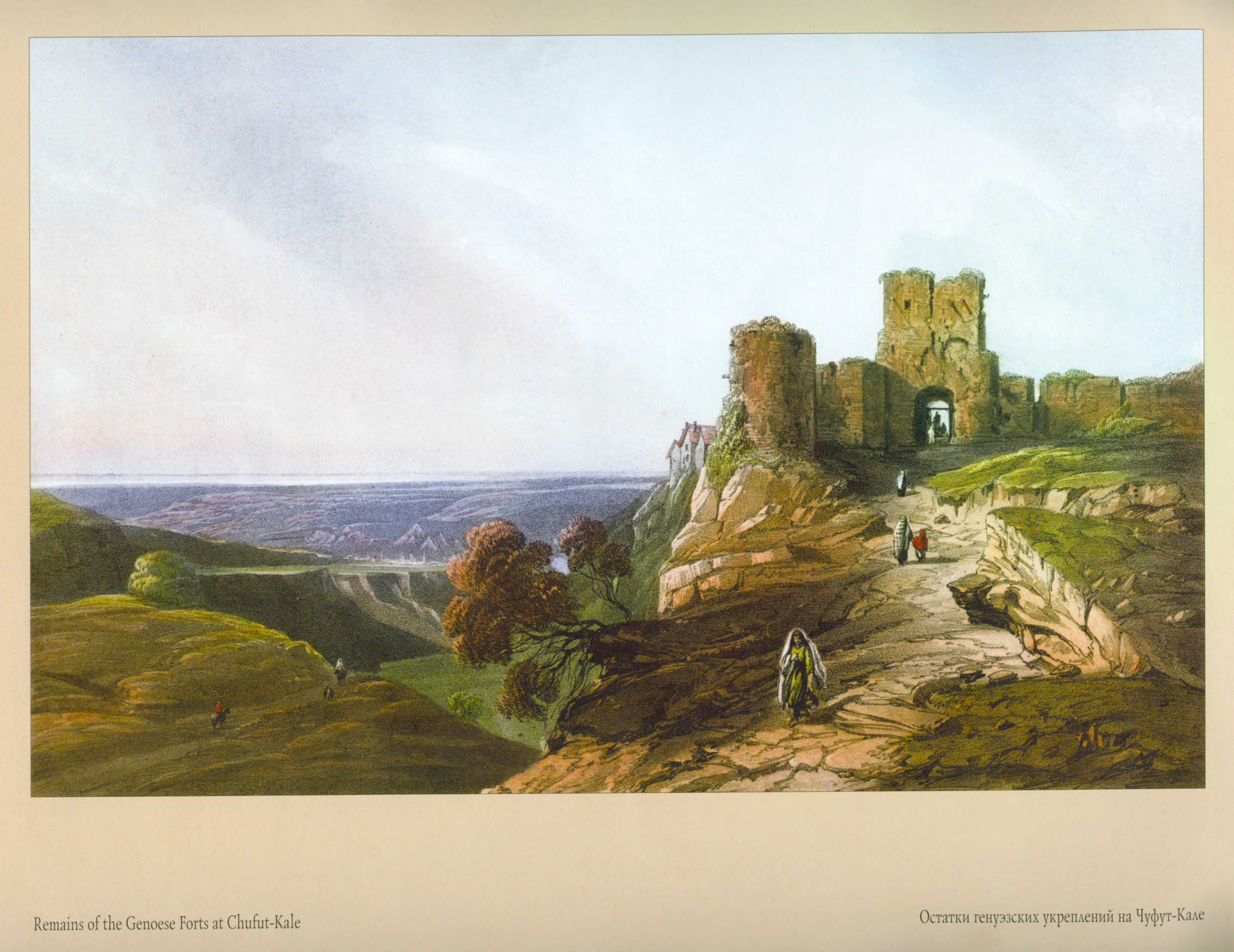
The Remains of the Fortifications in Chufut-Kale, a painting by Carlo Bossoli (1856) depicting a place which inspired one of Mickiewicz's sonnets

The Crimean Sonnets (Sonety krymskie) are a series of 18 Polish sonnets by Adam Mickiewicz, constituting an artistic telling of a journey through the Crimea. They were published in 1826, together with a cycle of love poems called "The Odessan Sonnets" (Sonety Odeskie), in a collection called "Sonnets" (Sonety).

== Importance ==
The Crimean Sonnets is an expression of Mickiewicz's interest in the Orient, shared by many of the students of the University of Vilnius. Involuntarily residing in Russia, Mickiewicz left Odessa and went on a journey, which turned out to be a trek to another world, his first initiation into "the East". The Crimean Sonnets are romantic descriptions of oriental nature and culture of the East which show the despair of the poet—a pilgrim, an exile longing for the homeland, driven from his home by a violent enemy.

The Crimean Sonnets is considered the first sonnet cycle in Polish literature and a significant example of early romanticism in Poland, which gave rise to the huge popularity of this genre in Poland and inspired many Polish poets of the Romantic era as well as the Young Poland period.

The Crimean Sonnets were published in an English translation by Edna Worthley Underwood in 1917. A classic Russian rendition of one of the sonnets belongs to Mikhail Lermontov. In 2021, an English translation by Kevin Kearney was published in Cardinal Points, Volume 11: this particular rendition remains faithful to the Petrarchan sonnet form and emulates the thirteen syllable line of the Polish originals by using the twelve syllable English hexameter line.

== List of sonnets ==
- Stepy akermańskie ("The Ackerman Steppe")
- Cisza morska ("The Calm of the Sea")
- Żegluga ("Sailing")
- Burza ("The Storm")
- Widok gór ze stepów Kozłowa ("Mountains from the Keslov Steppe")
- Bakczysaraj ("Baktschi Serai")
- Bakczysaraj w nocy ("Baktschi Serai by Night")
- Grób Potockiej ("The Grave of Countess Potocka")
- Mogiły Haremu ("The Graves of the Harem")
- Bajdary ("Baydary")
- Ałuszta w dzień ("Alushta by Day")
- Ałuszta w nocy ("Alushta by Night")
- Czatyrdah ("Tschatir Dagh")
- Pielgrzym ("The Pilgrim")
- Droga nad przepaścią w Czufut-Kale ("The Pass Across the Abyss in Chufut-Kale")
- Góra Kikineis ("The Kikineis Mountain")
- Ruiny zamku w Bałakławie ("The Ruins of Balaklava")
- Ajudah ("On Juda's Cliff")

== See also ==
- Crimean legends
- Polish literature
- Polish poets
