= Adam Mickiewicz Museum, Istanbul =

Biographical museum in Istanbul, Turkey

Adam Mickiewicz Museum
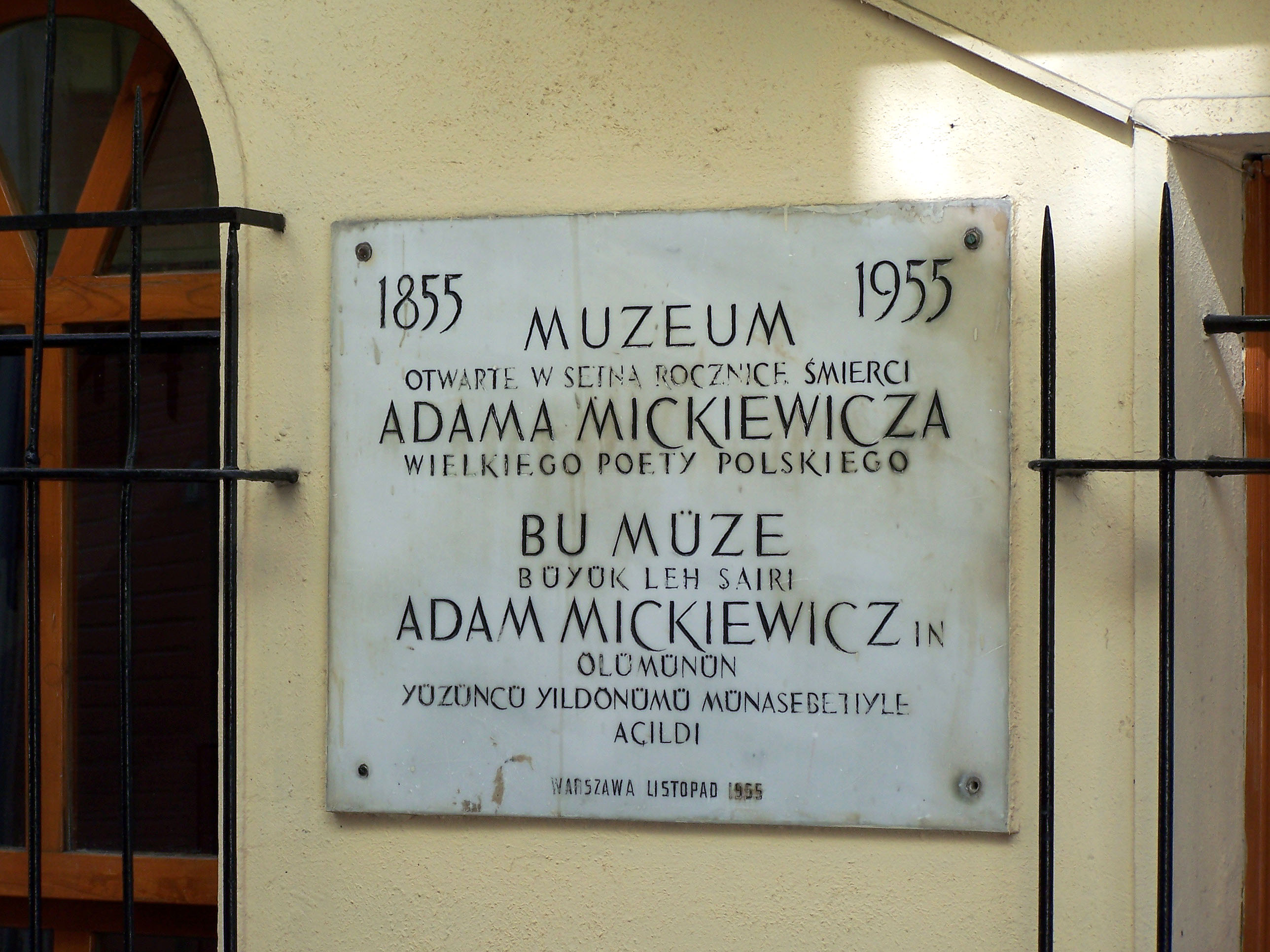
- Plaque at Adam Mickiewicz Museum
- Established: 1955
- Location: Dolapdere, 23 Tatlı Badem Str., Beyoğlu, Istanbul, Turkey
- Coordinates: 41.038777°N 28.977100°E
- Type: Biographical

Adam Mickiewicz Museum (Polish: Muzeum Adama Mickiewicza, Turkish: Adam Mickiewicz Müzesi) is a historic house museum dedicated to the life of Adam Mickiewicz, renowned Polish poet. It is located in the district of Beyoğlu, on the European side of Istanbul, Turkey.

It is located in a house where Adam Mickiewicz lived and died. Mickiewicz came to Turkey in September 1855 to help organize Polish forces under the Ottoman Army. He befriended Michał Czajkowski (Sadık Paşa) who commanded the Polish forces there. Mickiewicz died from illness on 26 November 1855.

The house was renovated after a fire in 1870. The museum was opened in 1955 with the help of the Museum of Literature in Warsaw. The crypt where Mickiewicz was temporarily buried for the period of one month is located in the basement.

The museum houses some manuscripts of Adam Mickiewicz, historical documents and paintings.

== See also ==
- Stanisław Julian Ostroróg
