= Szymanowski =

Ślepowron coat of arms used by some of Szymanowski family

The Szymanowski family is the Polish noble family, who, according to composer Karol Szymanowski's exacting biographer, Teresa Chylińska, owned village of Szymany in Masovia of present day Podlaskie Voivodeship which has been inherited by Mikołaj (Nicholas) Szymanowski (died before 1544). The family later moved to the Rawa Voivodeship from where they spread into Masovia. Some branches of the family used different coat of arms such as: Gozdawa, Lubicz, Ślepowron or Topór coat of arms.

== Surname ==
Szymanowski (feminine: Szymanowska; plural: Szymanowscy) is also a Polish surname.

== Notable people ==
- Alexander Szymanowski (born 1988), Argentine footballer
- Antoni Szymanowski (born 1951), Polish footballer
- Barbara Szymanowska, Polish diplomat, ambassador of Poland to Vietnam and Indonesia
- Celina Szymanowska (1812–1855), daughter of Maria
- Ernst Biberstein born Ernst Szymanowski (1899–1986), German SS-Obersturmbannführer
- Filipina Brzezińska-Szymanowska (1800–1886), Polish pianist and composer
- Henryk Szymanowski (born 1952), Polish football manager and player
- Julius von Szymanowski (1829–1868), Russian surgeon of Polish-German origin, professor at the University of Helsinki and University of Kiev
- Karol Szymanowski (1882–1937), Polish composer
- Maria Szymanowska (1789–1831), Polish composer
- Marianela Szymanowski (born 1990), Argentine footballer, sister of Alexander
- Natalia Korwin-Szymanowska (1858–1922), Polish writer and translator
- Theodore de Korwin Szymanowski (1846–1901), Polish writer
- Wacław Szymanowski (1859–1930), Polish sculptor
- Wiktoryna Szymanowska (1835–1874), Polish actress
- Zofia Szymanowska–Lenartowicz (1825–1870), Polish painter, musician, and poet
- Korwin-Szymanowski family, a Polish noble family
