= Teofil Lenartowicz =

Polish ethnographer, sculptor, poet (1822–1893)

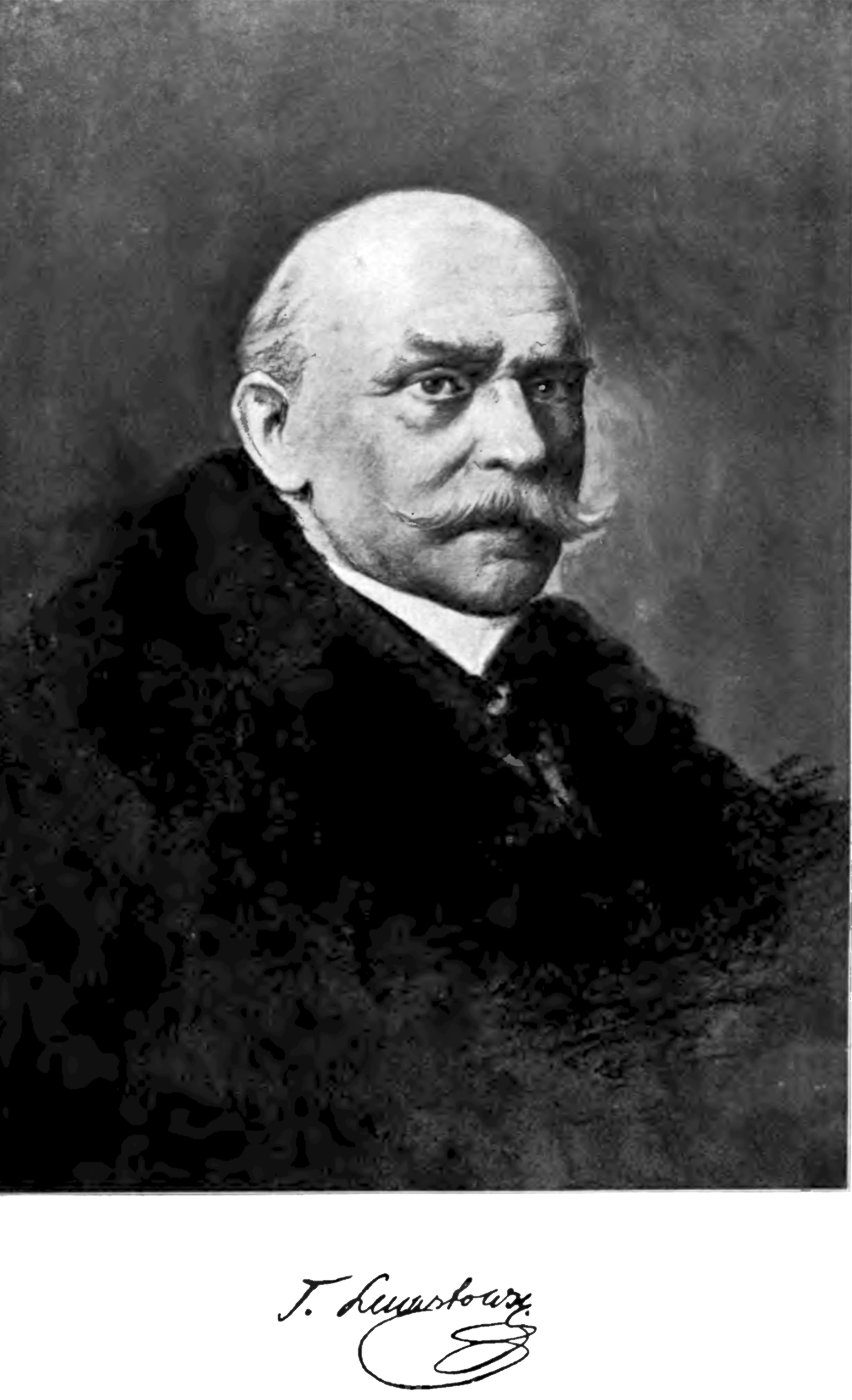
- Born: 27 February 1822; Warsaw, Congress Kingdom of Poland (now Poland)
- Died: 3 February 1893 (aged 70); Florence, Italy
- Occupations: Poet, publicist, ethnographer
- Spouse: Zofia Szymanowska (m. 1861–1870; her death)
- Children: 1
- Writing career
- Movement: Romanticism

Teofil Aleksander Lenartowicz (27 February 1822 in Warsaw – 3 February 1893 in Florence) was a Polish ethnographer, sculptor, poet and Romantic conspirator. Linked to Bohemians among Warsaw intellectuals, Lenartowicz was associated with Oskar Kolberg and Roman Zmorski in the anti-Tsarist independence movement, and participated in the Greater Poland Uprising of 1848 during his stay in Kraków. While in exile he taught Slavic literature at the University of Bologna, composed patriotic and religious poems, as well as lyrical and historical epics based on the folklore of his beloved region of Mazowsze. He did portrait-sculptures, and designed tombstones.

== Early life and family ==
Teofil Aleksander came from the master mason family of Lenartowicz Pobóg coat of arms. He was the son of Karol and Maria née Kwasieborska Cholewa coat of arms.

While in Florence, Italy in 1861, he married painter Zofia Szymanowska, with whom he had one son. Their son John (Jan) died shortly after his birth in 1867, and was buried in Attigliano, Italy.

== Literature ==
Owing to his fascination with the folklore of the Polish Masovia (which Lenartowicz used as the chief motif of his poetry), he used to call himself Mazurzyna, a versifier of Masovia region. He was friends with Elżbieta Bośniacka, a playwright, poet and journalist associated with Dziennik Literacki.

The best-known of his poems is "The Golden Cup" ("Złoty kubek", 1853), based on a traditional Polish Christmas carol, in which an orphaned girl asks the heavenly goldsmith to make her a golden cup from golden apples and leaves fallen from the golden apple-tree. The cup is to be decorated with engravings depicting the idealized Polish countryside. Because of its symbolism of transcendent light, the poem can be interpreted in different ways, including as advice on art-making. It was favorably received by Norwid, as well as by Maria Pawlikowska-Jasnorzewska, who wrote a poem, "Lenartowicz," about the concept of his "Golden Cup".

He published two collections of poetry: Lirenka and Zachwycenie (Rapture, 1855). Among his many notable poems, Teofil Lenartowicz wrote also: "Dwaj Towiańczycy" (The two followers of Towiański), in which he describes the death of his former co-conspirators Michał Szweycer (Ludwik Szwejcer) and Adolf Rozwadowski; "Moje strony" (My homeland), "Rosła kalina" (Hearty viburnum), "Tęsknota" (Longing), "Wiersz do poezji" (Poem to poetry), "Duch sieroty" (Spirit of an orphan), "Jan Kochanowski", "Lirnik. Baśń" (A minstrel. Tale), "Łzy" (Tears), "Czajka", "Pustota" (Emptiness), "O powrocie do kraju" (On the return to the country), "Zaproszenie" (Invitation), and "Staruszek" (Old Man).

Poland's eminent poet Czesław Miłosz described Lenartowicz's longer poems "Zachwycenie" ("Rapture") and "Błogosławiona" ("The Blessed One"), both published in 1855, as having a "curious treatment of religious themes." The heaven encountered by a departing soul is expected to look just like a village in Poland.

Between 1888 and 1893, Lenartowicz was an honorary member of the Poznań Society of the Friends of Science, according to Bolesław Erzepki in 1896.

== Death ==
Lenartowicz died on 3 February 1893 in Florence, and his remains were brought from Italy to Poland and interred in the Crypt of the Distinguished in the St. Stanislaus Church at Skałka in Kraków.

== See also ==
- Mizerna cicha, a song written by Lenartowicz
