= Ghraoui Chocolate =

Damascene chocolatier

- Company type: Privately held company
- Industry: Confectionery production
- Founded: 1805
- Founder: Ghraoui family
- Headquarters: Szabadság tér 7, 1054, Budapest, Hungary
- Area served: Worldwide
- Key people: Mohammad Mosalam Midani, CEO
- Products: Food and beverage (chocolate and confectionery)
- Website: www.ghraouichocolate.com

Ghraoui Chocolate /ɡrɑːoʊi/ is a Damascene chocolatier established in 1805 and currently headquartered in Budapest, Hungary.

== History ==
Ghraoui was established in Damascus in 1805 by an ancient trading family of the same name.

The Ghraouis joined forces with Syria’s first industrial-scale canning company for fruit and vegetables, making this 20th-century venture a success story in Europe and America, as well.

It was the first company to introduce chocolate to the Middle East in 1931. A french chocolatier was hired to create sweets of the highest quality. During the 1930s and 1940s, Ghraoui gained the title of Purveyor to Her Majesty, the Queen of England.

In the 1930s, Ghraoui was stocked at such luxury stores as Paris's Fauchon and Hédiard, and London's Fortnum & Mason and Harrods.

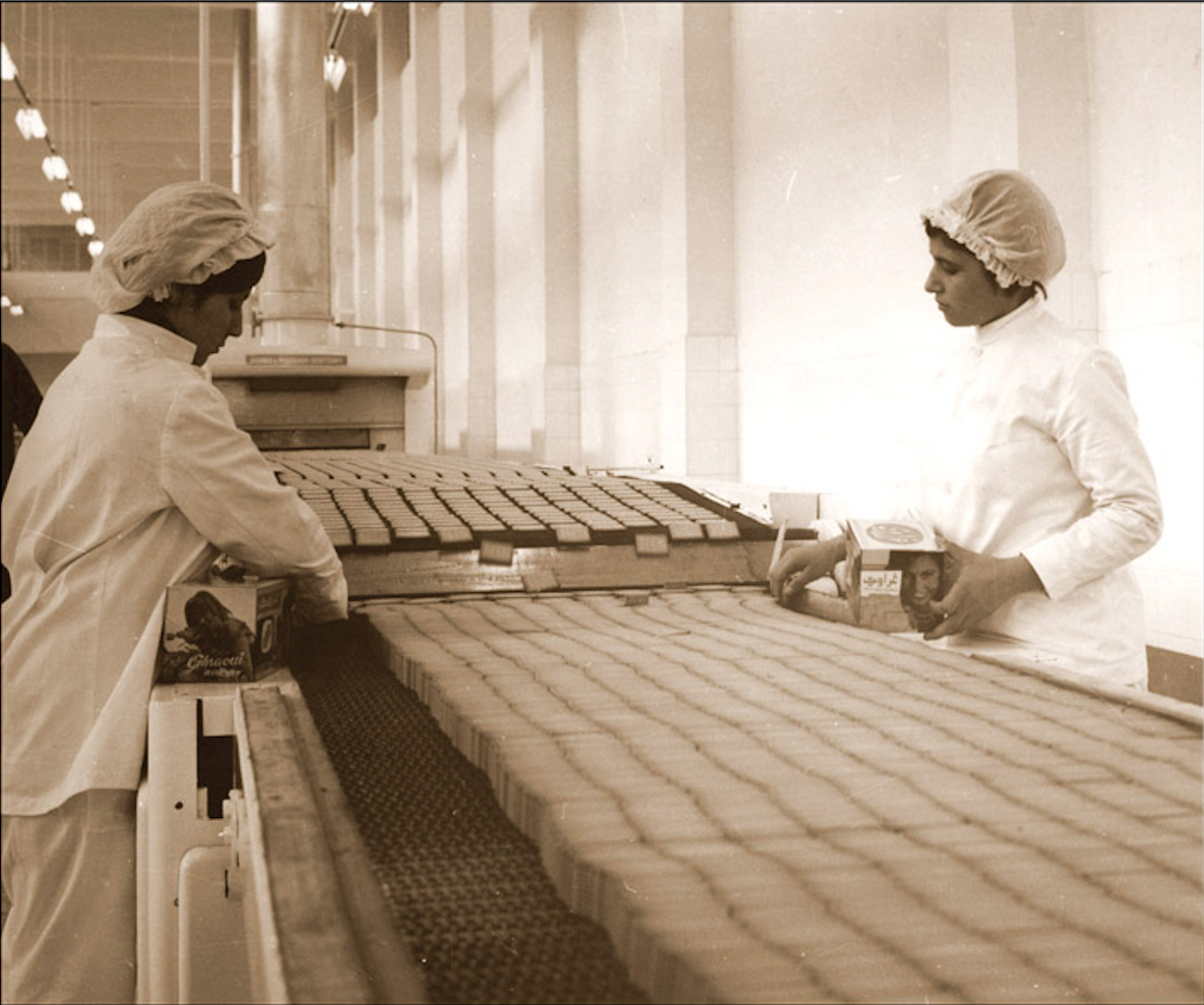
Workers at Ghraoui Chocolate in 1966

Not only is the factory machinery painted orange, but the brand's packaging, including its bags and its delivery vans.

Forced to shut down due to the Syrian civil war, Ghraoui relaunched in 2017 from Budapest, Hungary.

== Awards ==
Ghraoui received numerous accolades and awards, including gold medals, from Paris to New York acknowledging their dedication to high quality and excellence.

The company earned the ‘Diplôme de Médaille d'Argent’ at the Beyrouth fair in 1921, the ‘Diplôme d' Honneur’ in 1931, and the 'Médaille d'Or' in 1939 at the Paris fair. In 1939 in New York City Ghraoui was also awarded ‘Diplôme d' Honneur’.

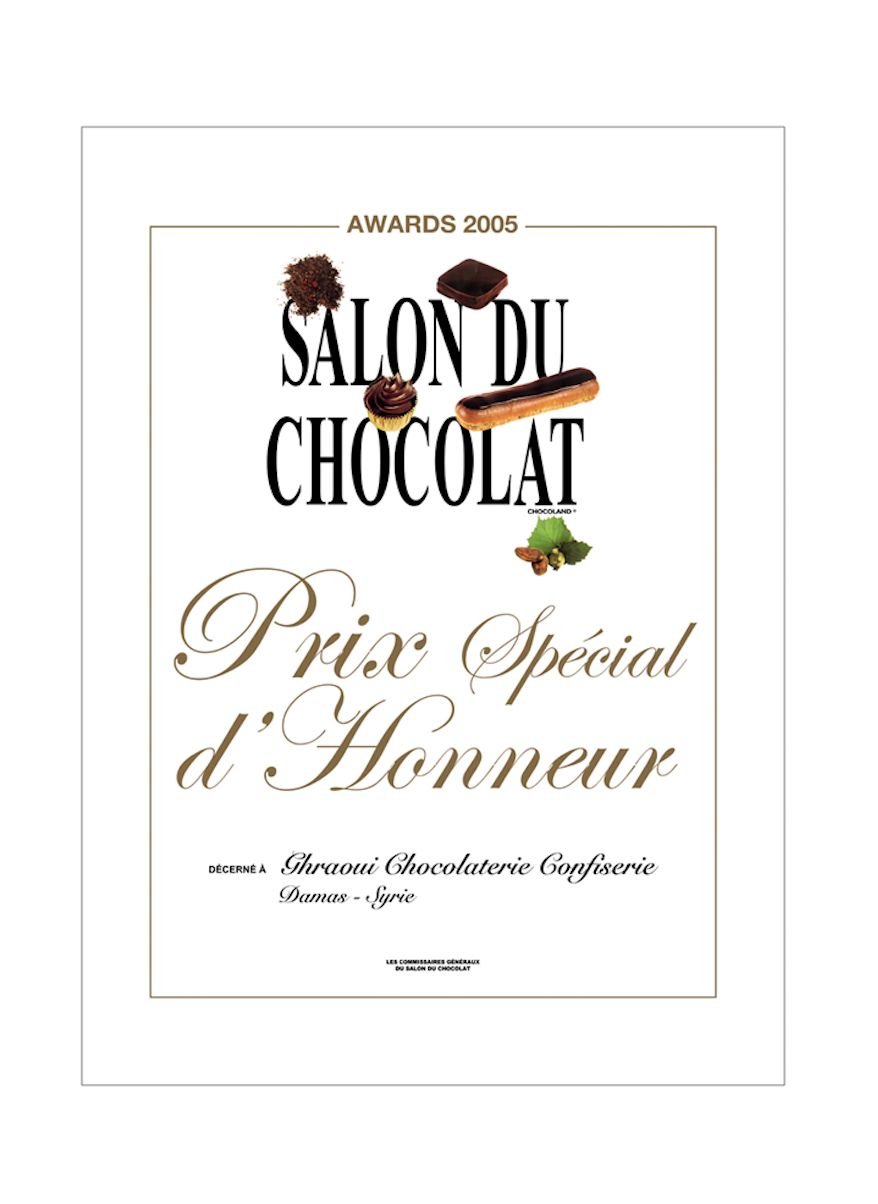
Prix d'Honneur award at the 2005 Salon du Chocolat fair

In 2005, Ghraoui chocolate's Orangettes were awarded the ‘Prix d’honneur’ award at the Salon du Chocolat, Paris.

== Locations ==
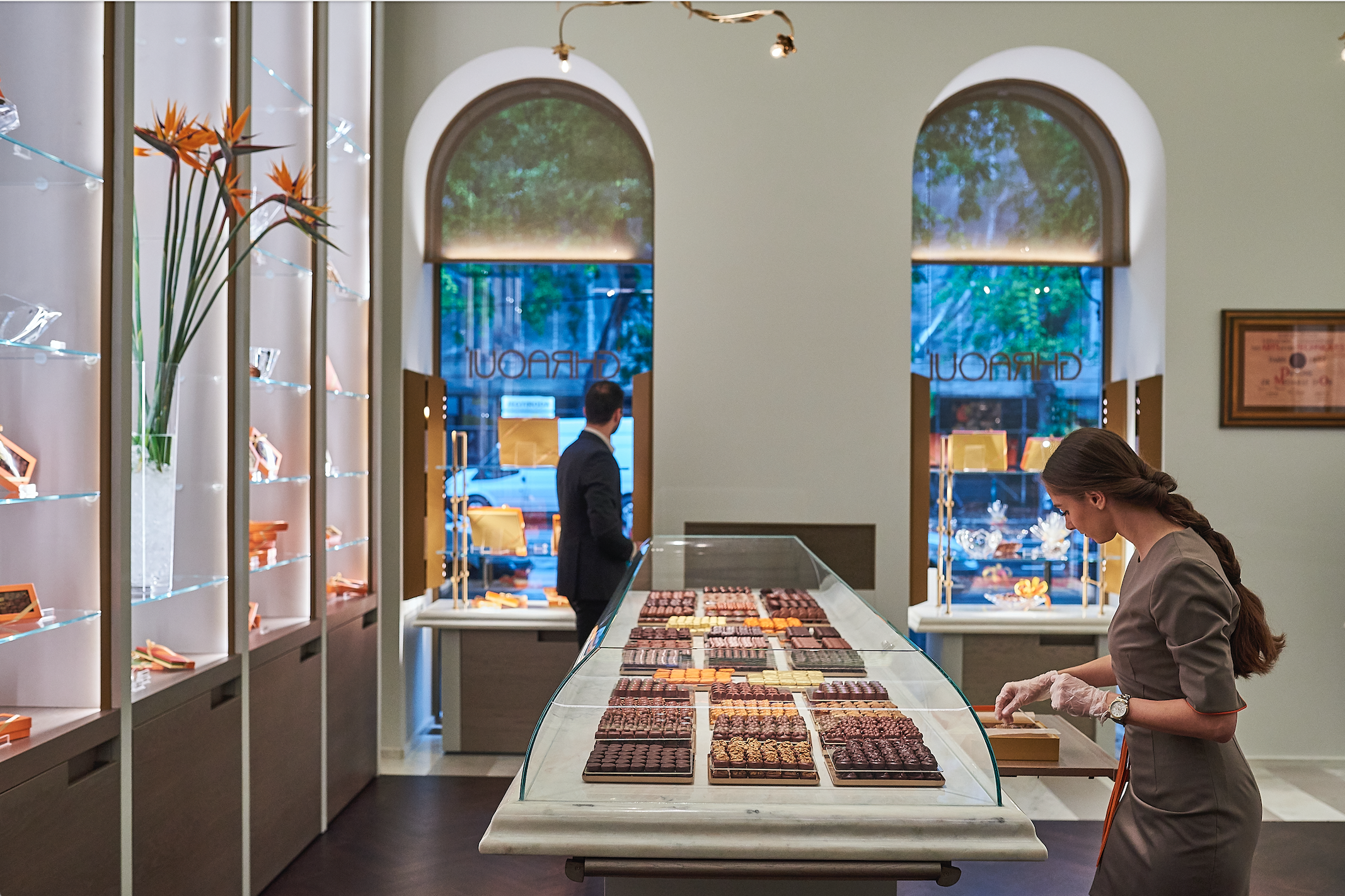
Budapest store

There are currently 7 boutiques in operation.

- Budapest, Hungary
- Doha, Qatar | Villaggio Mall & Place Vendome Mall & Landmark mall
- Abu Dhabi, UAE |
- Dubai, UAE | Dubai Mall
- Damascus, Syria

== Gallery ==
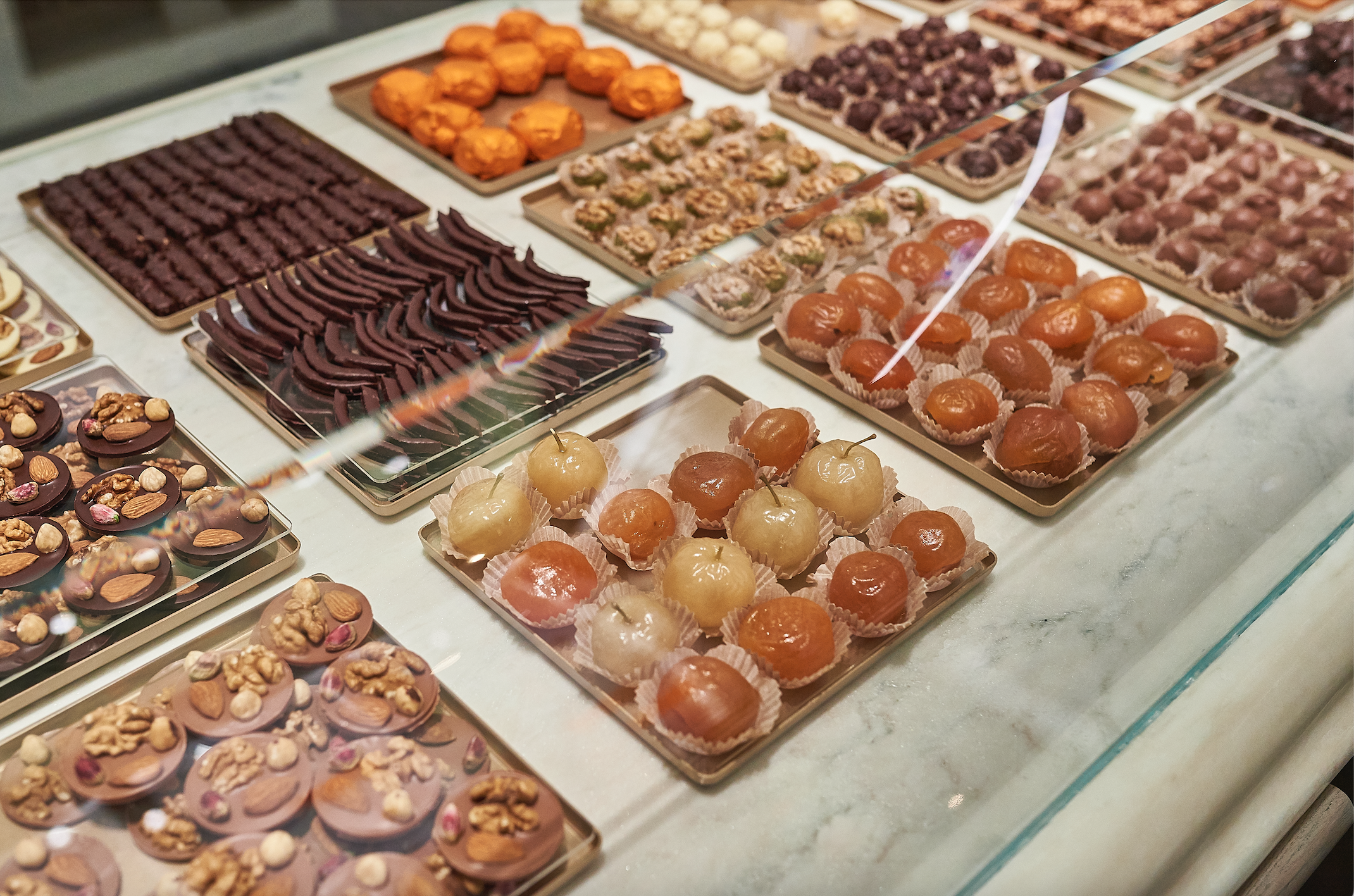
Candied fruits at Ghraoui Budapest
