= Korwin-Szymanowski =

Korwin-Szymanowski is a surname. Notable people with the surname include:

- Korwin-Szymanowski family, name of ancient heritage in Greater Poland
- Theodore de Korwin Szymanowski (1846–1901), Polish nobleman and landowner
