= Amaliegade 41 =

Building in Copenhagen

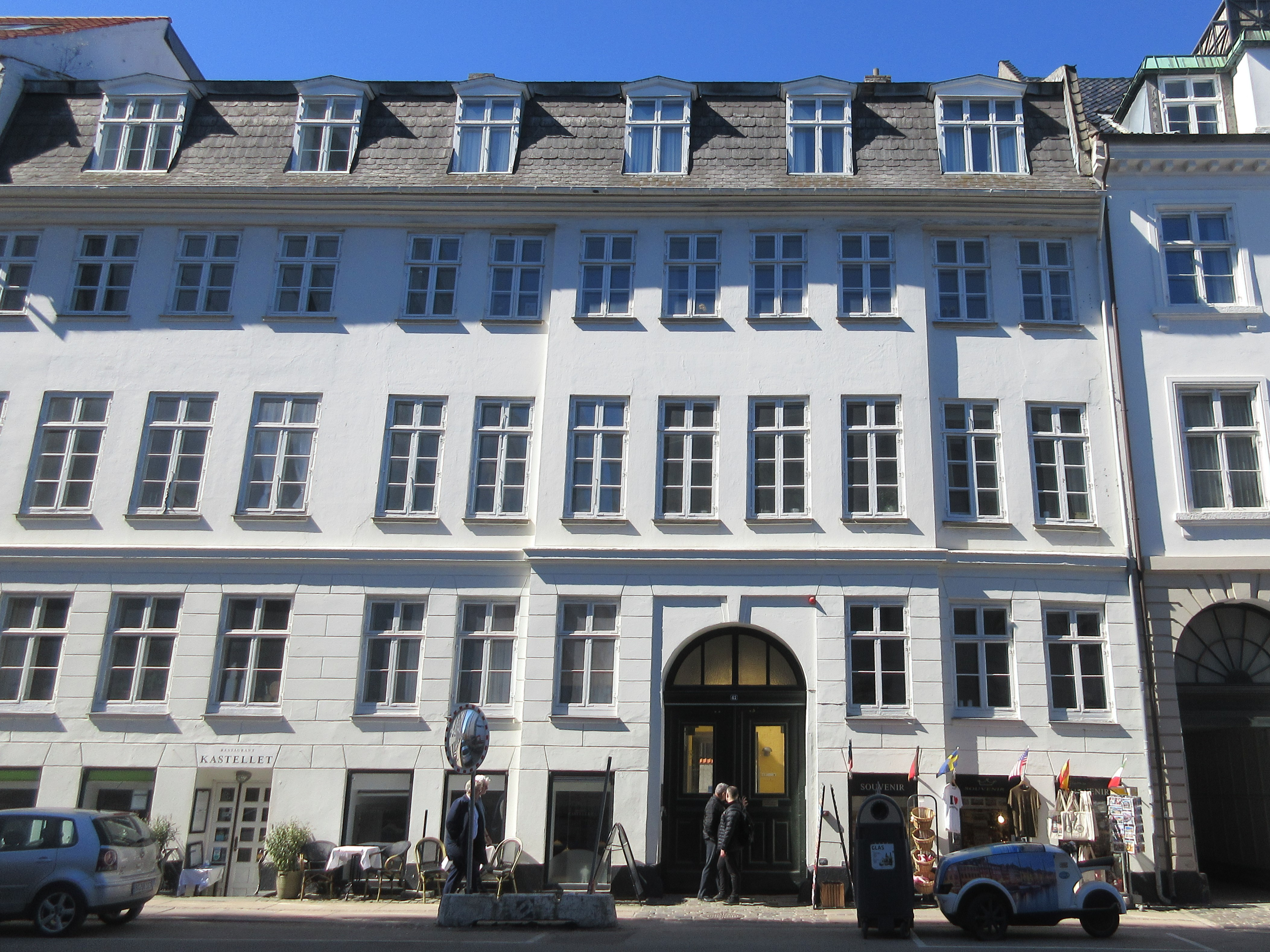
- Amaliegade 41 in April 2926.
- Interactive map of the Amaliegade 41 area

General information
- Architectural style: C. F. Harsdorff/Frederik Beckmann
- Location: Copenhagen, Denmark
- Coordinates: 55°41′14.28″N 12°35′44.3″E
- Completed: 1783/1788

Amaliegade 41 is a Neoclassical property in the Frederiksstaden district of central Copenhagen, Denmark. It was listed on the Danish registry of protected buildings and places in 1951.

== History ==
=== Oeder's botanical garden ===
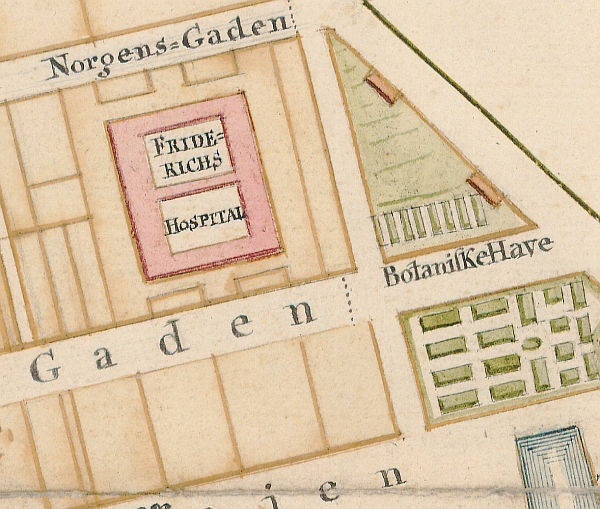
Oeder's Botanical Garden in Amaliegade

Copenhagen's second botanical garden was situated at the site from 1752. It was created by Georg Christian Oeder in the newly founded Frederiksstaden district at the request of Frederik V, at a site bisected by Amaliegade just north of Frederik's Hospital. The smaller western section, covering just under half a hectare, was equipped with a greenhouse while the eastern section remained largely unplanted. The garden was opened to the public in 1763. The area was reacquired by the king after eight years and the botanical garden was then moved to Gammelholm. The site on the western side of Amaliegade was subsequently used as a storage space for a while for sandstone from Bornholm and marble from Norway.

=== C. F. Harsdorff and Frederik Beckmann ===
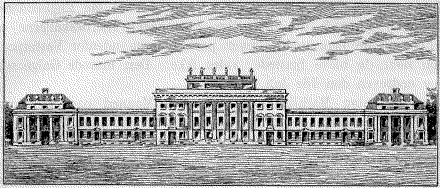
Harsdorff's first proposal for the site

In 1781, Caspar Frederik Harsdorff was presented with the former botanical garden in Amaliegade on the condition that he would build it over with "good and permanent buildings with beautiful facades within a period of no more than eight years". Harsdorff's first proposal for the site—a terrace with eight symmetrically arranged houses—was rejected by Rentekammeret for its lack of compliance with Nicolai Eigtved's guidelines for facade design in the new Frederiksstaden district. The area along Amaliegade was instead divided into 12 lots numbered 69A–K. The two first houses were already completed in 1782 and the next two followed in 1783. The construction was discontinued after that due to a lack of funding. The four houses were symmetrically arranged with a central gateway in the second and third houses and a front door in the first and fourth houses. Harsdorff's plans for the remainder of the site may have been to repeat this arrangement twice more.

The value of the house on Parcel No. 69 D was assessed at 6,000 rigsdaler. It was shortly thereafter sold to master mason Frederik Beckmann. In spring 1888, Beckmann purchased a piece of land at the rear, facing the street Skippergade, which was never completed, on the rear of his property. He then expanded the perpendicular side wing in height and constructed a five-storey rear wing. On 4 May 1795, he insured it for 9,500 rigsdaler.

=== Later history ===
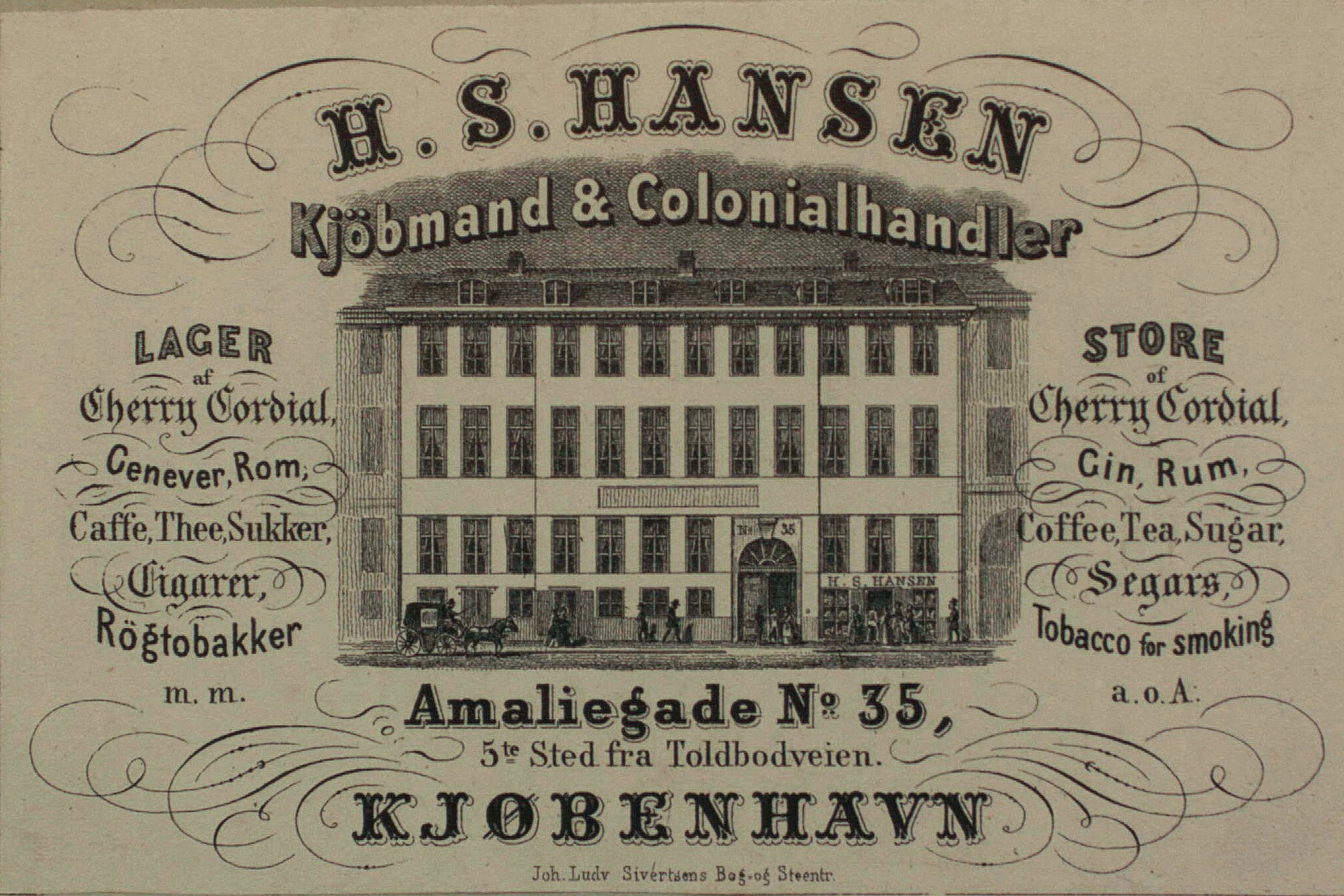
Advert for H. S. Hansen's grocery and colonial goods business in the building.

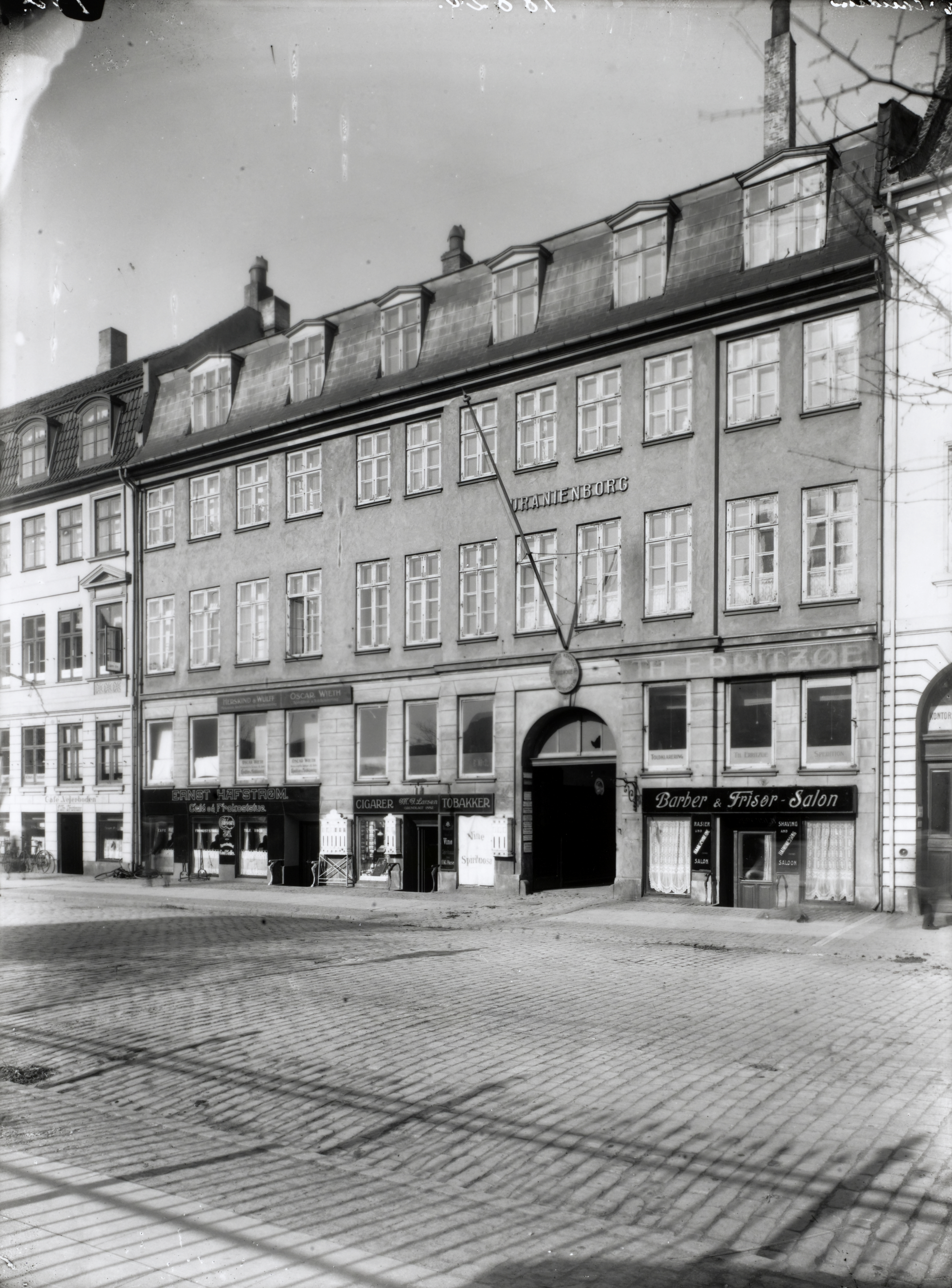
Oeder's Botanical Garden in Amaliegade

The writer Thomasine Gyllembourg was among the residents in 1816.

In the new cadastre of 1806, the property was listed as No. 138. It was still owned by Beckmann.

At the time of the 1834 census, No. 138 was home to four households. Peter Clementin, an architect, resided in the ground-floor apartment to the left with his wife Hedevig Margrethe née Winther, their 19-year-old daughter Elisi Kristiane Juel, a lodger, a male servant and a maid. Mathias Frederik Købke, a clerk in stadsmægler Wieksher's firm, resided in the ground-floor apartment to the right with his wife Julie Mathilde née Andrade, 39-year-old Emma Caroline Simonzen and one maid. Christian Ludvig Autzen, a lackey in Princess Caroline Amalie's court, resided in the other first-floor apartment (to the right) with his wife Johane Qvisting Willemsen, wet nurse Sidse Masdatter and one maid. Jens Jørgen Hoppe, a secretary and the owner of the building, resided in the first-floor apartment to the left with his wife Anne Christine Hoppe (née Buck), their eight children (aged two to eight) and two maids. Ole Pedersen, a servant, resided in one room on the ground floor with his wife Anne Dorthea Pedersen and their two children (aged ten and twelve). Christoph Lauritz Prøselius, a first lieutenant in the Royal Danish Navy, resided in the second-floor apartment to the left with his wife Augusta Prøselius née Frydendahl, their two children (aged five and seven), four lodgers (three of them naval cadets), one male servant and one maid. Peter Frydendahl, an instrument maker, resided in the second-floor apartment to the right with a servant, the servant's wife and their two children (aged two and three). Jens Micael Houmann, a baker, resided on the third floor to the Marie Hansen and four unmarried children (aged 25 to 31). Søren Nicolaj Agri, a customs officer, resided in the third-floor apartment to the right with his wife Charlotte Amalie Dorthea Agri (née Printzling), their son Hans Nicolaj Agri (a decoration and portrait painter) and an apprentice. Urbanus Mathias Lund, a grocer (spækhøker), resided in the basement with his wife Bolette Lund née Hansen, their 12-year-old daughter, a maid and two lodgers. Carl Peter Olsen, the building's concierge, resided in the intermediate wing with his wife Johanne Olsen (née Andersen) and their 16-year-old daughter, a merchant, a joiner and a laundry woman.

== Architecture ==
The building consists of three storeys over a raised cellar and is 12 bays long. The asymmetrically placed median risalit with the gate reflects that the building was constructed as two individual houses. It is located in the four central bays of Beckmann's eight-bay extension from 1788 while the four southernmost bays fate from Harsdorff's house from 1791. The mansard roof features six dormer windows. Two perpendicular side wings extend from the rear side of the building along the southern and northern margin of the lot.
