= Shimanovsky House =

Building in Taganrog, Russia

Coordinates: 47°12′44″N 38°55′48″E

- Дом Шимановского
- Location: 31 Frunze Street/16 Italyansky Lane, Taganrog
- Material: brick
- Opening date: 1850
- Restored date: 1914

The Shimanovsky House (Russian: Дом Шимановского) is a neoclassical building in Taganrog, Rostov Oblast, Russia. It is located at the corner of two streets, and has the address 31 Frunze Street/16 Italyansky Lane. The mansion was owned by the Sychev family during the second half of the 19th century.

== History ==
This small, one-story house was originally built in 1850. Three of its windows looked out onto Frunze Street, two more onto Italyansky Lane. From 1870 to 1900 the house belonged to the Sychev merchant family. In the 1870s, Miron Yakovlevich Sychev, was the owner. Miron Yakovlevich married an eighteen-year-old girl, Raisa Konstantinovna Drosso, in the local Greek Catholic Church. From the end of the 19th century to the 1910s it belonged to Akim Yakovlevich Sychev. He was elected to the local Duma in 1890, and was a member of the chamber of commerce and a Freeman of the city. The Sychev Brothers were engaged in the trade of manufactured goods around the Old Market and the station. They advertised in the press the sale of silk fabrics, calico, woollen clothing and blankets.

The mansion in Frunze Street was surrounded by a big garden and had domestic and retail out-buildings. On one side of the corner house there had been a colonial goods store selling coffee and other commodities.

In 1910, the garden, the house, and domestic extensions were refurbished by a highly rated gynaecologist, Vladimir Grigoryevich Shimanovsky. It was through his name that the house found popularity. His spouse was called Marta Pavlovna. Doctor Shimanovsky was deeply involved in community work that included work with the city's societies and institutions. He also owned a car – a rarity at that time as in Taganrog there were only a few vehicles. The couple had no children of their own, but they took care of two nephews.

In 1914, the site was greatly modernised and extended respecting its original style. Features in the Russian "Art Nouveau style" were added to the brick facade. Red brick was used for the outside walls. Inside, parquet was used for the flooring. The walls were wallpapered, and the ceilings dressed with cornicing. Iron and zinc were used for the roof extension. The site was equipped with its own boiler room located near the kitchen. There was a pump for the water supply to the house. The house was now composed of 19–20 rooms – 10 of which were occupied, the remainder were used for other designated purposes. Their total area was 227 square meters.
