= Do & Co =

Austrian catering company

DO & CO Restaurants & Catering AG

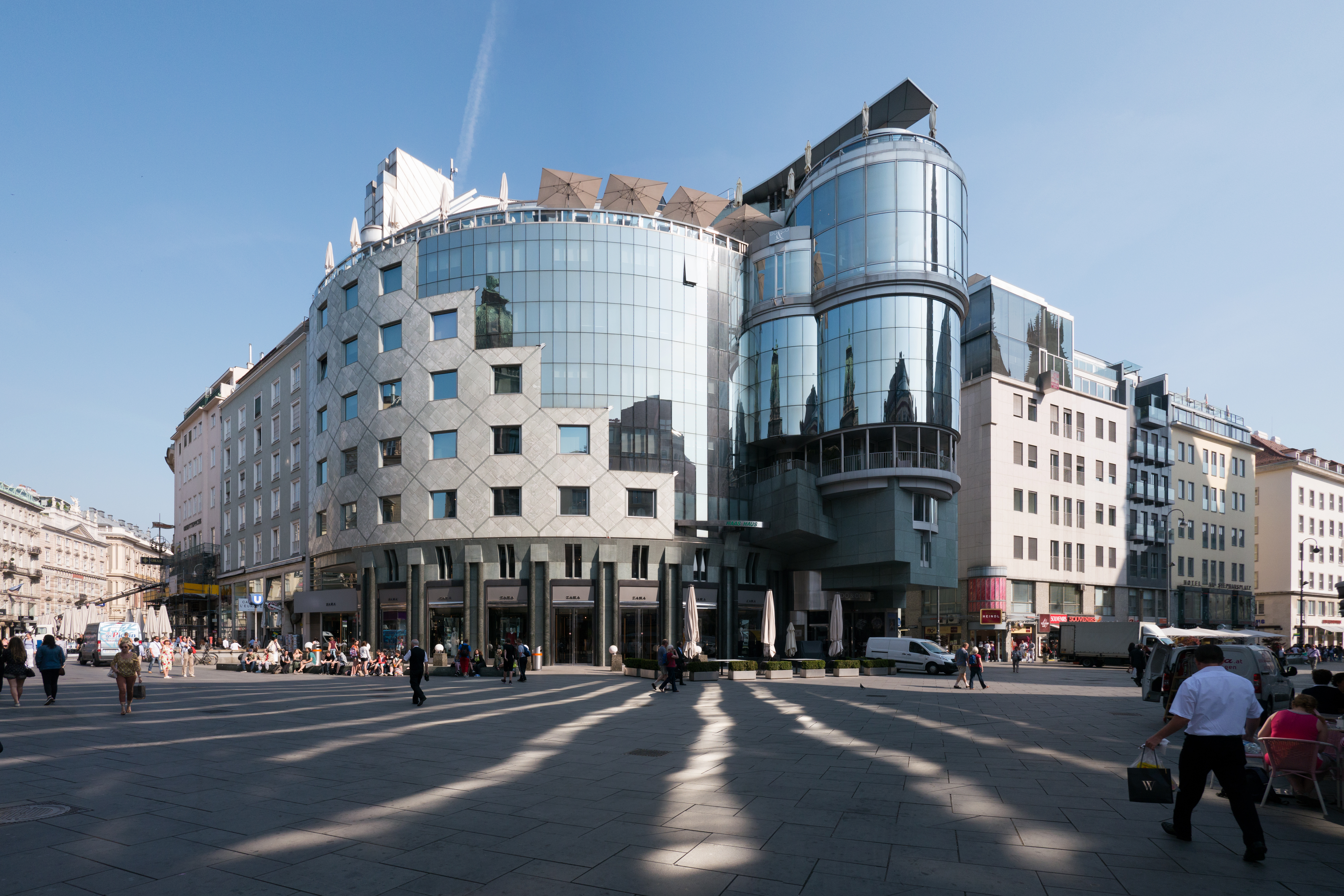
- Haas House, the company's headquarters
- Traded as: WBAG: DOC
- ISIN: AT0000818802
- Industry: Catering
- Founded: 1981
- Founder: Attila Doğudan
- Headquarters: Vienna, Austria
- Key people: Attila Doğudan, Dr.Klauss Petermann (CFO), Gottfried Neumeister (COO), Haig Asenbauer (CIO)
- Owner: Attila Doğudan Private Foundation holds a stake of 41% / 59 % free float
- Number of employees: 8,683 (end of 2014)
- Divisions: Airline Catering, Event Catering, Hotels & Restaurants
- Website: www.doco.com

DO & CO Aktiengesellschaft is an Austrian catering company, headquartered in Vienna. It is active in segments such as airline catering, train catering, and international events catering. The company also provides services through its restaurants, bars, lounges, and hotels. In 1998 DO & CO was listed on the Vienna Stock Exchange. In February 2018 DO & CO co-founded the Airline Catering Association, which is based in Brussels, Belgium.

== Activities ==
The company has handled the catering of Austrian Airlines since 2007, British Airways since 2018 and ÖBB since 2012, the latter under its Henry am Zug brand. Do & Co provides VIP catering for Formula One races and provides hospitality and catering services for UEFA European Football Championship events.

In 2014, Do & Co acquired French grocer Hédiard out of bankruptcy.

In early February 2015, DO & CO announced the establishment of a joint company with Nespresso for the operation of Nespresso Cafés.

Period	2012	2013	2014	2015 3Quarters
Sales (€m)	466.35	576.19	636.14	597.79

== Turkish DO & CO ==
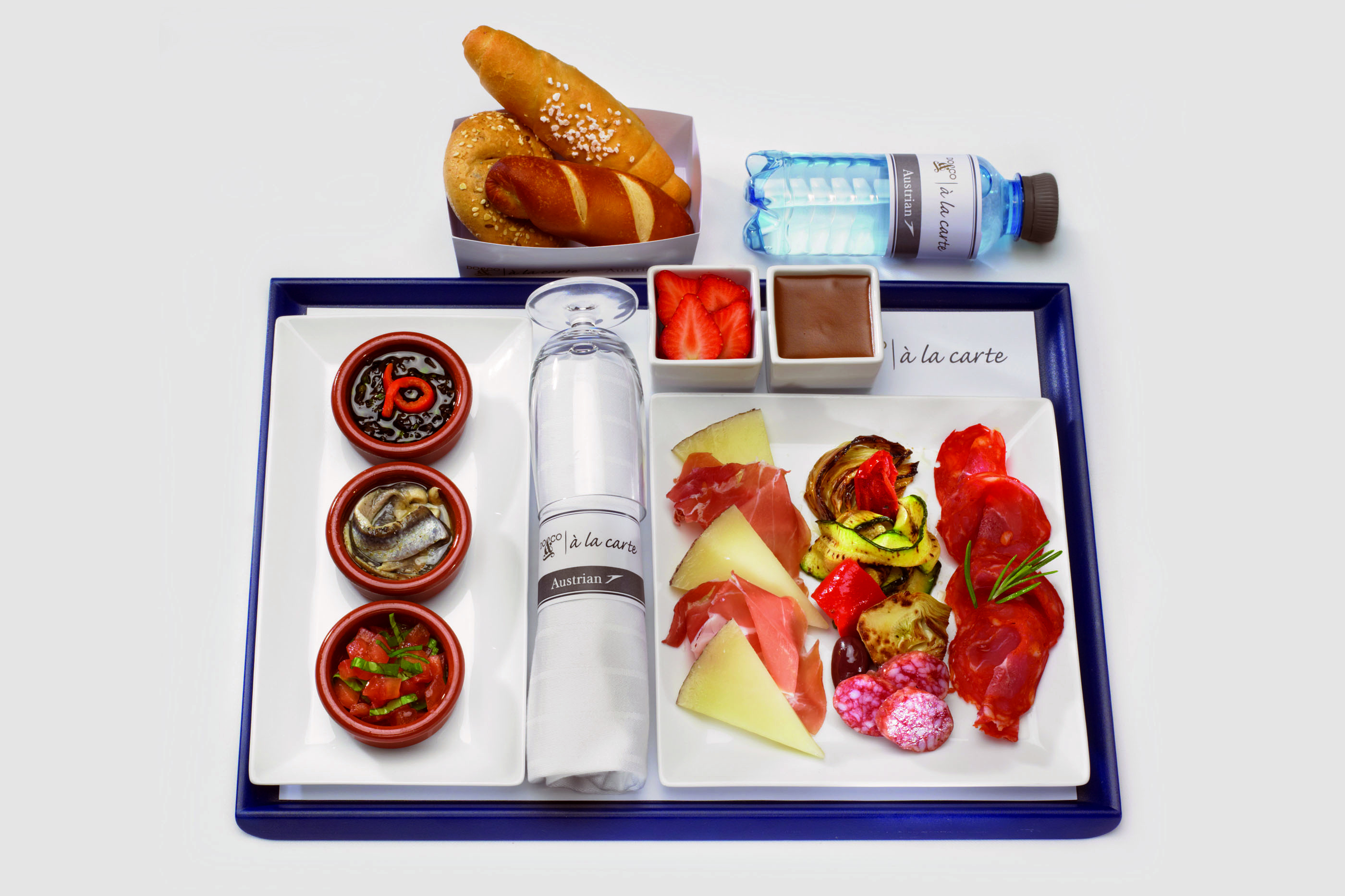
A Do & Co meal as served aboard Austrian Airlines flights

Established in 2007, Turkish DO & CO is jointly owned by DO & CO and Turkish Airlines. It has been operating nine gourmet kitchens in Turkey. Over 60 national and international airlines, among whom Turkish Airlines represents 85% of the sales, are catered from these locations. The company also operates Turkish Airlines' business class lounges.
