= Korwin-Szymanowski family =

Polish nobility

The Korwin-Szymanowski family (Polish plural: Korwin-Szymanowscy, feminine singular: Korwin-Szymanowska) are Polish nobles who probably took their surname from the village of Szymany near Szczuczyn, in the Masovia region of Poland in the Late Middle Ages. From the 16th-century onwards they were landowners and office holders in Masovia. In the 18th century during the Partitions of Poland, the family adopted the prefix "Korwin" to distinguish their lineage from other families bearing the same name. At the tail end of the 1790s a branch of the family settled on the Dnieper river in what is now Ukraine and produced a number of noted writers and musicians among whom was the composer, Karol Szymanowski.

Family crest 'Jezierza'

Family crest 'Ślepowron'

== Occurrence of the surname ==
The Szymanowski surname occurs in Northern Europe, from Russia, through the Baltic States and Poland to Germany, France and the United Kingdom. It is also found in the United States, Canada and South America. Alternative spellings are Schimanovsky, Szymanowsky.

== Origins ==
The family name is of ancient heritage in Masovia. It is presently traceable to the fifteenth century, but may have roots further back in the Kingdom of Hungary. Legend has it that genealogy connects it to a Roman tribune, Valerius Messala Corvinus, in the province of Dacia in the Late Roman Empire. According to composer Karol Szymanowski's exacting biographer, Teresa Chylińska, the village of Szymany in Masovia of present day Podlaskie Voivodeship was land recorded as having been inherited by Mikołaj (Nicholas) Szymanowski and he died before 1544. The family later moved to the Rawa Voivodeship from where they spread into Masovia.

The earliest written record of the family dates from the 15th century. In 1457 the knight, John (Jan (Korwin) Szymanowski), returned to the small village of "Szymany", from the Thirteen Years' War, also called the War of the Cities, fought between 1454–66 by the Prussian Confederation, allied with the Kingdom of Poland, against the State of the Teutonic Order. He is considered the founder of the family. John came from a clan bearing the coat of arms, "Jezierza", which has its beginnings among pre-Christian tribal warriors.

In the ensuing centuries, scions of the family appear not only as landowners in the Mazovian province, but as holders of numerous civic roles and as magistrates (in Polish, Starosta), representatives to the Polish Sejm (diet or parliament). They were noted and honoured for their peace time contributions to the development of Polish society and culture. Their long held and cherished reputation as dedicated to Church and Kingdom made them consistently sought after consorts to many grander families in the land, whose star may have waxed and then wained during the tribulations of Polish history. By the end of the 18th century, Szymanowskis were familiar at Court and signatories of the new Polish Constitution of 1791.

The family, like many others of comparable standing, had long maintained strong cultural ties with the Catholic Kingdom of France. French was taught and spoken in the home alongside Polish. When Poland was torn apart as an entity in three successive partitions Partitions of Poland in the last quarter of the 18th century by its powerful neighbours, Russia, Prussia and the Austrian Empire, the hope offered by Napoleon became inexorable. Several Szymanowskis enlisted as officers in army regiments, as a patriotic duty and fought in Napoleonic campaigns. For some it cost them their wealth, their lives or drove them into exile. This pattern continued into the 19th and 20th centuries, when Polish uprisings meant the ultimate sacrifice for family members. Around this time, the double barrelled form of the family name came into usage, to distinguish clan members from other (unrelated) Szymanowskis, although several noted writers, artists and musicians of the family continued to be known simply as "Szymanowski".

The several branches of the Korwin-Szymanowski family continue to this day, spread now over a number of continents.

=== Korwin prefix ===
The "Korwin" prefix is a 19th c. adoption, based on ancestral connections shared by several other Polish families referring to the medieval Korwin clan, which includes the Korwin-Krasiński or Korwin-Kossakowski families. The use of the hyphen in Polish is a 20th c. development; prior to that, double-barrelled Polish names were not hyphenated.

== Coat of arms ==
Another distinguishing feature of the Korwin-Szymanowski family are its heraldic insignia. It is associated with two coats of arms, but significantly seldom with the one called "Korwin". It is commonly connected with Ślepowron and occasionally with Jezierza. Both use raven like birds with their beaks facing the East, presumably towards Jerusalem. One explanation, as yet to be established, is that family members participated in the Crusades. The reason for two distinct coats of arms may be due to the geographic spread of the family and their enlisting in different army groupings.

== Some notable members ==
Notable members include:

- Marcin Szymanowski (died after 1578) - a signatory of the Treaty of Lublin 1569
- Melchior Szymanowski - founding donor of Powązki Cemetery in Warsaw
- Michał Szymanowski - Starost of Wyszogród in Mazovia
- Józef Szymanowski - lawyer, enlightenment writer, translator, Poniatowski courtier and dandy
- Józef Szymanowski - officer in Napoleon's army, General
- Feliks Szymanowski - officer in Napoleon's army and Polish National Bank director
- Oswald Korwin Szymanowski - genealogist
- Julius von Szymanowski - ENT surgeon from Riga working and teaching in Kiev
- Vladimir Gregorievich Szymanowski - gynaecologist from Taganrog developer of an Art Moderne mansion
- Theodore de Korwin Szymanowski - writer, early proponent of a united Europe and anti-slavery campaigner
- Feliks Maria Mateusz Korwin Szymanowski - engineer, architect and priest, supporter of women priests
- Stephen Korwin-Szymanowski - theologian, settled in California
- Karol Szymanowski - composer
- Stanislawa Korwin Szymanowska - opera singer, sister of the composer
- Zofia Korwin Szymanowska - writer, sister of the composer
- Franciszek Korwin-Szymanowski - Slavonic scholar, translator of Bulgarian literature

== See also ==
- Ślepowron coat of arms
- Napoleon's Russian Campaign
- Szlachta
- Polish Uprisings
