= Celina Szymanowska =

Wife of Polish poet Adam Mickiewicz (1812–1855)

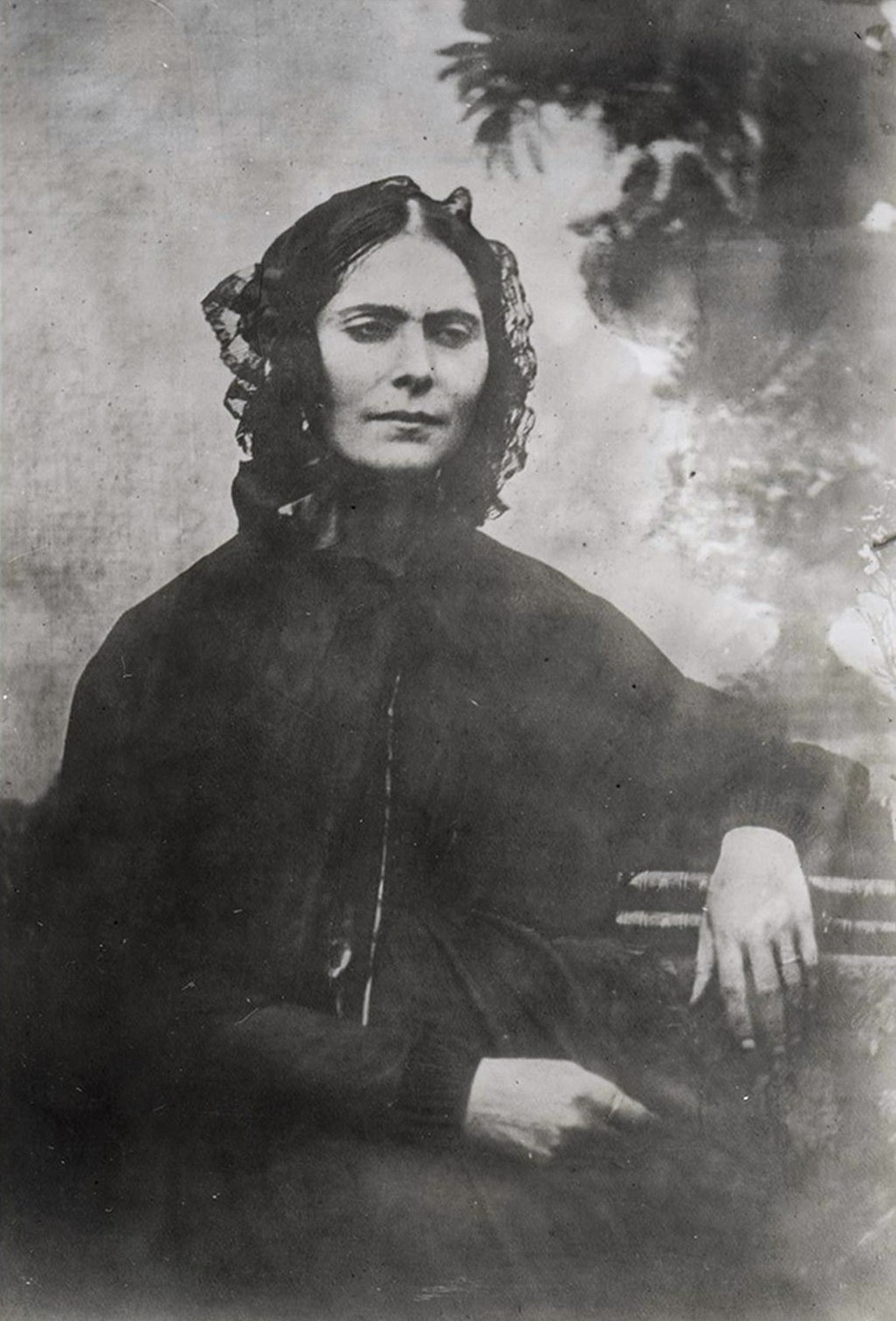
- Born: Celina Szymanowska; 16 July 1812; Congress Kingdom of Poland (now Poland)
- Died: 5 March 1855 (aged 42)
- Burial place: Père Lachaise Cemetery, reinterred to Les Champeaux Cemetery at Montmorency
- Other names: Celina Mickiewiczowa, Celina Mickiewicz
- Spouse: Adam Mickiewicz (m. 1834–1855; her death)
- Children: 6
- Mother: Maria Szymanowska

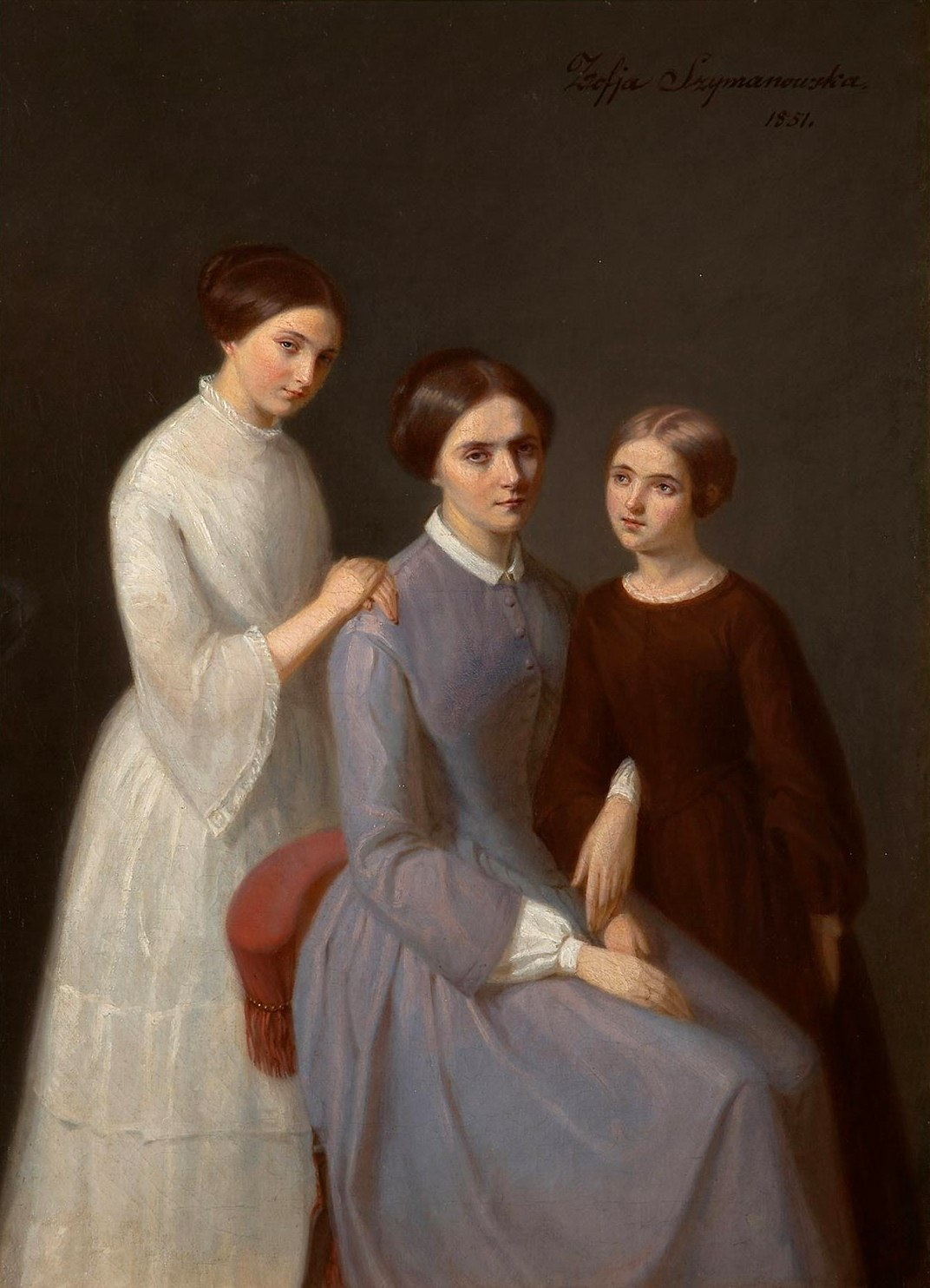
Celina Mickiewiczowa With Her Daughters Maria and Helena (1851), oil on canvas, by Zofia Szymanowska-Lenartowicz

Celina Szymanowska (16 July 1812 – 5 March 1855) was a daughter of the Polish composer and pianist Maria Agata Szymanowska and the wife of the Polish Romantic poet Adam Mickiewicz. She also went by the name Celina Mickiewicz.

== Biography ==
Celina's mother was Maria Szymanowska, a composer and pianist, and her father was Józef Szymanowski. She was the half-sister of painter Zofia Szymanowska-Lenartowicz, who lived with Celina and painted many portraits of the Mickiewicz family in her later life.

Szymanowska married poet Adam Mickiewicz in Paris on 22 July 1834; he was fourteen years older than her. The couple had six children: daughters Maria and Helena, and sons Władysław (1838–1926), Józef (1850–1938), Aleksander, and Jan.

Celina was disliked by many notable Polish émigrés, including the Romantic poet Zygmunt Krasiński. She was accused of extravagance, poor cooking skills, a desire to dominate her husband, and mental instability. In 1838 Celina declared herself a prophet, an incarnation of the Mother of God, and redeemer of Poland, Polish émigrés and Jews. She also claimed to possess a power to heal, which she said she had successfully applied to the gravely ill Adolf Zaleski.

For some time, Adam Mickiewicz cared for his wife himself. However, marital discord and Celina's mental illness drove him to attempt suicide on 17 or 18 December 1838 by jumping out a window. When he found Celina's mental state worsening, Mickiewicz had her admitted to a mental hospital in Vanves, Paris, where she underwent sleep deprivation, cold-water and mental-shock therapies. Celina was discharged from the hospital by Andrzej Towiański, who claimed to have "miraculously cured her". He assured her that she had regained her mental health, and she remained under his influence and that of the Circle of God's Cause (Koło Sprawy Bożej) until her death.

== Death ==
Upon her death in 1855, she was interred at Paris' Père-Lachaise Cemetery. Exhumed, her remains were transferred to the Les Champeaux Cemetery in Montmorency. The Mickiewicz family tomb has laid there ever since.
