= List of compositions by Maria Szymanowska =

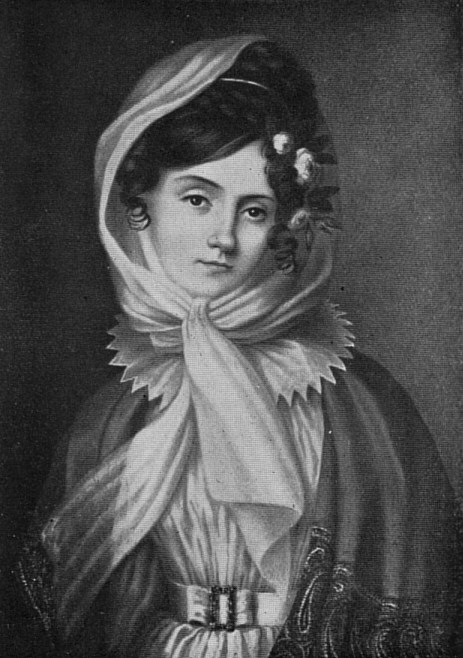
Maria Szymanowska around 1830

This list of compositions by Maria Szymanowska is divided into three sections: Published Works; Unpublished Works; and Uncertain Authorships, Fragments, and Arrangements. Published and Unpublished Works are further divided into works for solo keyboard, voice and piano accompaniment, and chamber works. Dates or approximate dates of published works are provided.

== Published works ==
=== Works for solo keyboard ===
- Caprice sur la Romance de Joconde (et l’on revient toujours) pour le pianoforte (1819)
- Cotillon ou Valse Figurée pour le piano [1824]
- Danse polonaise: pour le piano dédié à Monsieur Baillot (c.1825)
- Dix-huit Danses de différent genre pour le piano-forte (1819)
- Douze exercices: pour le piano (c.1825)
- Fantaisie pour le Pianoforte (c.1820)
- Grande Valse pour le pianoforte à quatre mains (c.1820)
- Le Murmure Nocturne pour le piano composé et arrangé à trios mains in A flat (c.1819)
- Nocturne in B flat
- Polonaise pour le pianoforte sur l’air national favori du feu Prince Joseph Poniatowsky (1820)
- Polonese (1825)
- Romance de Monsieur le Prince Alexander Galitzin arrangée pour le Pianoforte (c.1820)
- Six Marches pour le pianoforte (c.1819)
- Six Menuets Pour le pianoforte (1819)
- Six valses a trois mains pour le Piano Forte [1832]
- Twenty-four Mazurkas, or National Polish Dances (1826)
- Valses à trois mains pour le piano forte (c.1820)
- Vingt Exercices et Préludes pour le pianoforte (1819)

=== Works for voice and piano accompaniment ===
- Complainte d’un aveugle qui demandait l’aumône au Jardin des plantes à Paris (c.182?)
- Jadwiga, królowa polska (1816)
- Jan Albrycht (1816)
- Duma o kniaziu Michale Glińskim (1816)
- Le chant de la Vilia (1829)
- Le Départ. Romance (paroles de Cervantes, traduites par Florian) mise en Musique (1819)
- Pieśń z Wieży (1828)
- Romance à Josephine [n.d.]
- Se spiegar potessi oh Dio [n.d.]
- Six Romances avec accompaniment de piano-forte (c.1820)
- Śpiewka na dwa głosy. “Ah! jakiż to piękny kwiatek” (1829)
- Śpiewka na powrót Woysk Polskich. “Nie będę łez ronić” Mazurka (1822)
- Świtezianka (c.1829)
- Trzy śpiewy z poematu Adama Mickiewicza Wallenrod (1828)
- Wilija naszych strumieni rodzica (c.1830)

=== Chamber works ===
- Divertissement pour le pianoforte avec accompagnement de violon (1820)
- Sérénade pour le Pianoforte avec accompagnement de Violoncelle (1820)
- Thème varié (1821)

== Unpublished works ==
=== Works for solo keyboard ===
- Bacchelia
- Contredance Le Philis
- Marche pas redouble pour le piano-forte
- Preludium B-dur
- Romance de la Reine Hortense
- Temat Wariacji b-moll

=== Works for voice and piano accompaniment ===
- Kaźimierz Wielki
- Stefan Czarniecki

=== Chamber works ===
- Fanfara dwugłosowa na dwa rogi lub dwie trąbki [for two horns]

== Uncertain authorships, fragments, arrangements ==
- Jazmena (vocal part only)
- Pieśń na głos z fortepianem (possibly by Kazimiera Wołowska)
- Three arrangements of Polish folksongs: Coś tak oczki zapłakała (Mazurek), O ia mazur rodowity (Mazurek), Błysło słonko na Zachodzie
