= Jean-Louis Masurel =

- Born: c. 1940
- Died: 2023; Toulon
- Education: University of Lille; HEC Paris; Harvard Business School
- Occupation: Businessman

Jean-Louis Masurel (born c. 1940; died c. 2023) was a French businessman in the banking, hospitality, and luxury food and wine industries. He was the chief executive officer (CEO) of Moët-Hennessy and LVMH, and the CEO of Société des bains de mer de Monaco.

== Early life ==
Jean-Louis Masurel was born on September 18, 1940, in Cannes, Alpes-Maritimes (France). He graduated from the University of Lille in 1957, HEC Paris in 1962, and the Harvard Business School in 1964.

== Career ==
Masurel worked for Morgan Guaranty Trust, now part of J.P. Morgan & Co., from 1964 to 1979. He then worked for BNP Paribas from 1980 to 1983. In 1988, he was named managing director of LVMH but resigned in 1989 before the merger of the two entities.

Masurel was an independent director of the Société des bains de mer de Monaco since 1994, and was named CEO of the gambling group in 2011. Additionally, he serves as Vice Chairman of the Supervisory Board of Oudart. He also serves on the board of directors of the Compagnie de Transports Financière et Immobilière, Banque J. Safra - Monaco, and Banque du Gothard.

Masurel is the owner of Arcos Investissement, a holding company. He was the owner of Hédiard, a luxury food brand, from 1991 to 1995. He acquired Château Trians, a vineyard in Néoules in Southern France, in 1989. He also serves as a Managing Partner of the Société des Vins de Fontfroide.

== Awards and honours ==
- Knight of the Legion of Honour;
- Knight of Arts and Letters;
- Knight of the Order of Saint-Charles.
