= Dry goods =

Term referring to supplies and manufactured goods

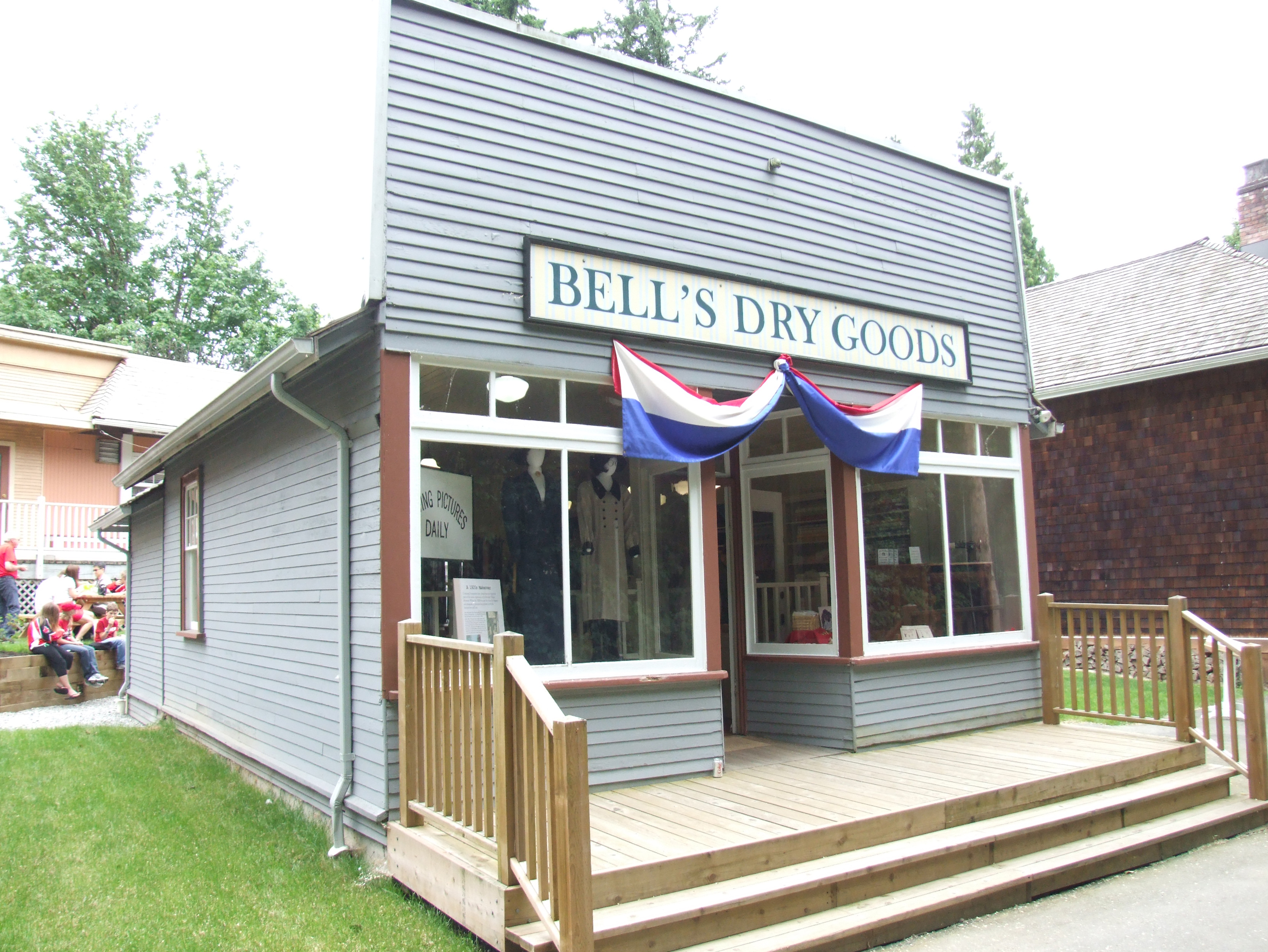
Exterior of a dry goods store with a Western-style false front in Burnaby Village Museum, British Columbia, Canada

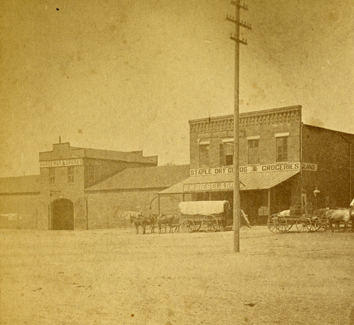
Dry goods store in Macon, Georgia, U.S., c. 1877

Dry goods is a historic term describing the type of product line a store carries, which differs by region. The term comes from the textile trade, and the shops appear to have spread with the mercantile trade across the British Empire (and former British territories) as a means of bringing supplies and manufactured goods to far-flung settlements and homesteads. Starting in the mid-18th century, these stores began by selling supplies and textile goods to remote communities, and many customized the products they carried to the area's needs. This continued to be the trend well into the early 20th century. With the rise of department stores and catalog sales, the decline of dry goods stores began, and the term has largely fallen out of use. Some dry goods stores became department stores, especially around the turn of the 20th century.

The term goes back to the 17th century and originally referred to any goods measured in dry measure, not liquid measure, of volume, such as stere, bushel or peck. Dry goods as a term for textiles dates back to 1742 in England or even a century earlier.

== Commonwealth and Philippines usage ==
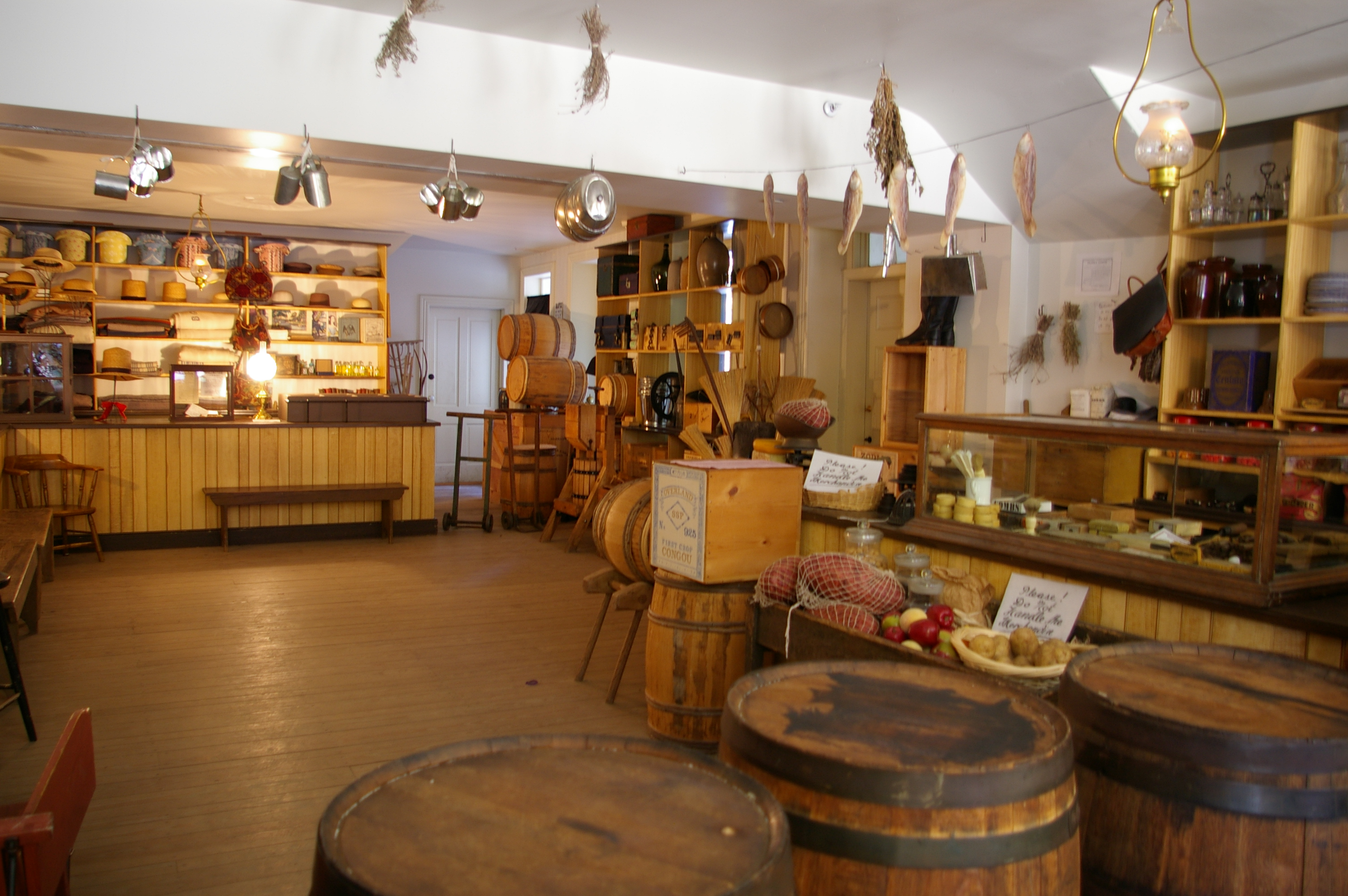
Dry Goods store, Harper's Ferry

In Commonwealth countries and the Philippines, dry goods are dry (dried, preserved) food items which have a years-long or indefinite shelf-life. They are "dry" because they are not stored in a preserving anti-fungal or anti-bacterial liquid which fully wets the preserved goods. The "dry goods" usage is made with reference to pre-refrigeration days of the early 20th century. Such foods could be transported and stored without immediate danger of spoiling, and without the extra weight and fragility of waterproof glass or ceramic containers. Dried beans, flours, whole grains, and rolled oats are examples of this type of dry goods.

== U.S. usage ==
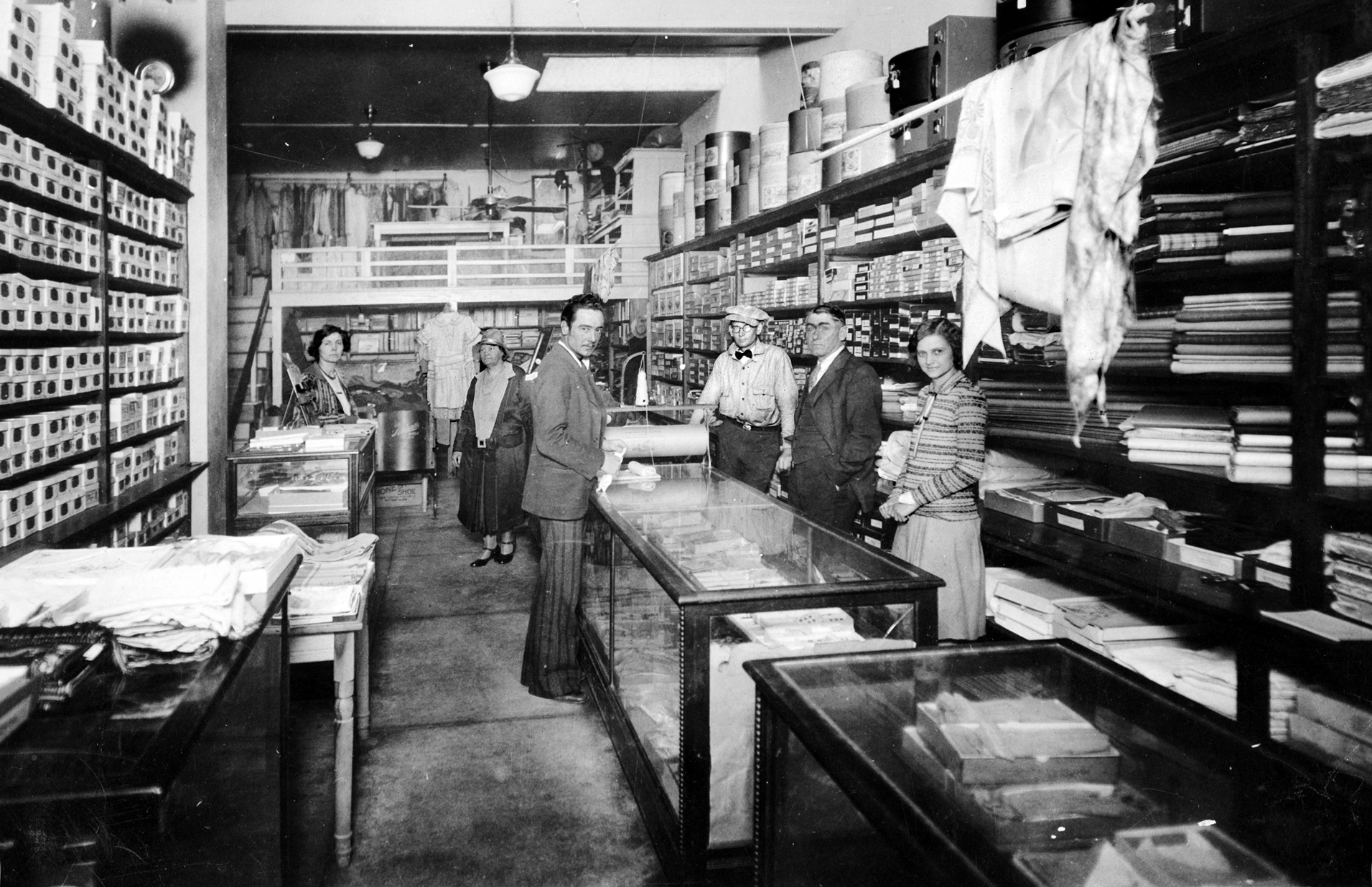
Cochran's Dry Goods in Livingston, Texas, circa 1946

In the United States, dry goods are products such as textiles, ready-to-wear clothing, blankets, and "grocery items (such as tobacco, sugar, flour, and coffee) that do not contain liquid." In US retailing, a dry-goods store carries consumer goods that are distinct from those carried by hardware stores and grocery stores. Downtown Ann Arbor, Michigan had as many as 15 stores that sold dry goods.

Dry goods can be carried by stores specializing only in those products (a type of specialty store), or may be carried by a general store or a department store.

Beginning in the early 20th century, many dry goods stores expanded into other lines of merchandise, and the term largely disappeared from both everyday usage and the official names of the businesses concerned. As an example, The Denver Dry Goods Company became known to a generation simply as The Denver, a mall anchor store in the western United States.

== See also ==
- Colonial goods store
