= Przebój Wolbrom =

Polish football club

- Full name: Wolbromski Klub Sportowy; Przebój Wolbrom
- Founded: 1937; 88 years ago
- Ground: Stadion Leśny
- Capacity: 1,500
- Chairman: Ireneusz Dobrek
- Manager: Radosław Koterba
- League: Regional league Kraków I
- 2024–25: V liga Lesser Poland West, 15th of 17 (relegated)
- Website: http://www.przeboj-wolbrom.pl/

Przebój Wolbrom is a Polish football club based in Wolbrom. As of the 2025–26 season, they compete in the first Kraków group of the regional league.

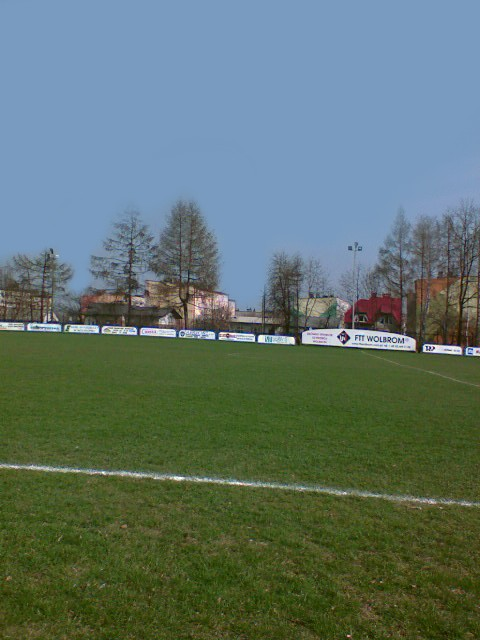
Ground: Stadion Leśny

== Honours ==
- 10th place in the 2008–09 II liga season.
- Promotion to III liga in the 2006–07 season.
- Polish Cup Lesser Poland regionals winner in the 2007–08 season (as Przebój Wolbrom II).

== Notable people ==
- Antoni Szymanowski – former coach of Przebój Wolbrom (2005–2008) – the former Poland national football team player
