= Attila Doğudan =

Turkish-Austrian businessperson (born 1959)

- Born: 1959 (age 66–67); Istanbul, Turkey
- Occupations: CEO and 40% owner, Do & Co
- Children: 2

Attila Doğudan (born 1959) is a Turkish and Austrian businessman, CEO of the Vienna-based Do & Co catering company.

== Early life ==
Attila Doğudan was born to a Turkish father and Austrian mother in Istanbul, Turkey. He moved to Vienna with his family at the age of ten. In 1981, he began his professional career with a charcuterie shop in Vienna, while he was studying economics. He dropped out of university.

== Business performance ==
Doğudan earned Euro 1.2 million in 2014 and his 40% personal shares in Do & Co are worth Euro 300 million.

He is the CEO and Chairman of the Management Board of Do & Co.

== Awards ==
The International Flight Catering Association awarded Do & Co the Golden Mercury Award three times. In 2003, Magazine Trend named Doğudan "Man of the Year".

In 2011, he was named "Austrian of the Year" in the Business category.

Doğudan has been awarded the "Manager of the Year 2015" award by the European Business Press (EBP).

The Turkish Airlines, catered by Do & Co received the Best Business Class Food and Beverage Award among European Airlines in 2015.

== Personal life ==
Doğudan and his family moved to Barcelona when his children were young. He is married and has two sons: Attila Mark and Marius, who are both involved in his business. He was close friends with Niki Lauda.

In his youth, Doğudan was part of the Austrian national table tennis team.

== See also ==
- Turks in Austria
