= Maria Szymanowska =

Polish composer and pianist (1789–1831)

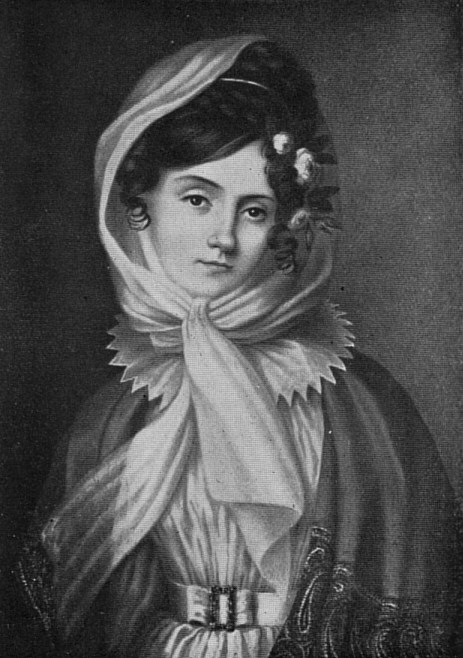
- Maria Szymanowska around 1830

Background information
- Born: Marianna Agata Wołowska; 14 December 1789; Warsaw, Masovian Voivodeship, Polish–Lithuanian Commonwealth
- Died: 25 July 1831 (aged 41) Saint Petersburg, Saint Petersburg Governorate, Russian Empire
- Genre: Classical music
- Occupations: Pianist, composer
- Instrument: Piano

Maria Szymanowska (Polish pronunciation: [ˈmarja ʂɨmaˈnɔfska]; born Marianna Agata Wołowska; Warsaw, 14 December 1789 – 25 July 1831, Saint Petersburg, Russia) was a Polish composer and one of the first professional virtuoso pianists of the 19th century. She toured extensively throughout Europe, especially in the 1820s, before settling permanently in Saint Petersburg. In the Russian imperial capital, she composed for the court, gave concerts, taught music, and ran an influential salon. The salons in 18th-century France were intellectual gatherings held at home by educated women. In 1837, the composer and music critic Robert Schumann defined salon music as elegant light music and stated that this type of social music should sound beautiful, delicate, and fashionable. Szymanowska was highly praised by Schumann for her salon music works, especially her etudes.

Her compositions—largely piano pieces, songs, and other small chamber works, as well as the first piano concert etudes and nocturnes in Poland—typify the stile brillant of the era preceding Frédéric Chopin. She was the mother of Celina Szymanowska, who married the Polish Romantic poet Adam Mickiewicz.

== Biography ==
Marianna Agata Wołowska was born in Warsaw, Poland, on 14 December 1789 into a prosperous Polish family with Frankist Jewish roots, one of her ancestors being Salomon Ben Elijah (or Jacob ben Judah Leib/Jacob Leibowicz), the personal assistant of Jacob Frank. Her father Franciszek Wołowski was a landlord and a brewer. Her mother Barbara Wołowska (née Lanckorońska) came from a noble Polish Lanckoroński family. The history of her early years and especially her musical studies is uncertain; she appears to have studied piano with Antoni Lisowski and Tomasz Gremm, and composition with Franciszek Lessel, Józef Elsner and Karol Kurpiński. Wołowska's salon was frequently visited by outstanding artists and intellectuals of the time. The guests at her salon included not only artists but also poets, pianists, and composers. The renowned Polish poet Adam Mickiewicz, the Russian poet Alexander Pushkin, the Russian composer and pianist Mikhail Glinka, and the Irish composer and pianist John Field all made appearances. Immersed in music from an early age, she attended concerts by famous musicians and, over time, played in front of them in her own house. She gave her first public recitals in Warsaw and Paris in 1810.

In the same year, she married Józef Szymanowski (d. 1832), with whom she had three children while living in Poland: Helena (1811–61), who married a Polish lawyer Franciszek Malewski, and twins Celina (1812–55), who married Adam Mickiewicz, and Romuald (1812–40), who became an engineer. The children remained with Maria after her separation from Szymanowski in 1820. The marriage ended in divorce.

Szymanowska died of cholera during the summer 1831 epidemic in Saint Petersburg.

She is presumed to be unrelated to 20th century Polish composer Karol Szymanowski.

== Performances ==
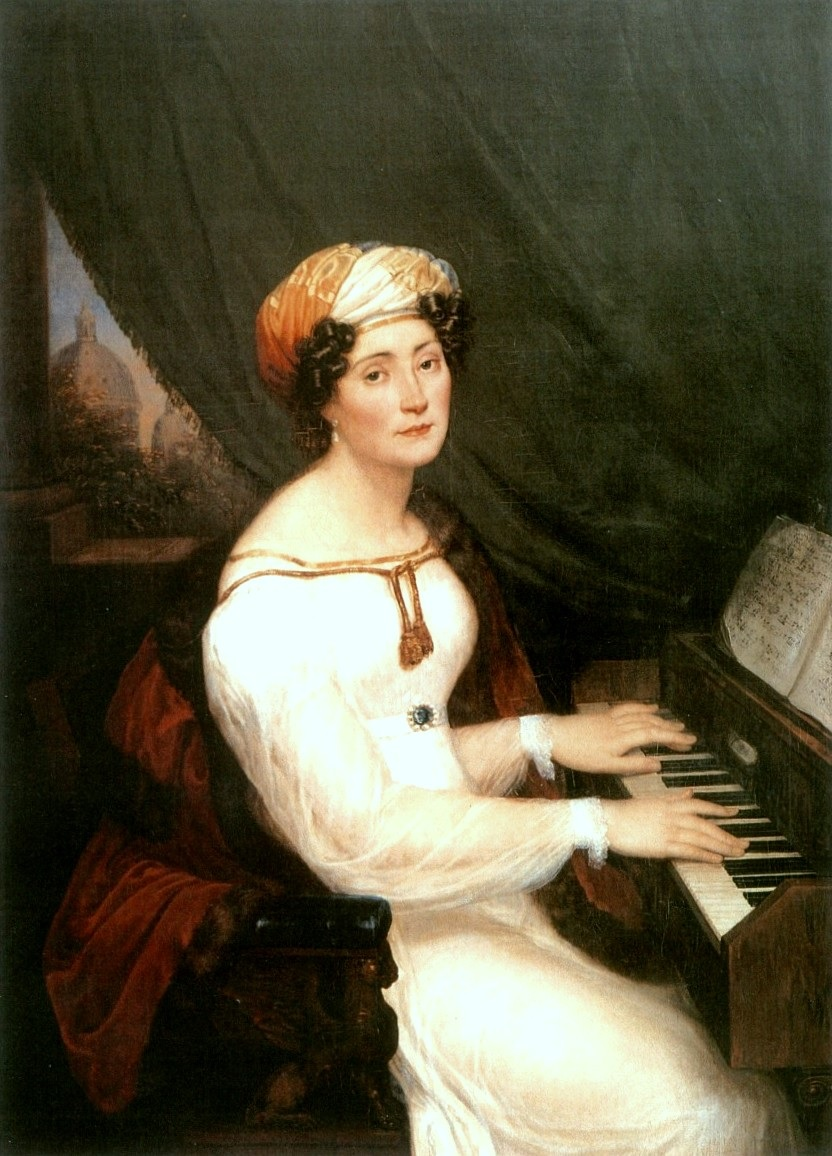
Szymanowska at the piano; portrait by Aleksander Kokular.

Her professional piano career began in 1815, with performances in England in 1818, a tour of Western Europe 1823–1826, including both public and private performances in Germany, France, England (on multiple occasions), Italy, Belgium and Holland. A number of these performances were given in private for royalty.

From 1822–1823, Szymanowska toured in many cities in the 19th century Russian territories, including Moscow, Kiev, Riga and, Saint Petersburg. There she performed at the Imperial Court and received the title of First Pianist. In Saint Petersburg, Szymanowska met Johann Nepomuk Hummel and performed with him.

In 1824, Maria performed for the Royal Philharmonic Society in London (May 18), at Hanover Square for the royal family (June 11), and at several private houses for dukes of Hamilton, Kent and Northumberland.

Her playing was very well received by critics and audiences alike, garnering her a reputation for a delicate tone, lyrical sense of virtuosity and operatic freedom. She was one of the first professional piano virtuosos in 19th-century Europe and one of the first pianists to perform memorized repertoire in public, a decade ahead of Franz Liszt and Clara Schumann. After years of touring, she returned to Warsaw for some time before relocating in early 1828, first to Moscow and then to Saint Petersburg, where she served as the court pianist to the Empress of Russia Alexandra Feodorovna.

== Compositions ==
Szymanowska composed around 100 piano pieces. Like many women composers of her time, she wrote music predominantly for instrumentation she had access to, including many solo piano pieces and miniatures, songs, and some chamber works. Her work is typically labeled, stylistically, as part of the pre-romantic period stile brillant and of Polish Sentimentalism. Szymanowska scholar Sławomir Dobrzański describes her playing and its historical significance as follows:

Her Etudes and Preludes show innovative keyboard writing; the Nocturne in B flat is her most mature piano composition; Szymanowska's Mazurkas represent one of the first attempts at stylization of the dance; Fantasy and Caprice contain an impressive vocabulary of pianistic technique; her polonaises follow the tradition of polonaise-writing created by Michał Kleofas Ogiński. Szymanowska's musical style is parallel to the compositional starting point of Frédéric Chopin; many of her compositions had an obvious impact on Chopin's mature musical language.

While scholars have debated the reach of her influence on her compatriot Chopin, her career as a pianist and composer strikingly foreshadows his own, as well as the broader trend in 19th-century Europe of the virtuoso pianist/composer, whose abilities as a performer expanded her technical possibilities as a composer.

== Reputation ==
Because of her stature as a performance artist and because of her salon, Szymanowska developed a strong web of connections with some of the most notable composers, performing musicians, and poets of her day, including Ludwig van Beethoven, Luigi Cherubini, Frederic Chopin, Gioacchino Rossini, Johann Hummel, John Field; Pierre Baillot, Giuditta Pasta; Johann Wolfgang von Goethe and Adam Mickiewicz. Beethoven, Hummel and Field dedicated compositions to her. Field once wrote to his French publishers to recommend Szymanowska's works. She studied piano and composition with John Field and was an outstanding student of his. Field, who was a strict teacher, once highly praised her talent. He played duets with her and recommended her works to publishers to increase her popularity. Goethe is rumored to have fallen deeply in love with her. She reputedly became the Muse that inspired Goethe's creativity. But not everyone was fascinated by her. She met Felix Mendelssohn, who was also a musician. The young and self-glorifying Mendelssohn was not impressed by her performance, thinking that her beauty outweighed her talent. The salon she established in Saint Petersburg drew especially prominent crowds, augmenting her status as a court musician.

== Modern editions ==
- Album per pianoforte. Maria Szmyd-Dormus, ed. Kraków: PWM, 1990. OCLC 28298115
- 25 Mazurkas. Irena Poniatowska, ed. Bryn Mawr, Pennsylvania: Hildegard, 1991. OCLC 29642696
- Music for Piano. Sylvia Glickman, ed. Bryn Mawr, Pennsylvania: Hildegard, 1991. OCLC 640197154
- Six Romances. Maja Trochimczyk, ed. Bryn Mawr, Pennsylvania: Hildegard, 1998. OCLC 40004757

== Discography ==
- Szymanowska: Complete Dances for Solo Piano. Alexander Kostrita, piano. Grand Piano GP685, 2015 OCLC 928139858
- Three Generations of Mazurkas: Polish dances for Piano by Szymanowska, Chopin, Szymanowski. Alexander Kostrita, piano. Divine Art DDA25123, 2014 OCLC 903369234
- Maria Szymanowska: Complete Piano Works. Sławomir Dobrzański, piano. Acte Préalable AP0281-83, 2013 AP0281-83. OCLC 855539971
- Maria Szymanowska: Ballades & Romances. Elżbieta Zapolska, mezzo-soprano; Bart van Oort, fortepiano Broadwood 1825. Acte Préalable AP0260, 2012 AP0260. OCLC 864185461
- Maria Szymanowska: Piano Works. Anna Ciborowska, piano. Dux, 2004. OCLC 906565484
- Szymanowska: Album. Carole Carniel, piano. Ligia Digital, 2005. OCLC 838932005
- Alla Polacca: Chopin et l'école polonaise de piano. Jean-Pierre Armengaud, piano. Mandala : Distribution Harmonia Mundi, 2000. OCLC 896035632
- Inspiration to Chopin. Karina Wisniewska, piano. Denon, 2000. OCLC 248888929
- Riches and Rags: A Wealth of Piano Music by Women. Nancy Fierro, piano. Ars Musica Poloniae, 1993. OCLC 29732610

== See also ==
- Celina Szymanowska (Maria Szymanowska's daughter; Adam Mickiewicz's wife)
- List of Poles
