= Henryk Szymanowski =

Polish footballer (born 1952)

Personal information
- Full name: Henryk Szymanowski
- Date of birth: 11 April 1952 (age 74)
- Place of birth: Kraków, Poland
- Height: 1.75 m (5 ft 9 in)
- Position: Defender

Team information
- Current team: Piłkarz Podłęże (manager)

Youth career
- 1963–1971: Wisła Kraków

Senior career*
Years	Team	Apps	(Gls)
1971–1985	Wisła Kraków	230	(3)
1985–1986	Cracovia		
1986	SV Langenrohr		
1987–1990	Polish-American Eagles		

International career
1979	Poland	1	(0)

Managerial career
- Wisła Kraków (youth)
- Olimpic Kraków (youth)
- Wawel Kraków (youth)
- Wisła Kraków (youth)
- 2005: LKS Śledziejowice
- Olimpic Kraków (youth)
- Tramwaj Kraków
- Raba Dobczyce
- 2007–2008: Michałowianka Michałowice
- 2008–2009: Wawel Kraków
- 2010: Skawinka Skawina
- 2010–2011: Halniak Maków Podhalański
- Lesser Poland FA (youth)
- 2014: Kmita Zabierzów
- 2014: Kmita Zabierzów II
- 2017: Wolni Kłaj
- 2017–: Piłkarz Podłęże
- * Club domestic league appearances and goals

Henryk Szymanowski (born 11 April 1952) is a Polish football manager and former player who played as a defender. He played in one match for the Poland national team in 1979. His brother Antoni was also a footballer.

== Honours ==
Wisła Kraków

- Ekstraklasa: 1977–78
