= Hédiard =

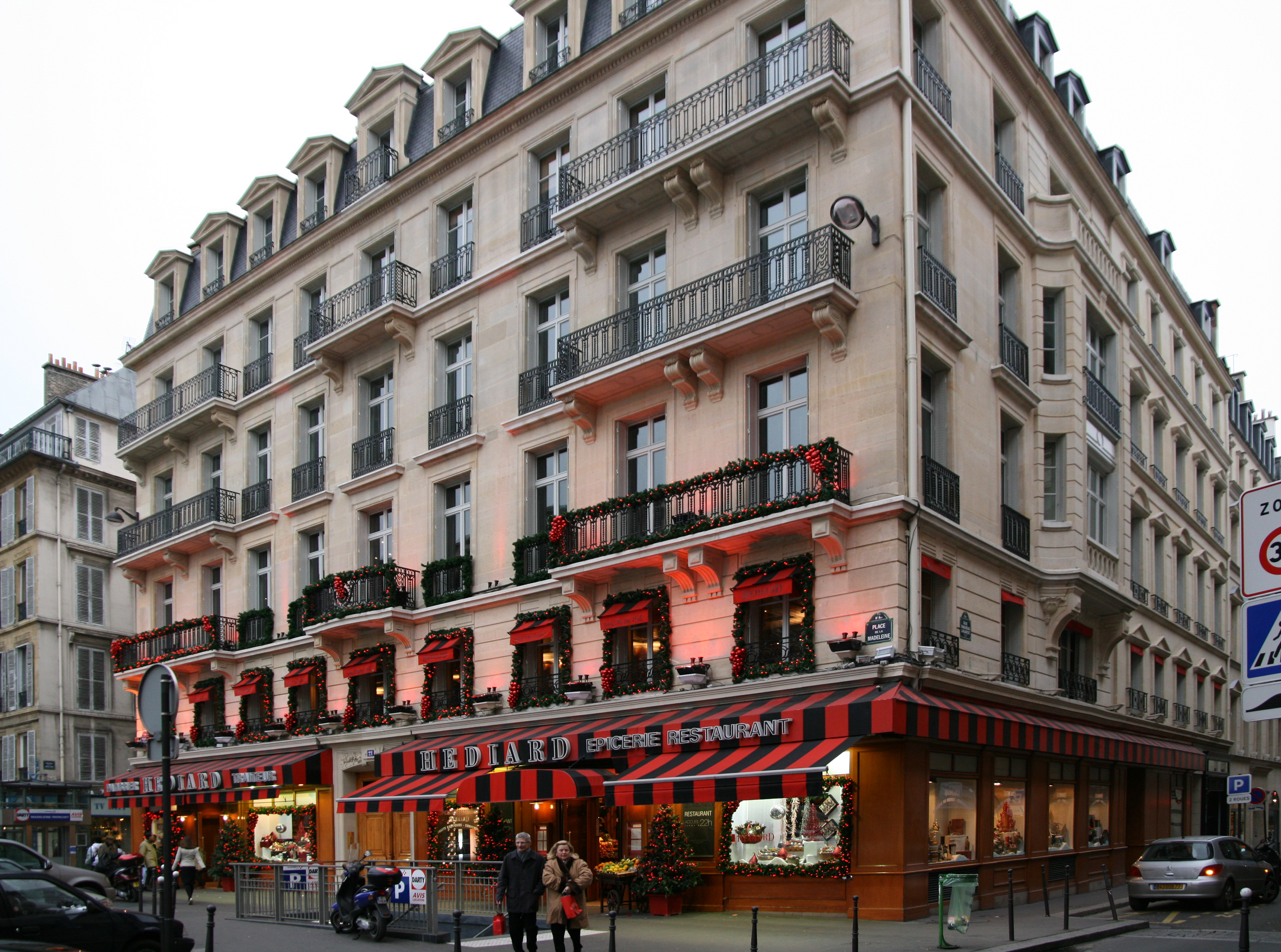
Paris store

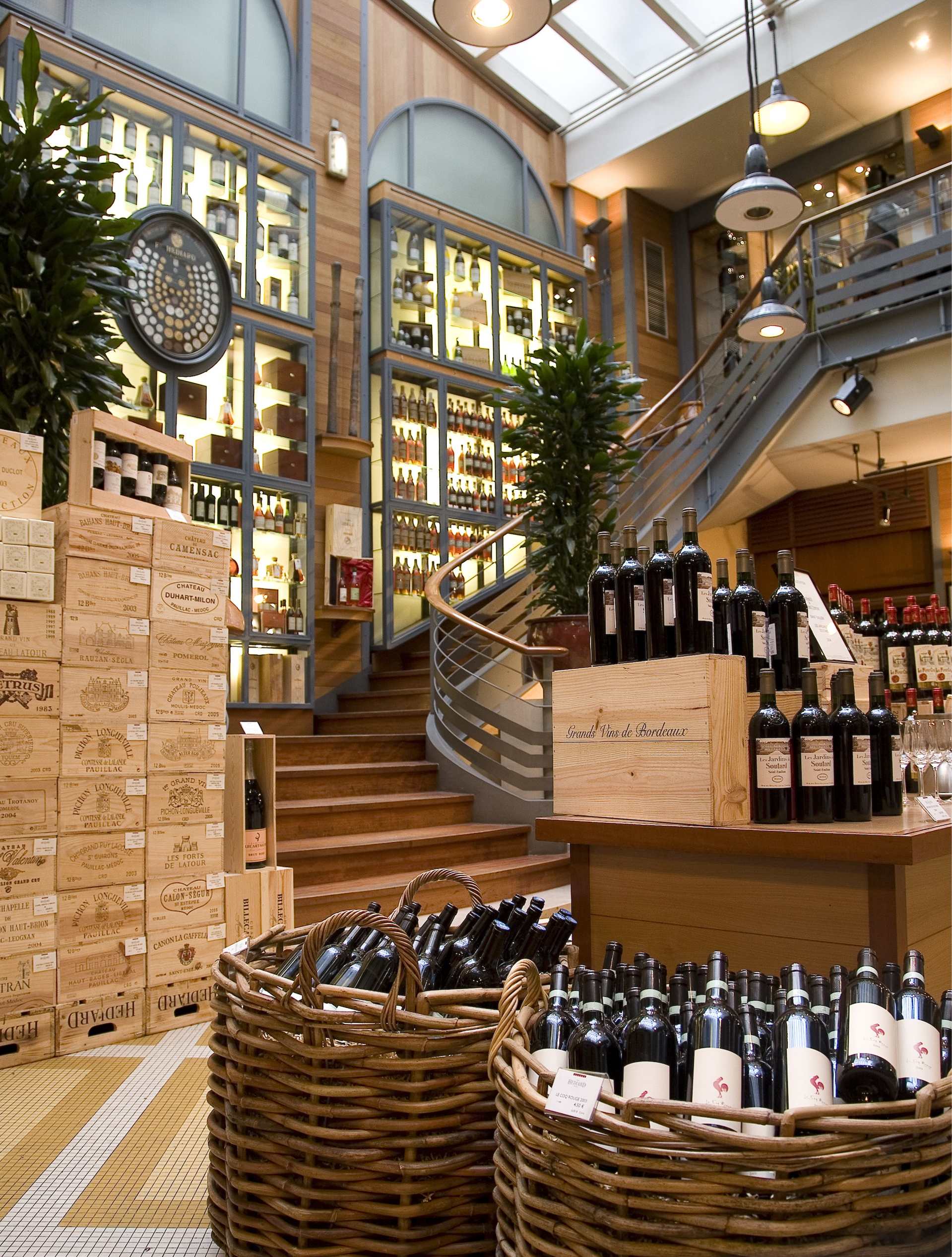
Inside the Paris store

Hédiard is a French luxury food company. Founded in 1854, it has a main store in Paris and thirty stores around the world.

== History ==
The business was founded in 1854 by Ferdinand Etienne Hédiard as a colonial goods store named Comptoir d'épices et des colonies. It stayed in the family until 1987, when it was acquired by Guinness.

Hédiard was bought by French businessman Jean-Louis Masurel in 1991, and then by Monegasque billionaire Michel Pastor in 1995. It was subsequently acquired by Russian billionaire Sergey Pugachyov in 2007. As of 2013, Hédiard had stores in 30 countries globally.

The company filed for bankruptcy in 2013. Hédiard was then acquired by Do & Co in June 2014.
