= Antoni Szymanowski =

Polish footballer

Personal information
- Full name: Antoni Jan Szymanowski
- Date of birth: 13 January 1951 (age 75)
- Place of birth: Tomaszów Mazowiecki, Poland
- Height: 1.80 m (5 ft 11 in)
- Position: Right-back

Youth career
- 1963–1968: Wisła Kraków

Senior career*
Years	Team	Apps	(Gls)
1968–1970	Wisła Kraków	41	(0)
1970–1972	Gwardia Warsaw	24	(0)
1972–1978	Wisła Kraków	160	(1)
1978–1981	Gwardia Warsaw	39	(0)
1981–1984	Club Brugge	51	(0)
Total		315	(1)

International career
1970–1980	Poland	82	(1)

Managerial career
- Cracovia
- 1985–1986: Cracovia
- 1987: CKS Czeladź
- 2002–2004: Wisła Kraków II
- 2005–2008: Przebój Wolbrom
- 2009: Przebój Wolbrom
Medal record
Men's football
Representing Poland
FIFA World Cup
Third place	1974 West Germany
Olympic Games
Gold medal – first place	1972 Munich	Team
Silver medal – second place	1976 Montreal	Team
- * Club domestic league appearances and goals

Antoni Jan Szymanowski (born 13 January 1951) is a Polish football manager and former player who played as a right-back. He was a member of the Poland national football team for two FIFA World Cups: 1974 and 1978. During those tournaments his club was Wisła Kraków. Szymanowski was one of the best defenders in Poland during the golden era of Polish football. In the later years of his career, he played for the Belgian team Club Brugge. His brother Henryk was a footballer as well.

He also competed for Poland at the 1972 and 1976 Summer Olympics.

== International ==
Appearances and goals by national team and year
National team	Year	Apps	Goals
Poland	1970	4	0
Poland	1971	2	0
Poland	1972	7	0
Poland	1973	12	0
Poland	1974	12	0
Poland	1975	10	0
Poland	1976	8	1
Poland	1977	2	0
Poland	1978	14	0
Poland	1979	8	0
Poland	1980	3	0
Total		82	1

Scores and results list Poland's goal tally first, score column indicates score after each Szymanowski goal.

List of international goals scored by Antoni Szymanowski
No.	Date	Venue	Opponent	Score	Result	Competition
1	25 July 1976	Montreal, Canada	North Korea	4–0	5–0	1976 Summer Olympics

== Honours ==
Wisła Kraków

- Ekstraklasa: 1977–78
- UEFA Intertoto Cup: 1969, 1970, 1973

Poland

- Olympic gold medal: 1972
- Olympic silver medal: 1976
- FIFA World Cup third place: 1974

Individual

- Polish Footballer of the Year: 1975 (Sport editors plebiscite "Golden Shoe")
- Polish Football Association National Team of the Century: 1919–2019
