= Zofia Szymanowska-Lenartowicz =

Polish painter and poet (1825–1870)

Zofia Szymanowska–Lenartowicz
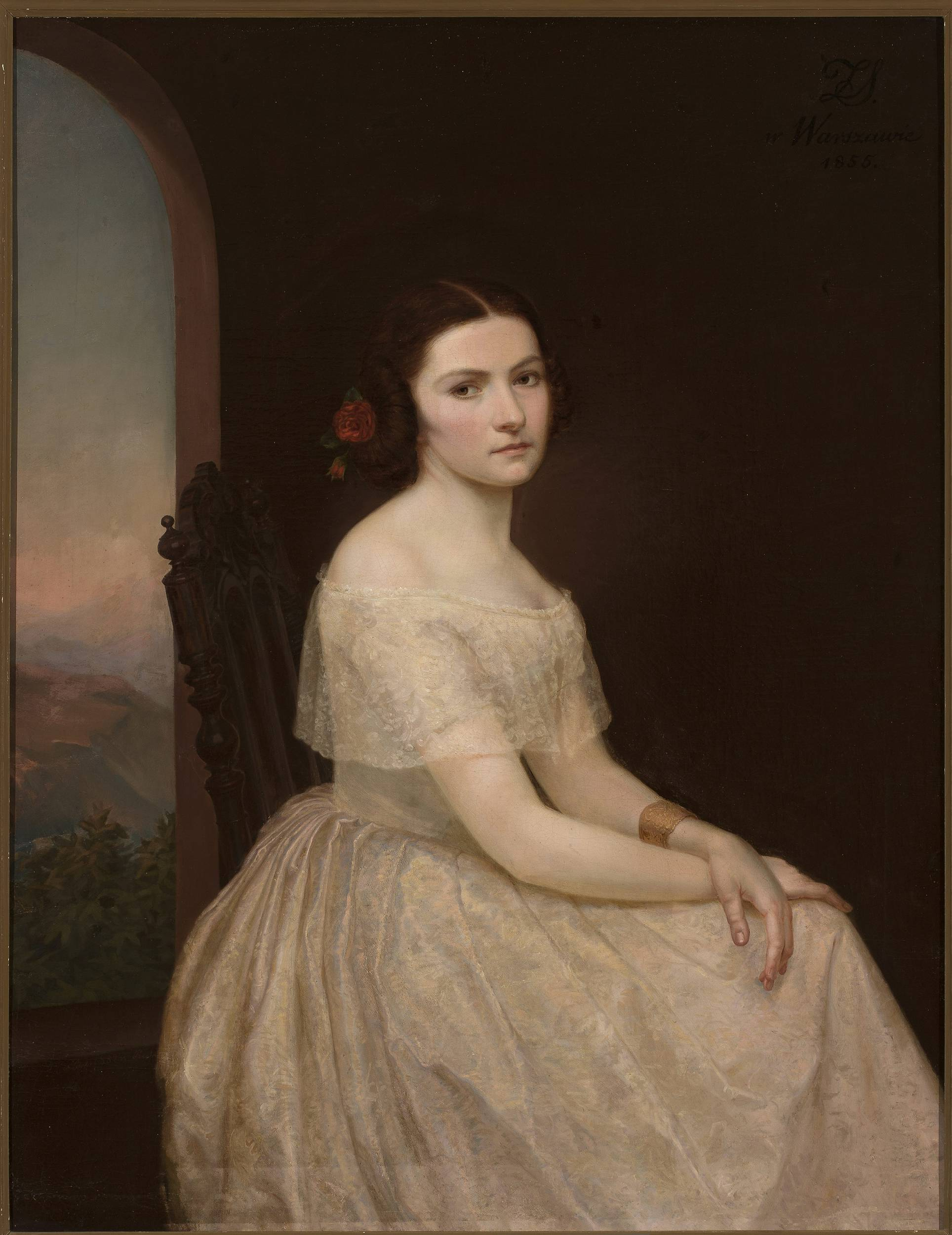
- Self-portrait (1855), oil on canvas (from the National Museum in Warsaw)
- Born: Zofia Szymanowska; 21 December 1825; Otwock, Congress Poland, Russian Empire
- Died: 8 July 1870 (aged 44); Miłosław, Poland
- Burial place: Miłosław, Poland
- Occupations: Painter, poet, musician
- Spouse: Teofil Lenartowicz (m. 1861)
- Children: 1

Zofia Szymanowska–Lenartowicz (21 December 1825 – 8 July 1870) was a Polish painter, musician, and poet. She painted many portraits of the Mickiewicz family, particularly Adam Mickiewicz.

== Biography ==
Zofia Szymanowska was born on 21 December 1825, in Otwock, Congress Kingdom of Poland (now Poland). She was the daughter of Józef Szymanowski (1785–1832) and his second wife, Elżbieta (née Młodzianowska, 1791–1847), her family was ennobled Jewish Frankists.

She was a half-sister of Celina Szymanowska, who was married to poet Adam Mickiewicz. Szymanowska–Lenartowicz had lived with the Mickiewicz family in Paris from 1850 until 1855, and helped with their childcare. She was educated in Dresden and in Paris, and in the studio of Ary Scheffer, and Aleksander Lesser.

In 1861, she married poet Teofil Lenartowicz in Florence, Italy, with whom she had a son Jan (John) who died shortly after his birth in 1864.

She died after struggling with pneumonia on 8 July 1870, in Miłosław, Poland. Her artwork can be found in the collections at the National Museum in Warsaw, and the National Museum in Kraków.
