= Colonial goods store =

Retailers of goods from European colonies

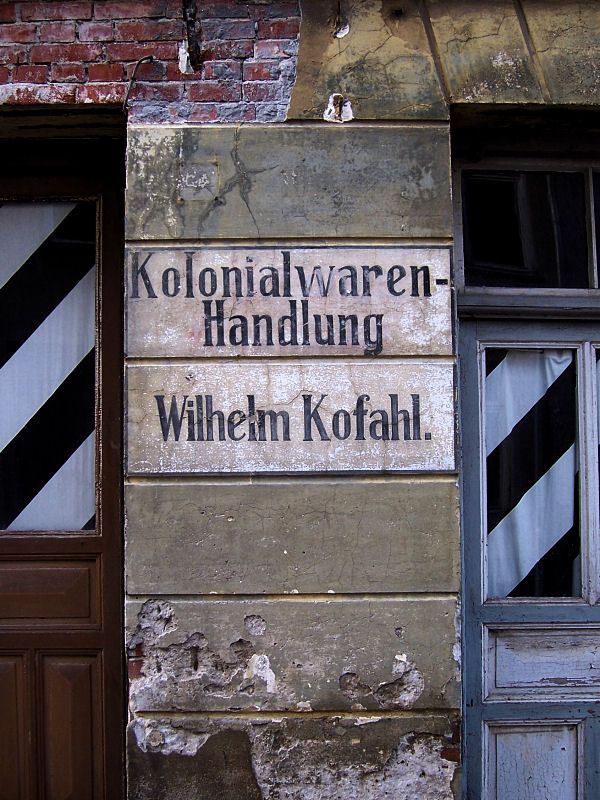
Advertisement in the old city centre of Wismar, in modern-day Germany

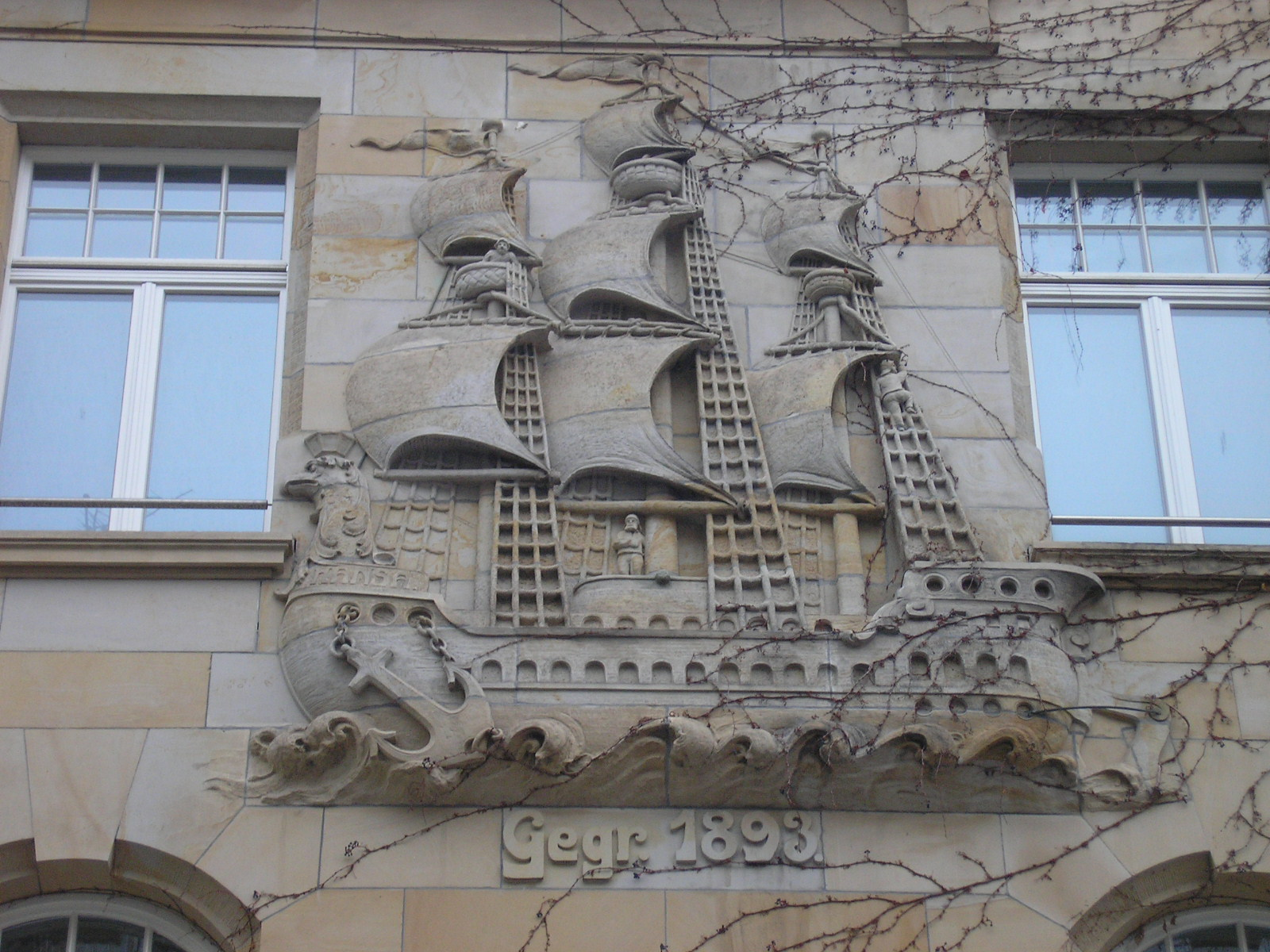
A ship symbolising foreign trade on the outside of a colonial goods shop in Gotha (founded 1893)

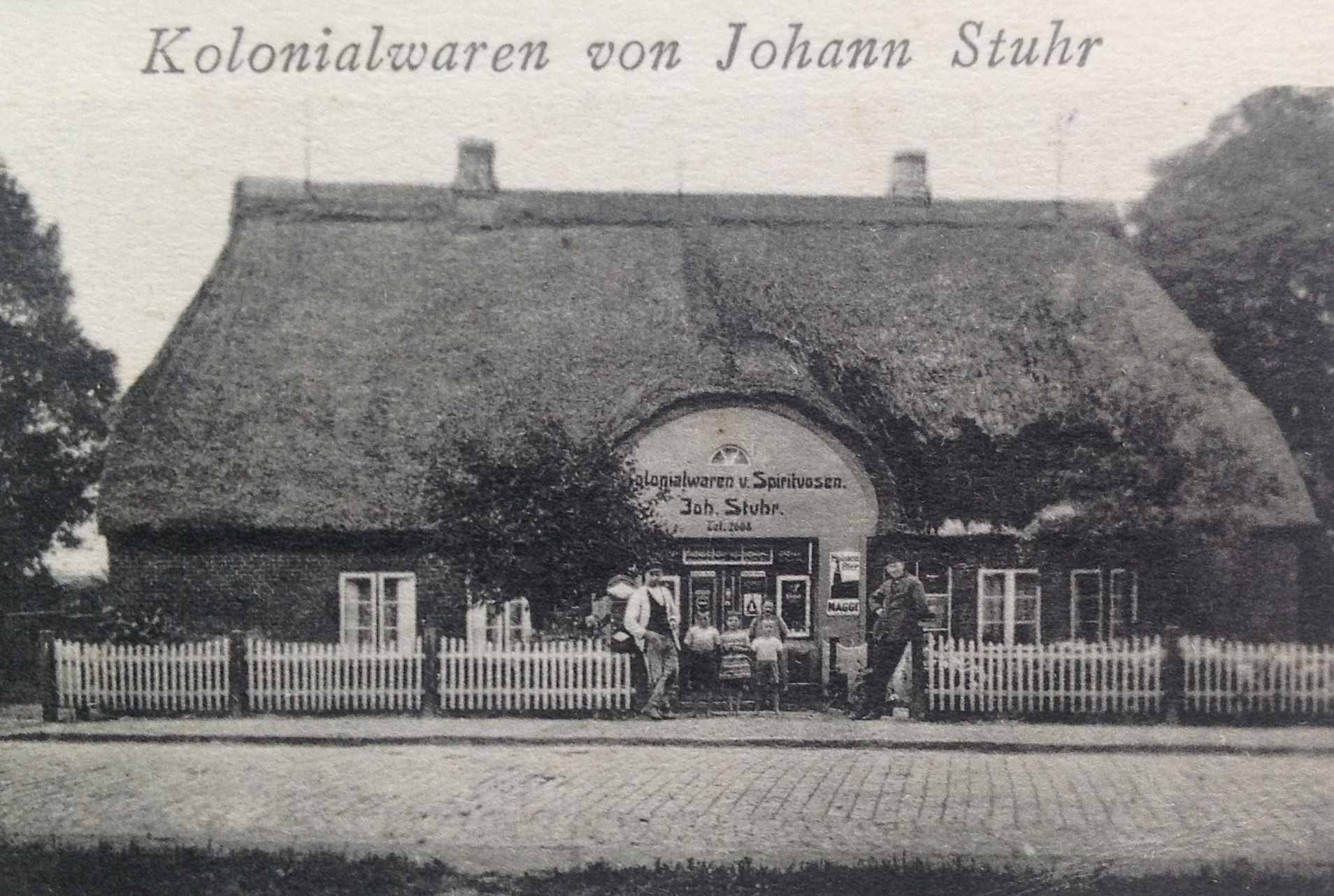
Colonial goods store, Schülldorf, around 1930

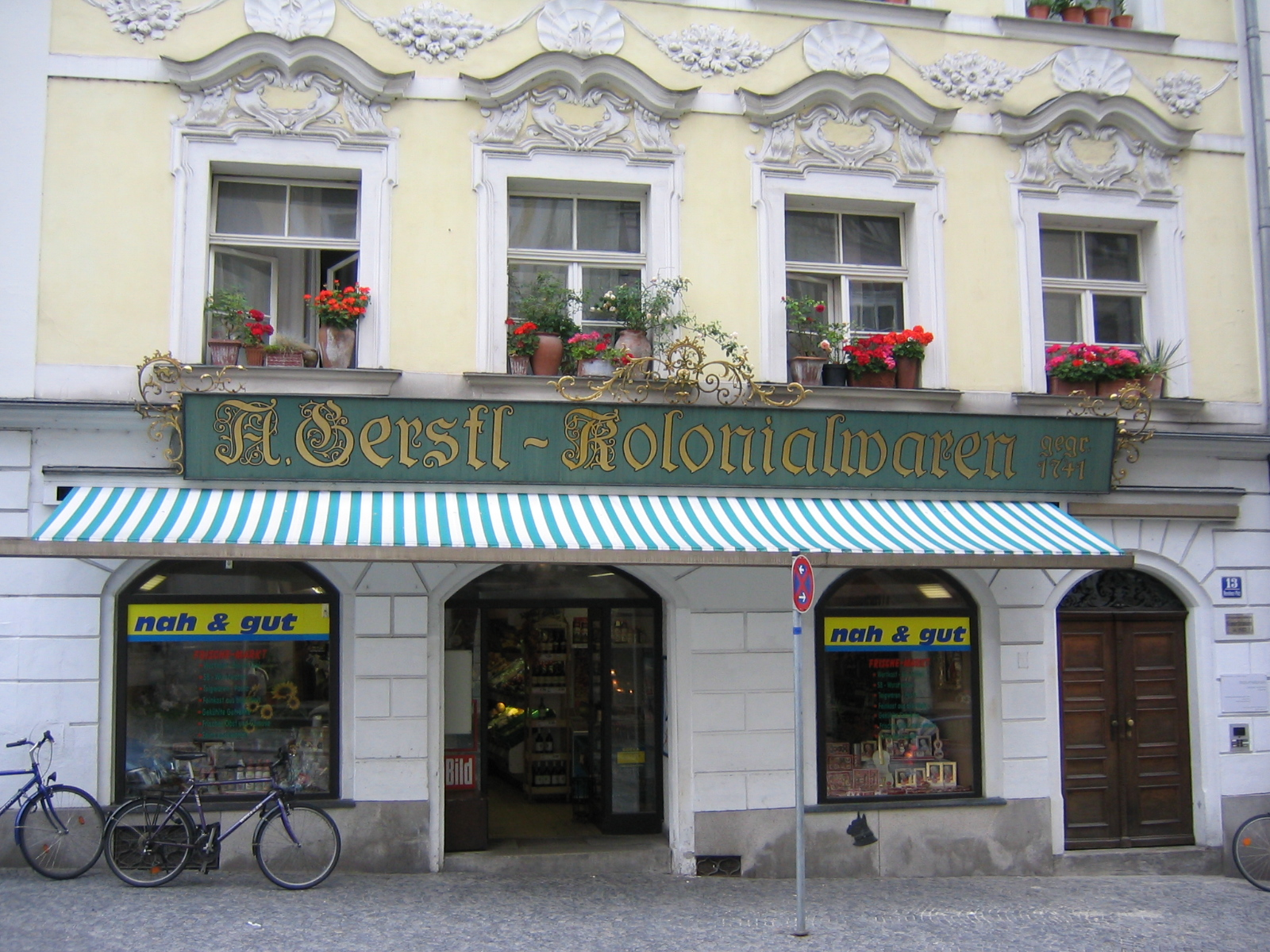
A colonial goods shop in Passau, 2005. (The logo indicates that the shop is affiliated with Edeka.)

Colonial goods stores are retailers of foods and other consumer goods imported from European colonies, called colonial goods. During the nineteenth century, they formed a distinct category of retailer in much of Europe, specializing in imported, non-perishable dry goods like coffee, tea, spices, rice, sugar, cocoa and chocolate, and tobacco.

By the mid-twentieth century, these stores had become general grocery stores selling a variety of commodities that were easy to store, as contrasted with greengrocers, butchers, bakers, fishmongers, and so on. With the advent of supermarkets, the name "colonial stores" continued to be used, despite the end of colonialism, for small, independent stores.

Such stores existed across Europe. In German, they were called Kolonialwaren 'colonial goods', in French, comptoir des colonies 'colonial store', in Italian, coloniali 'colonials', and in Spanish and Portuguese, ultramarinos 'overseas (goods)'. The luxury grocer Hédiard started as a colonial goods store, originally named Comptoir d'épices et des colonies. In Britain, Home and Colonial Stores became a major retail chain.

== Decline and legacy ==
=== Germanic and Nordic countries ===
By the end of the twentieth century, the term had largely fallen out of use, while the items in which colonial goods retailers had specialized had long since been included in the wider range of goods offered by general purpose supermarkets. Where colonial goods shops survived, they were regarded as old-fashioned, and tended to be known in Germany and Switzerland as Aunt Emma Shops, that is, "mom and pop" stores. In Austria the etymologically convoluted term Greißler is used. In Germany the earlier term is still used in Bremen by the William Holtorf Colonial Goods Shop, founded in 1874, which claims to be Germany's last colonial goods shop.

Germany's largest (in 2014) supermarket group, Edeka, preserved the word in its full name, Einkaufsgenossenschaft der Kolonialwarenhändler im Halleschen Torbezirk zu Berlin. In Denmark and Norway, the term kolonial is still commonly used by supermarkets.

=== United Kingdom ===
In the 1920s, "empire shops" were proposed by the Empire Marketing Board as a promotional vehicle for foods from the British Empire. In the end, none of these shops opened. A public art exhibit in London in 2016 used the empire shops as a way of thinking about postcolonialism and globalization.

== See also ==
- Colonial exhibition
