= Andrzej Towiański =

Polish philosopher (1799–1878)

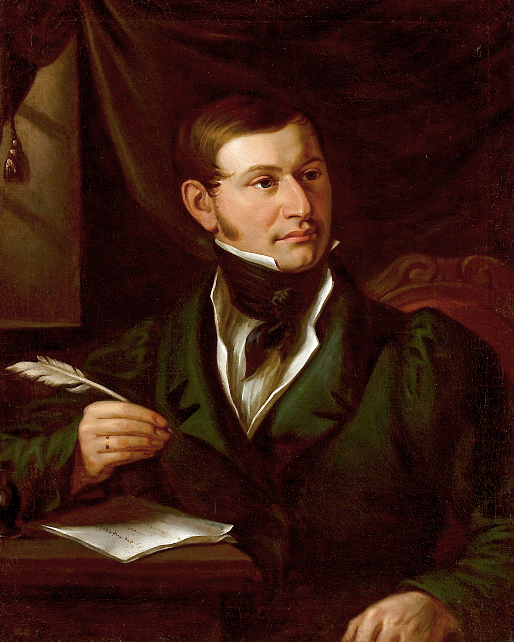
Andrzej Towiański

Andrzej Tomasz Towiański (Polish: [anˈdʐej tɔˈvʲaɲskʲi]; January 1, 1799 – May 13, 1878) was a Polish–Lithuanian philosopher and messianic religious leader.

== Life ==
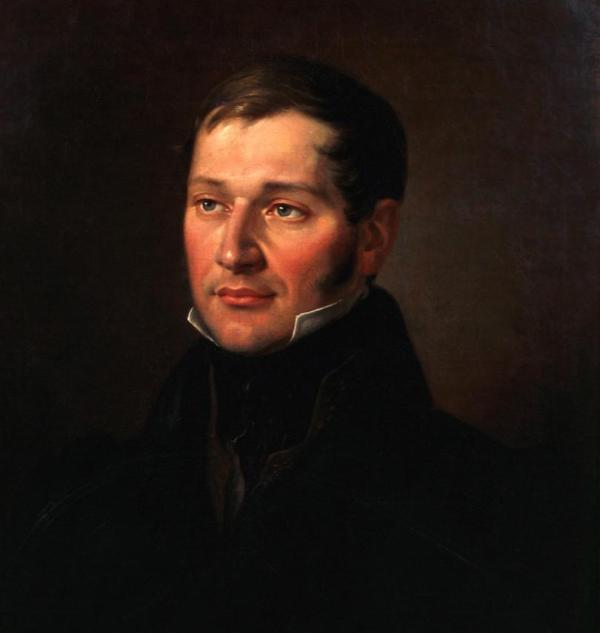
Towiański

Towiański was born in Antašventė, a village near Vilnius, which after the partitions of Poland belonged to the Russian Empire. He was the charismatic leader of the Towiańskiite sect, known also as Koło Sprawy Bożej (the Circle of God's Cause). In 1839 he experienced a vision in which the Holy Ghost and the Virgin Mary urged him to act as a messenger of the Apocalypse. The Poles, the French—particularly Napoleon—and Jews were to play leading roles. Among those influenced by his thinking were the Polish Romantic poets Adam Mickiewicz, Juliusz Słowacki, and Seweryn Goszczyński.

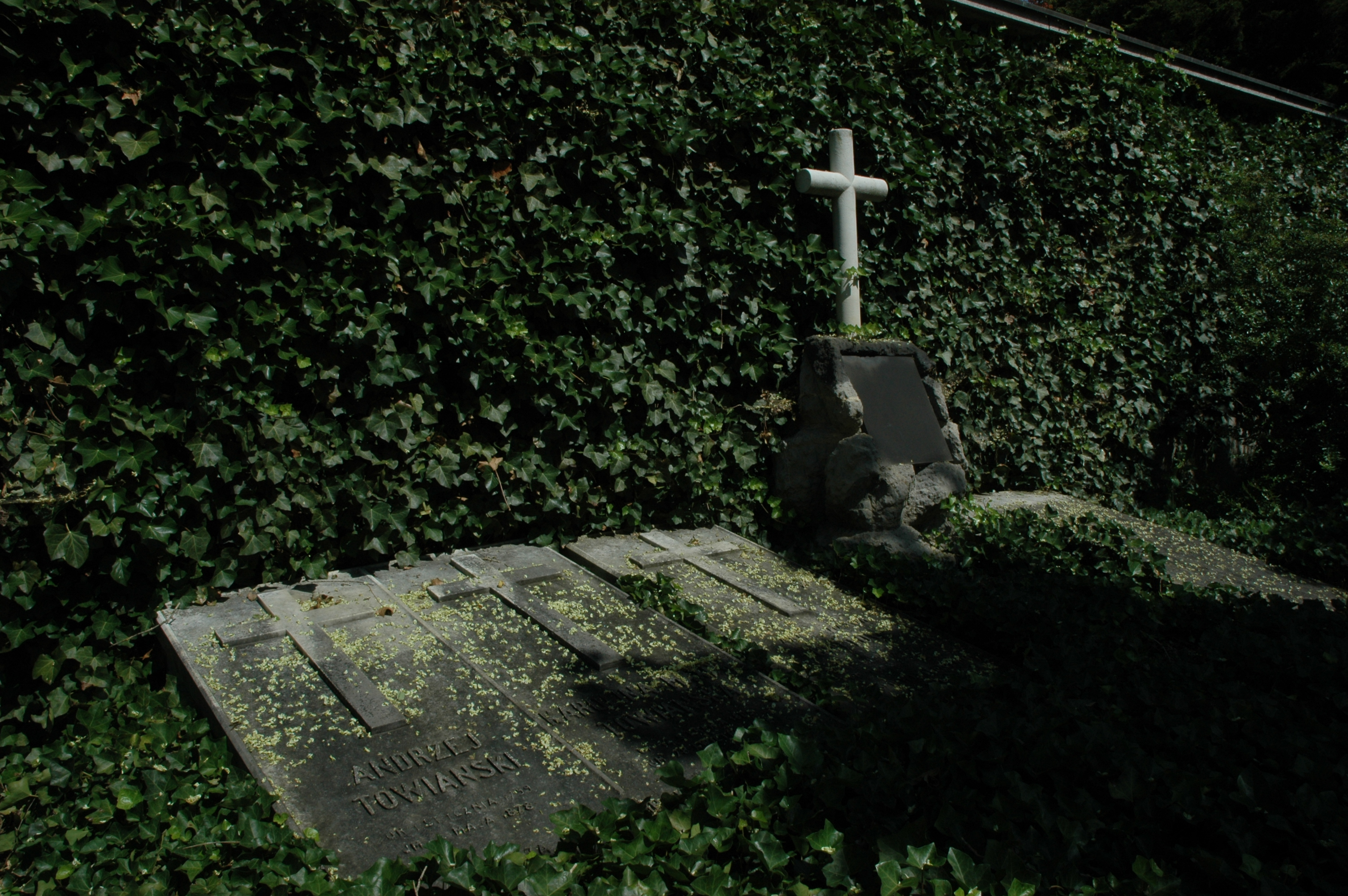
Graves of members of Koło Sprawy Bożej and their leader Andrzej Towiański

His extraordinary influence on Mickiewicz, a leader of the Polish emigre community, was divisive, and some members of the community accused him of being a Russian agent.

He died in Zurich.

== See also ==
- History of philosophy in Poland (Messianist period)
- List of Poles
