= Three Bards =

Three 19th-century Polish Romantic poets

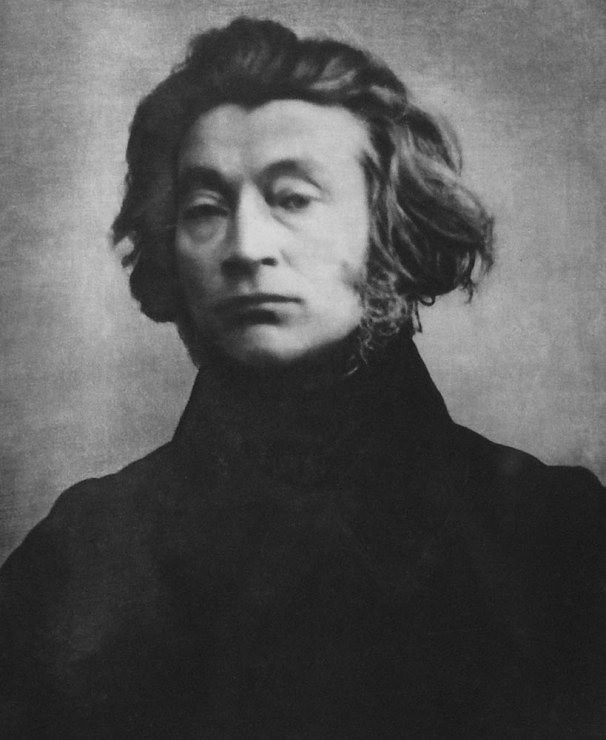
Adam Mickiewicz

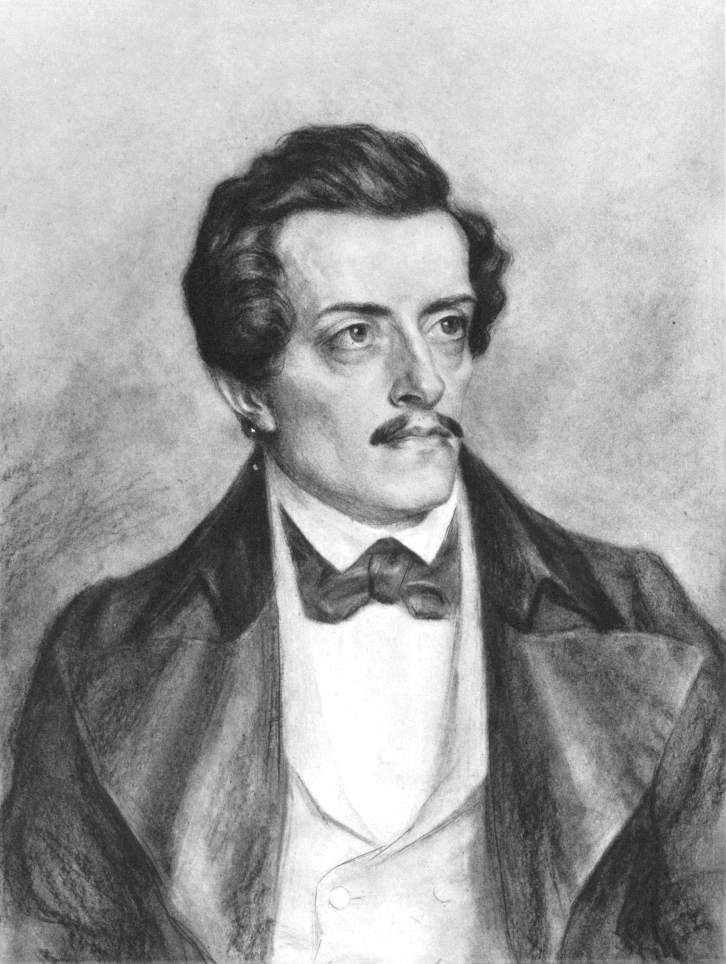
Juliusz Słowacki

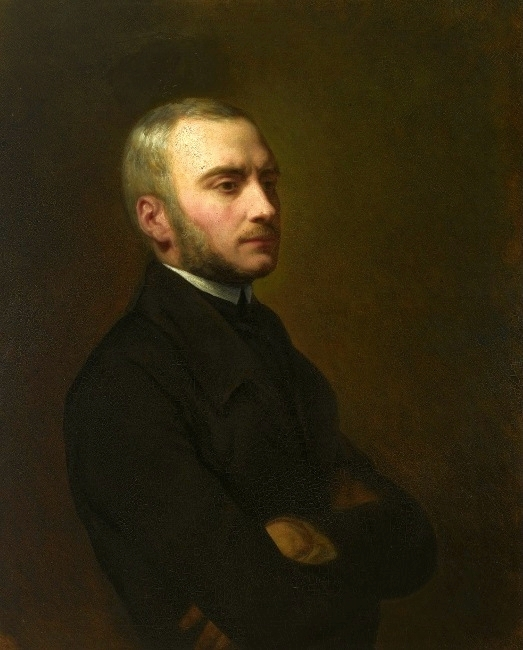
Zygmunt Krasiński

The Three Bards of Polish Romantic literature

The Three Bards (Polish: trzej wieszcze, IPA: [ˈtʂɛj ˈvjɛʂt͡ʂɛ]) are the national poets of Polish Romantic literature. The term is almost exclusively used to denote Adam Mickiewicz (1798–1855), Juliusz Słowacki (1809–1849) and Zygmunt Krasiński (1812–1859). Of the three, Mickiewicz is considered the most influential and Krasiński the least.

The Three Bards were thought not only to voice Polish national sentiments but to foresee their nation's future. They lived and worked in exile following the partitions of Poland, which had ended the existence of the independent Polish state. Their tragic poetical plays and epic poetry, written in the aftermath of the 1830 Uprising against Russian rule, revolved around the Polish struggle for independence from the three occupying foreign empires.

The concept of the "Three Bards" emerged in the second half of the 19th century and remains influential among scholars of Polish literature. At the same time, it has been criticized by some as anachronistic. As Krasiński's influence has waned, some have suggested replacing him in the trinity with Cyprian Norwid, or adding Norwid or Stanisław Wyspiański as a fourth bard.

== Meaning ==
The Polish term "wieszcz " (IPA: [/vjɛʂt͡ʂ/]) is often understood in the history of Polish literature as denoting a "poet-prophet" or "soothsayer". This term, often rendered in English as "bard" (in the "bard" sense of "a poet, especially an exalted national poet"), was an approximation to the ancient Latin poeta vates ('poet-prophet') – the poet to whom the gods had granted the ability to see the future.

The term "Three Bards" (Polish: trzej wieszcze) is applied almost exclusively to Adam Mickiewicz (1798–1855), Juliusz Słowacki (1809–1849), and Zygmunt Krasiński (1812–1859), the most celebrated Romantic poets of Poland. Of the three, Mickiewicz is considered the most, Krasiński the least, influential.

Of the trio, Mickiewicz – the master of the epic and lyric – has been called the poet of the present; Krasiński – the prophet and seer – the poet who foretells the future; Słowacki – the dramatist – the panegyrist of the past. Another scheme portrays Mickiewicz as the "positive voice of history", Słowacki as "the voice of the 'demonic' dark side of the fate of the Polish nation", and Krasiński as "the voice of Polish Catholicism".

== History ==
Imported to Poland around the 16th century along with many other Sarmatisms, the term wieszcz was initially applied to poets generically, sometimes to foreign ones like Homer, and sometimes to native ones like Jan Kochanowski (sometimes called "the wieszcz of Czarnolas"). However, with the 19th-century advent of Romanticism, the term began to be applied almost exclusively to the trio of Mickiewicz, Słowacki, and Krasiński. Mickiewicz himself endorsed the use of the term, in 1842 calling himself a wieszcz. Though the three poets did not form a particular poetic group or movement, they all began to be seen as spiritual leaders of a nation deprived of its political freedom (Poland ceased to exist as an independent state in 1795, following the partitions of Poland, and would not reestabilish full sovereignty until 1918). They also often adverted to folklore which linked the expression wieszcz to folk sages, such as Wernyhora, of legend and folk tale.

The portrayal of Mickiewicz, Słowacki, and Krasiński as the three most important poets in Polish history can be traced to the 1860 expanded edition of Lesław Łukaszewicz's Rys dziejów literatury polskiej ('Outline of the History of Polish Literature'). This view was popularized in the Great Emigration period by other works on literary history, such as those by Julian Bartoszewicz and Włodzimierz Spasowicz; and by succeeding decades of Polish textbooks, contributing to the establishment of a Polish literary canon.

This idea has endured, though at times criticized by scholars (particularly, in the early 20th century, by Adolf Nowaczyński and Jan Nepomucen Miller) as anachronistic or otherwise incorrect. There has also been discussion concerning whether one of the Three Bards – particularly Krasiński – deserves to be one of the trio, and whether the trio should be expanded to include other poets. Nonetheless, according to literary historian Kazimierz Wyka, since the mid-20th century the trio of Bards – Mickiewicz, Słowacki, Krasiński – has been recognized as historical and classic, and as such, immuatable, despite periodic criticisms and challenges.

== The Fourth Bard ==
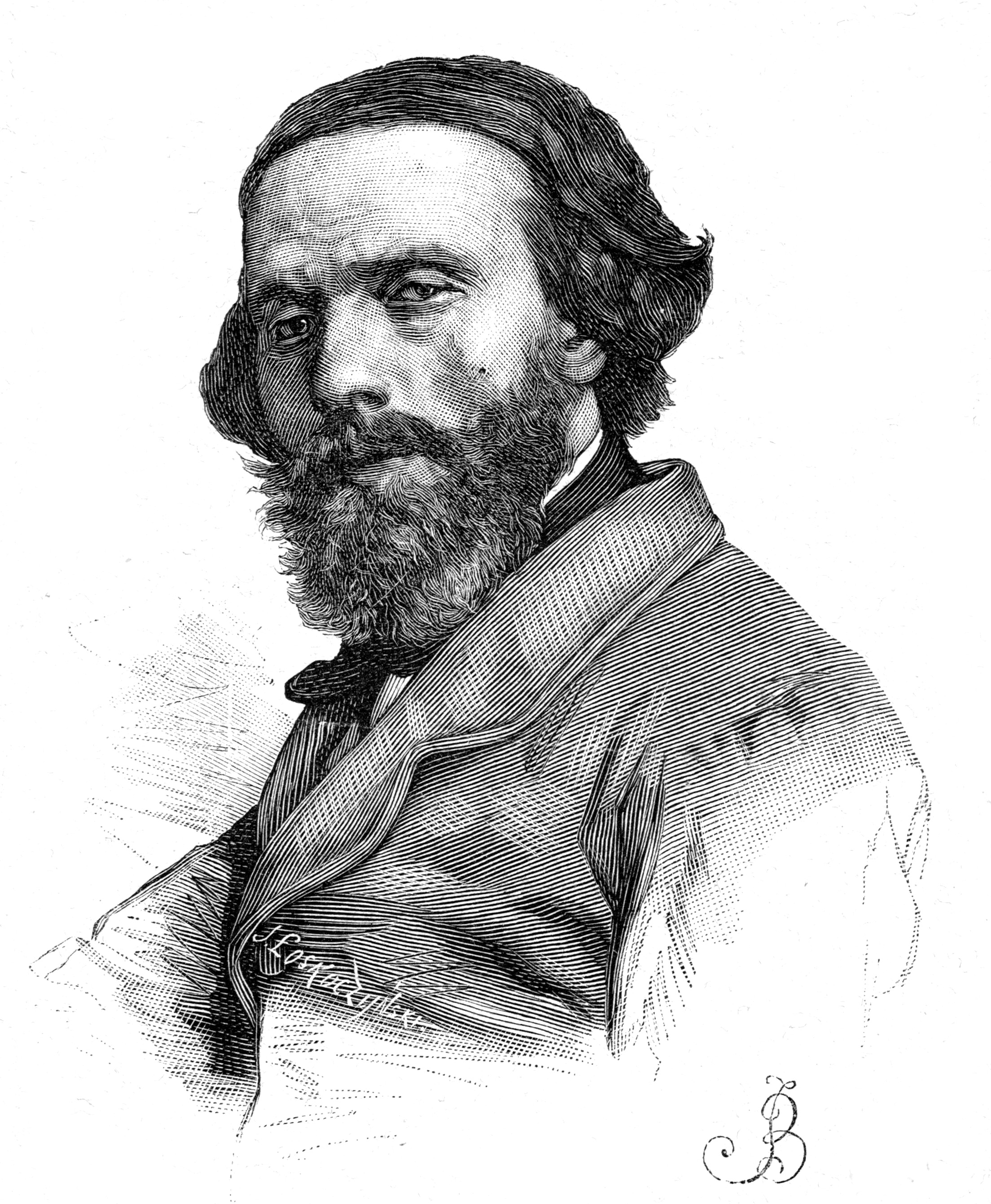
Cyprian Norwid

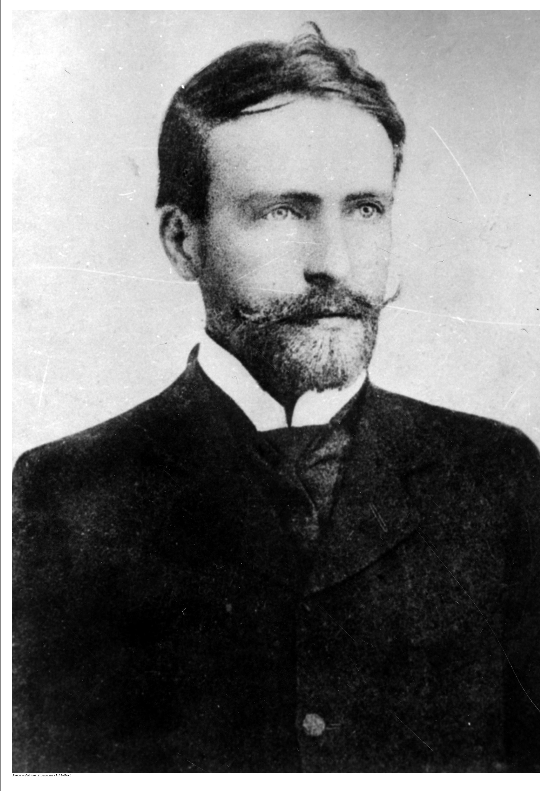
Stanisław Wyspiański

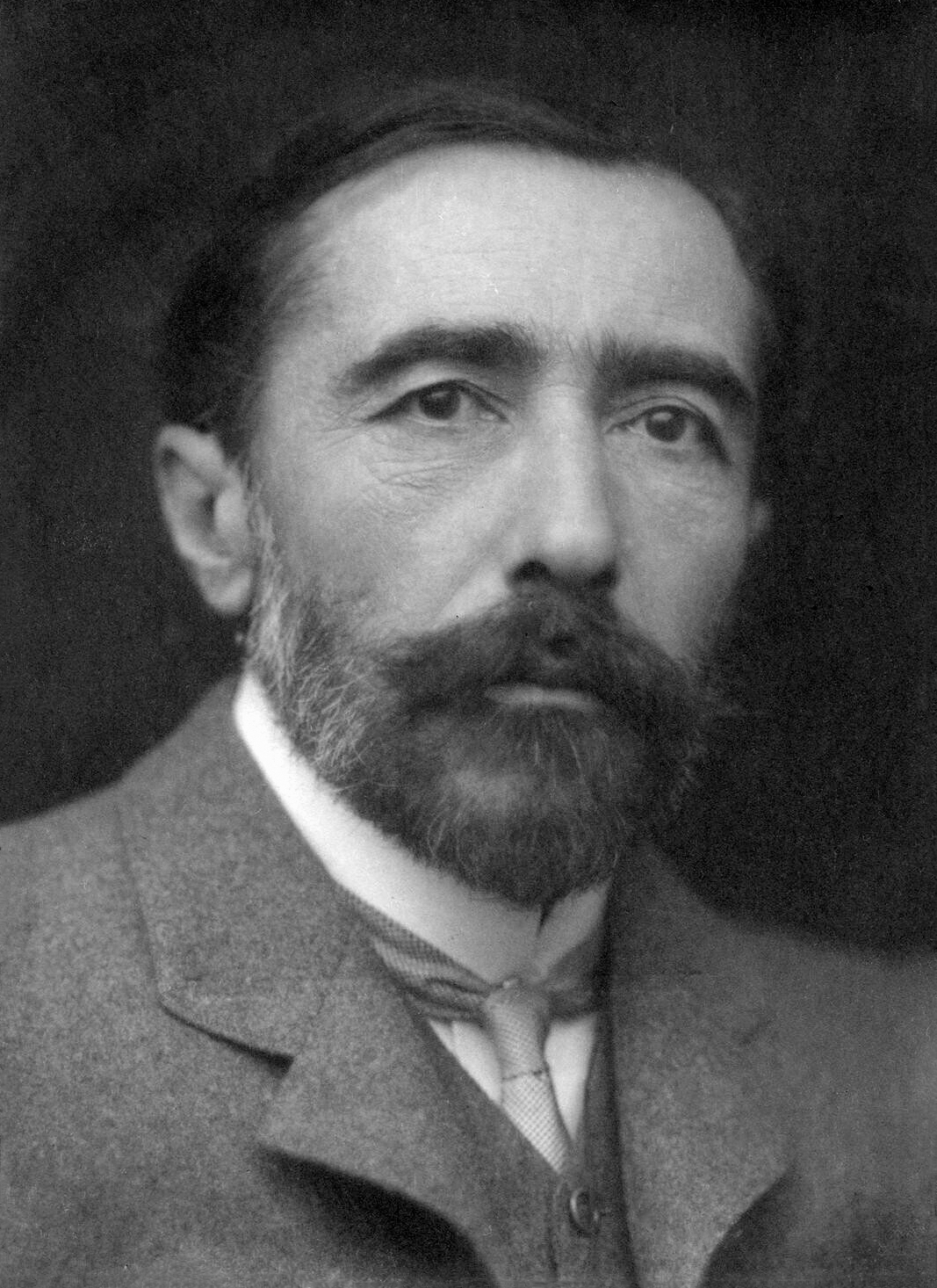
Joseph Conrad

Contenders to the title of Fourth Bard of Polish literature

The early-20th-century rediscovery of the writings of Cyprian Norwid (1821–1883) led some to call him a "fourth bard" or to count him among the "four greated poets of Poland". Unlike the writings of the Three Bards, Norwid's were not popular in his lifetime or for several decades thereafter. Consequently, according to Polish literary critics Przemysław Czapliński, Tamara Trojanowska, and Joanna Niżyńska, his work "remained isolated [and] unnoticed", and was "overshadowed by the three earlier literary 'giants' [Mickiewicz, Słowacki, and Krasiński] long celebrated in exile and at home"; hence Norwid failed to influence or affect his contemporaries to the extent that did the Three Bards.

Some literary critics, however, have been so skeptical of the value of Krasiński's work as to consider Norwid a third rather than a fourth bard.

Other critics have nominated Stanisław Wyspiański (1869–1907) as fourth bard. His 1901 play The Wedding (Wesele) is considered the last great classic of Polish drama, and Rochelle Heller Stone writes that it alone "earned him the title of fourth bard".

Literary historian Józef Ujejski named Joseph Conrad another bard. Other 19th-century writers who have been called bards include Józef Bohdan Zaleski, Seweryn Goszczyński, Wincenty Pol, and Kornel Ujejski. 20th-century poets who have been called Polish bards include Witold Gombrowicz and Nobel laureate Czesław Miłosz.

== Visual arts ==
In the visual arts, the term wieszcz has occasionally been applied to Jan Matejko and Artur Grottger as, respectively, the first and second Polish bards of painting, with either Józef Brandt or Henryk Siemiradzki most commonly named a third bard.

== See also ==
- History of philosophy in Poland § Polish Messianism
- Romanticism in Poland
- Tymon Zaborowski — also known as "Wieszcz Miodoboru" ('the Bard of the Honey Harvest')
