= Statue of Taras Shevchenko (Warsaw) =

Monument in Szczecin, Poland

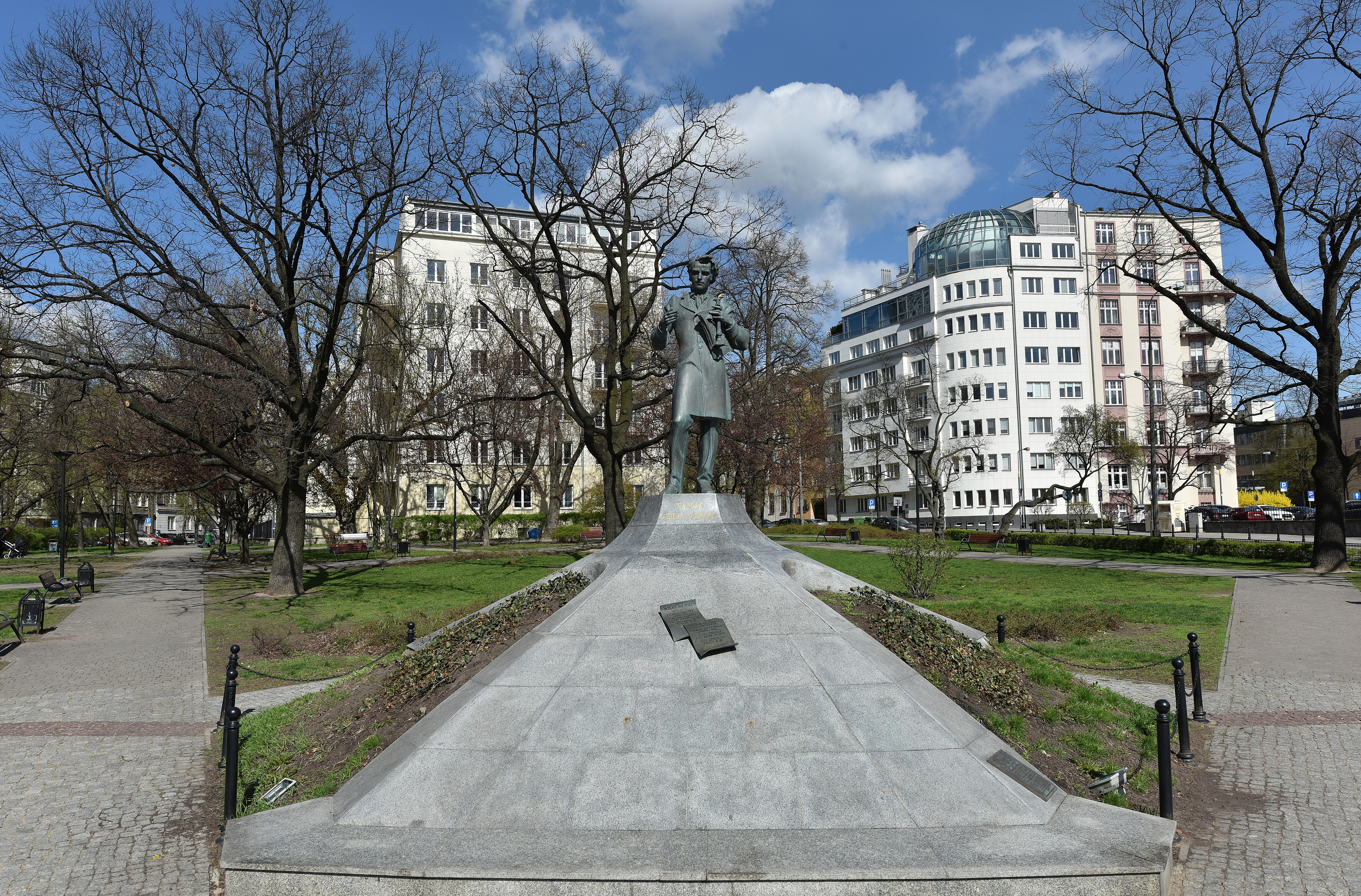
- The monument in 2017.
- Interactive map of Statue of Taras Shevchenko
- Location: Shevchenko Square, Mokotów, Warsaw, Poland
- Coordinates: 52°12′41.79″N 21°01′24.48″E
- Designer: Anatolij Kuszcz (statue); Baltazar Brukalski (pedestal)
- Type: Statue
- Material: Bronze
- Height: 5.1 m (17 ft)
- Opening date: 13 March 2002
- Dedicated to: Taras Shevchenko

The statue of Taras Shevchenko (Polish: Pomnik Tarasa Szewczenki; Ukrainian: Пам'ятник Тарасові Шевченку, romanized: Pam'yatnyk Tarasovi Shevchenku) is a monument in Warsaw, Poland, located within the Old Mokotów neighbourhood. It is placed at the Shevchenko Square, at the corner of Goworka, Chocimska, and Spacerowa Streets. The monument has a form of a bronze statue, dedicated to Taras Shevchenko, a 19th-century poet, writer, and political activist. It was designed by Anatolij Kuszcz and Baltazar Brukalski, and unveiled on 13 March 2002.

== History ==
The statue was designed by Anatolij Kuszcz, while its pedestal and surroundings, by Baltazar Brukalski. The monument was dedicated to Taras Shevchenko, a 19th-century poet, writer, and political activist, commemorating his visit to Warsaw in 1830. It was proposed by Dmytro Pavlychko, the ambassador of Ukraine in Poland, and financed by the Association of Ukrainians in Poland, Kyiv City Council, Lviv Oblast administration, and the embassy of Ukraine in Poland. The installation of the statue and construction of its pedestal and surroundings were financed by companies Edbud and Edbud Lviv.

The monument was unveiled on 13 March 2002, by Włodzimierz Cimoszewicz, the Prime Minister of Poland, and Anatoliy Zlenko, the Minister of Foreign Affairs of Ukraine. Prior to this, on 10 October 2000, a commemorative plaque dedicated to Shevchenko, was unveiled on one of the houses near the square, which was then named in his honour.

The monument was realised with an agreement between the governments of Poland and Ukraine, as part of which, a statue of Juliusz Słowacki, a 19th-century poet and writer, and a major figure in the Polish Romantic period, was unveiled in Kyiv in 2012.

In 2004, an orange scarf was wrapped around the statue, as an act of support for the Orange Revolution in Ukraine, and in 2014, it was decorated with flags of Poland and Ukraine, during the Euromaidan demonstrations.

== Overview ==
The monument is placed at the Shevchenko Square, at the corner of Goworka, Chocimska, and Spacerowa Streets. The bronze statue of Taras Shevchenko forms its main element. He is depicted as a young adult, wearing a longcoat, and holding a candelabra and manuscript with his right hand, close to his chest. The statue is placed on top of a curved piramid-like pedestal, with a hexagonal shape. On the front, it features a bronze sculpture with a form of two sheets of paper, with the final verse of Shevchenko's poem To the Poles (Ukrainian: Полякам), inscribed on them in Polish and Ukrainian. It reads:

Ukrainian inscription

Подай же руку козакові
І серце чистеє подай!
І знову іменем Христовим
Ми оновим наш тихий рай.

Translation:
English translation

Give your hand to the Cossack
And give your pure heart!
And again in the name of Christ
We will renew our quiet paradise.

Polish inscription

Podaj że rękę bracie – Lasze
Miejsce mi w sercu swoim daj
A odzyskamy szczęście nasze
W imię Chrystusa cichy raj.

Translation:
English translation

Give me your hand, brother Lach
Give me a place in your heart
And we will regain our happiness
In the name of Christ a quiet paradise.

The monument has a total height of 5.1 m.

== Gallery ==
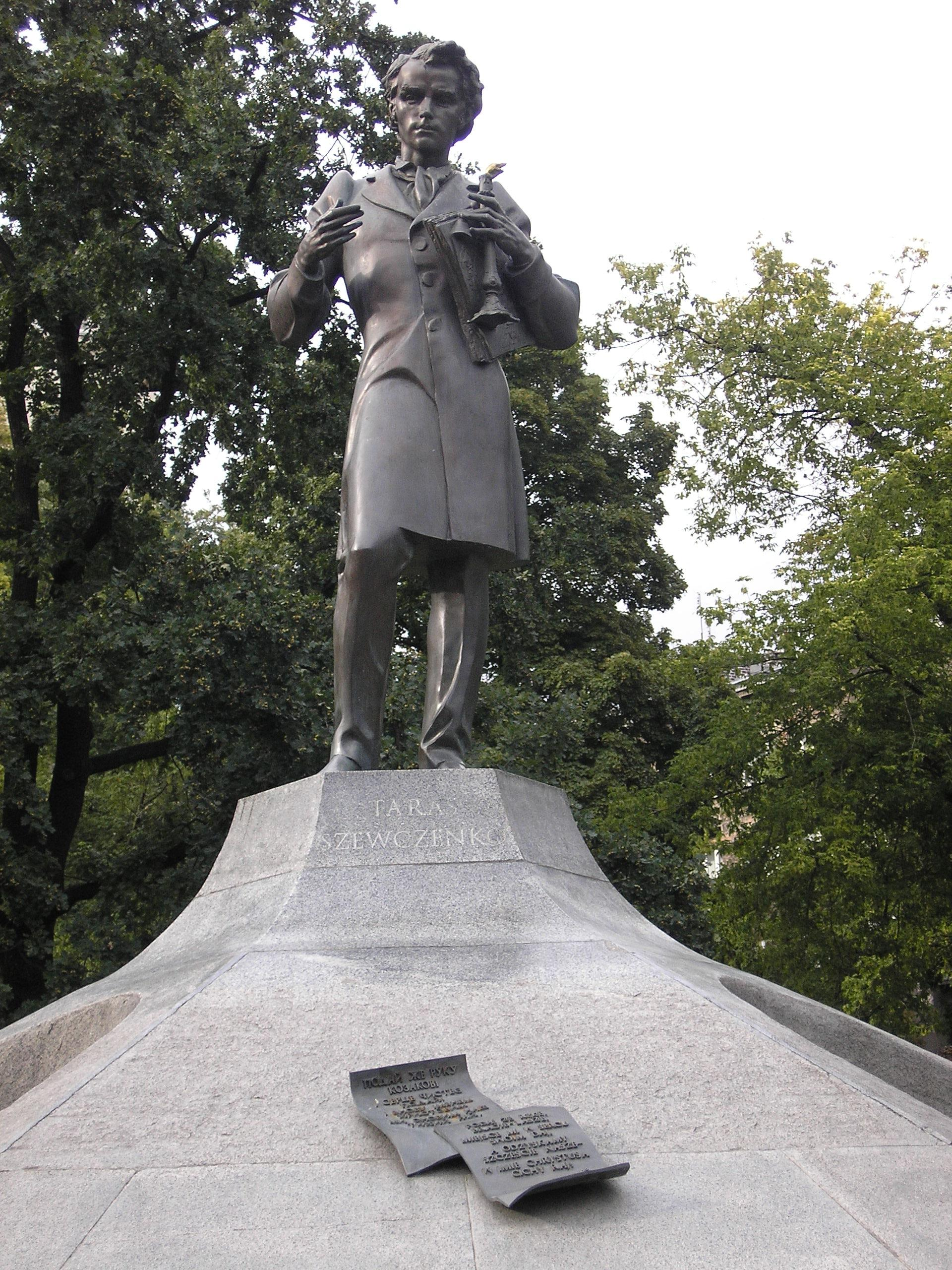
The statue of Taras Shevchenko

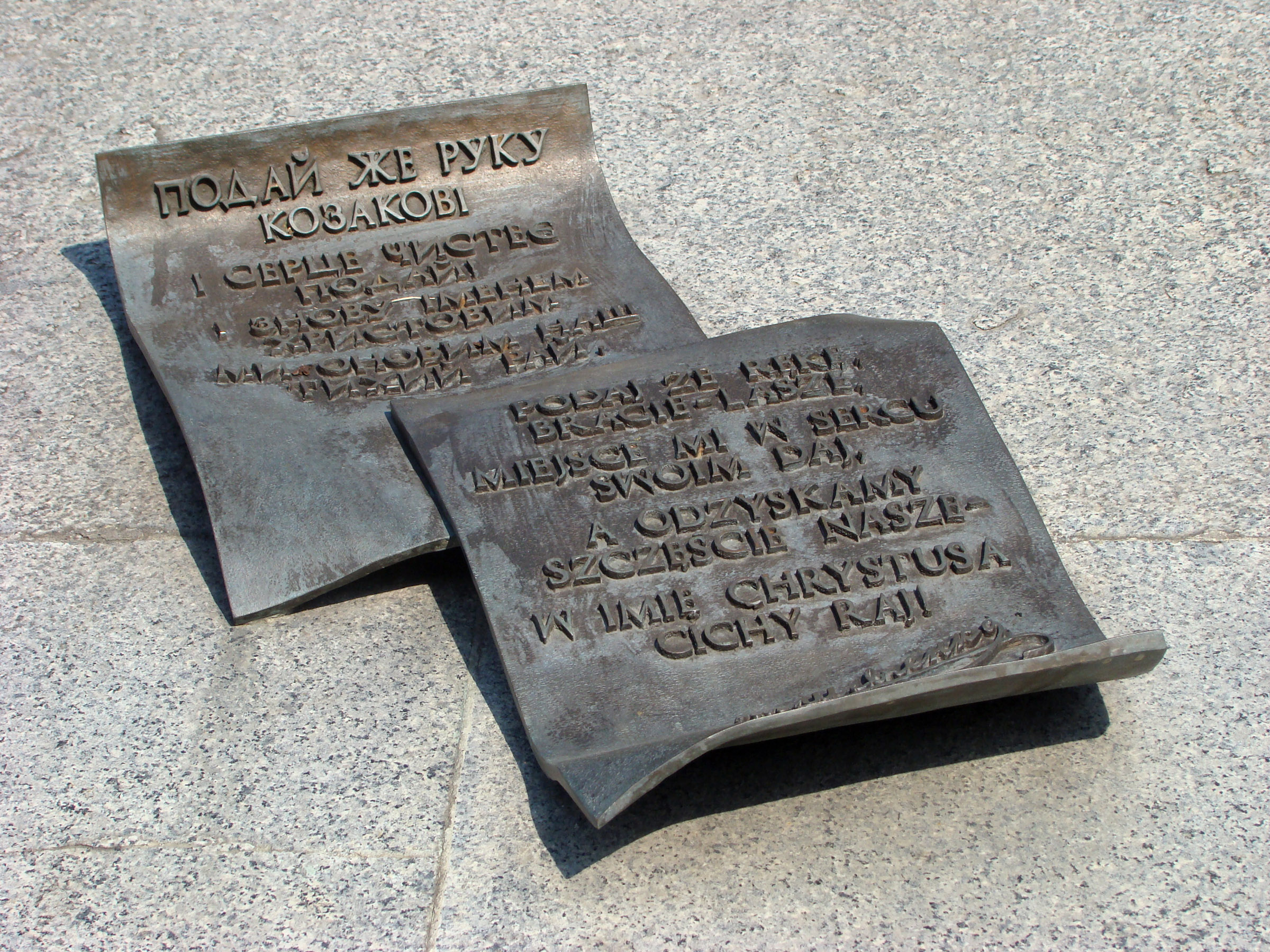
The inscription with Shevchenko's poem To the Poles, written in Polish and Ukrainian.
