= Maksymilian Fajans =

Polish artist and photographer (1825–1890)

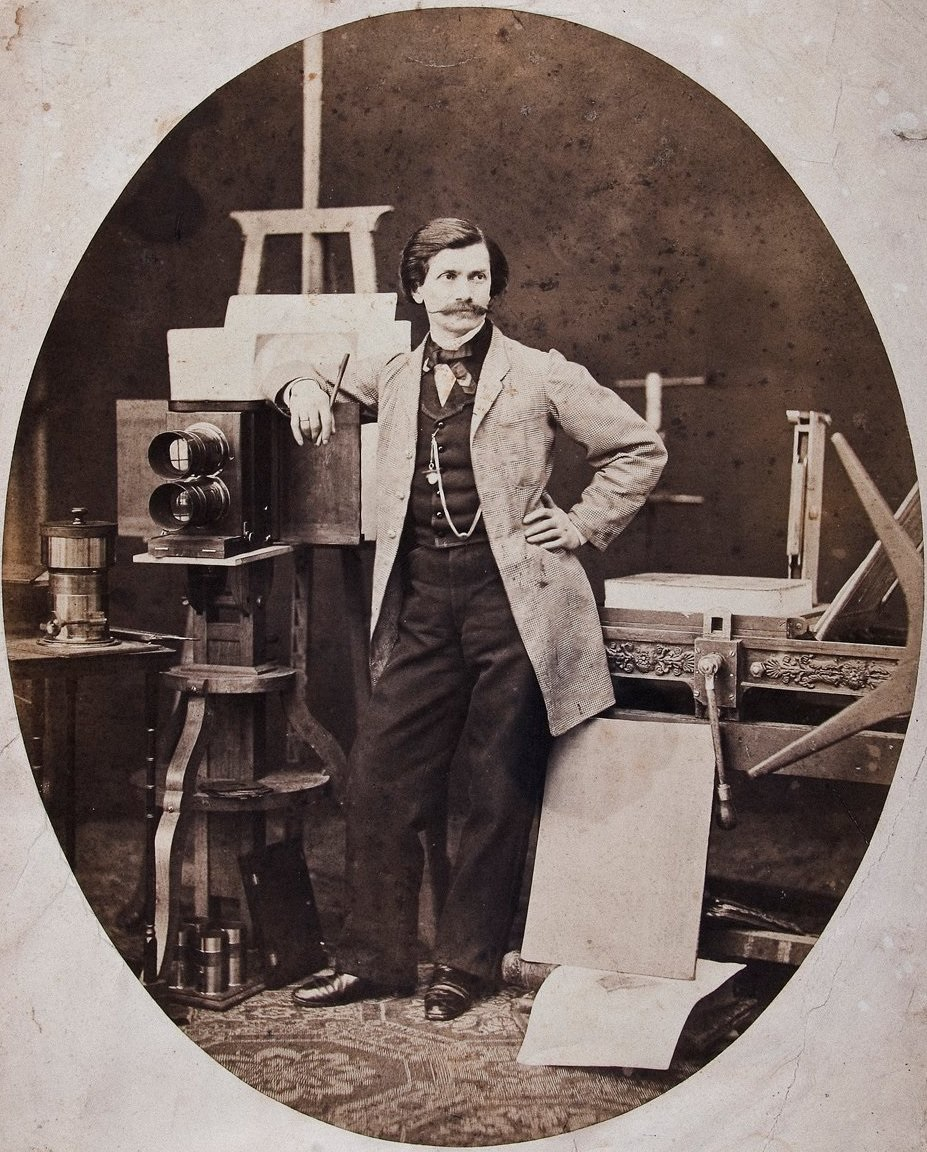
- Self-portrait in the artist's workshop c. 1850
- Born: May 5, 1825; Sieradz, Congress Poland
- Died: July 28, 1890 (aged 65); Warsaw, Congress Poland
- Resting place: Jewish Cemetery, Warsaw
- Spouses: Paulina Lindau (1836–1857); Mina Gerstenzweig (1841–1933)
- Children: 1
- Parents: Herman (father); Leontyna née Kon (mother)

Maksymilian Fajans (May 5, 1825 in Sieradz – July 28, 1890 in Warsaw) was a Polish artist, lithographer and photographer. Fajans won several prizes at the International Photographic Exhibition organized in 1865 in Berlin and, in 1873, at the Vienna Exhibition.

== Life ==
Fajans was born in Sieradz to Jewish parents and studied at Warsaw's School of Fine Arts (Szkoła Sztuk Pięknych) in 1844–49, and between 1850 and 1853 he worked and stationed in Paris, where he was a pupil of the Dutch–French painter Ary Scheffer. His younger brother was the shipowner Maurycy Fajans.

Fajans established one of the first photography studios in Warsaw. In 1851–63 he published 14 folios of Wizerunki polskie (Polish Images) after his own drawings, and in 1851–61, 24 folios of Wzory sztuki średniowiecznej (Images of Medieval Art) after drawings by L. Łepkowski, B. Podczaszyński and others.

In chromolithography he published Kwiaty i poezje (Flowers and Poems, 1858, after his own drawings), illustrations for albums and books (Karola X. Gustawa króla szwedzkiego trofea...—Swedish King Carl Gustav's Trophies...—by E. Tyszkiewicz, 1856; Album widoków Polski—Album of Polish Views—by N. Orda, 1875–83). He also collaborated with the publisher, Samuel Orgelbrand. In addition, he worked in utilitarian graphics (calendars, diplomas).

== Portraits ==
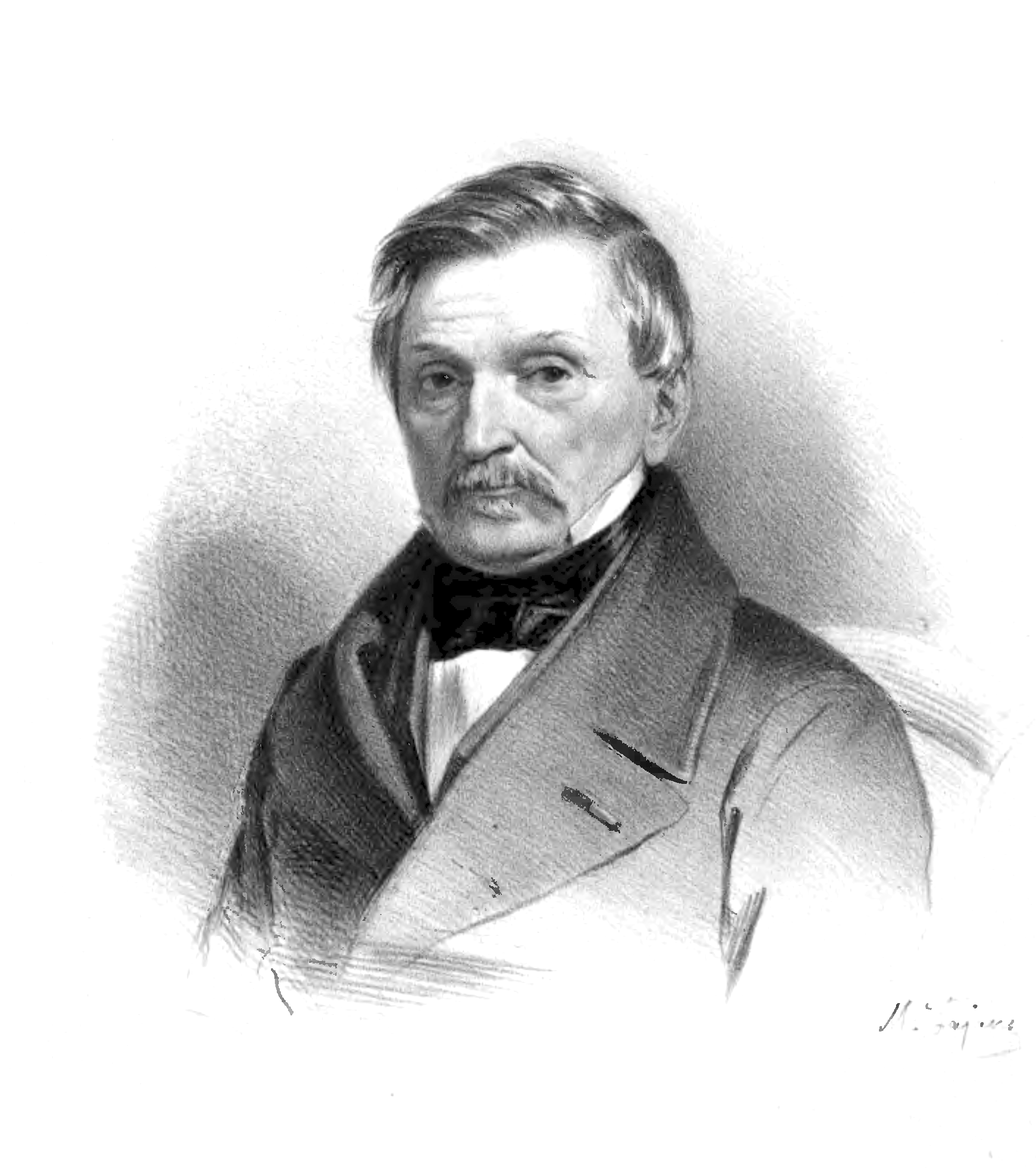
Aleksander Fredro

Fajans's portraits of notable contemporaries included:

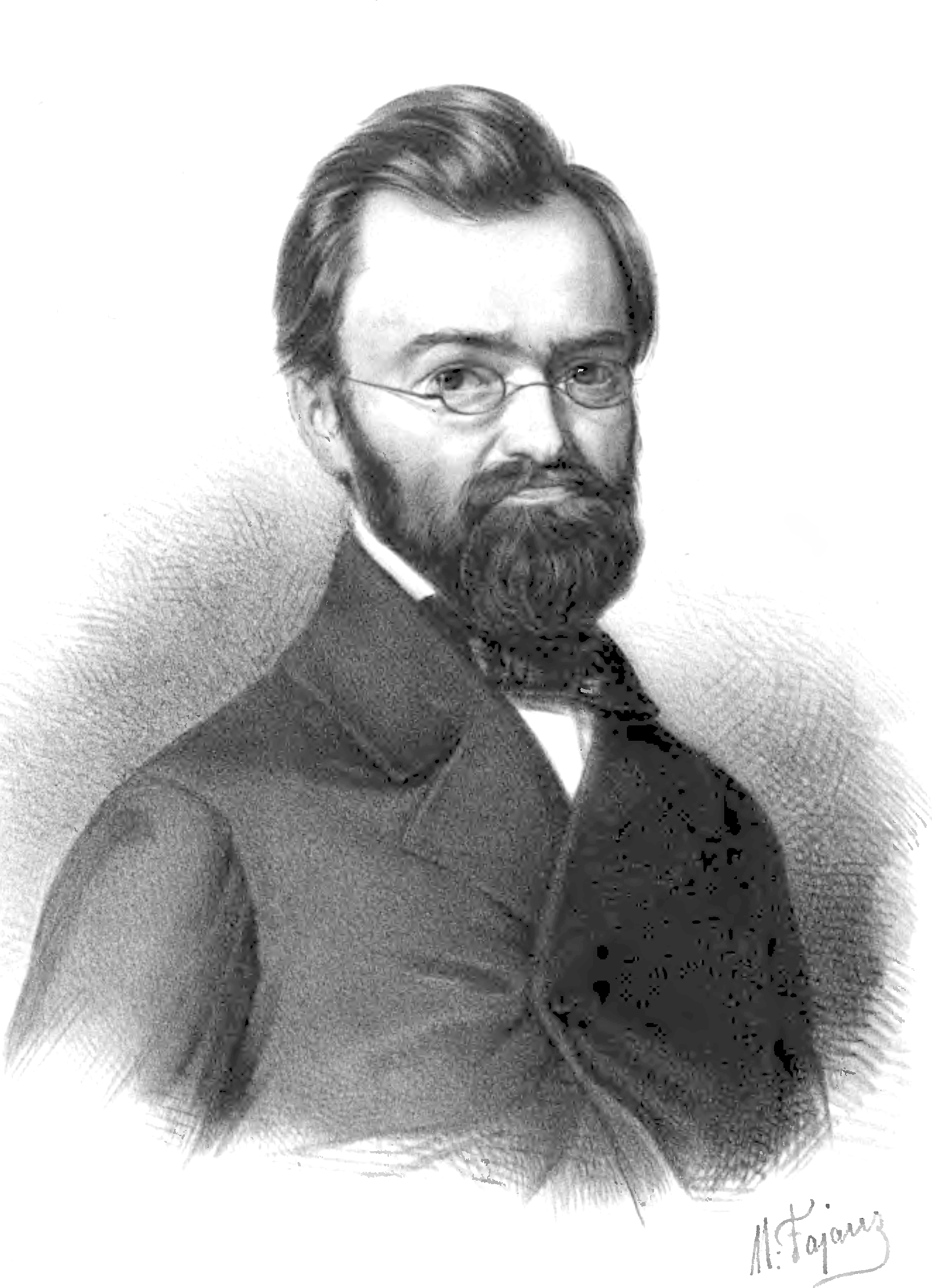
August Cieszkowski

- Aleksander Fredro
- Andrzej Artur Zamoyski
- Antoni Edward Odyniec
- August Cieszkowski
- Antoni Melchior Fijałkowski
- Ignacy Feliks Dobrzyński
- January Suchodolski
- Józef Bohdan Zaleski
- Józef Elsner
- Karol Libelt
- Karol Lipiński
- Lucjan Siemieński
- Teodor Narbutt
- Józef Kremer
