= Ukrainian school =

Group of 19th century poets

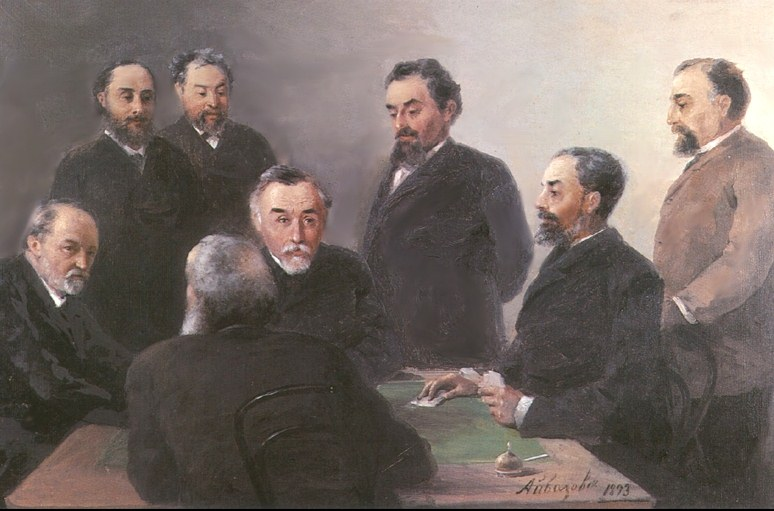
Self portrait of Iwan Ajwazowski with a group of friends

In Polish poetry, the Ukrainian school were a group of Romantic poets of the early 19th century who hailed from the southeastern fringes of the Polish-inhabited lands of the time (this period followed the partition of the Polish–Lithuanian Commonwealth; today mostly part of Ukraine). The poets—Antoni Malczewski, Józef Bohdan Zaleski, Tomasz Padura, Aleksander Groza and Seweryn Goszczyński—produced a distinct style of Polish Romanticism through the incorporation of Ukrainian life, landscapes, history, political events, and folklore into their works. They in turn influenced both Lithuanian and Ukrainian Romantic poetry, and, along with other Polish poets, constituted a link between the various literatures of the post-partition Commonwealth.
