= Tymko Padura =

Polish and Ukrainian musician and poet

- Тимко Падура
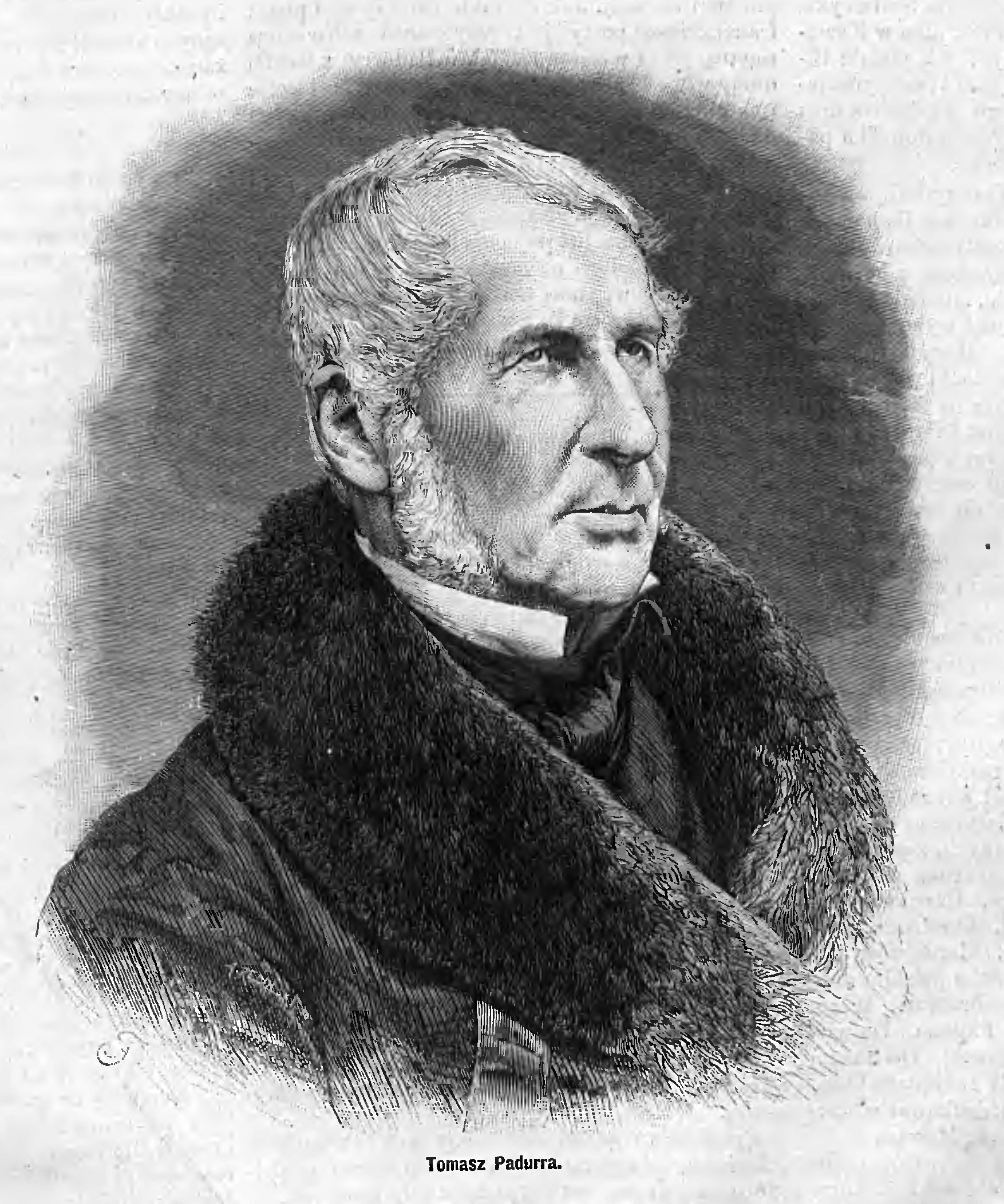
- Born: Tomasz Padura; 21 December 1801; Illintsi, Kiev Governorate, Russian Empire (present-day Ukraine)
- Died: 20 September 1871 (aged 69); Koziatyn, Kiev Governorate, Russian Empire (present-day Ukraine)
- Occupations: Poet; Torbanist; Composer; Songwriter

Family heraldry (Sas)

Tymko Padura (Note: Ukrainian: Тимко Падура, romanized: Tymko Padura; Polish: Tomasz Padura; Russian: Фома Падура, romanized: Foma Padura; Sometimes given as Padurra) (21 December 1801 – 20 September 1871, born Tomasz) was a Romantic poet of the Ukrainian school, musician-torbanist, and composer-songwriter.

Padura's ballad of Ustym Karmaliuk "Beyond Siberia The Sun Rises" ("За Сибіром cонце cходить") achieved extraordinary popularity in 19th century Ukraine. It became a folk-song. He may also have written the song "Hej Sokoły", which is very popular in both Ukraine and Poland.

He was born in Illintsi and died in Koziatyn (then in the Russian Empire, now in Ukraine). He participated in the November Uprising.
