= Hej Sokoły =

Polish-Ukrainian folk song

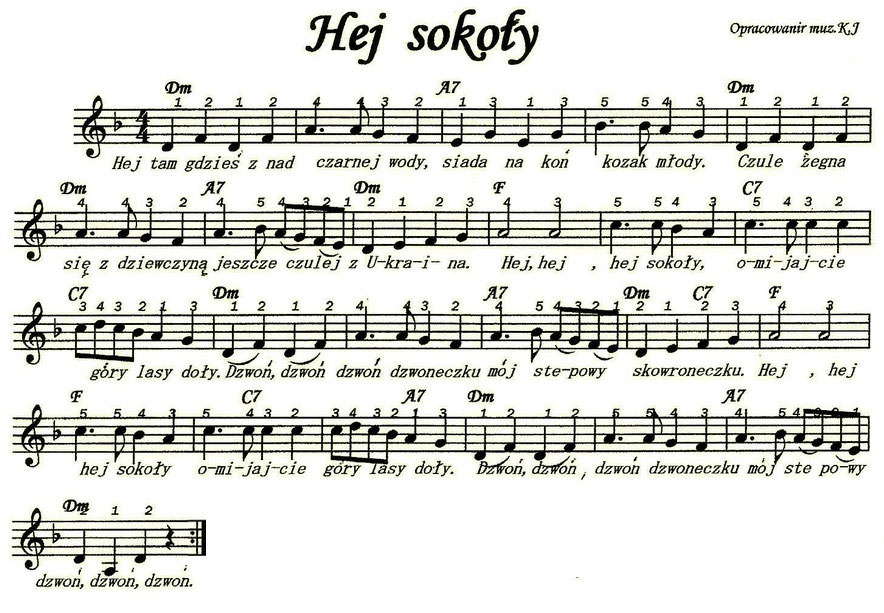
Sheet music with original Polish textMIDI version

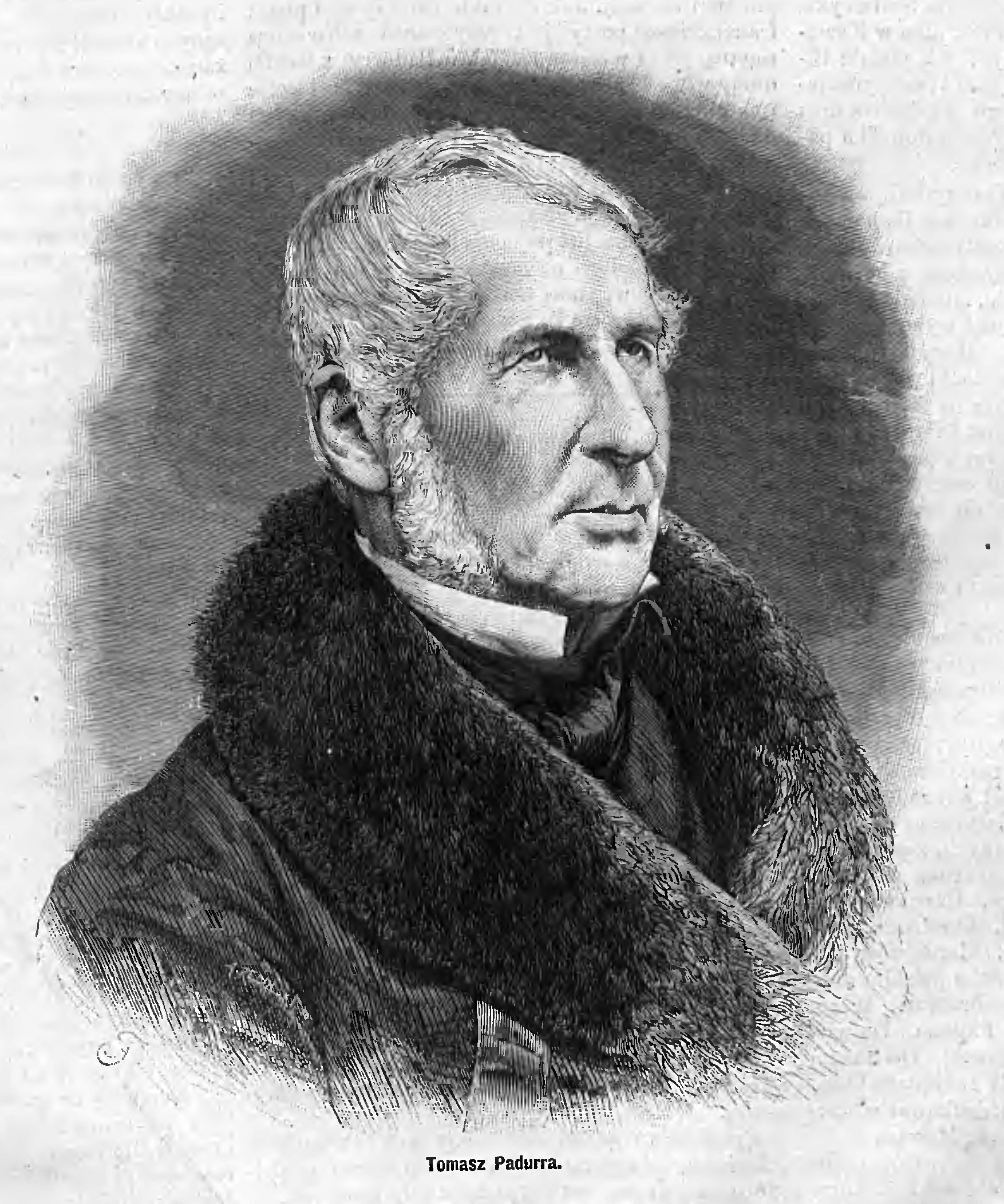
Tomasz Padura (1801–1871), one of the composers believed to be the author of the song

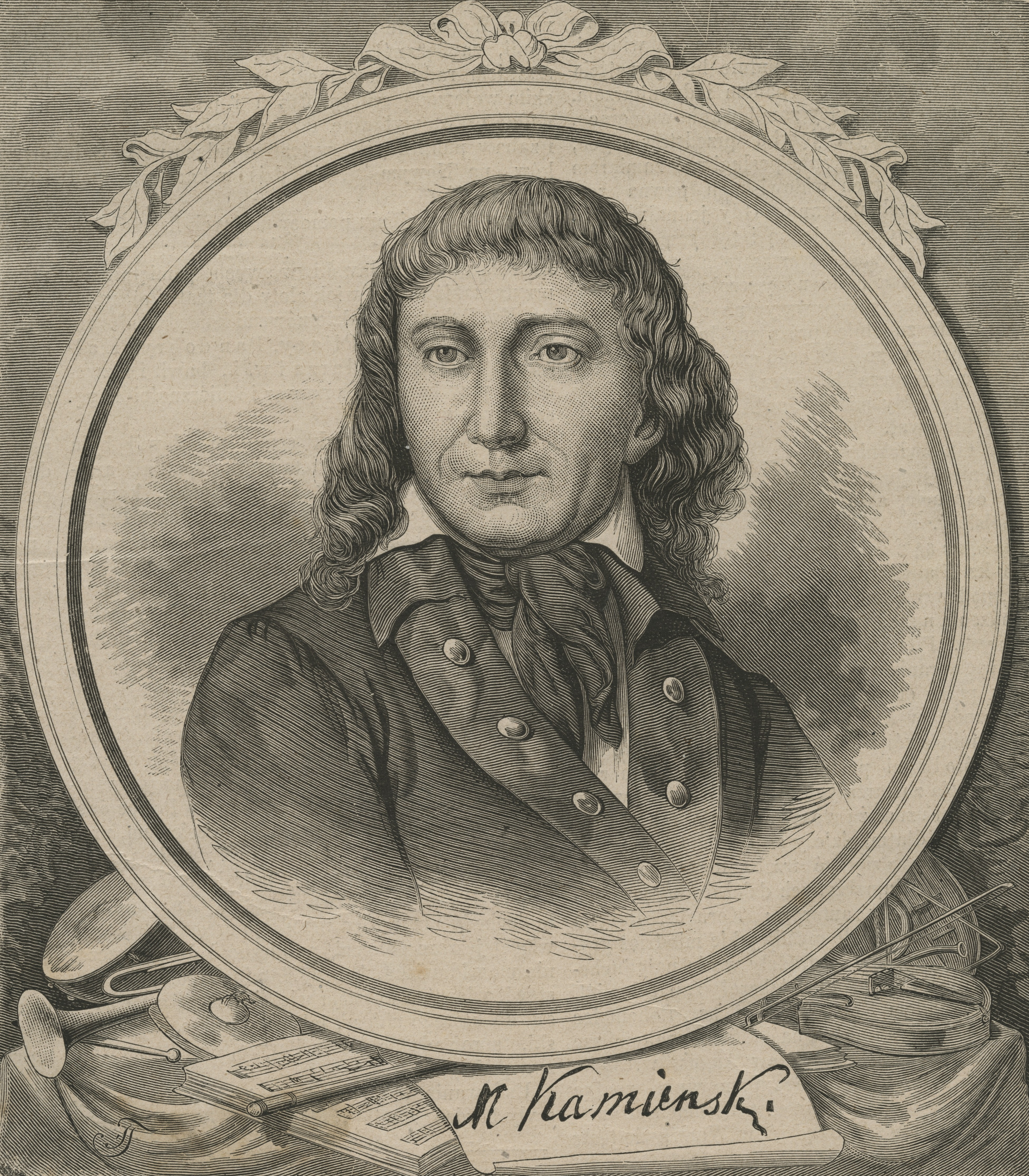
Maciej Kamieński (1734–1821), one of the composers believed to be the author of the song

"Hej Sokoły" (Polish for "Hey, Falcons", Ukrainian: Гей, соколи, romanized: Hei, sokoly) is a Polish and Ukrainian folk song.

== History ==
The song's authorship is not completely certain. Some historians attribute the writing of the song to the Ukrainian-Polish poet-songwriter Tomasz Padura (1801–1871); however, according to the latest Ukrainian research, there are no lyrics of the song in any of Padura's song collections. Others believe it was written by the Polish classical composer Maciej Kamieński (1734–1825). The original Polish-language version was translated (sometimes with modified lyrics) into several languages.

According to Olga Kharchyshyn, "Hej Sokoły" is based on the 19th century Polish folk song "Żal za Ukrainą", but with a new refrain and opening verses. It first appeared in the current form in the latter half of the 20th century and was subsequently translated from the Polish language into Ukrainian.

== Popularity ==
The tune was popular among Polish soldiers during the Polish–Soviet War, and was also sung by the Polish Home Army guerrillas during World War II. Polish folk singer Maryla Rodowicz performed a cover of the song. The song is widely known in the countries: Poland, Ukraine, Slovakia, and Belarus, and to a lesser extent in Russia and the eastern Czech Republic.

It is sometimes presented as a Polish folk song and/or Ukrainian folk song. The lyrics vary only slightly between the two languages.

== Lyrics ==
The lyrics exist in several versions about a Ukrainian girl to whom her betrothed (a cossack or an uhlan) says goodbye for the last time.

Polish
Hej, tam gdzieś z nad czarnej wody
Wsiada na koń kozak (Note: or ułan) młody.
Czule żegna się z dziewczyną,
Jeszcze czulej z Ukrainą.
Refrain:
Hej, hej, hej sokoły!
Omijajcie góry, lasy, doły. (Note: or Omijajcie góry, lasy, pola, doły)
Dzwoń, dzwoń, dzwoń dzwoneczku,
Mój stepowy skowroneczku.

Wiele dziewcząt jest na świecie,
Lecz najwięcej (Note: or najpiękniejsze) w Ukrainie.
Tam me serce pozostało,
Przy kochanej mej dziewczynie.
Refrain

Ona biedna tam została,
Jaskółeczka (Note: or Przepióreczka or Zazuleńka (kukułeczka)) moja mała,
A ja tutaj w obcej stronie
Dniem i nocą tęsknię do niej.
Refrain

Żal, żal, za dziewczyną,
Za zieloną Ukrainą,
Żal, żal, serce płacze,
Już jej więcej nie zobaczę.
Refrain

Wina, wina, wina dajcie!
A jak umrę pochowajcie
Na zielonej Ukrainie
Przy kochanej mej dziewczynie.
Refrain

Hey, there, somewhere near black waters, (Note: in meaning: the Black Sea)
A young cossack (Note: or uhlan) mounts his horse.
Sadly he parts with his girl,
But even more sadly with Ukraine.
Refrain:
Hey, hey, hey falcons!
Fly past the mountains, forests, valleys. (Note: or Fly past the mountains, forests, fields and valleys)
Ring, ring, ring little bell.
My little steppe skylark.

There are many girls in the world,
But the most (Note: or but the most beautiful) in Ukraine.
There, I left my heart
With my beloved girl.
Refrain

She, poor one, remained there,
My little swallow, (Note: or quail or cuckoo)
And I'm here in this foreign land (Note: lit. 'on the foreign side')
I miss her day and night.
Refrain

Sorrow, sorrow, for that girl,
And for green Ukraine;
Sorrow, sorrow, heart is stricken,
I'll never see her again.
Refrain

Wine, wine, give me wine!
And when I die bury me
In green Ukraine,
By my dear girl.
Refrain

Ukrainian
Гей, десь там, де чорні води,
Сів на коня козак молодий.
Плаче молода дівчина,
Їде козак з України.
Refrain:
Гей! Гей! Гей, соколи!
Оминайте гори, ліси, доли.
Дзвін, дзвін, дзвін, дзвіночку,
Степовий жайвороночку.

У світі є багато дівчат,
Але найбільше в Україні.
Там моє серце залишилося,
При моїй коханій дівчині.
Refrain

Плаче, плаче, дівчинонька,
Люба моя ластівонька,
А я у чужому краю,
Серце спокою не має.
Refrain

Жаль, жаль, за милою,
За рідною стороною.
Жаль, жаль серце плаче,
Більше її не побачу.
Refrain

Меду, вина наливайте
Як загину поховайте
На далекій Україні
Коло милої дівчини.
Refrain

Transliteration
Hei, des tam de chorni vody,
Siv na konia kozak molodyi.
Plache moloda divchyna,
Ide kozak z Ukrainy.
Refrain:
Hei! Hei! Hei, sokoly!
Omynaite hory, lisy, doly.
Dzvin, Dzvin, Dzvin, dzvinochku,
Stepovyi zhaivoronochku.

U sviti ye bahato divchat,
Ale naibilshe v Ukraini.
Tam moie sertse zalyshylosia,
Pry moii kohanii divchyni.
Refrain

Plache, plache, divchynonka,
Liuba moia lastivonka,
A ya u chuzhomu kraiu,
Sertse spokoiu ne maie.
Refrain

Zhal, zhal za myloiu,
Za ridnoiu storonoiu.
Zhal, zhal sertse plache,
Bilshe ii ne pobachu.
Refrain

Medu, vyna nalyvaite
Yak zahynu pokhovaite
Na dalekii Ukraini
Kolo myloi divchyny.
Refrain

== Usage during the Russian invasion of Ukraine ==
A number of social media videos put out by Ukrainian forces to celebrate victories in the Russian invasion of Ukraine feature the song as the backing track. On 16 April 2022, the General Staff of the Armed Forces of Ukraine put out a video with a version of the song recorded by the group Pikkardiyska Tertsiya as a show of gratitude towards the military aid from Poland.

On 23 March 2023, the Slovak Armed Forces uploaded a video on YouTube showing the transfer of four MiG-29 fighter jets to Ukraine, featuring a version of the song recorded by the Military Music Band of the Armed Forces of the Slovak Republic.
