= Romanticism in Poland =

Polish sociocultural movement (c. 1820 - 1864)

Romanticism in Poland, a literary, artistic and intellectual period in the evolution of Polish culture, began around 1820, coinciding with the publication of Adam Mickiewicz's first poems in 1822. It ended with the suppression of the January 1863 Uprising against the Russian Empire in 1864. The latter event ushered in a new era in Polish culture known as Positivism.

Polish Romanticism, unlike Romanticism in some other parts of Europe, was not limited to literary and artistic concerns. Due to specific Polish historical circumstances, notably the partitions of Poland, it was also an ideological, philosophical, and political movement that expressed the ideals and way of life of a Polish society subjected to foreign rule and to ethnic and religious discrimination.

== History ==
Polish Romanticism had two distinct periods in terms of its literary forms: 1820–1832, and 1832–1864. In the first period, Polish Romantics were strongly influenced by other European Romantics. Their art featured emotionalism and irrationality, fantasy and imagination, personality cults, folklore and country life, and the propagation of ideals of freedom. The most famous writers of the period were Adam Mickiewicz, Seweryn Goszczyński, Tomasz Zan and Maurycy Mochnacki.

In the second period, many of the Polish Romantics worked abroad, often banished from Poland by the occupying powers due to their politically subversive ideas. Their work became increasingly dominated by the ideals of political struggle for freedom and their country's sovereignty. Elements of mysticism became more prominent. There developed the idea of the poeta wieszcz (the prophet). The wieszcz (bard) functioned as spiritual leader to the nation fighting for its independence. The most notable poet so recognized was Adam Mickiewicz. His famous verse epic Pan Tadeusz describes his love for the partitioned homeland and people of his native country:

"O Lithuania, my country, thou
Art like good health; I never knew till now
How precious, till I lost thee. Now I see
Thy beauty whole, because I yearn for thee."

(— Opening stanza of Pan Tadeusz, Kenneth R. Mackenzie translation)

Other notable Polish Romantic writers active abroad included Juliusz Słowacki, Zygmunt Krasiński, and Cyprian Kamil Norwid. A number of Romantics remained active in divided and occupied Poland, including Józef Ignacy Kraszewski, Wincenty Pol, Władysław Syrokomla, and Narcyza Żmichowska. One of Polish Romanticism's unique qualities was its relation to and inspiration from Polish history from before the invasion. Polish Romanticism revived the old "Sarmatic" traditions of Polish nobility, the szlachta. Old traditions and customs were portrayed favourably in the Polish messianic movement and in the leading works of virtually all Polish national poets, most notably in Pan Tadeusz, but also in the epic works of prose writers including Henryk Sienkiewicz's Trylogia. This close connection between Polish Romanticism and the past became one of the defining qualities of the literature of Polish Romantic period, differentiating it from that of other countries who did not suffer the loss of statehood as was the case with Poland.

Romantic ideas informed not only literature but also painting and music. Polish Romantic painting is exemplified in the work of Artur Grottger, Henryk Rodakowski, or the equestrian master artist Piotr Michałowski (now at Sukiennice), and Jan Nepomucen Głowacki considered the father of Polish school of landscape painting, as well as the renowned historical painter Leopold Loeffler invited to Kraków by Matejko to teach the future luminaries of the Young Poland movement including Wyspiański, Tetmajer, Malczewski and Weiss among others. The music of Frédéric Chopin and Stanisław Moniuszko inspired the development of Polish Romantic movement in all fields of creative expression.

=== Notable Polish Romantic writers and poets ===
- Feliks Bernatowicz (1786–1836)
- Ryszard Berwiński (1819–1879)
- Stanisław Bogusławski (?–d. 1870)
- Kazimierz Brodziński (1791–1835)
- Antoni Czajkowski (1816–1873)
- Michał Czajkowski (1804–1886)
- Adam Jerzy Czartoryski (1770–1861)
- Jan Czeczot (1796–1846)
- Franciszek Salezy Dmochowski (1801–1871)
- Gustaw Ehrenberg (1818–1895)
- Aleksander Fredro (1791–1876)
- Antoni Gorecki (1787–1861)
- Seweryn Goszczyński (1801–1876)
- Klementyna Hoffmanowa (1798–1845)
- Teodor Tomasz Jeż (Zygmunt Miłkowski, 1824–1915)
- Kajetan Koźmian (1771–1856)
- Zygmunt Krasiński (1812–1859)
- Józef Ignacy Kraszewski (1812–1887)
- Teofil Lenartowicz (1822–1893)
- Jadwiga Łuszczewska (1834–1908)
- Antoni Malczewski (1793–1826)
- Adam Mickiewicz (1798–1855)
- Maurycy Mochnacki (1803–1834)
- Cyprian Kamil Norwid (1821–1883)
- Wincenty Pol (1807–1882)
- Mieczysław Romanowski (1834–1863)
- Henryk Rzewuski (1791–1866)
- Lucjan Siemieński (1807–1877)
- Juliusz Słowacki (1809–1849)
- Władysław Syrokomla (1823–1862)
- Kornel Ujejski (1823–1897)
- Maria Wirtemberska (1768–1854)
- Józef Bohdan Zaleski (1802–86)
- Tomasz Zan (1796–1855)
- Narcyza Żmichowska (1819–1876)

=== Other notable figures ===
- Aleksander Borkowski Dunin (1811–1896)
- Józef Borkowski Dunin (1809–1843)
- Frédéric Chopin (1810–1849), composer
- Edward Dembowski (1822–1846), philosopher, journalist and activist
- Piotr Michałowski (1800–1855), painter
- Stanisław Moniuszko (1819–1872), composer
- Stanisław Kostka Potocki (1755–1821), art patron, philosopher and intellectual
- Andrzej Towiański (1799–1878), philosopher and Messianist religious leader
- Kazimierz Władysław Wójcicki (1807–1879)

== See also ==
- History of philosophy in Poland: Polish Messianism
- Ukrainian school
- Christ of Europe
