= Igor Hałagida =

Polish scientist

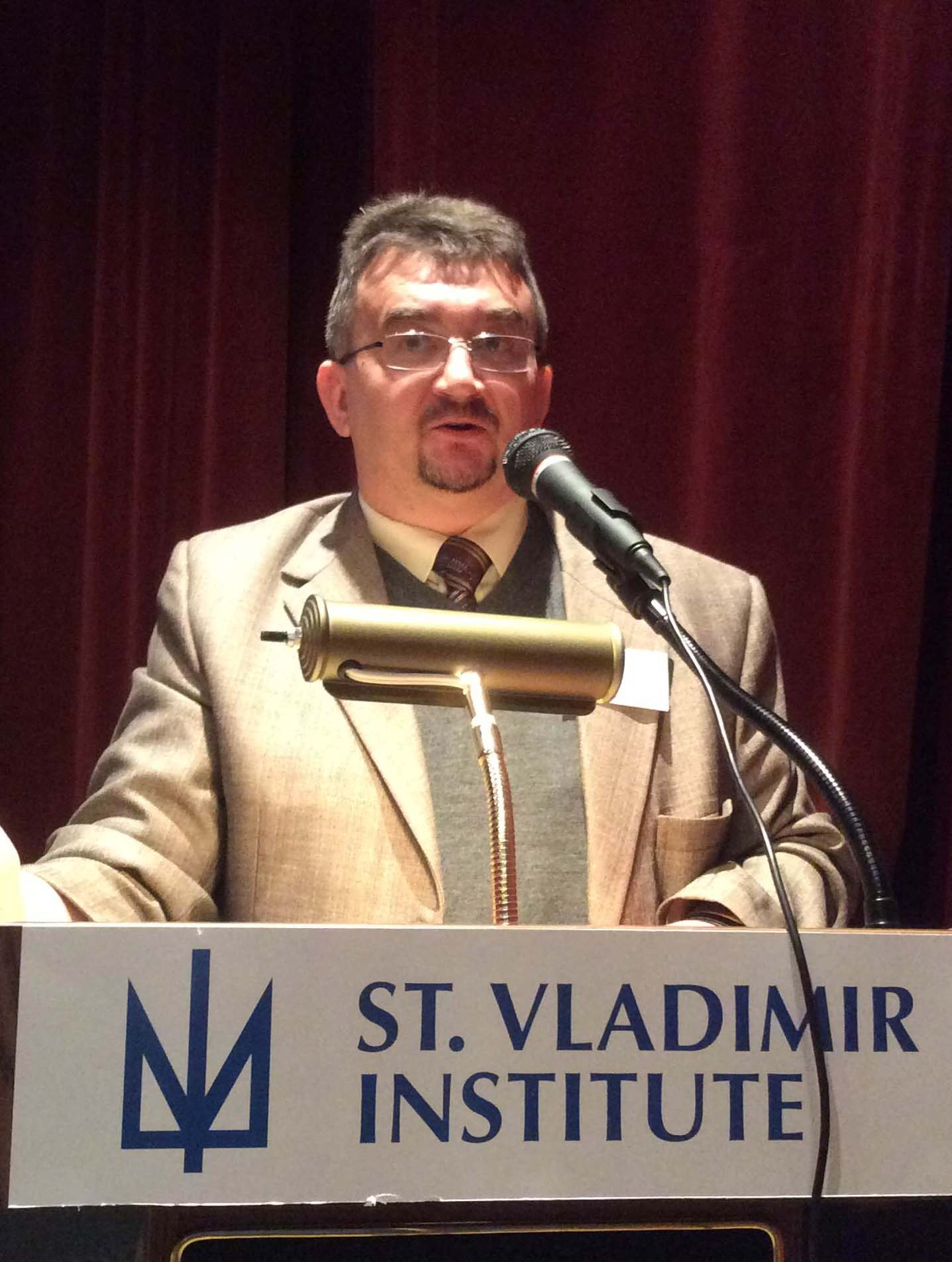
- Born: July 26, 1971 (age 55); Gołdap, Poland
- Citizenship: Poland
- Awards
- Scientific career
- Fields: History

Igor Hałagida (born July 26, 1971) is a Polish historian of Ukrainian descent, a researcher at the Polish Institute of National Remembrance in Gdańsk, and a professor at the Faculty of History of the University of Gdańsk.

== Biography ==
He graduated from the IV comprehensive lyceum with the Ukrainian language of instruction in the city of Legnica. He graduated from the History Department of the University of Gdańsk in 1996, where he also received a PhD (2000) and a habilitated PhD (2009). His work is mainly devoted to the Ukrainian minority in Poland and Polish-Ukrainian relations.

Activist of the Association of Ukrainians in Poland.

On September 25, 2008, he was awarded the Memoria iustorum award for his contribution to the development of the Polish-Ukrainian dialogue. On June 16, 2015, he was awarded the Golden Cross of Merit.

== Selected publications ==
- Igor Hałagida (red.), W starej i nowej ojczyźnie. Mniejszości narodowe w Gdańsku po II wojnie światowej, Gdańsk 1997.
- Drozd R., Igor Hałagida, Ukraińcy w Polsce 1944—1989. Walka o tożsamość (Dokumenty i materiały), Warszawa 1999.
- Igor Hałagida, Ukraińcy na Zachodnich i północnych ziemiach Polskich 1947—1957, Warszawa 2002 (rozprawa doktorska).
- Igor Hałagida (red.), System represji stalinowskich w Polsce 1944—1956. Represje w marynarce wojennej, Gdańsk 2005.
- Igor Hałagida, Prowokacja «Zenona».Geneza, przebieg i skutki operacji MBP o kryptonimie «C-1» przeciwko banderowskiej frakcji OUN i wywiadowi brytyjskiemu (1950—1954), Warszawa 2005.
- Igor Hałagida, «Szpieg Watykanu». Kapłan greckokatolicki ks. Bazyli Hrynyk (1896—1977), Warszawa 2008.
- Igor Hałagida, NSZZ «Solidarność» Regionu Słupskiego (19801990). t. 1: szkice do monografii, Gdańsk 2010.
- Igor Hałagida, Odnowienie duszpasterstwa greckokatolickiego w Polsce 1956—1957. Dokumenty, Warszawa 2011 («Bazyliańskie Studia Historyczne», t. 1).
- Igor Hałagida (red.), «Trzynastego grudnia roku pamiętnego…». Internowani w stanie wojennym z powodów politycznych z województw bydgoskiego, elbląskiego, gdańskiego, słupskiego, toruńskiego i włocławskiego, Bydgoszcz-Gdańsk 2011.
- Igor Hałagida, NSZZ «Solidarność» Regionu Słupskiego (1980—1990). t. 2: dokumenty Komitetu Wojewódzkiego PZPR i Służby Bezpieczeństwa, Gdańsk 2011.
- Igor Hałagida (red.), Szkice z dziejów NSZZ «Solidarność» na Pomorzu Nadwiślańskim i Kujawach (1980—1990), Bydgoszcz-Gdańsk 2012.
- Igor Hałagida, Działania komunistycznych organów bezpieczeństwa przeciwko duchowieństwu greckokatolickiemu w Polsce (1944—1956). Dokumenty, Warszawa 2012 («Bazyliańskie Studia Historyczne», t. 2).
- Igor Hałagida, Między Moskwą, Warszawą i Watykanem. Dzieje Kościoła greckokatolickiego w Polsce w latach 1944—1970, Warszawa 2013.
