= Honour Guard of the President (Slovakia) =

Official ceremonial honor guard unit of the president of Slovakia

- Čestná stráž prezidenta Slovenskej republiky
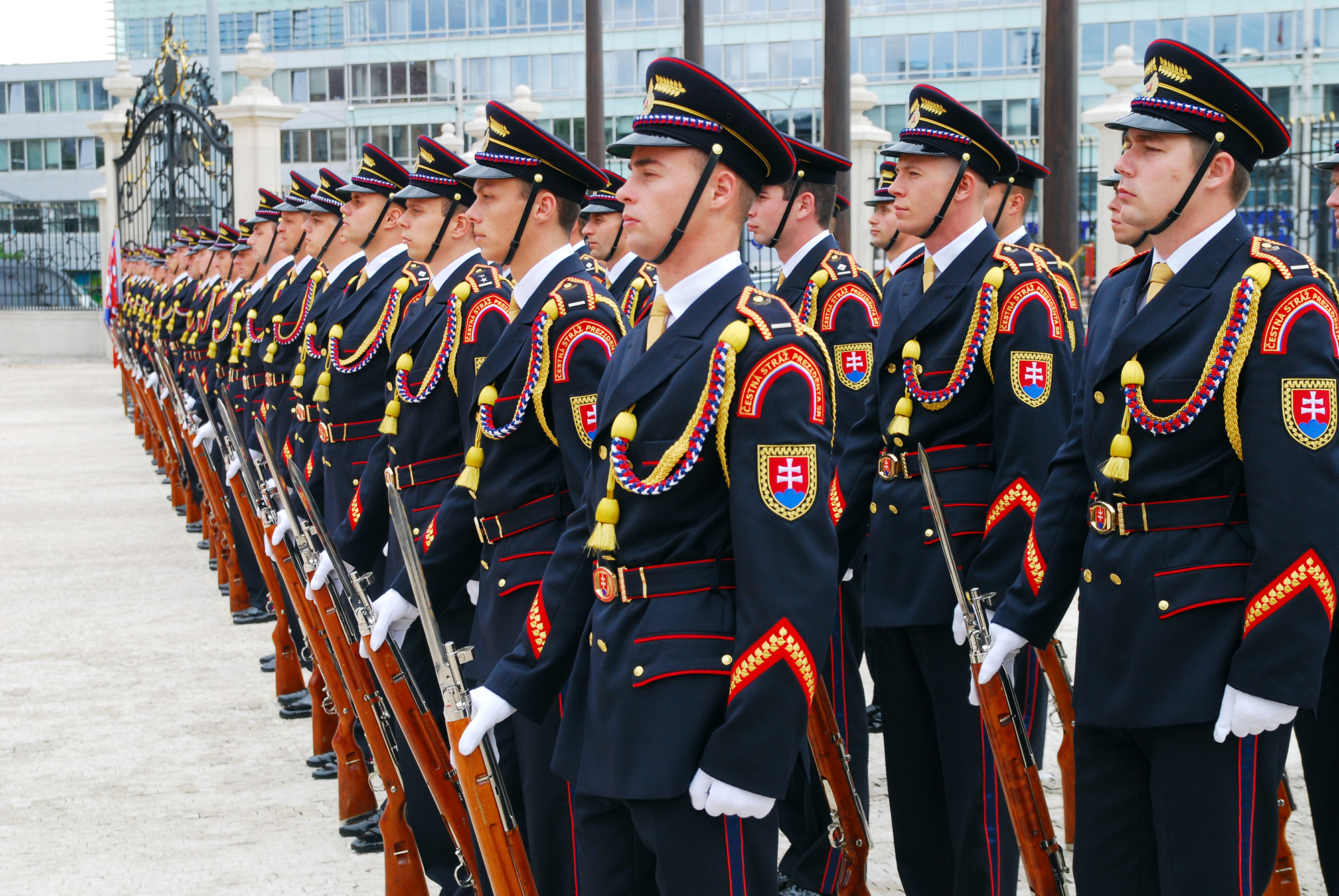
- The honour guard standing at ease during the signing ceremony of a cooperation agreement between Slovakia and Ukraine.
- Active: 1968; 58 years ago
- Country: Slovakia
- Allegiance: President of Slovakia
- Branch: Slovak Armed Forces
- Type: Honor Guard
- Role: Ceremonial Guard
- Part of: Military Office of the President of the Slovak Republic
- Headquarters: Bratislava
- Nickname: Presidential Guard

Commanders
- Current commander: Colonel Marián Mäsiar

The Honour Guard of the President is the official ceremonial honor guard unit of the president of Slovakia, under the direct command of the Military Office of the President of the Slovak Republic.

== Background ==
The first ceremonial unit, the 318th Guard Battalion, was established in Bratislava on the basis of the order of the Ministry of National Defense of Czechoslovakia on 27 October 1968. In addition to being and honor guard for the leadership of the Slovak Socialist Republic, it also performed guard services for the Communist Party of Czechoslovakia and the Government of Czechoslovakia. After the establishment of the Slovak Republic on New Years Day in 1993, the battalion was transformed into the Castle Guard Regiment, which provided a public duties detachment which would become a separate unit on 1 March 1993. The battalion was transferred to the Primate's Palace on November 24, 1993, and was moved again to the Grassalkovich Palace in September 1996, where it currently provides guard duties.

== Uniform and weapons ==
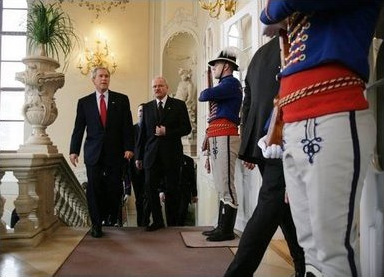
President George W. Bush and Slovak President Ivan Gašparovič walking past a guard in the battalion's ceremonial uniform during the Slovakia Summit 2005

The uniform of the company has been employed since June 2003. The uniform is based on a uniform of Slovak volunteers in the 1840s, which includes the Slovak tricolor. The uniform also features elements of Slovak folk art, such as a hat with a plume and a cord ornament. The uniform was designed by Ľubica Jarjabková and Helena Jurikovičová. Officers of the Honor Guard are armed with a 985-mm-long ceremonial sword. The blade is made of stainless steel, and has a leather-covered scabbard. Soldiers of the battalion (mostly NCOs) are for ceremonial occasions armed with a 1080 mm flintlock rifle with steel barrel and a bayonet.

== See also ==
- Military Music Band of the Armed Forces of the Slovak Republic
