= Maurycy Fajans =

Polish-Jewish merchant (1827–1897)

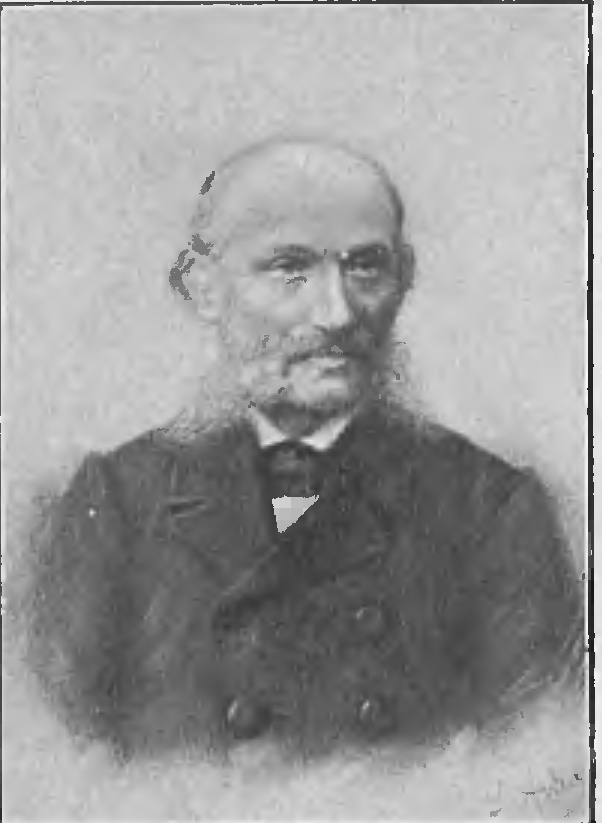
- Fajans, from a portrait published in Tygodnik Ilustrowany in 1908
- Born: 1827
- Died: 26 May 1897 (aged 69–70)
- Occupations: Merchant, shipowner
- Spouse: Maria Dawidson
- Children: 6
- Relatives: Maksymilian Fajans (brother)

Maurycy Fajans (1827 – 26 May 1897) was a Polish-Jewish merchant and shipowner. From 1871 he ran a steam navigation company on the Vistula River, working from his own shipyard at Solec in Warsaw, and the firm remained the principal carrier on the rivers of Congress Poland until the end of the 19th century.

Fajans spent his working life in Vistula navigation. He rose through the steam navigation company of Count Andrzej Artur Zamoyski. He became its director and then bought its shipyard and some of its steamers when the company was wound down after the January Uprising. Alongside the business he served as a commercial judge, sat on the committee of the Warsaw Stock Exchange and was a member of the board of the Warsaw Jewish community.

== Family ==
The Fajans family came from Sieradz and moved partly to Warsaw in the middle of the 19th century.

Maurycy was a son of Herman Fajans, a merchant and citizen of Sieradz.

His elder brother was the lithographer Maksymilian Fajans, who founded a well-known lithographic establishment in Warsaw in 1852.

He married Maria Dawidson (1836–1908). Of their six children, the three sons, Hieronim (1864–1934), Edward (1868–1930) and Jan (born 1871), all became co-owners of their father's company.

== Career ==
At the age of twenty-five Fajans became a representative of the steam navigation company of Count Andrzej Artur Zamoyski at Włocławek. At thirty-six he became its director. The company was ruined by the January Uprising and the repression that followed it. Zamoyski, its chief administrator, had to leave the country, and the company's debts grew. Fajans was in charge of it from 1866. It continued to operate until 1870 and was formally liquidated in 1871.

Most of the company's vessels went to Russian owners, but Fajans bought those that remained on the Vistula, together with twenty barges, acting in his capacity as the company's director of navigation. A modern account names three of the steamers as Wisła, Sandomierz and Narew. A report published in 1873, however, describes him as buying a few surviving steamers and repairing them, and ordering one entirely new vessel from Belgium, the Wisła, which was still awaited that May. These ships were the beginning of the Maurycy Fajans Steam Navigation Company (Towarzystwo Żeglugi Parowej Maurycego Fajansa).

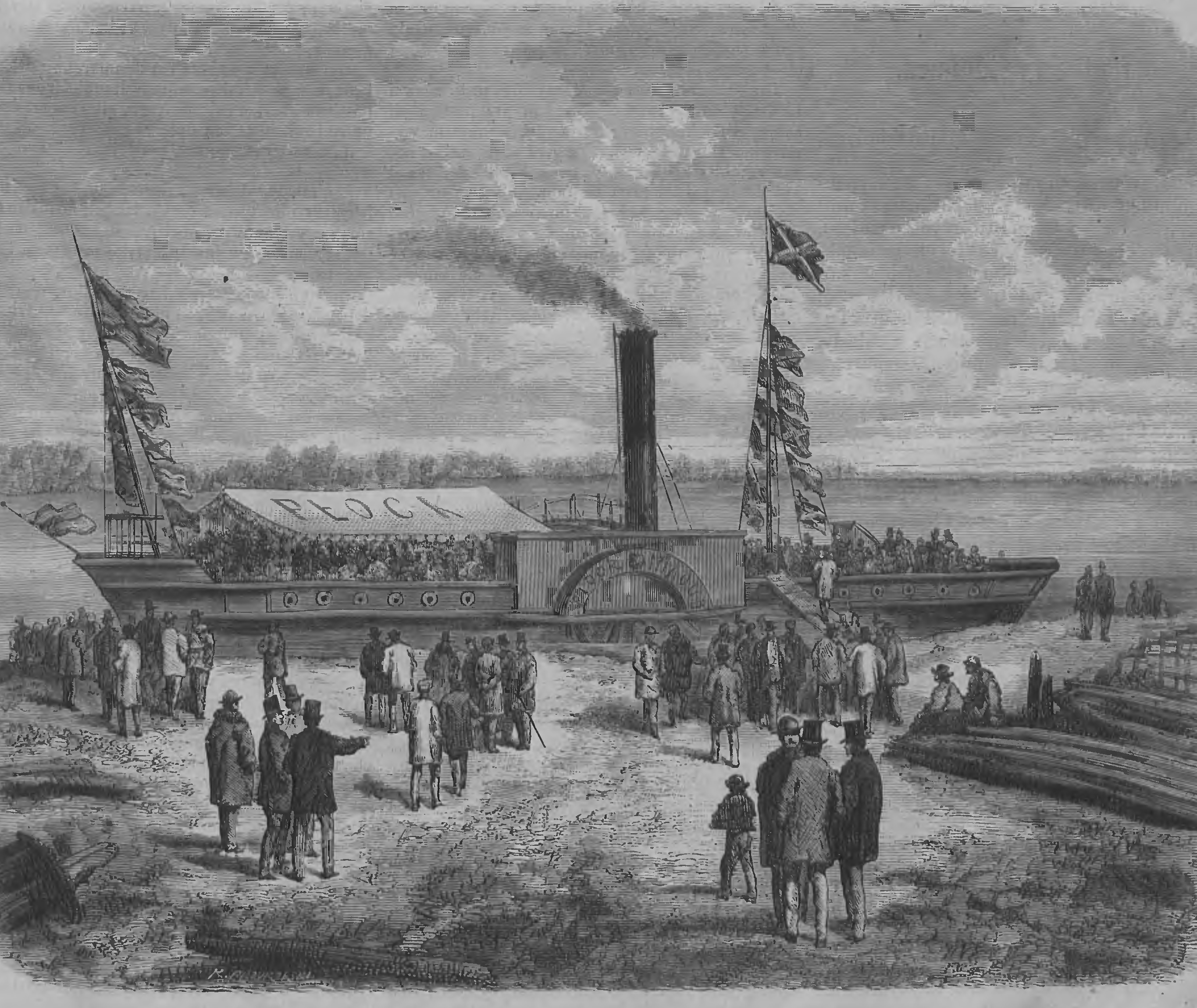
The steamer Płock landing at Wilanów in May 1873, opening that year's navigation season, drawn from life by Henryk Pillati

On the company's dissolution in 1871 he also bought its shipyard at Solec, and began running the business on his own account. By 1873 he had put a year's takings back into repairs and improvements and had the steamer Płock rebuilt, marking the new season with an excursion for invited guests down to Wilanów. He brought some further vessels from abroad, then began building his own there in order to cut costs. In 1884 he restarted shipbuilding at the works, and developed them to the point of taking orders for the military.

== Public offices ==
Fajans was a commercial judge from 1875. He sat on the committee of the Warsaw Stock Exchange between 1888 and 1894, and he was a member of the board of the Warsaw Jewish community.

== Death and the later firm ==
Fajans died on 26 May 1897, leaving the business to his sons Edward, Jan and Hieronim. He was buried at the Jewish Cemetery on Okopowa Street in Warsaw, in section 40.

Accounts of how long the firm lasted differ. Some sources have it running until the First World War, and others place its end in 1912, when it was absorbed into the Warszawskie Akcyjne Towarzystwo Handlu i Żeglugi (Warsaw Joint-Stock Trade and Navigation Company).

Edward Fajans, an engineer, stayed with the Solec yard as a designer and drew the interwar vessels Polska and Francja. The yard also built the firm's flagship Pan Tadeusz, which entered service in 1911. At 58 meters it was the largest vessel on the Vistula before the First World War.

== The 1892 poster ==
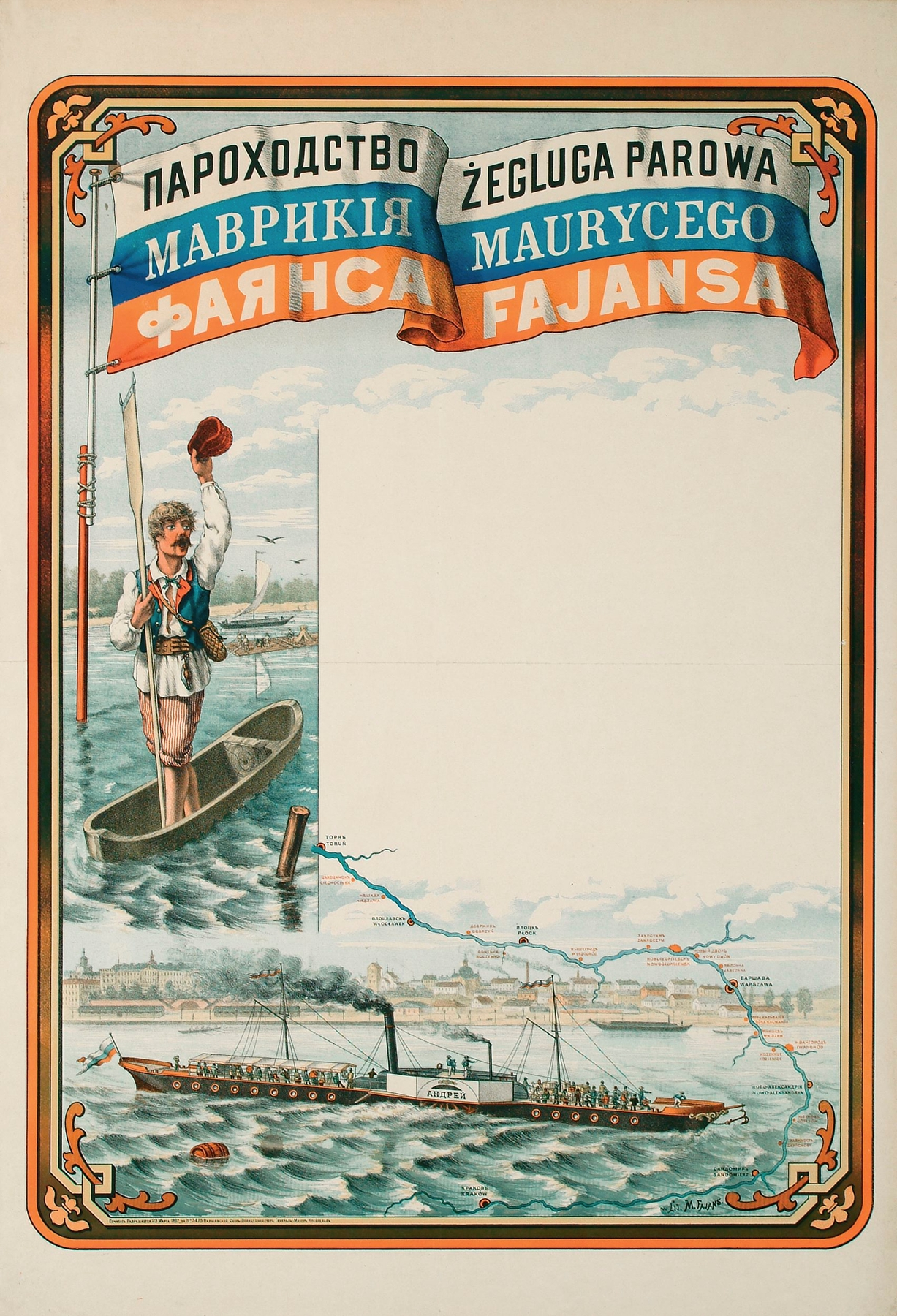
The 1892 poster advertising Fajans's steamers, printed at the lithographic firm founded by his brother Maksymilian

A color lithograph advertising the company was printed in 1892 at the lithographic firm founded by his brother Maksymilian. It shows the steamer Andrej against the panorama of Warsaw's Old Town.

It is the oldest poster in the collection of the Poster Museum at Wilanów, and is held by the National Museum in Warsaw under inventory number Pl.1054/1.
