= Illintsi Raion =

Former subdivision of Vinnytsia Oblast, Ukraine

Coordinates: 49°06′20″N 29°12′32″E

Illintsi Raion Іллінецький район
- Raion
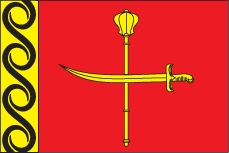
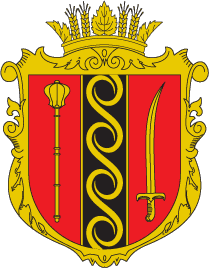
- Flag Coat of arms

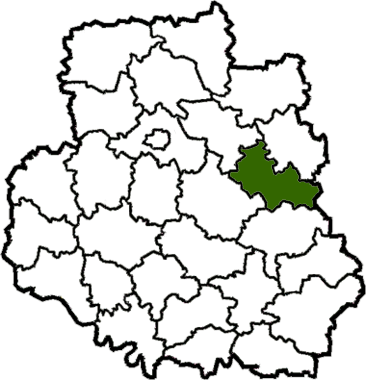
- Country: Ukraine
- Oblast: Vinnytsia Oblast
- Established: 1923
- Disestablished: 18 July 2020
- Admin. center: Illintsi
- Subdivisions: List: 1 — city councils; 1 — settlement councils; 22 — rural councils; Number of localities: 1 — cities; 1 — urban-type settlements; 47 — villages; — rural settlements

Government
  - Governor: Volodymyr Yashchuk

Area
  - Total: 910 km^{2} (350 sq mi)

Population (2020)
  - Total: 36,249 ▼
  - Density: 40/km^{2} (100/sq mi)
- Time zone: UTC+02:00 (EET)
  - Summer (DST): UTC+03:00 (EEST)
- Postal index: 22700—22756
- Area code: +380 4345
- Website: http://illrda.gov.ua

Illintsi Raion (Ukrainian: Іллінецький район) was one of raions of Vinnytsia Oblast, located in southwestern Ukraine. The administrative center of the raion was the town of Illintsi. The raion was abolished and its territory was merged into Vinnytsia Raion on 18 July 2020 as part of the administrative reform of Ukraine, which reduced the number of raions of Vinnytsia Oblast to six. The last estimate of the raion population was 36,249 (2020 est.).
