= Military Office of the President of the Slovak Republic =

Military department in the Slovak Republic

The Military Office of the President of the Slovak Republic (Slovak: Vojenská kancelária prezidenta Slovenskej republiky) is the official military department of the President of the Slovak Republic. The office's main activities is aiding the Slovakian President in his/her duties as commander in chief of the Slovak Armed Forces. It's everyday duties also include:

- Communicating military orders to the armed forces
- Advise the president on national security and local security issues
- Approves and issues the organisational rules of the military office
- Grants honorary or historic names to military units
- Grants battle flags to military units

The subordinate unit of the office is the Honour Guard of the President of the Slovak Republic which is the president's ceremonial military unit. The current Chief of the Military Office is Major General Vladimír Šimko, who attends regular sessions of the Security Council of the Slovak Republic and is accountable by the president, whoever he/she may be.

== See also ==
- President of the Slovak Republic
- Armed Forces of the Slovak Republic
- Honour Guard of the President of the Slovak Republic
- Grassalkovich Palace

== External sources ==
- President of the Slovak Republic
