= Military Music Band of the Armed Forces of the Slovak Republic =

Military Music Band of the Armed Forces of the Slovak Republic Vojenská hudba Ozbrojených síl Slovenskej republiky
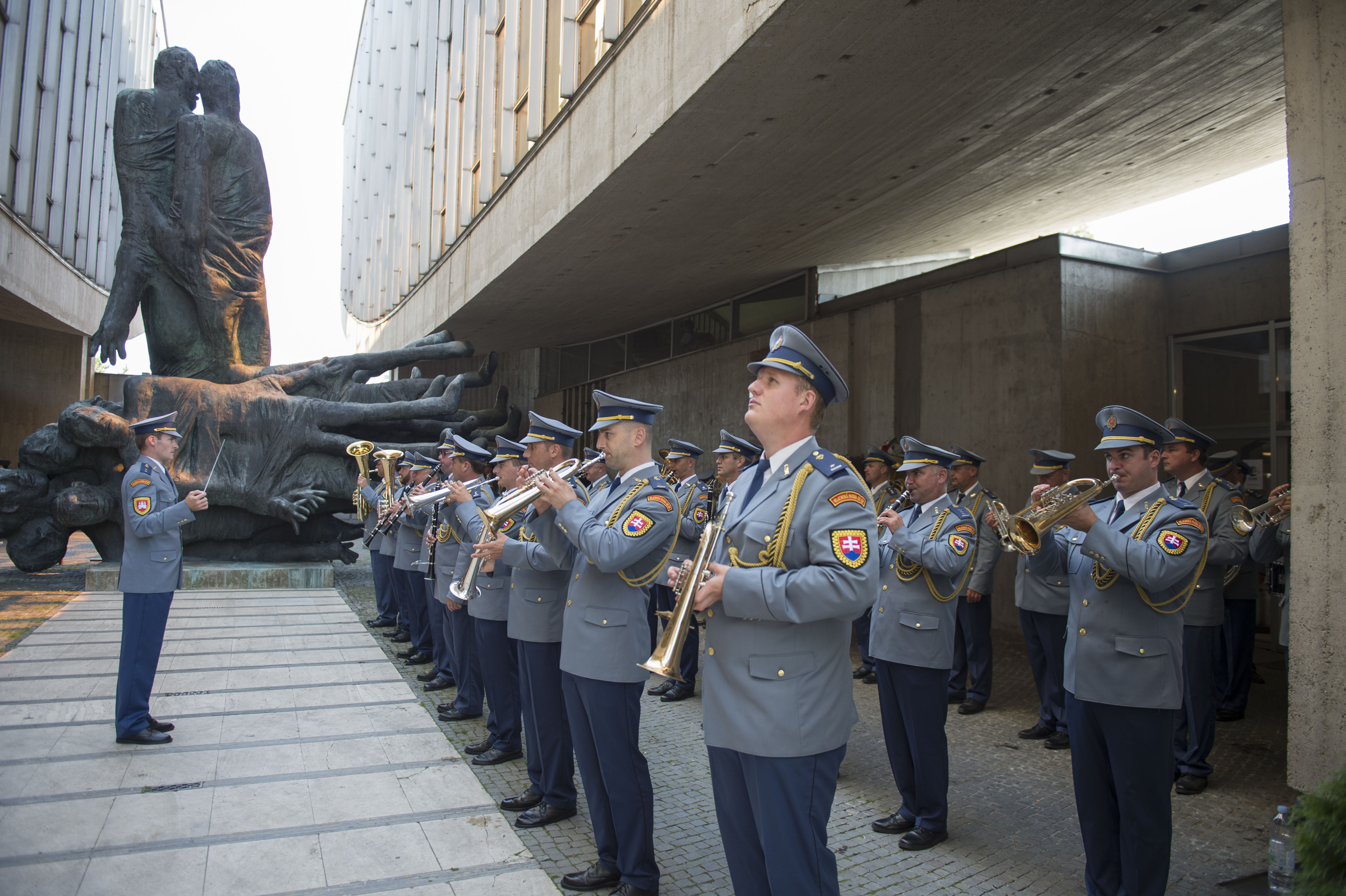

Background information
- Origin: Slovakia
- Genres: Brass/marching music
- Years active: October 1, 2002–present

The Military Music Band of the Armed Forces of the Slovak Republic (Slovak: Vojenská hudba Ozbrojených síl Slovenskej republiky) is a musical element of the Bratislava Military Command of the Slovak Armed Forces that serves as the primary military band in the Slovak Republic. It accompanies the Honour Guard of the President of the Slovak Republic military and national ceremonies, military oaths, and state funerals, all of which are protocol events. It also represents the military of Slovakia in festive events such as military tattoos and symphonic concerts. On July 1, 2009, it has been under the command of the Bratislava Garrison Headquarters, which was part of the Training Force and Support of the Armed Forces of the Slovak Republic. Exactly 5 years later, the Chief of Staff of the Slovak Ground Forces put the band under its jurisdiction. The director and commanding officer of the band is currently Major Peter Apolen, who has been serving in this position since 2005.
