= Seweryn Goszczyński =

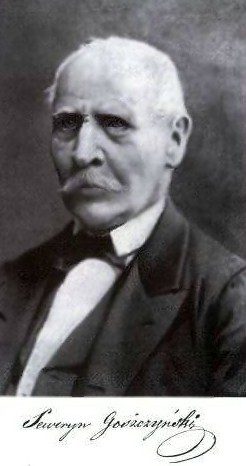
Serweryn Goszczyński

Seweryn Goszczyński (4 November 1801, Illintsi – 25 February 1876, Lviv) was a Polish Romantic prose writer and poet.

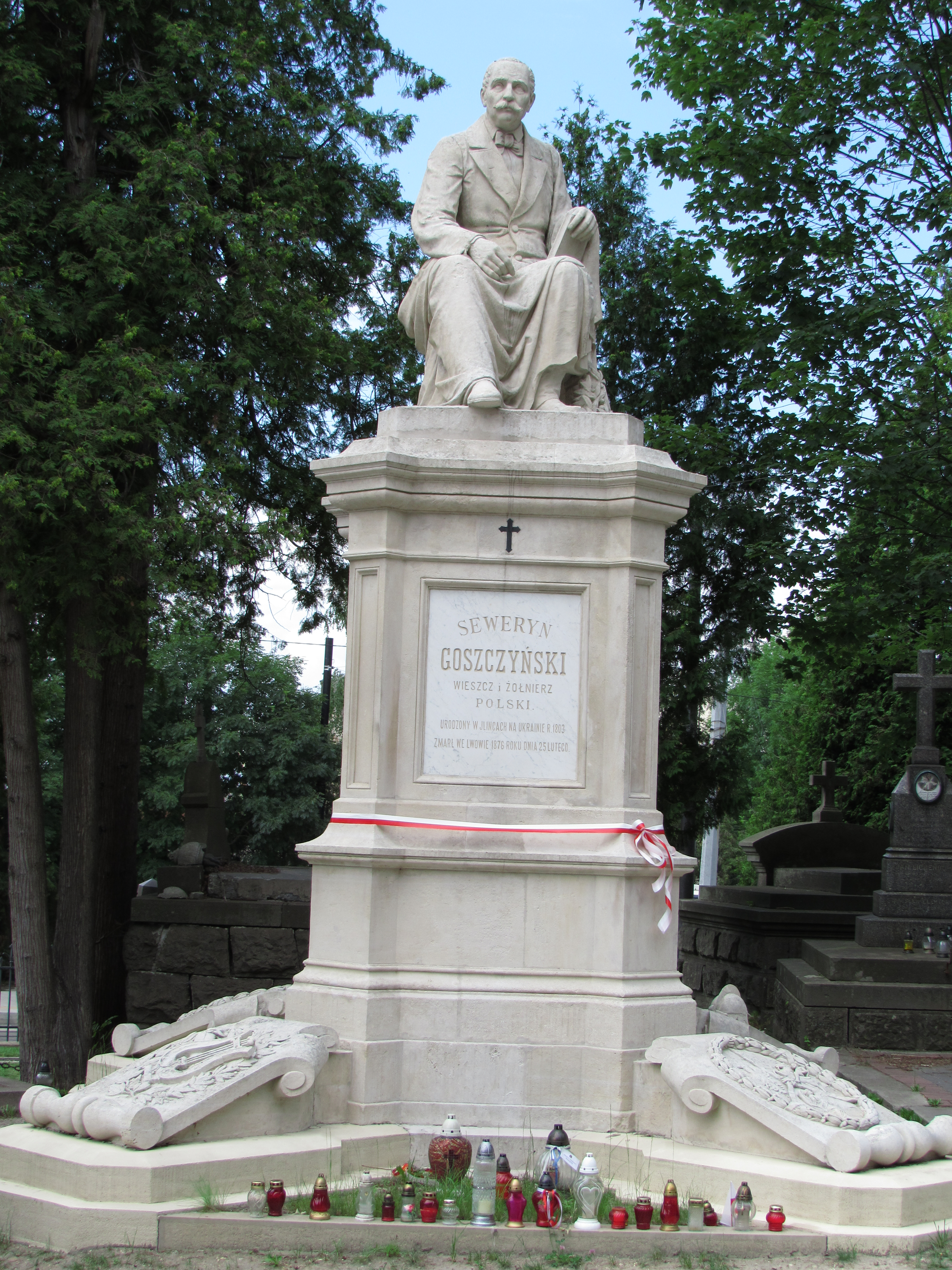
Tomb of Serweryn Goszczyński

== Life ==
He was born on 4 November 1801 in Ilińce, Russian Empire and hailed from a Polish noble family of the Pobóg coat of arms. He died in 1876 and was buried in the Łyczaków Cemetery in Lwów.

== See also ==
- Romanticism in Poland
