= Lucjan Siemieński =

Polish Romantic poet, prose writer, translator and literary critic

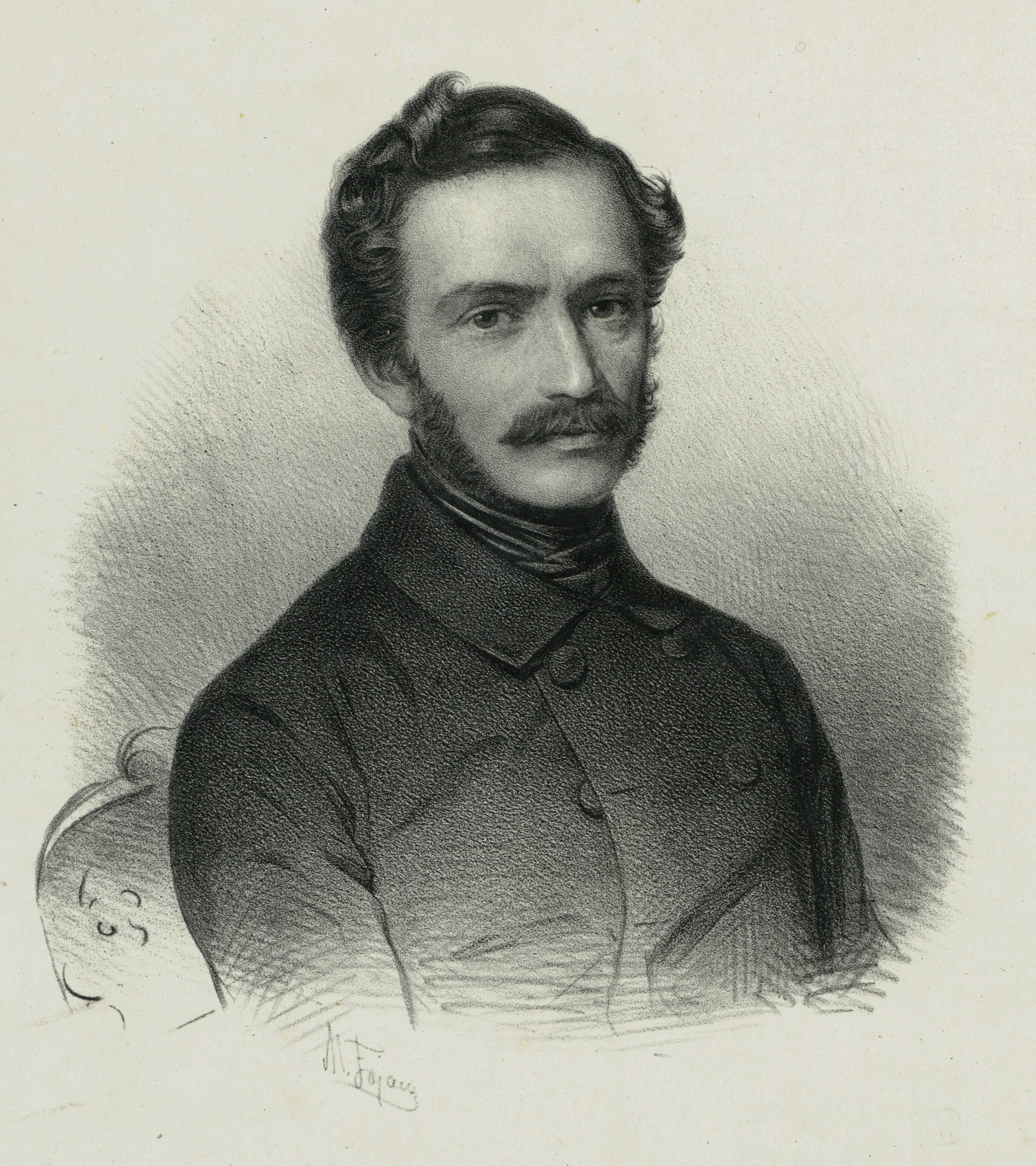
Lucjan Siemieński. Portrait by Maksymilian Fajans

Lucjan Hipolit Siemieński (13 August 1807 in Kamienna Góra near Żółkiew – 27 November 1877 in Kraków) was a Polish Romantic poet, prose writer, translator and literary critic.

== See also ==
- List of Poles
