= Illintsi =

City in Vinnytsia Oblast, Ukraine

Illintsi Іллінці
- City
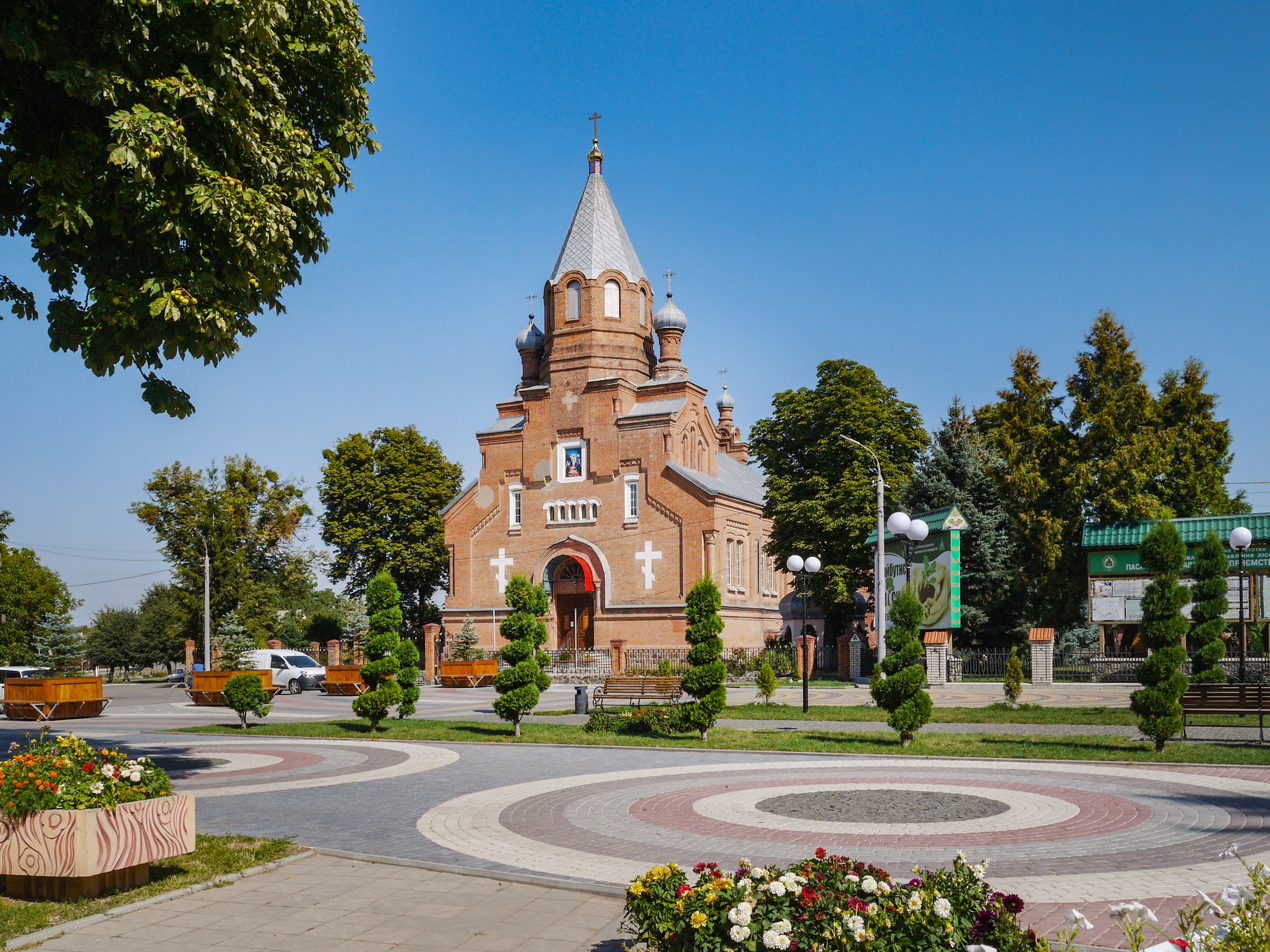
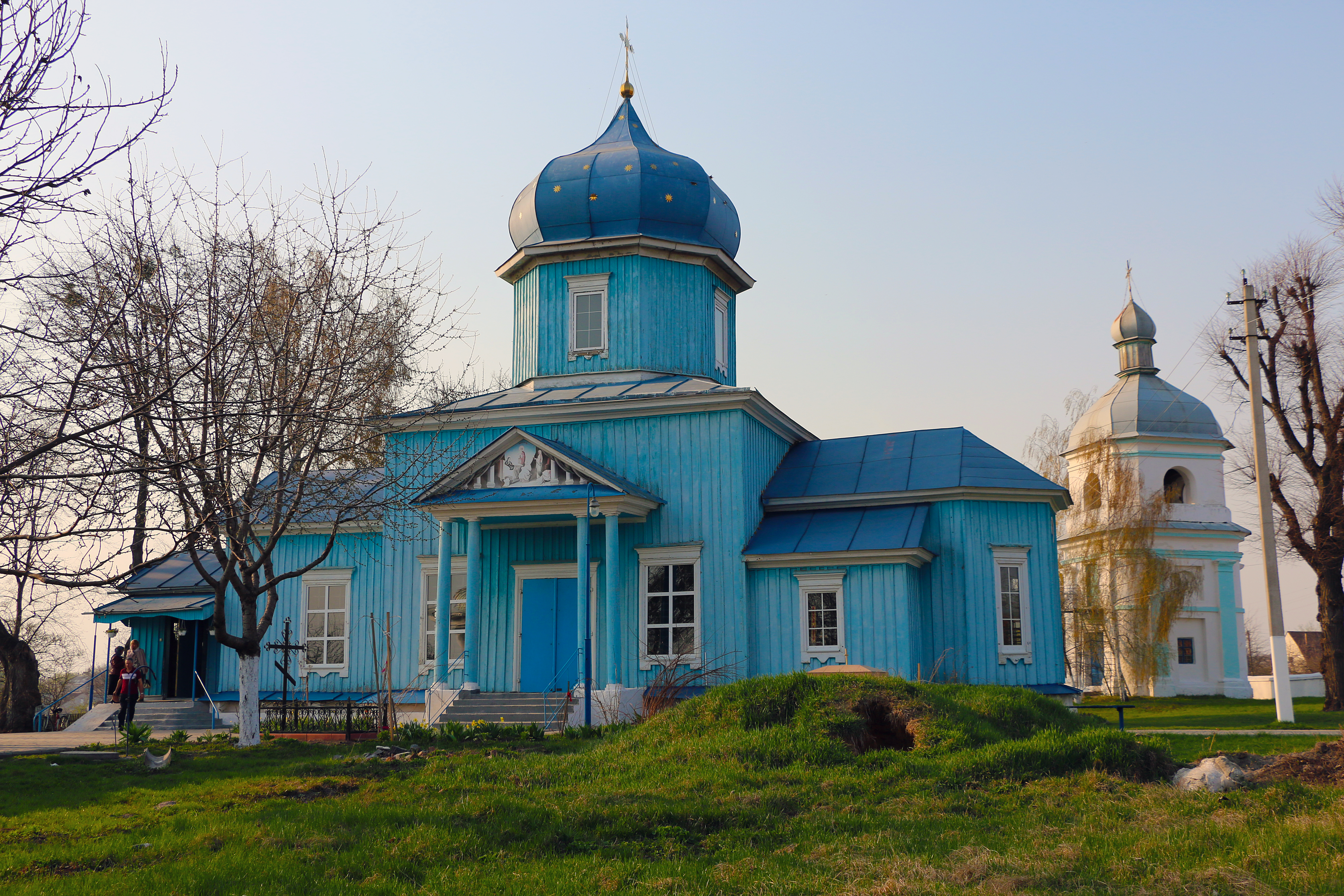
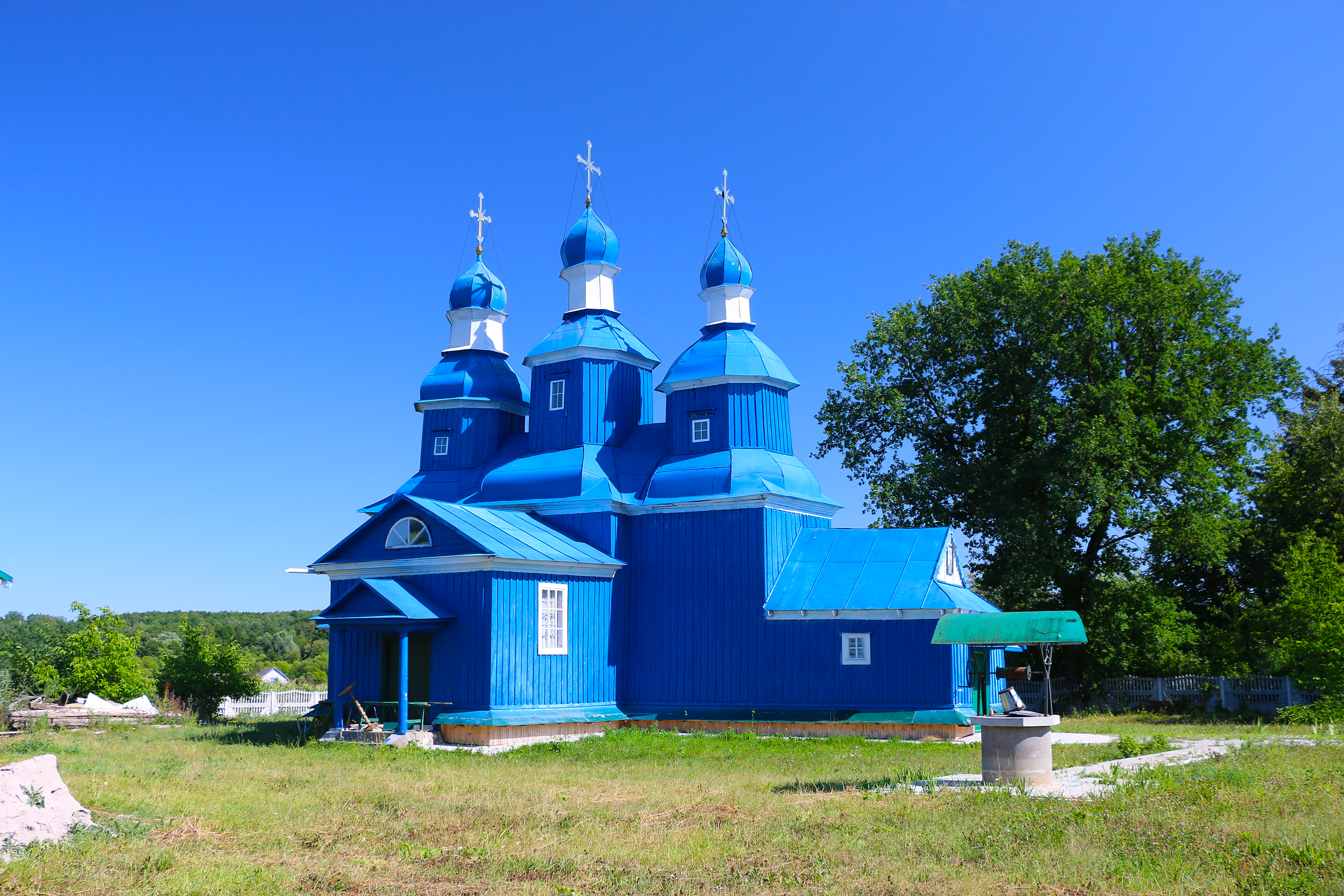
- Top: Resurrection Cathedral; bottom right: Saint Nicholas Church; bottom left: Church of Nativity of Theotokos

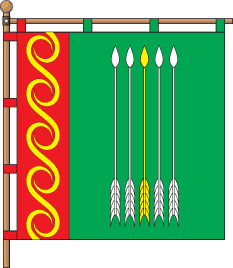
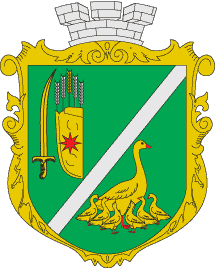
- Flag Coat of arms

- Location within Vinnytsia Oblast Location within Ukraine
- Coordinates: 49°06′20″N 29°12′32″E
- Country: Ukraine
- Oblast: Vinnytsia Oblast
- Raion: Vinnytsia Raion
- Hromada: Illintsi urban hromada
- Founded: 1391

Area
  - Total: 10.87 km^{2} (4.20 sq mi)

Population (2022)
  - Total: 11,095 ▼
  - Density: 1,021/km^{2} (2,644/sq mi)
- Postal code: 22700
- Area code: +380 4345

Illintsi (Ukrainian: Іллінці, IPA: [il⁽ʲ⁾ːin⁽ʲ⁾ˈts⁽ʲ⁾i]; Polish: Ilińce) is a city on the Sob river in Vinnytsia Oblast, Ukraine. It served as the administrative center of the former Illintsi Raion until 2020. Population: 10,405 (2024).

The Ilyinets crater is located not far from the city.

== History ==
Historical affiliations

Grand Duchy of Lithuania 1391–1569
Polish–Lithuanian Commonwealth 1569–1672
Ottoman Empire 1672–1699
Polish–Lithuanian Commonwealth 1699–1793
Russian Empire 1793–1917
Ukrainian People's Republic and Ukrainian State 1917–1920
Soviet Ukraine 1920–1922
Soviet Union 1922–1991
Ukraine 1991–present

A Scythian mound from the 2nd century BC was excavated near the city in 1901-1902 by N. Brabdenburg.

In 1757, Ilińce was granted Magdeburg rights by King Augustus III of Poland. It was a private town of the Crown of the Kingdom of Poland, located in the Bracław Voivodeship and owned by the Sanguszko family.

Before World War II, the majority of the population was Jewish. Germans entered the town in July 1941 and kept the Jews as prisoners in a ghetto soon after. In November 1941, 43 Jews were murdered by Hilfspolizei. On 24 April 1942, around 1,000 Jews from the town and nearby villages were assassinated in a mass execution. 700 others were murdered in May 1942. At the end of 1942, the remaining Jews of the town were deported to a labor camp and the ghetto was destroyed in December 1942.

During Soviet times Illintsi was the centre of Illintsi Raion. According to the State Statistics Service of Ukraine, as of 1 January 2022, Illintsi had a population of 11,095 residents.

== Economy ==
Illintsi is a centre of vegetable oil and sugar production.

== Twin towns ==
Illintsi is twinned with:

- Włoszczowa, Poland, since 23 August 2005
- Edineț, Moldova, since 13 September 2013
- Pakruojis, Lithuania, since 21 November 2016
- Smižany, Slovakia, since 5 May 2017.
