= Józef Bohdan Zaleski =

Polish poet (1802–1886)

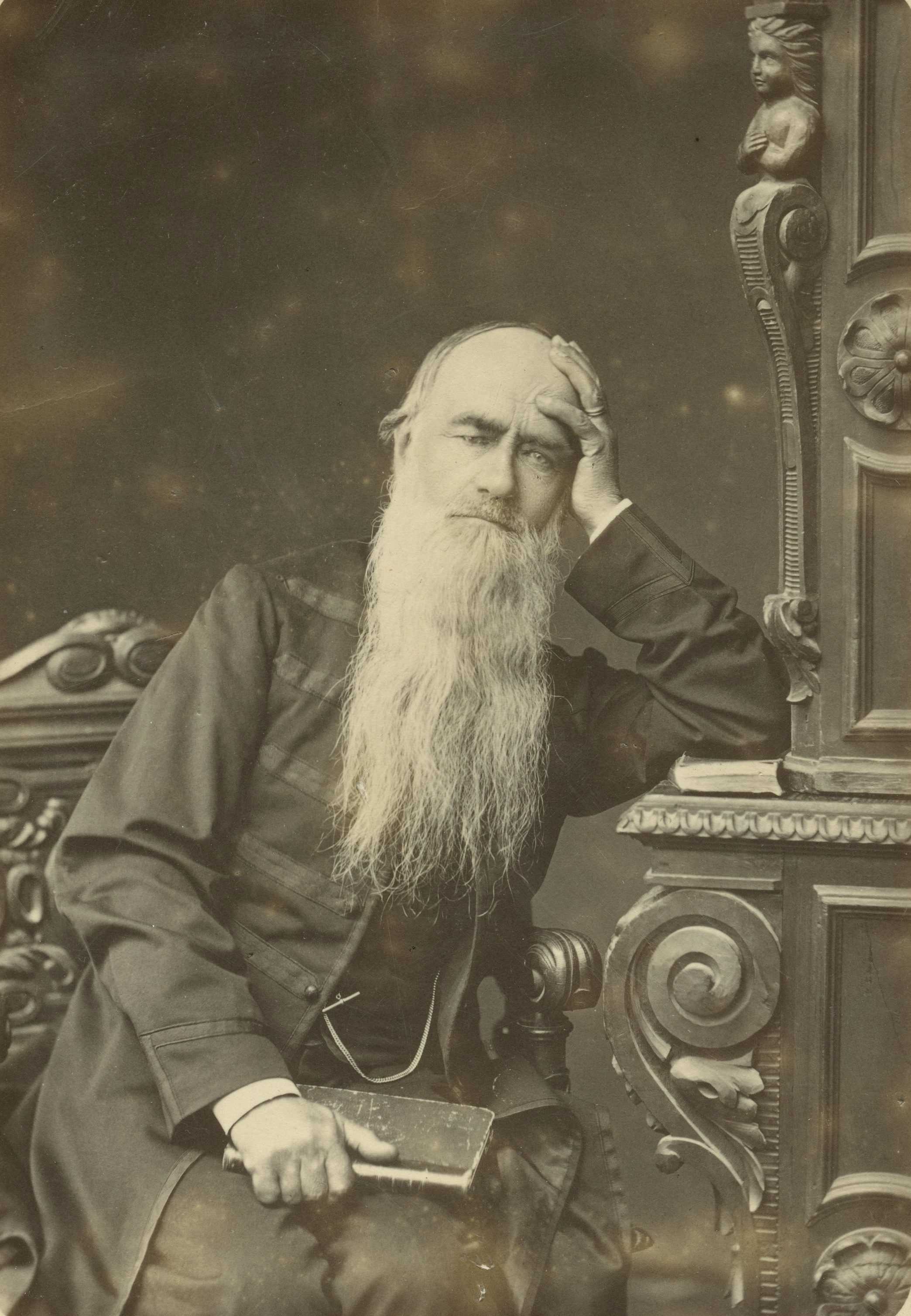
- Born: 14 February 1802; Bohatyrka, Kiev guberniya, Russian Empire
- Died: 31 March 1886 (aged 84); Villepreux, France
- Education: Imperial University of Warsaw
- Occupations: Translator; Poet
- Writing career
- Language: Polish
- Genre: Romanticsm Poetry

Józef Bohdan Zaleski (14 February 1802 – 31 March 1886) was a Polish Romantic poet. A friend of Adam Mickiewicz, Zaleski founded the Ukrainian poetic school.

== Life ==
Zaleski was a member of the secret patriotic organisation Związek Wolnych Polaków (1821); a participant of the November Uprising (1830–1831); a deputy of the Sejm (during the November Uprising 1830–1831); the co-founder (with Mickiewicz) of the religious brotherhood Towarzystwo Braci Zjednoczonych; and co-editor of a magazine, Nowa Polska.

== Works ==
Zaleski was associated with Romanticism and sentimentalism. He was the author of popular historical dumas (in which he refers to Ukrainian folklore); love and reflective lyrics inspired by folk poetry; religious poetry; as well as fantasy poems, sung poems, aphoristic poems, memoirs, translations (Serbian folk songs). Three of his songs were set to music by Frédéric Chopin (see Polish songs by Frédéric Chopin).

Dumas

- Dumka hetmana Kosińskiego (Dumka of Hetman Kosiński, 1823)
- Dumka Mazepy (Mazepa's Dumka)
- Czajki

Poems and lyrics

- Duch od stepu (The Spirit from the Steppe, 1841 poem)
- Jamby (Iambs), aphoristic poem
- Przenajświętsza Rodzina (The Most Holy Family, 1839; published in Poezje [Poems], vol. 2, 1842), religious poem
- Pyłki (Dust), aphoristic poem
- Rojenia wiośniane — sung poem
- Rusałki (1829) — fantasy poem
- Śliczny chłopiec — sung poem
- Śpiew poety (1823) — lyric
- Tędy, tędy leciał ptaszek — sung poem
- Duch od stepu (The Spirit from the Steppe, 1841 poem)

Collections

- Pisma zbiorowe (Collected Writings, vols. 1–4, 1877)
- Dzieła pośmiertne (Posthumous Works, vols. 1–2, 1891)
- Korespondencja (Correspondence, vols. 1–5, 1900–04)

== See also ==
- List of Poles
