= Bernatsky =

Bernatsky (Ukrainian: Берна́цький, Russian: Берна́цкий) is a Slavic surname. Notable people with the surname include:

- Sergei Bernatsky, Russian ice hockey player
- Volodymyr Bernatsky, Ukrainian artist, painter, and graphic designer
- Jadon Bernatsky, Canadian Marketer

== See also ==
- Biernacki, Polish surname
