= Kurjer Lubelski =

Kurjer Lubelski ("The Lublin Courier"; for part of its history the two letters U in an all-caps masthead appeared in pointed form: KVRJER LVBELSKI) is an historical newspaper that was published discontinuously — in five distinct phases — between 1865 and 1937 in the city of Lublin. The publication has considerable historical significance because of its association with many personages of Polish literature, and for other reasons, including the publication in its pages of a considerable amount of literary material in addition to daily news. The newspaper (esp. in its second phase) was responsible for bringing about a national awakening during the period of Partitions, not only in the Lublin Lands but in the whole country. The (freethinking) journal Myśl Niepodległa, edited by the poet Andrzej Niemojewski, wrote in 1910 of the Kurjer Lubelski that despite the vagaries of fate that its publication was subject to over the years it had arisen from "a certain cultural milieu to which it has consistently borne spiritual witness".

== Disambiguation note ==
The Kurjer Lubelski is not to be confused with (1) the Communist-era Polish daily newspaper, the Kurier Lubelski (with the letter "i" rather than a "j" in the word kurier), which began publication in Lublin on 24 March 1957 — to which the Kurjer Lubelski bears no resemblance except in name. The Kurjer Lubelski discussed here is also to be distinguished from several historical publications, including (2) the Nowy Kurjer Lubelski ("The New Lublin Courier") published by Franciszek Papiewski in 1913–1914; and (3) the newspaper of the same title, Kurjer Lubelski, an economic weekly published in 1915–1916 by Wanda Papiewska, Jan Hempel and Oktawian Zagrobski (40 issues in all; full title: Kurjer Lubelski: tygodnik społeczno-ekonomiczny, popularno-naukowy i literacki), which was (4) subsequently reactivated by Kazimierz Szczepański in 1925 (of the latter series there might have been only one issue published with the date of 25 June 1925).

== Publication history ==
=== Precursor phase (1830–1831) ===
The original Kuryer Lubelski, the precursor to all its subsequent incarnations, began publication as a de facto revolutionary organ that appeared for some 59 days as a four-page daily (no publication on Saturdays) between 9 December 1830 and 5 February 1831 during the November Uprising. The frequency of publication was alternately six numbers a week, three numbers a week, and irregularly. It was printed clandestinely at the (antiquated by the 19th-century standards) Drukarnia Rządowa printing press on handmade paper of inferior quality. Any issue of the original series would constitute at present an extremely rare bibliophile item, with only a handful of known copies (according to some estimates, exactly seventeen in number), of various dates, being preserved in library holdings worldwide. The founder, publisher, editor-in-chief, and primary contributor was Jan Czyński (1801–1867).

=== Phase I (1865–1879) & phase II (1906–1913) ===
The modern-era Kurjer Lubelski, without an obvious connection to the original revolutionary broadsheet, commenced publication with the issue of 18 (30) December 1865, with the frequency of publication of two issues per week: it was founded by Julian Konrad Liedtke (1835–1870). The first publisher of the newspaper was Władysław Jan Kossakowski (1833–1870), with Liedtke as the first editor-in-chief. The editorship was taken over by Lucjan Dembowski in 1869 (beginning with vol. 4, No. 1), and again in the same year by Władysław Wdowiński (beginning with vol. 4, No. 97). From 1875 onwards the editor-in-chief was Teofil Głębocki. The paper was often published with extra supplements with separate mastheads that read, Dodatek do Nr... Kurjera Lubelskiego ("Supplement to No... of The Kurjer Lubelski"), etc. The frequency (as well as the format) of publication underwent significant variations throughout the newspaper's history, but it was not a daily newspaper (excluding Sundays and bank holidays) until 1878. From 1875 the newspaper appeared without the volume number being indicated in the masthead. In 1879 the publication merged with the Gazeta Lubelska and continued publication under the latter title — not to be reactivated independently as Kurjer Lubelski until 1906 when this was done on the initiative of Mieczysław Biernacki whose efforts spelled the beginning of a golden age in the newspaper's life. The first issue of the revived Kurjer Lubelski, published on 4 January 1906 under the editorship of Władysław Stodolnicki, was initially followed by only 15 additional numbers. However, the newspaper survived, rising to the premier position among the press of the Lublin Land, until it was banned by the censorship of the Russian Empire on 27 June 1913. During its second phase the publication was associated with such personages who served on the editorial board as Stefan Żeromski, Witold Chodźko, Mieczysław Biernacki, the well-known physician and social activist Aleksander Staniszewski (1858–1926), and most memorably the philosopher Jan Hempel (1877–1937) who acted as secretary to the Board.

=== Phase III (1914) ===
In 1914 Mieczysław Biernacki reactivated the banned newspaper under the altered title Codzienny Kurjer Lubelski ("The Daily Lublin Courier"). It ceased publication with the outbreak of the First World War in August 1914.

=== Phase IV (1932) ===
The newspaper was yet again revived in independent Poland in 1932, the paper now being published with the subtitle: Kurjer Lubelski: pismo codzienne ("The Lublin Courier: A Daily Newspaper); it managed to stay afloat for less than one year due to financial difficulties caused in part by the loss of government advertising and by the frequent confiscations of whole print runs of individual issues by the Sanacja régime. The editorial board of the Kurjer Lubelski was known for its impartiality and tolerance of a broad spectrum of views: the editorial line was to support the government of the day without any political partisanship while at the same time championing the rights of the individual citizen. From 1 January to 11 May 1932 the Kurjer Lubelski was being edited and published by the poet Józef Czechowicz, followed in the post of the editor-in-chief by Zygmunt Grochowski, and then again from 15 October 1932 by another poet, Józef Łobodowski, and lastly from 20 November 1932 by Longin Kozłowski. The paper folded after the issue of 30 November 1932. While economically unviable, the publication enjoyed the high reputation stemming from its association in the past with such notable Polish writers as Stefan Żeromski, who had honoured it with his contributions. It had a distinct literary profile during this phase, publishing among others the works of such distinguished poets as Józef Czechowicz, Józef Łobodowski, Franciszka Arnsztajnowa, Bronisław Ludwik Michalski (1903–1935), Antoni Madej (1899–1989), Zygmunt Karski (1898–1967), Czesław Miłosz, and Jadwiga Gamska-Łempicka (1903–1956), as well as the prose writings by Franciszka Arnsztajnowa (novellas), Marian Piechal (1905–1989), and Aniela Fleszarowa, the author of Celofanki: poematy prozą (1939).

=== Phase V (1937) ===
Finally, the paper was briefly revived one last time between 22 March 1937 and 2 April 1937, by Józef Łobodowski, its penultimate editor in the previous phase of 1932, under the unaltered title of Kurjer Lubelski: pismo codzienne. However, it folded after just nine issues owing to the insuperable competition from nationwide newspapers branching out into mass-market regional spinoffs that flooded the Lublin market, making a publication like the Kurjer Lubelski — targeted as it was primarily to the much smaller intelligentsia segment of the reading public — unable to compete with the economies of scale and market dominance of the larger corporates. For reasons not entirely clear, copies of the Kurjer Lubelski belonging to the Phase V series are extremely rare, potentially constituting valuable bibliophile items (no copy is known to have been preserved in library holdings anywhere). In his memoirs published towards the end of his life, Łobodowski avowed that during the brief period of the Kurjer Lubelski's revival in 1937 he endeavoured to endue the daily with a strong Promethean current, that is to say to make it an organ "of the struggle to disband the Russian–Soviet empire into its constituent parts".
