= Franciszka Arnsztajnowa =

Polish poet, playwright, and translator

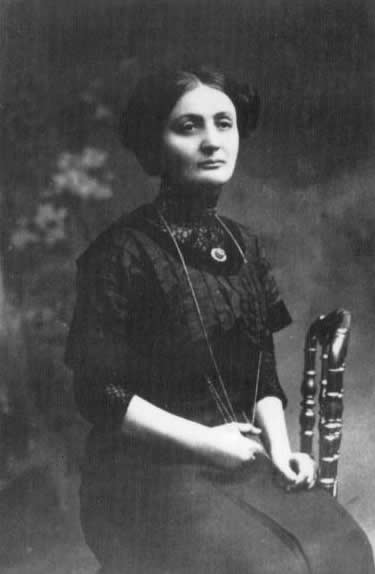
- Arnsztajnowa c. 1890s
- Born: Franciszka Hanna Meyerson; 19 February 1865; Lublin, Congress Poland
- Died: 3 August 1942 (aged 77); Warsaw Ghetto, Warsaw, Nazi-occupied Poland (disputed)
- Occupations: Poet; playwright; writer; translator; editor; social and political activist
- Spouse: Marek "Mordko" Arnsztein (m. 1885; died 1930)
- Children: Stefanja Arnsztajnówna (married name Mieczysławska; c. 1890–1942; daughter); Jan Arnsztajn (1897–1934; son)
- Relatives: Janina Arnsztajn-Titkow (1923–2010; granddaughter)
- Writing career
- Pen name: F. A. M. J. Górecka; Jan Gorecki; Jan Górecki; Stefan Orlik
- Period: Young Poland; First World War; Interbellum; Second World War
- Genres: Modernism; Neo-romanticism; lyric poetry
- Notable works: Poezye: serya druga (1899); Odloty (1932)
- Notable awards: Silver Laurel of the Polish Academy of Literature (1936)

Franciszka Hanna Arnsztajnowa (Polish: [fraɲˈt͡ɕiʂka arnʂtajˈnɔva]; née Meyerson; 19 February 1865 – August 1942) was a Polish poet, playwright, and translator of Jewish descent. Much of her creative oeuvre falls within the Young Poland period, stylistically encompassing the twilight of neo-romanticism. She is called "the legend of Lublin".

== Family ==
Franciszka Arnsztajnowa was the daughter of the Lublin-based novelist Malwina Meyerson (real name, Małka Meyerson, née Horowicz or Horowitz; 1839–1921), a Lublin native, and Bernard (Berek, or Ber) Meyerson (b. 1837), a native of Tykocin, an international trader and a major Lublin financier. Her brother was the French philosopher, Émile Meyerson, based in Paris. She attended high school for girls in Lublin, and went to Germany for higher studies in biology, travelling extensively in Europe. On 7 January 1885 she married Marek Arnsztein (alternative spellings: Arnsztejn, Arnsztajn, Arnstein; 1855–1930), a physician educated in Warsaw, Vienna, Berlin, and Paris, and a political and social activist, a native of Kazimierz Dolny based in Lublin from 1884. They had a daughter, Stefanja Arnsztajnówna (c. 1890–1942; married name Mieczysławska), and a son, Jan Arnsztajn (1897–1934), much beloved of Arnsztajnowa and whose death from tuberculosis left her devastated.

== Life and work ==
As a poet Arnsztajnowa debuted at the age of 23 with the poem "Na okręcie" (On Board a Ship) published in the newspaper Kuryer Codzienny of 1 October 1888. She issued her first collection of poetry in book form in 1895 under the title Poezye, a volume which she dedicated to her mother, the novelist Malwina Meyerson. The book is divided into six distinct sections under such headings as "Sonety" (Sonnets), "Melodye" (Melodies), "Historye" (Histories), and "Z gór Tyrolu" (From the Mountains of Tyrol). The opening poem, untitled but beginning with the words "O nie płacz..." (Weep thou not...; p. 7), sets the tone for the entire collection as she tries, with uncommon tenderness and filial piety, to soothe her mother's pain at having her own songs dispersed by the winds of time to the farthermost recesses of the soul: the implication is that the poems in this collection will become her mother's own, which the daughter will now sing for her, the lute in hand, sitting at her feet. (In the very last poem of the collection the poet again addresses her mother directly, "O mother, why give me a heart so | Tender...") The chief characteristic of the collection, thematically speaking, was however the preoccupation and love she evinced for the people living close to the land, their ordinary lives and folkloric customs. At the same time she delicately touched upon the social questions of the day employing language in the balladic-melancholic key. The volume will instantly establish Arnsztajnowa as a major voice in Polish poetry among those exploring the nation's folk themes.

Her next collection appeared in 1899 under the title Poezye: serya druga ("Verses: Second Series"; 2nd ed., 1911). The latter volume contains the poem "Z nocy bezsennych" (Out of the Sleepless Nights) dedicated to her husband, Marek Arnsztein, as well as the memorable "Wspomnienie Meranu" (A Remembrance of Merano) that evokes her travels in the Trentino-Alto Adige region of Italy, and which begins:

Meran… pamiętam… nieraz dziś w zimy rozgwarze,
Mroźnem tchnieniem owiana, nagle zamknę oczy,
I o błogosławionej dolinie zamarzę.
__________________________________

Meran… I recall… as nowadays oft by winter's clamorous decree
Frosty gusts me shroud, I soon close my eyes asudden
And slip down the blessed valley into reverie.

Wacław Gralewski (1900–1972), a poet and prominent Lublin littérateur, cites a report (which he qualifies as uncorroborated) that Arnsztajnowa was supposed to undergo a (successful) therapy for tuberculosis at Merano, an option open only to the very rich.

=== The First World War ===
O Dniu Jutrzejszy! Krwi bratniej opary
Kryją przed nami twoją tajemnicę;
Lecz my śmiertelne zedrzem gzło, by w lice
Twe spojrzeć. Obcy nam lęk, co ofiary
Głowę pochyla przed obliczem kata,
Wiemy, że Jutro to za Dziś zapłata.

Oto Dziś w imię Jutra na nas woła.
Czas wzrok od grobów odwrócić pokuty!
Włos otrząsając popiołem przysuty,
Twardym szyszakiem nakrywamy czoła,
By krzepką dłonią wśród gruzu i łomu
Kielnią i mieczem stawiać węgły domu.

"O Dniu Jutrzejszy" (O, Thou Day of the Morrow!; 1914)
— from Archanioł jutra (1924)

During the First World War Arnsztajnowa (nom de guerre Ara) participated in armed struggle for the independence of Poland as a member of the secret Polish Military Organisation in Lublin (her town house in the Old Town of Lublin served as a secret archive of the POW and a hub for other organizations, such as the Union of Armed Struggle and the clandestine Polish boy scout movement; the expansive basement served as an arsenal). Some of the patriotic feelings and motivations that actuated her participation in the freedom struggle will later find an echo in her collection of poetry entitled Archanioł jutra ("The Archangel of the Morrow"), comprising verses written during the war, which she will publish in 1924 dedicating it to the alumni of the Lublin schools who had fallen in that struggle. With two compositions included in the volume Arnsztajnowa paid tribute to the luminaries of Polish literature, Marja Konopnicka and Bolesław Prus, both recently deceased then. However, it is to Stefan Żeromski (after his death in 1925) that Arnsztajnowa will in the latter part of her life acknowledge her indebtedness for the general character of her oeuvre and the direction she followed in creating it.

Archanioł jutra contains verses of great strength and incisiveness, unparalleled in her prior work, the composition "O Dniu Jutrzejszy" (O, Thou Day of the Morrow!), written in 1914, belonging to the most beautiful among them in the opinion of the historian of literature, Feliks Araszkiewicz. The poem speaks of the brethren's (comrades-in-arms') blood shed in the struggle, whose rising vapours conceal the mystery of tomorrow (the day is personified in the poem, addressed as "you", and conceived of as a day of reckoning, indeed, as a metonymy for retributive justice itself): the mystery of tomorrow will be revealed once we tear down your deadly veil to look you directly in the face, without the sort of fear that makes the victim bow his head before the executioner: for tomorrow we know full well will be the day of payback for today. (The poem, heavily dependent on stylized linguistics and medieval vocabulary (e.g., gzło, line 3, a medieval term for a kind of female garment, here used figuratively in the sense of "veil"), does not lend itself easily to verse translation but is reproduced in the original to the left.) Thus the archangel of the title of the entire collection, Archanioł jutra ("The Archangel of the Morrow"), can easily be construed as the avenging angel.

Another composition belonging to this period is the poem entitled "Powrót" (The Return) published in a literary journal in April 1916. Comprising five ottava rima stanzas, the 40-line poem brought her the Silver Laurel of the Polish Academy of Literature, a (now historical) body awarding the most prestigious literary honours of the land at the time.

=== The interwar period ===
During the Interbellum Arnsztajnowa collaborated with the newspapers and literary magazines Dziennik Lubelski, Kamena, and Kurjer Lubelski; she was the editor-in-chief of the literary supplement Dodatek Literacki to the newspaper Ziemia Lubelska. At the same time she was the moving spirit of the literary life of the city of Lublin, a fact recognized by outside observers, co-founding in 1932, together with the poet Józef Czechowicz, the Lublin section of the writers' union, the Związek Literatów (see Polish Writers' Union), of which she served as the president. To this period, in addition to the aforementioned collection Archanioł jutra (1924), belong also her volumes of poetry entitled Odloty ("Flying Away"; 1932), a compilation of verses published in literary journals between 1902 and 1926, and the collection produced jointly with Józef Czechowicz, Stare kamienie ("Old Stones"; 1934) which was at once a tribute to her beloved Lublin, a city in which she continued to reside until 1934, epitomized in the poem "Tobie śpiewam, Lublinie" (To You do I Sing, O Lublin!), and a form of a literary farewell. Contemporary critics observed that the unspecified nature of the collaboration between the two famous poets gave the publication an anonymous tinge, and although subsequent scholarship clearly differentiated between the pieces written by Arnsztajnowa and those written by Czechowicz mistakes of attribution did occur in succeeding years and decades.

Odloty represents a continuation of the modernist esthetics that dominated the first phase of Arnsztajnowa's literary life, as evidenced in the imagery employed and in the method of shaping of the lyrical persona, as well as in the return of the fairy-tale motifs favoured by the Young Poland poets, such as lakes, mirrors, and shadows. Although on occasion she adopts a new cadence closer to the spirit of the Skamander circle then gaining an ascendancy over Polish poetics, such diversions are rare. The title poem, "Odloty" (Flying Away), first printed in a literary magazine in 1905, is a mystical allegory on the inevitability of the departure, of parting despite the ties thereby shattered.

Arnsztajnowa was co-founder of the historically important Kraków periodical Życie famously associated with the artistic avant-garde and with the person of Stanisław Przybyszewski, for which she wrote a programmatic poem, and had close ties to the literary magazine Kamena (see Kamena), founded and edited by K. A. Jaworski: the journal began publication in 1933 with a poem by Arnsztajnowa, "Na Olejnej" (In Olejna Street), on the first page of the first issue.

Right-wing critics (such as Juljan Babiński, 1900–1943) accused Arnsztajnowa of left-wing bias against the szlachta, in favour of the common people.

==== Prose ====
Arnsztajnowa's innumerable writings in prose, strewn across innumerable journals and magazines, frequently published under pseudonyms that even Arnsztajnowa could not keep track of during her lifetime, present an impossible task for a compiler wishing to present a reasonably comprehensive picture of her bibliography — as observed by the historian of literature and her contemporary, Feliks Araszkiewicz (1895–1966). Among the pen-names she is known to have used are J. Górecka, and Stefan Orlik.

==== Dramatic works ====
Arnsztajnowa's dramatic works remain largely confined to manuscript, including her award-winning play Na wyżynach (Krystyna) ("On the Heights: Christina") which was staged to great acclaim in Lvov in 1899. Her other plays which were seen on the stages of Kraków and Łódź, in addition to those of Lublin and Lvov, but which remain unpublished, are (with dates of theatre production) Na kuracji ("A Stay at a Spa"; 1894), Perkun ("Perkūnas"; 1896), and W stojącej wodzie ("In the Stagnant Water"; 1901). Only two one-act plays have been published (in literary journals), Widmo: Ballada w I akcie ("The Spectre: A Ballad in One Act"; published in Ateneum in 1905, a dialogue between two characters identified only as male and female), and Luxoniolo (published in the Kurjer Lubelski in 1911). The play Córka ("The Daughter") has never been staged or published.

==== Translatorial work and other avocations ====
Arnsztajnowa participated in the women's suffrage movement, supporting with readings from her poems the meetings and events of organizations involved in the movement, including the Związek Równouprawnienia Kobiet Polskich (Union for the Equal Rights of Polish Women) founded in 1907 by Paulina Kuczalska-Reinschmit (1859–1921). In 1912 Arnsztajnowa participated in a feminist exhibition mounted by Polish women writers in Prague.

Apart from her own extensive poetic oeuvre, Arnsztajnowa produced several translations from English literature. Her translation of Douglas Jerrold's famous Mrs Caudle's Curtain Lectures, published in 1923 as Nauki małżeńskie pani Caudle, was issued with the name of the translator concealed under a pseudonym (Stefan Orlik) as she did not wish to lend the prestige that her name enjoyed in the domain of poetry to what she considered to be her avocation. Her translations of H. G. Wells's The Sea Lady: A Tissue of Moonshine (published as Syrena: księżycowa opowieść in 1927), and of W. Somerset Maugham's novel The Painted Veil (published as Malowana zasłona in 1935, 2 vols.), were issued with the name of the translator fully identified. She also collaborated with Helena Niemirowska in the translation of Rudyard Kipling's Puck of Pook's Hill (published as Puk in 1924) for which she provided verse translations. Despite their being overshadowed by the larger translations of whole novels, Professor Araszkiewicz considered Arnsztajnowa's translations of those relatively small poetic fragments — and not the large bodies of prose translation — to be among her most notable achievements in the field. Her versions of Kipling's "Cities and Thrones and Powers" and "Harp Song of the Dane Women" (poems from Puck of Pook's Hill) were published separately in literary magazines. Similarly, her 1932 translation of a 12-verse excerpt from the French of Les Stances by Jean Moréas (Book 3; XII), beginning

O toi qui sur mes jours de tristesse et d'épreuve
Seule reluis encor...

reads better than the original:

O, ty, co dni mych smutkom i zmaganiom
blaskiem przyświecasz wytrwałym...

Always respectful of and ready to honour others for their achievement in their field, in 1899 Arnsztajnowa contributed to the liber amicorum for Aleksander Świętochowski on the occasion of the 25th anniversary of his editorial work, a sumptuously produced volume that opens with her poem "Grajek" (The Fiddler; from the Poezye of 1895). Some of her tributes in verse, even when marked by a high level of artistic accomplishment, were entirely private, meant solely for the honouree. Her poem composed in tribute to the Polish geographer, Wacław Nałkowski (1851–1911), the father of the writer Zofja Nałkowska, on the occasion of the 25th anniversary of his scholarly work in January 1903, did not come to light until 55 years later, for example. Her patriotic feelings found expression in the contribution she made to the collective volume published by the Teachers' Union to commemorate the school strikes in Partitioned Poland mounted in protest against marginalization of Polish culture by the occupying powers; while in 1935 Arnsztajnowa served on the editorial board of a commemorative volume for the Polish Military Organisation, to which she contributed the keynote poem (on the theme of the Unknown Soldier) serving as a motto for the publication.

Arnsztajnowa's patriotism was most aptly reflected in three poems — "Jego Imię" (His Name), "O, Wodzu!" (O Leader!), and "Wodzowi-twórcy" (To the Leader-Creator) — to the collection of panegyrics in honour of Józef Piłsudski published in 1924, two years before his coup d'état of May 1926. Among the 33 contributors to the collection (some of them not established poets), only the names of Józef Czechowicz, Jan Lechoń and Kazimierz Tetmajer stand in the same rank with Arnsztajnowa's. After the coup d'état of May 1926, during a visit to Lublin in June 1931 of Piłsudski's figurehead president, Ignacy Mościcki, she wrote a fulsome welcome for him in a local newspaper ("whole streets are running out to Him with open arms while ancient city walls silvered by age reverberate with the Good News: hail Thou the visible manifestation of the Independence!", etc.).

==== Antisemitic attacks on Arnsztajnowa ====
In 1910 and 1911 Arnsztajnowa was the object of a book boycott motivated by antisemitic sentiment and spearheaded by the Endecja circles.

In the summer of 1937 Arnsztajnowa, then a 72-year-old grande dame of Polish literature (a recipient of the Silver Laurel of the Polish Academy of Literature and a decorated veteran of the Polish war of independence), was the victim of antisemitic attacks from the Endecja literary circles connected with the literary magazine Prosto z mostu of Warsaw, a publication billing itself in the masthead as an artistic-literary weekly, edited and published by Stanisław Piasecki (1900–1941). In its edition of 25 July 1937 the magazine in question carried a quasi-anonymous racist and in parts scurrilously versified polemic signed only "(st. p.)" (which would have been universally understood by readers to refer to Piasecki) in which Arnsztajnowa was called, sarcastically, the "erector of the edifice of the Polish language" (sc., one of the primary forces shaping the mother tongue) without being Polish. Although other Polish writers of Jewish descent were held up to ridicule by name as well, Arnsztajnowa was selected for special treatment. "Consider this efflorescence of Polish speech from under the aegis of Arnsztajnowa", jeered the writer of the article, presenting his readers with a sentence taken out of context from one of Arnsztajnowa's articles (on the complex subject of the phenomenology of contemporary French culture), which was supposed to offend against linguistic norm (it had, in fact, a typographical error involving the omission of a single letter). The attack on Arnsztajnowa continued under the guise of an attack on Ludwik Fryde (1912–1942), despite his young age already a distinguished literary critic of Jewish descent, whose surname was altered to "frydek" so that it might rhyme with żydek ("the little jew", the lower-case initials employed for their added insulting value) while the author went on: "so it is among us that every common-or-garden pederast, if he has talent, he bandies it about", etc. The incident generated a groundswell of support for her from the Polish reading public, including an open letter signed by many writers and poets, some of whom also published individual expressions of support — as did, for example, Józef Łobodowski, calling the attack "outrageous and revolting".

After Łobodowski's protest published in the most prestigious literary journal of the interbellum epoch, the Wiadomości Literackie, Piasecki remained unrepentant, and a fresh antisemitic attack on Arnsztajnowa was printed with additional vitriol in the Prosto z mostu edition of 8 August 1937. The antisemitic and homophobic attack on Arnsztajnowa and others was originally authored by Jerzy Pietrkiewicz and published in the ultra-nationalist and antisemitic periodical Myśl Narodowa ("National Thought"), but Prosto z mostu went beyond the text of the original racist pasquinade in its attempt to disseminate, defend and justify it. For its part Myśl Narodowa will continue its attack on Arnsztajnowa on other fronts, bemoaning (in its issue of 29 August 1937) "the pernicious Jewish dispensation (gospodarka żydów) in the field of literature" for which the evidence was to be the supposed falsification by Niemirowska and Arnsztajnowa of Kipling (through their alleged toning down or expurgation of antisemitic passages in the works of this author).

=== Death ===
Published sources differ on the circumstances of her death, but there is a consensus that she did not die in Lublin, all the sources citing the Warsaw Ghetto—a place where she had gone proudly and of her own accord "to be with everybody"—as either the place of her death or the place of her deportation immediately before her death. In some accounts she died in the Warsaw Ghetto of an infectious disease (typhus); according to other accounts she was violently murdered there by the Nazis, or took poison out of despair after seeing her daughter, Stefanja (who in all accounts accompanied her in the Warsaw Ghetto), shot dead by the Nazis. In some sources she was murdered after being deported from the Warsaw Ghetto to the Treblinka extermination camp (the most common narrative, but no more reliable than the other versions). Most authorities agree that she died in 1942, at the age of 77; however, one otherwise well-informed writer cites 1943 as the year of her death. In perhaps the most reliable eyewitness report, that of the poet Hanna Mortkowicz-Olczakowa (1905–1968), at the moment of her death—during the mass murder of patients at a hospital near All Saints' Church in Warsaw where she lay ill—Arnsztajnowa had two books with her, Dante's Divine Comedy and her own collection of poetry published in 1932, Odloty (Flying Away), on the poetics of departure.

Arnsztajnowa's first book, Poezye (1895), published when she was 30, contains this reference to Dante Alighieri:

I ja byłem w piekle… we śnie, czy na jawie
Niewiem… lecz, zaprawdę, Danta piekieł kręgi
Mąk takich nie mieszczą, nie szarpią tak krwawie…
___________________________

To hell I've also been… in dream or waking hours
Can't say… but, forsooth, Dante's infernal circles
Contain not such torment as bloodily overpowers…

=== Postscript ===
Franciszka Arnsztajnowa was decorated by the government of the Second Polish Republic with the Cross of Valour (Krzyż Walecznych), the Cross of Independence (Krzyż Niepodległości), as well as the Knight's Cross (Krzyż Kawalerski) of the Order of Polonia Restituta, one of the country's highest honours. She was the recipient of the Silver Laurel of the Polish Academy of Literature in 1936. She has a street named after herself in Lublin, the ulica Franciszki Arnsztajnowej.

== Works ==
=== Poetry ===
- Poezye (1895)
- Poezye: serya druga (1899)
- Archanioł jutra (1924)
- Odloty (1932)
- Stare kamienie (1934)

=== Drama ===
- Widmo: Ballada w I akcie (1905)
- Luxoniolo (1911)

== See also ==
- Émile Meyerson
- Józef Czechowicz
- Józef Łobodowski
