= Lithuanian Square =

Square in Lublin, Poland

Coordinates: 51°14′55″N 22°33′35″E

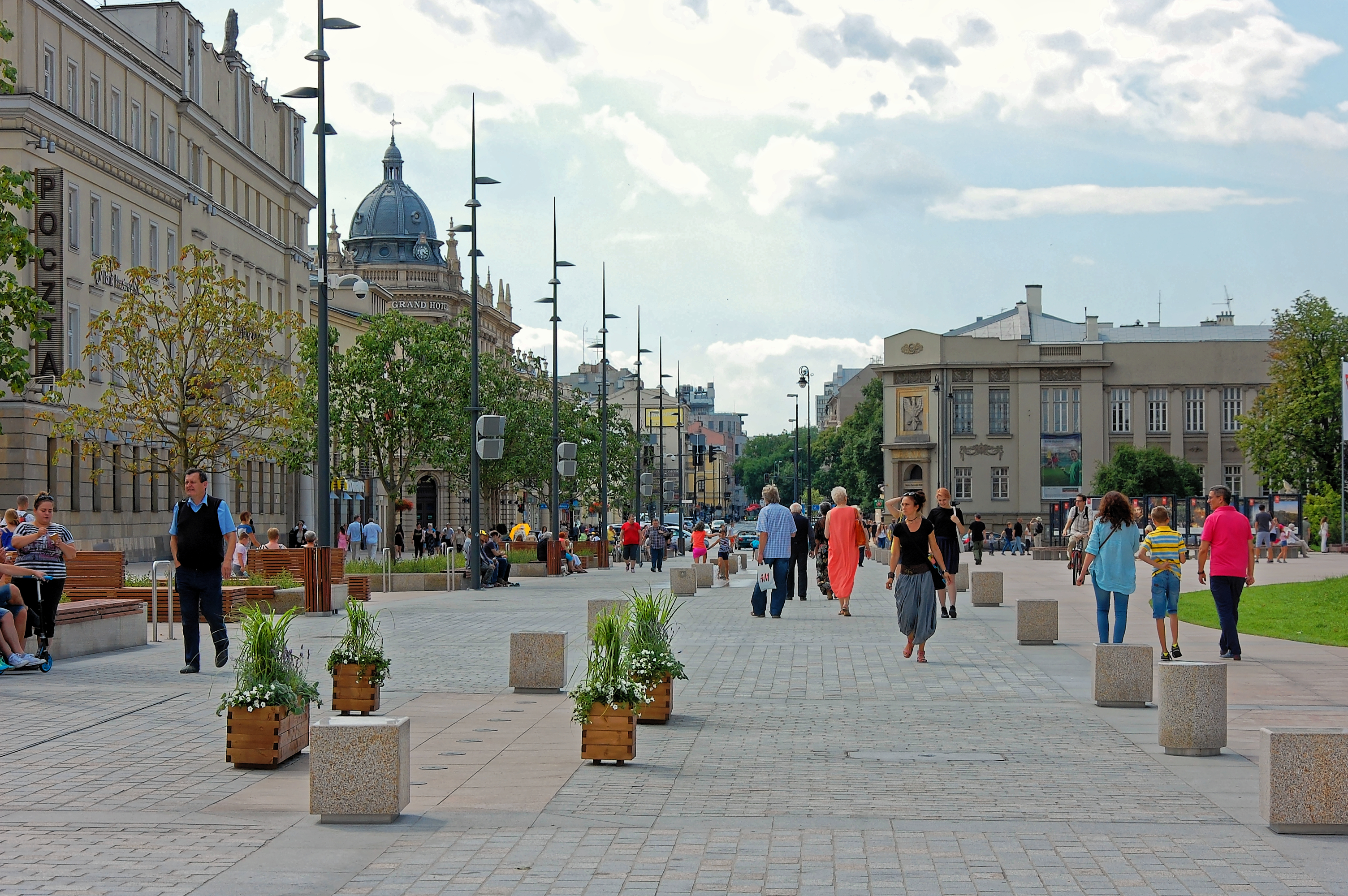
Litewski Square, 2017

Litewski Square (Lithuanian Square) is a square in the center of Lublin, Poland, with an area of about 35 thousand square meters, created in the 1820s to hold military parades. Originally named Drill Square. Litewski Square is the central place in Lublin, where state ceremonies, happenings and other events take place. It is listed in the Register of Historical Monuments under the number A/588 and was entered into the register on 10 April 1972.

== History ==
=== Until 1918 ===
In the 16th century, a road leading through the present-day square led to a bridge on the Czechówka River, leading further to the route to Warsaw. At that time the land belonged to the Radziwiłł family. In the 17th century it became the property of Józef Karol Lubomirski and later his daughter Maria Anna, the wife of Paweł Karol Sanguszko. After the Sanguszkos, the Szepetycki family owned the square, and in 1801, at a public auction, Beniamin Finke bought it and donated it to the government.

Until 1818, the area where Litewski Square is located was used as a straw warehouse. In 1819, the hospital and the Church of the Brothers of St. John of God, which had been built in the mid-18th century, were demolished. In 1823, Jan Stompf thoroughly rebuilt the square and the Radziwiłł Palace, which was to become the seat of the Lublin Province Commission. The resulting square was about 2 hectares in size and was named "Drill Square". On part of it, on an earthy hill, a new monument of the Lublin Union was erected. According to tradition, in 1569 the Polish and Lithuanian nobility met in this place before the union of both countries was signed. This event was commemorated by a brick obelisk, which was destroyed during the demolition of the Church of St. John of God. Permission to erect a new monument was obtained from the tsarist authorities in 1826 by Rev. Stanisław Staszic. The classical relief depicting Poland and Lithuania was designed by Paweł Maliński. The obelisk itself was cast in iron.

Later, in 1873-1876, the tsarist authorities ordered the erection of the Elevation of the Holy Cross Orthodox Church on the square in place of the present fountain. This building, architecturally alien to the landscape of Lublin, received a five-domed main body and a tall tower, where a bell from St. Michael's Church, demolished in 1852, was placed. When Lublin was occupied by the Austrians, the church was adapted as a garrison church, and the buildings around the square became the seat of the authorities of the General Government. In 1916, to commemorate the 125th anniversary of the Constitution of 3 May 1791, a memorial stone was placed in the square.

Around 1880, to commemorate the January Uprising, a "tree of freedom" was planted in the square - a black poplar, later named "baobab".

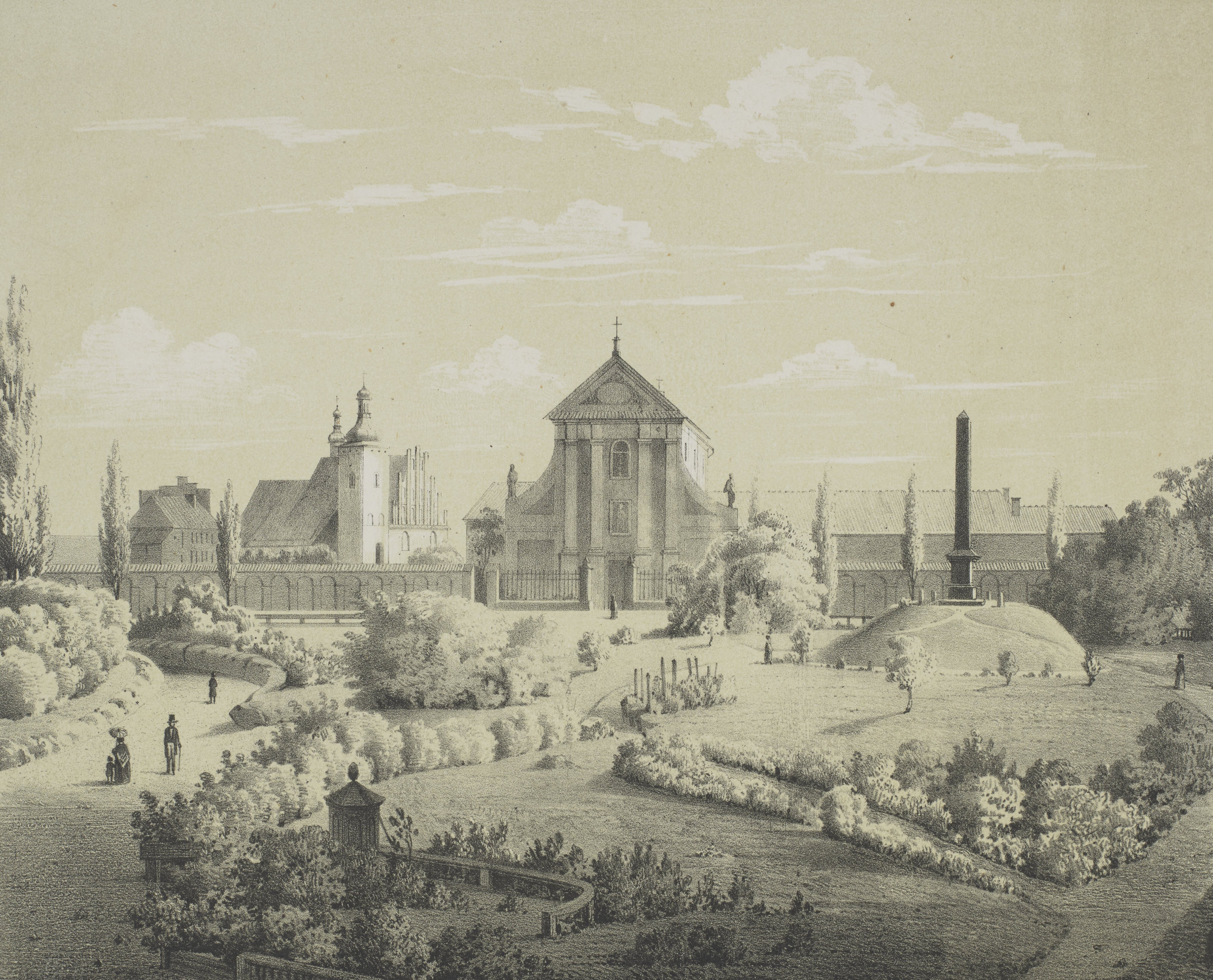
The Church of the Visitation, the Capuchins' Church and the Lublin Union Monument circa 1860, lithography by Adam Lerue

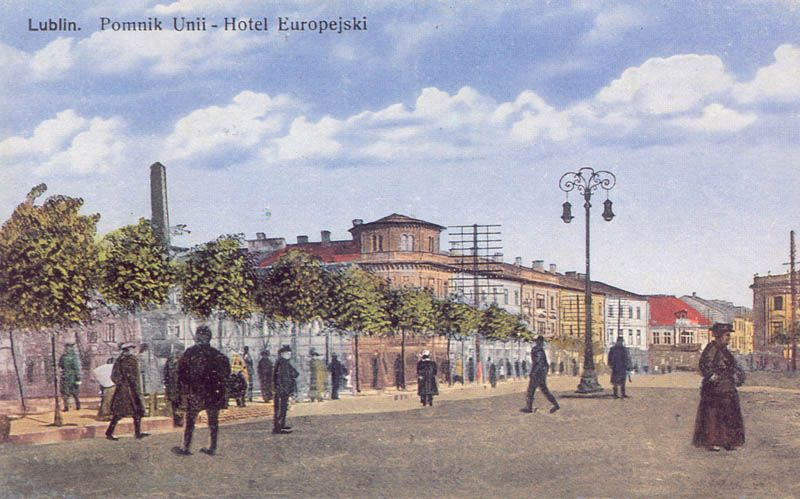
Litewski Square on a postcard from the early 20th century

=== 1918–1989 ===
In 1918 the events connected with seizing power from Austrians and forming the Provisional People's Government of the Republic of Poland took place in and around the Litewski Square. Until November 2, the Radziwiłł Palace was the residence of the governor, and on November 7 it became the seat of Ignacy Daszyński's cabinet and hosted the first meeting of the government. The building of the former State Bank, which housed the officers' club, became a meeting place for officers, and decisions were made there about taking power from the occupant. During the night of November 6-7, in the building of the now defunct "Wiktoria" hotel, activists of the Polish Military Organisation interned officers connected with the Regency Council of the Kingdom of Poland, and on the opposite side of the square, at Niecała Street, Juliusz Zdanowski, a commissioner of the Regency Council in Lublin.

In 1925 the Orthodox Church was demolished. During the Second Polish Republic the square bore its present name. During the occupation the name of the square was changed to "Adolf Hitler-Platz". In 1945 the Monument of Gratitude to the Soviet Army was built, depicting a soldier with an unfurled flag. In the 1950s, after Stalin's death, the square was renamed "Joseph Stalin Square". In 1974, the Unknown Soldier plaque was installed, and in 1981 a monument was erected to commemorate the 190th anniversary of the Constitution of 3 May 1791.

== Since 1989 ==
=== 1989–2010 ===
By 2009, the square had undergone only cosmetic changes, estimated at 850,000 PLN. In 1990 the "baobab" gained the status of a natural monument. In the 1990s the Monument of Gratitude to the Soviet Army was dismantled. In 2001 the monument of Marshal Piłsudski was unveiled. "Baobad" begun to die out at the beginning of the 21st century.

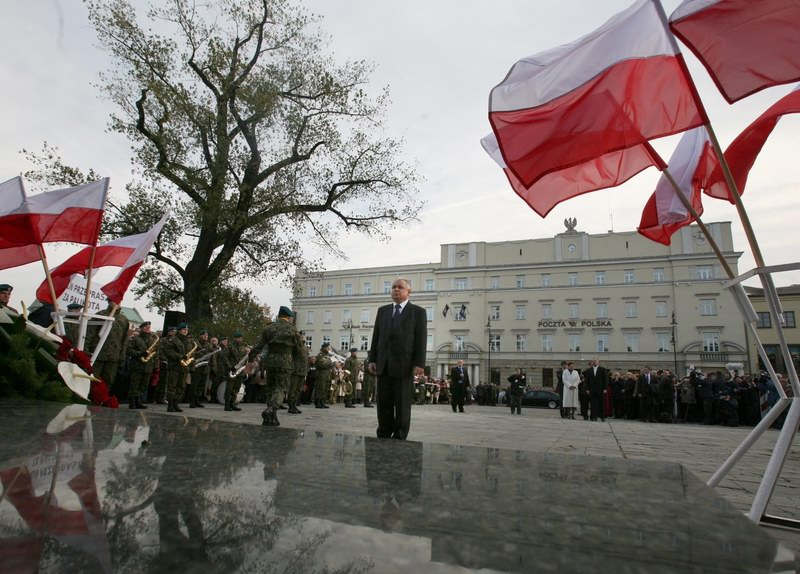
Visit of the President of the Republic of Poland Lech Kaczyński in Lublin. Litewski Square, Polish Post Office building and the baobab tree in the background, 2008.

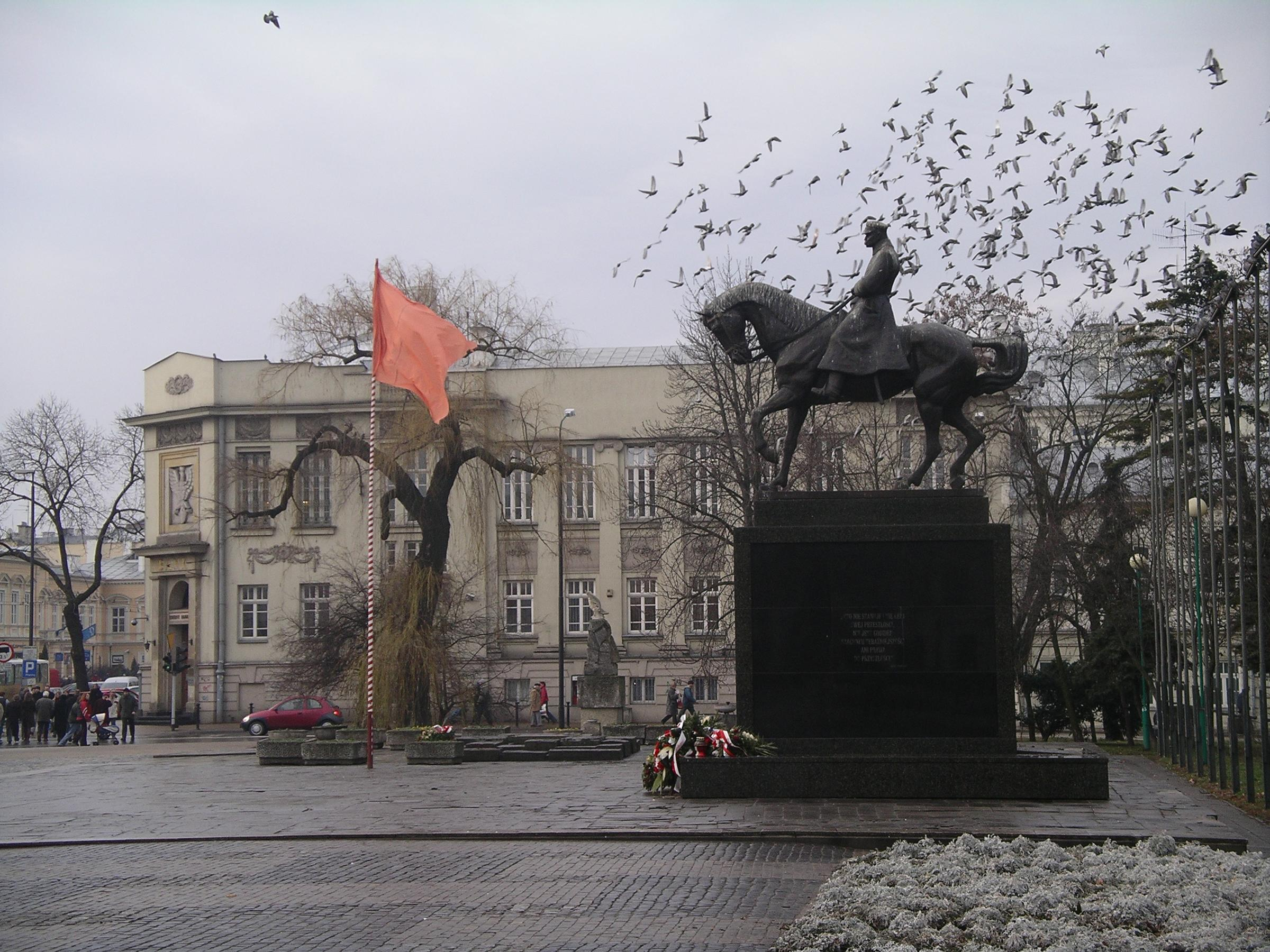
The monument to J. Piłsudski. Next to it the flag of the Orange Revolution, 2005.

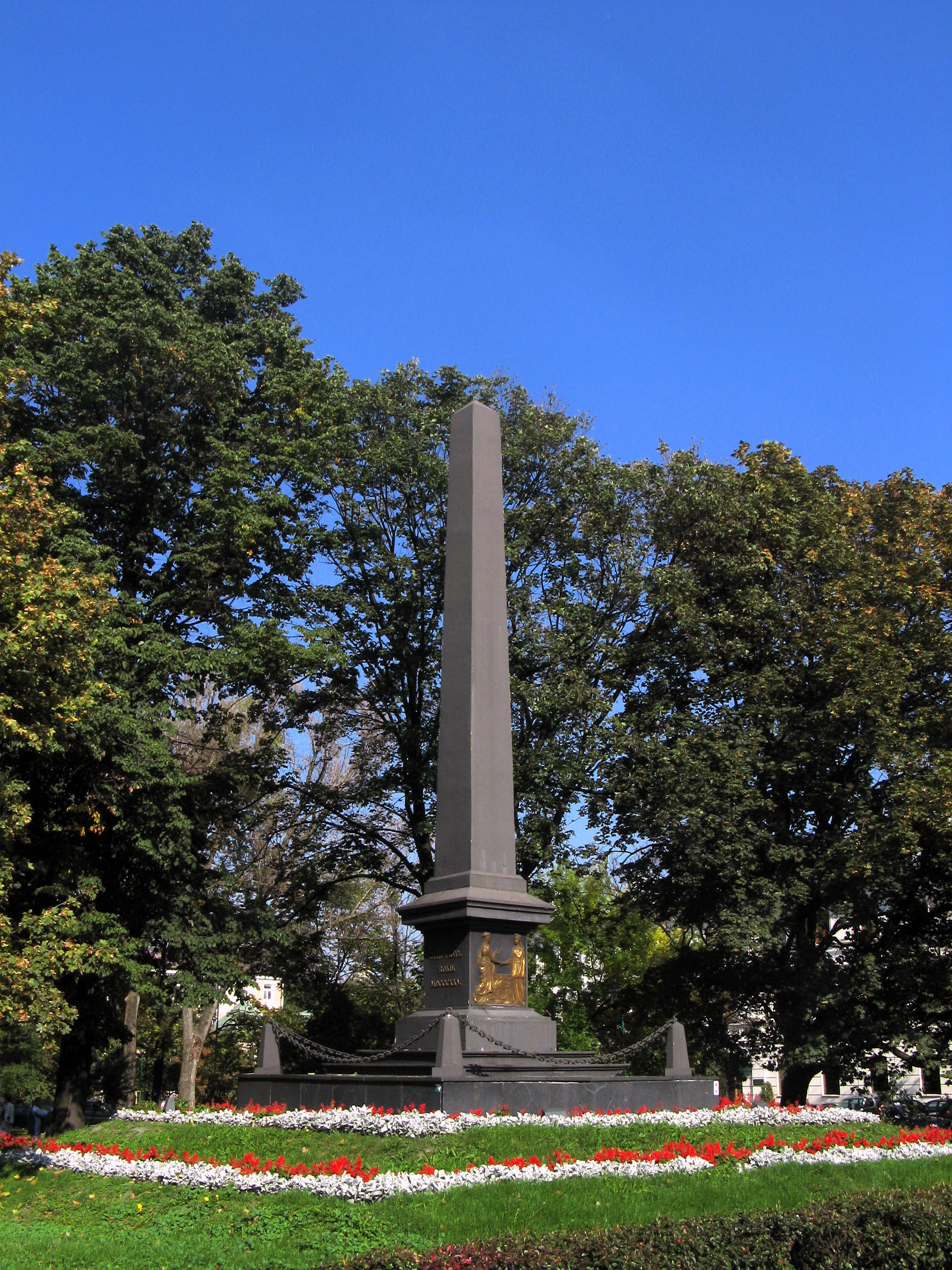
Lublin Union Monument, 2007.

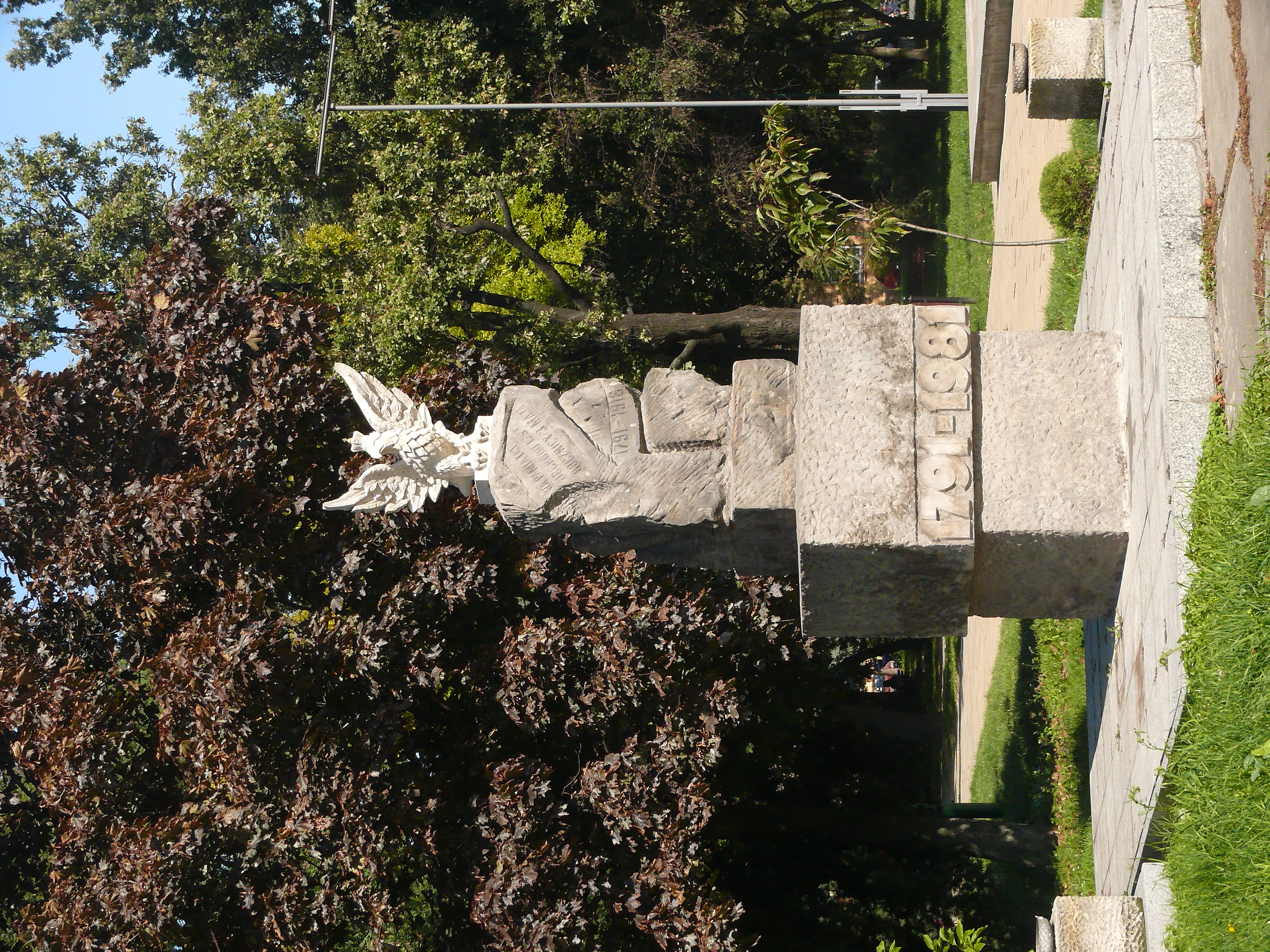
Monument to the Constitution of 3 May 1791, 2012.

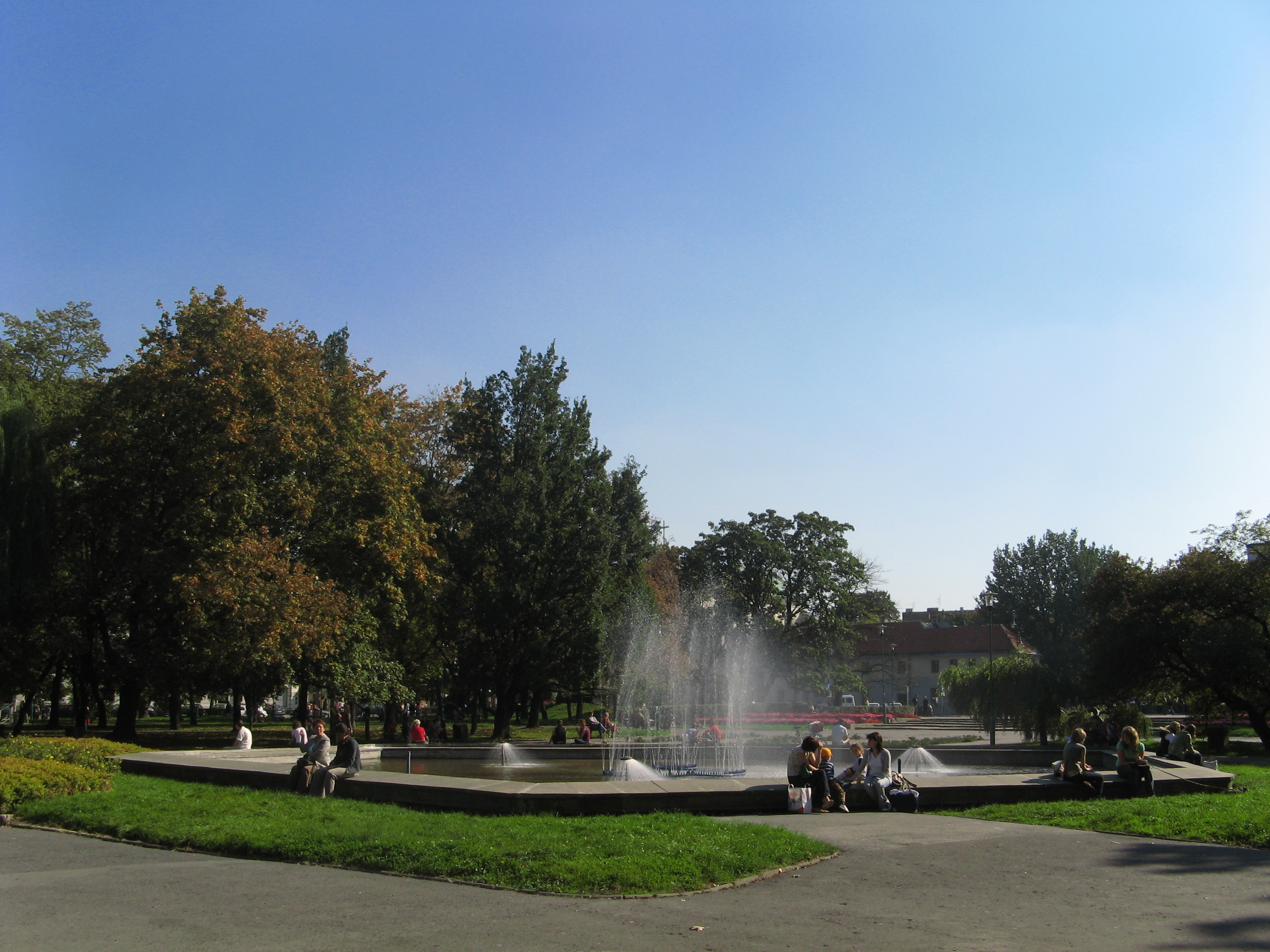
Fountain, 2007.

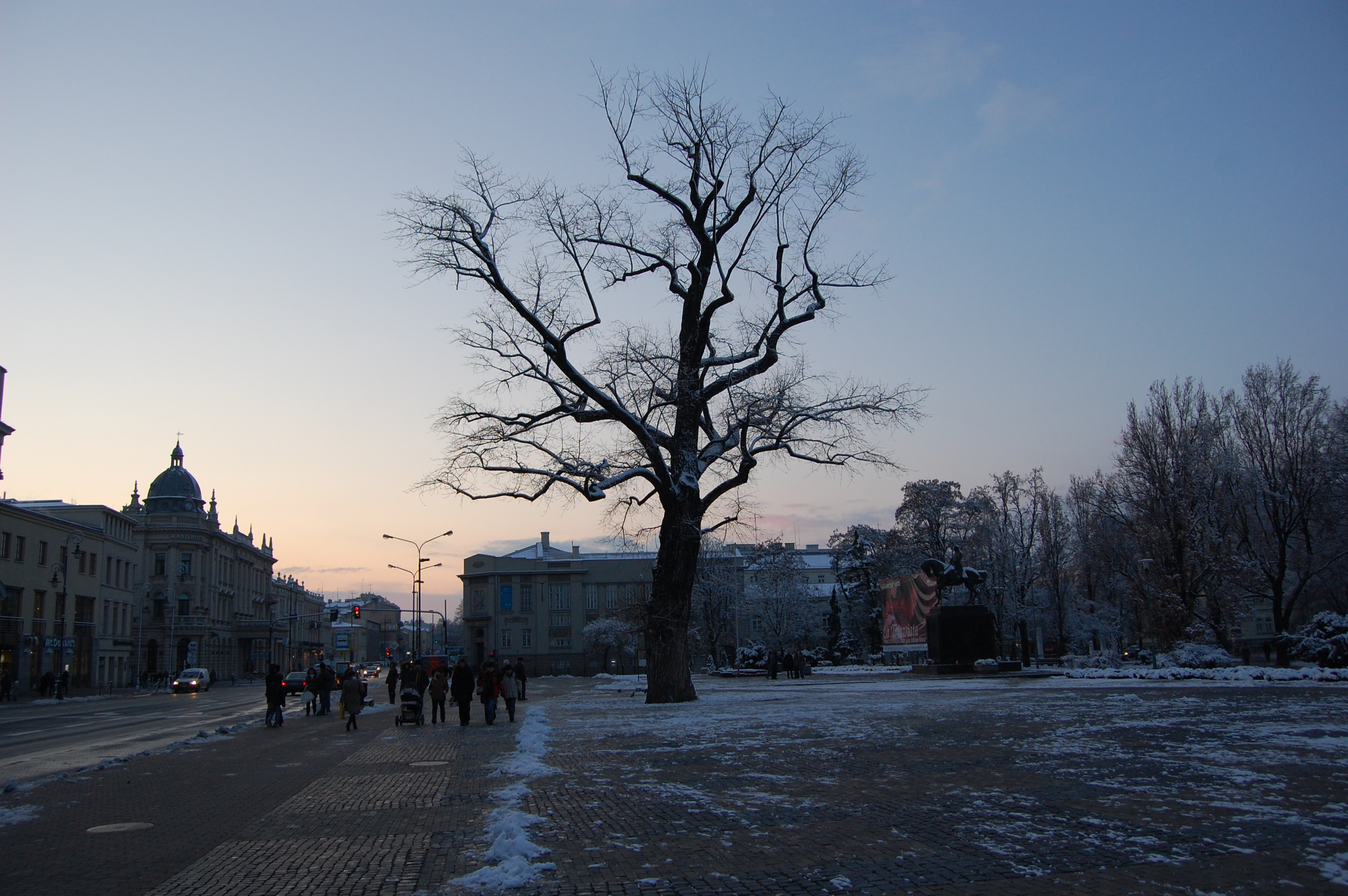
Black poplar called "baobab", 2008.

=== Since 2010 ===
In July 2010, Lublin authorities announced a call for proposals to revitalize the Litewski Square. Redevelopment plans were based on the assumption that the square would be a space mainly for pedestrians. According to this plan, the pedestrian zone of Krakowskie Przedmieście was to be extended to Kołłątaja Street and the street by the Europa Hotel was to be closed. The possibility of using the buildings of Maria Curie-Skłodowska University for public purposes and moving the meteorological station located there was taken into consideration.

In 2013, a reconstruction concept was adopted, taking into account plans developed 3 years earlier. It was expected that the investment would be completed in 2014 and would amount to about 30 million PLN. The deadlines were postponed. The plans from October 2014 set the start date of reconstruction for spring 2015, the cost was estimated at 62 million PLN. The tender was announced a year later and the completion date was set for spring 2017.

The reconstruction of the square began in April 2016. The basic idea was to extend the promenade to the intersection with Kołłątaja Street (elimination of vehicular traffic on this section). During the works, the Orthodox Church's foundations were secured and remnants of old routes and buildings were discovered. Spatial layout of the square was preserved. The historical route leading in the direction of Wieniawa was reconstructed. Changes were made to the surface, layout of green areas and planting, the fountain, illumination of buildings surrounding the square, and monuments. The old fountain was removed and a new one was built, including a complex of water devices with a five-meter-high dyke and Europe's most modern five-function control system (water, light, sound, lasers, and an image projected on the facade of the post office building). Mieczysław Albert Krąpc and Józef Czechowicz squares were revitalized. The redeveloped Litewski Square became available to the public in June 2017.

In 2017, after a branch of the "baobab" broke off, a decision was made to remove the tree.

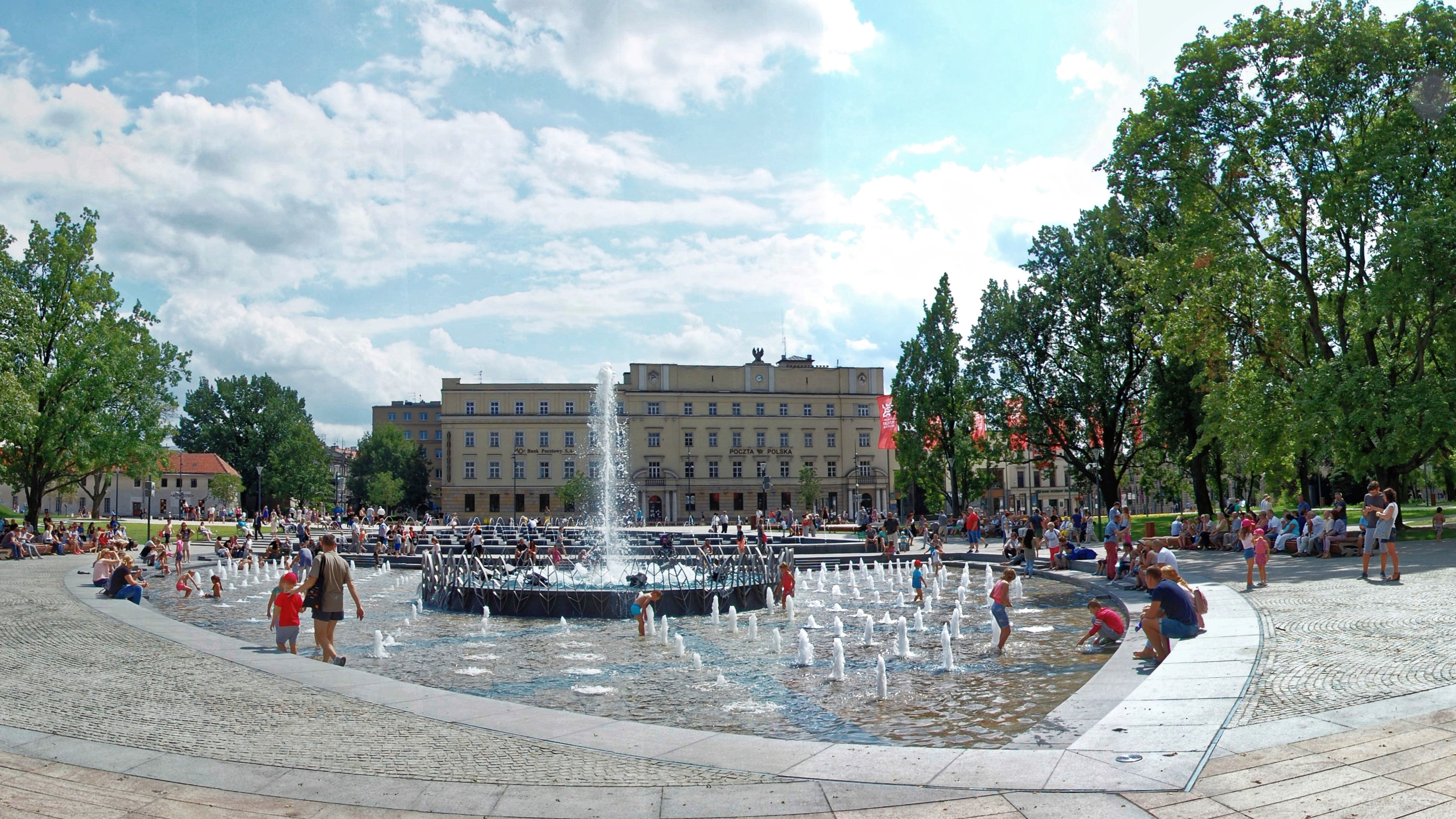
Multimedia fountain and the Polish Post Office building

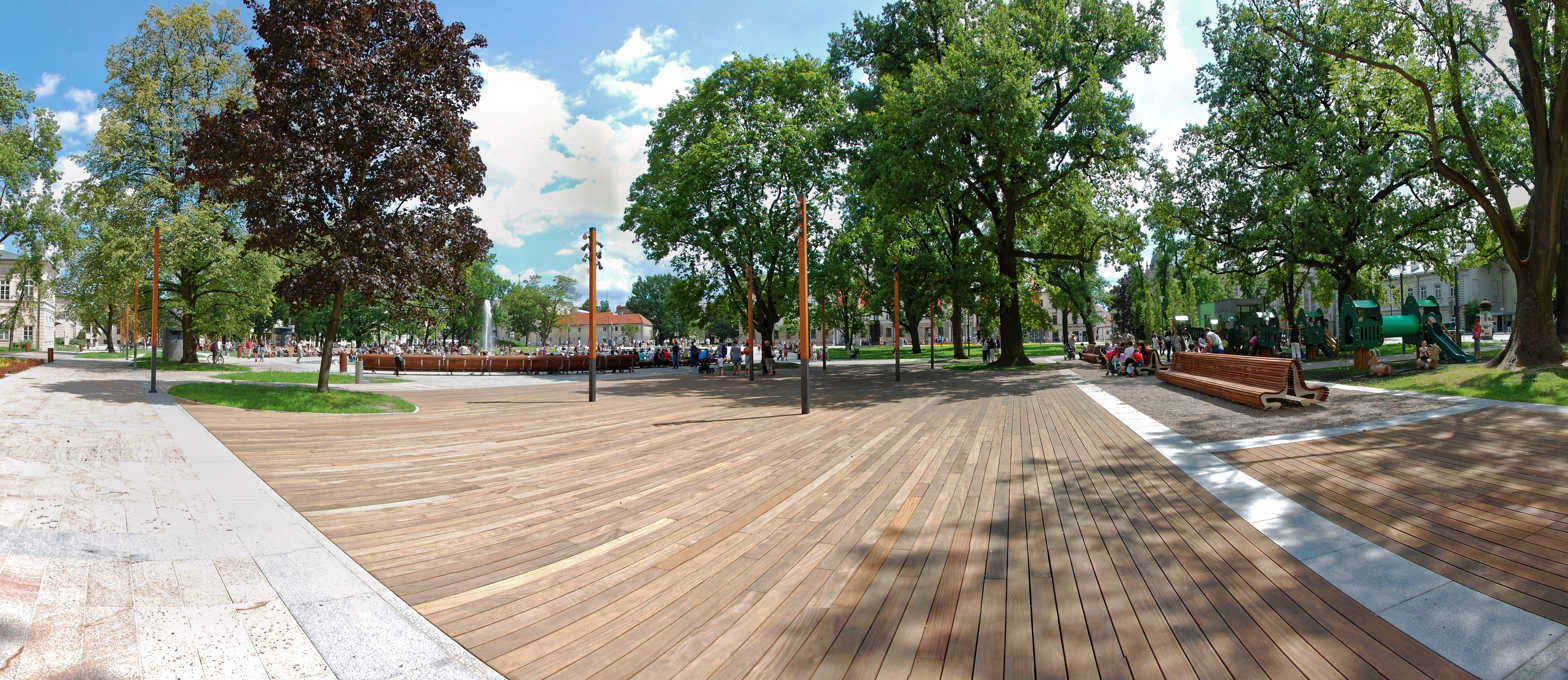
Part of the square with a wooden surface for dancing

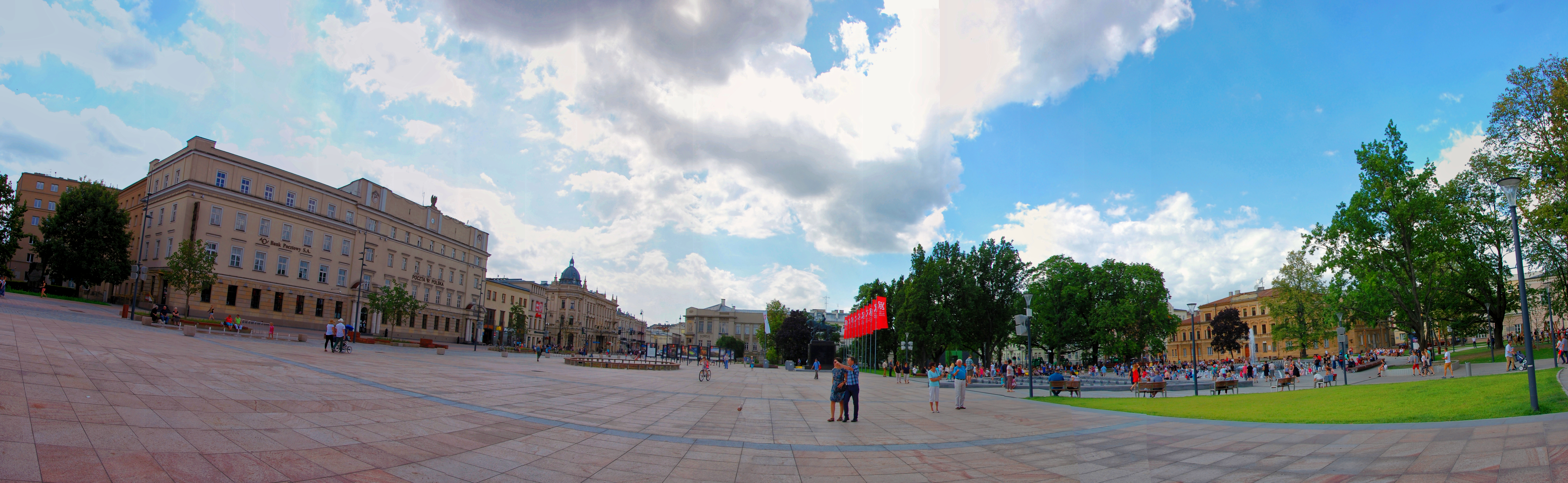
Panorama of the square

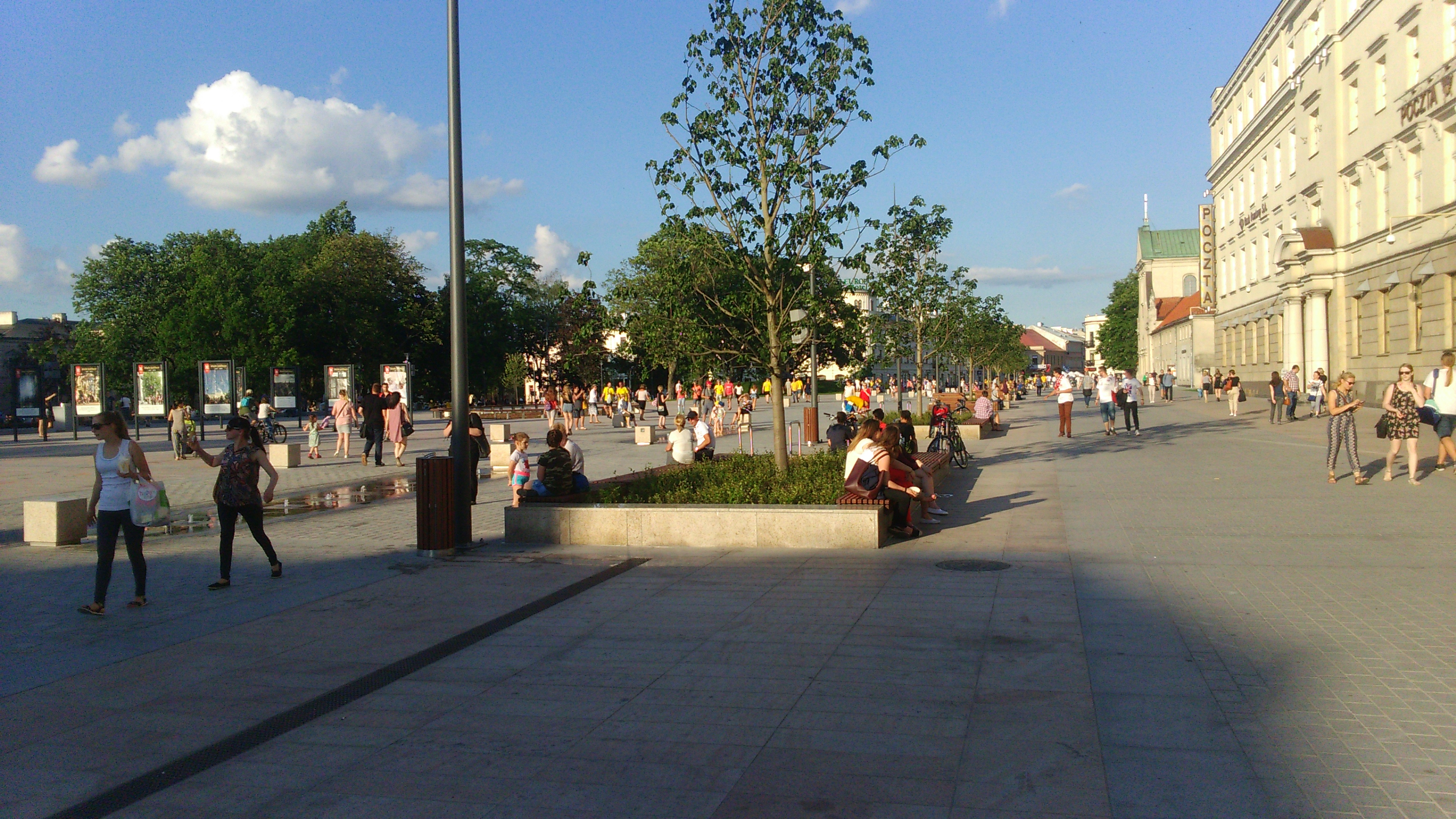
View from Kołłątaja St.

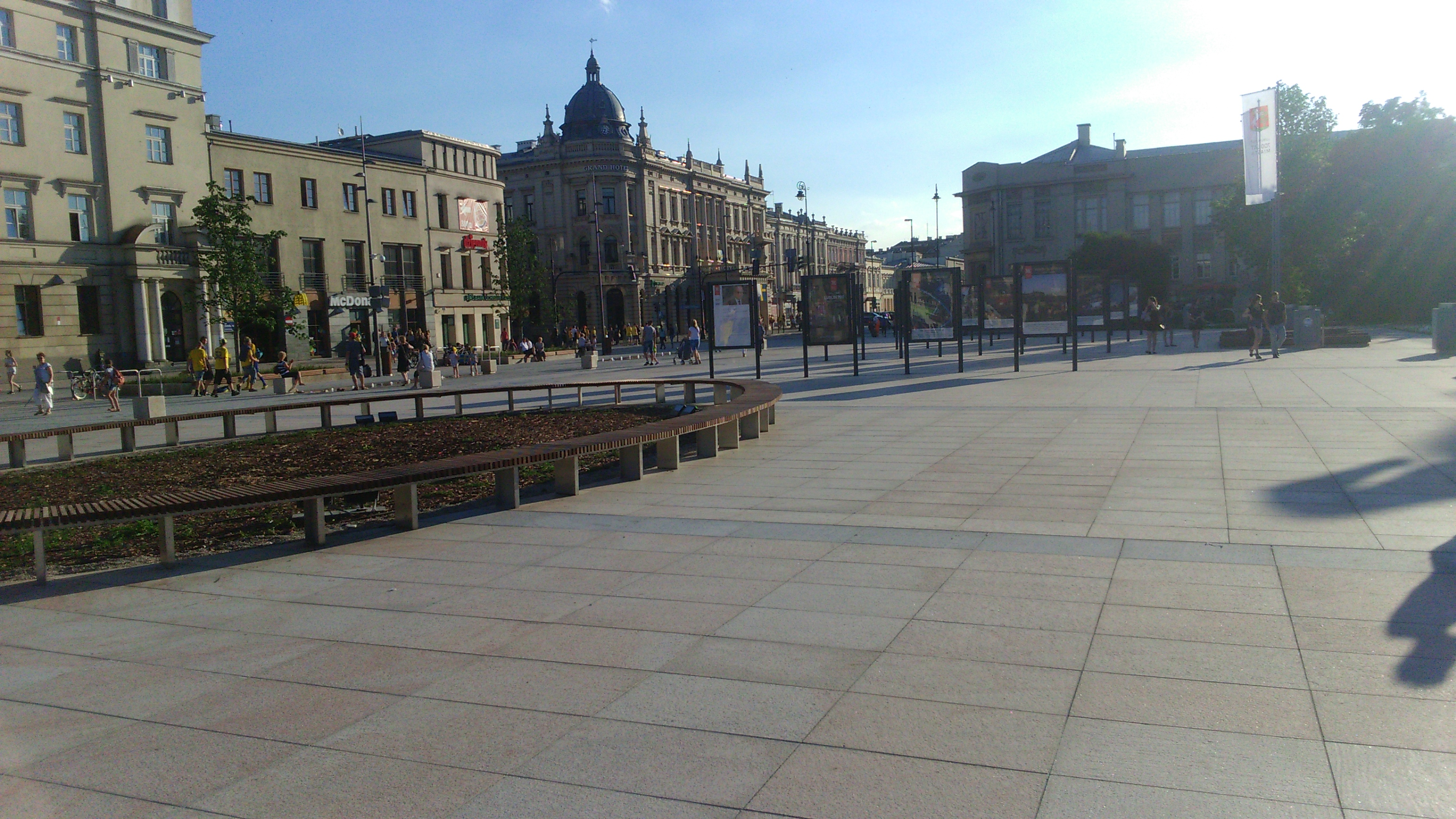
View from the Old Town

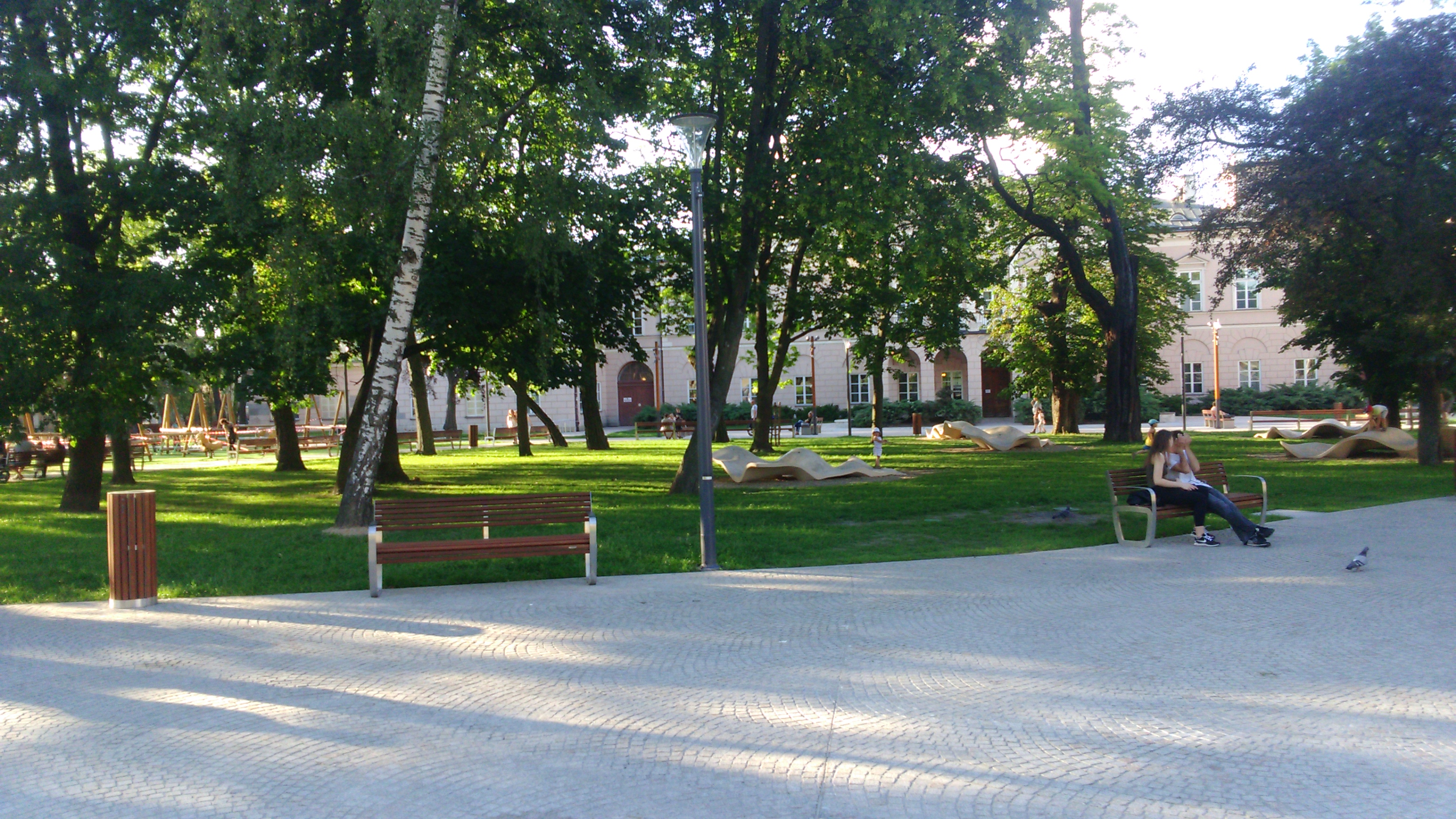
Lubomirski Palace in the background

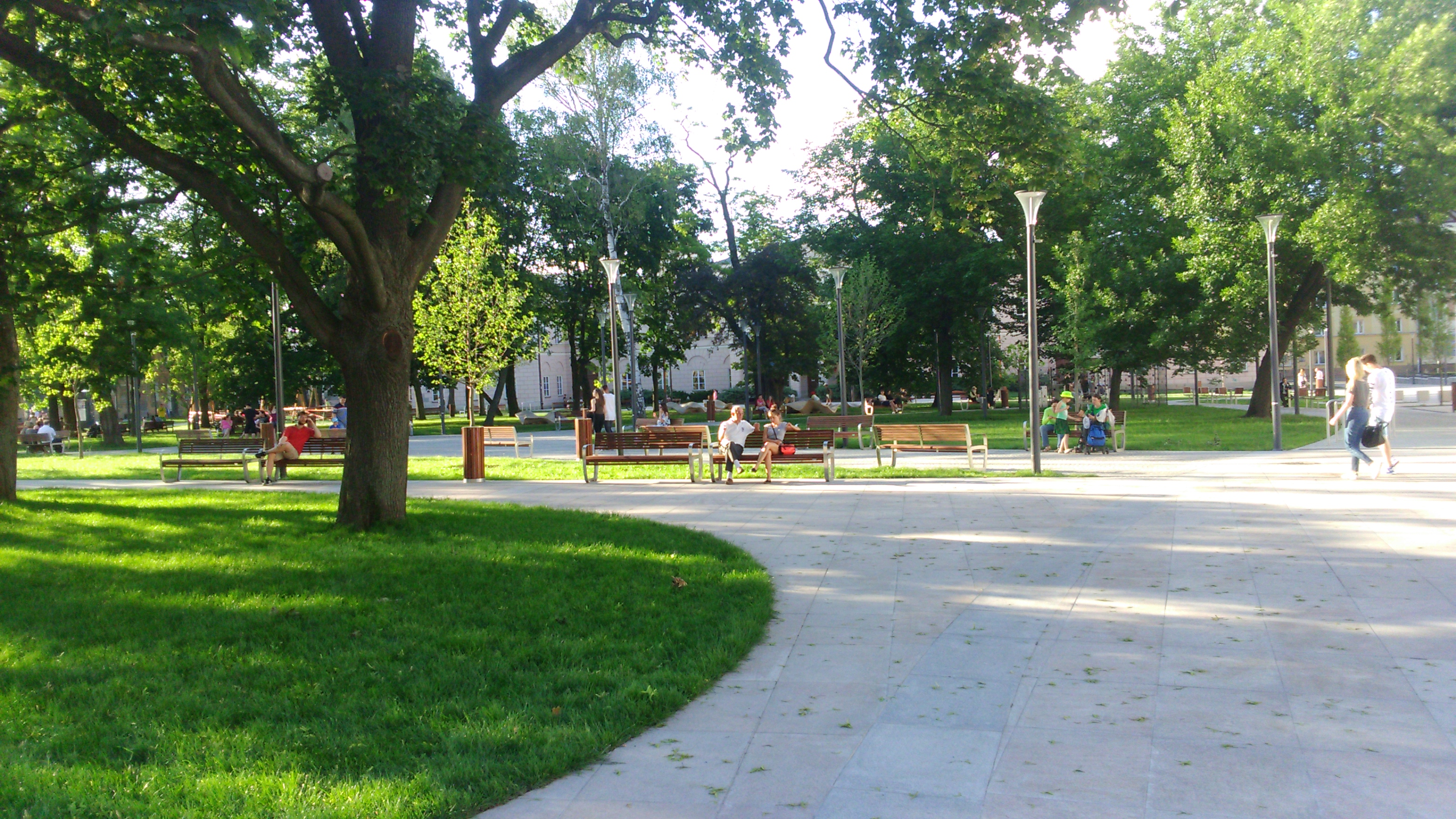
Lubomirski Palace in the background

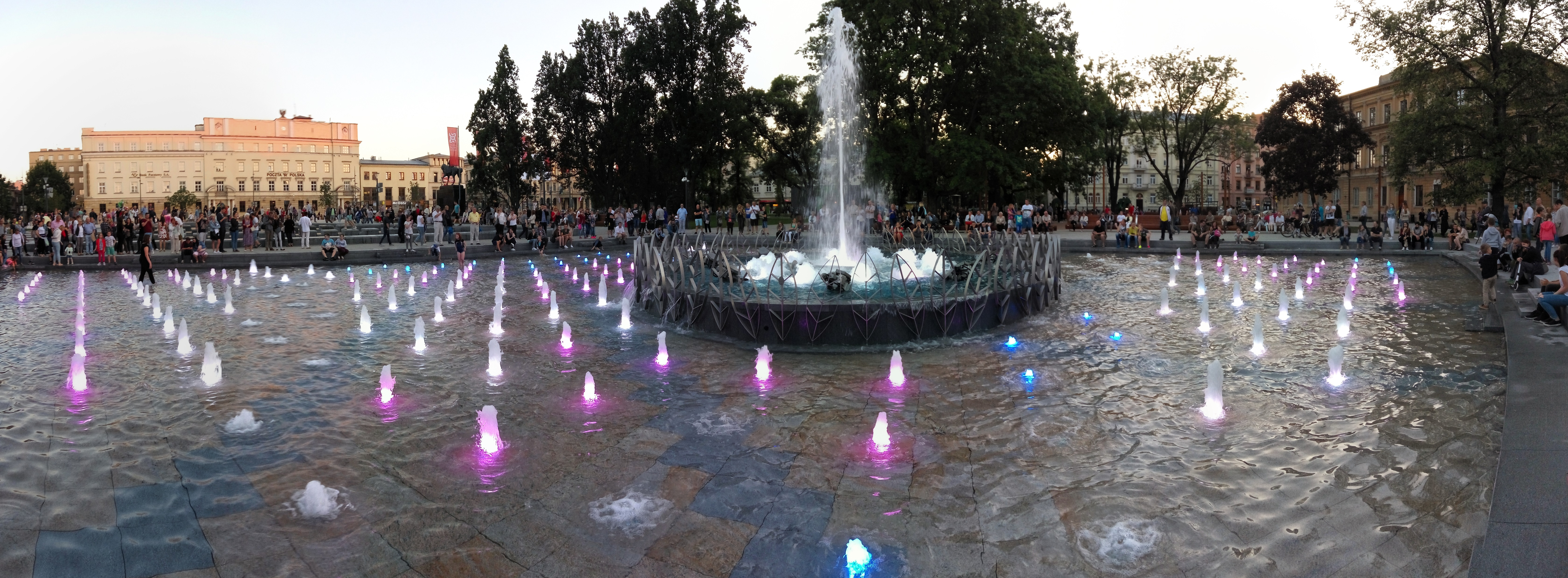
Multimedia fountain

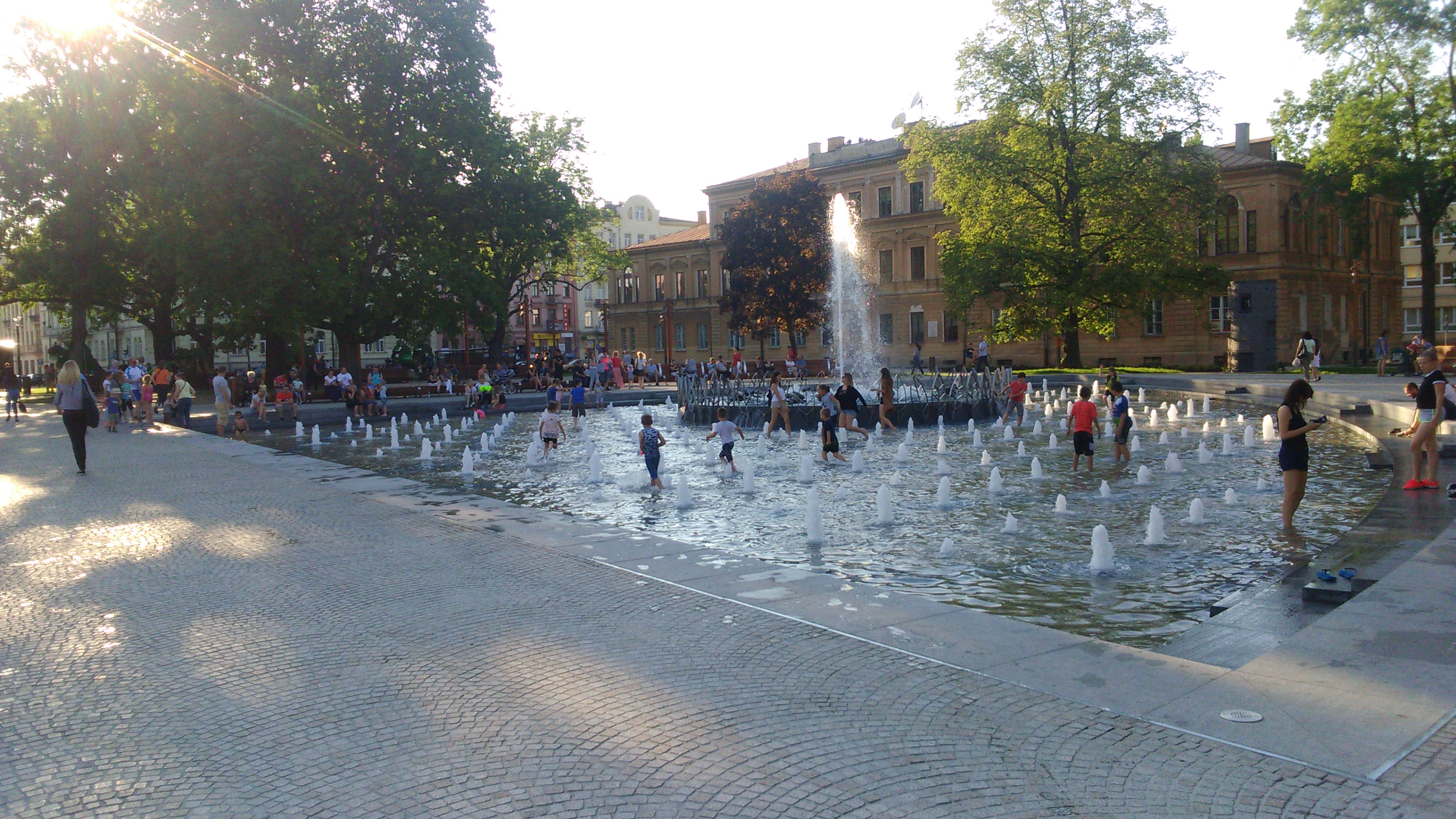
Fountain, Governor's Palace in the background
