= Józef Łobodowski =

Polish poet and political thinker (1909–1988)

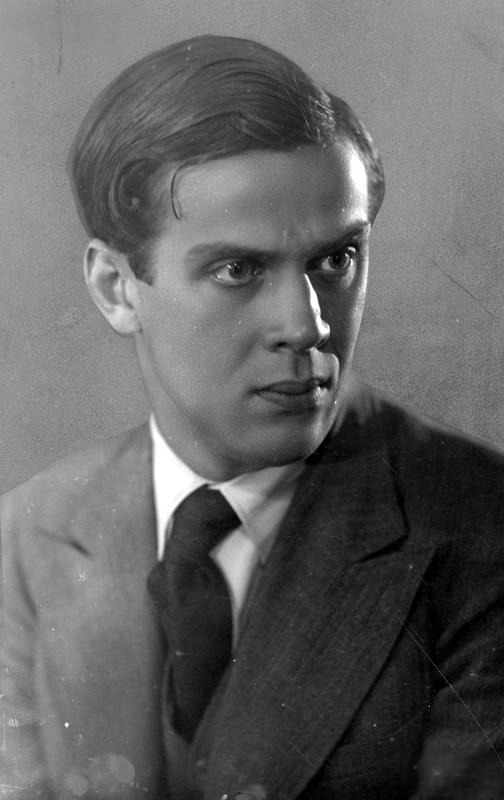
- Łobodowski in 1938
- Born: 19 March 1909; Purwiszki, Partitioned Poland
- Died: 18 April 1988 (aged 79); Madrid, Spain
- Occupations: Poet, dramatist, writer, translator, magazine editor, opinion journalist, radio personality
- Spouse: Jadwiga Laura Zofia Kuryłło (Marriage: 1938-03-01, Divorce: 1950-04-09)
- Relatives: Władysława Łobodowska (b. 1905; married name (from 1927), Tomanek or Tomankowa; sister); Adam Tomanek (b. 1928; nephew)
- Writing career
- Pen name: Stefan Kuryłło; Łoboda; Iosif Władisławowicz Łobodowskij; Paragraf
- Period: Interbellum; Ciemne dziesięciolecie ("Dark Decade"; 1928–1939); Second World War; Post-War period
- Genres: Catastrophism (katastrofizm); Neo-romanticism; Lyric poetry Ghazal; Qasida; Bagatelle (fraszka); Satirical poetry
- Notable works: Rozmowa z ojczyzną ("A Conversation with the Fatherland"; 1935); Demonom nocy ("To the Demons of the Night"; 1936)
- Notable awards: Youth Prize of the Polish Academy of Literature (1937)
- Movements: Skamander; The Second Avant-garde (Druga Awangarda)

Józef Stanisław Łobodowski (Polish pronunciation: [ˈjuzɛf wɔbɔˈdɔfskʲi]) (19 March 1909 – 18 April 1988) was a Polish poet and political thinker.

His poetic works are broadly divided into two distinct phases: the earlier one, until about 1934, in which he was sometimes identified as "the last of the Skamandrites", and the second phase beginning about 1935, marked by the pessimistic and tragic colouring associated with the newly nascent current in Polish poetry known as katastrofizm (catastrophism). The evolution of his political thought, from the radical left to staunch anticommunism, broadly paralleled the trajectory of his poetic oeuvre.

To the contemporary reading public Łobodowski was also known as the founder and editor of several avant-garde literary periodicals, of a newspaper, translator, novelist, prose writer in the Polish and Spanish languages, radio personality, and preeminently a prolific opinion writer with sharply defined political views active before, during and after the Second World War in the Polish press (since 1940 only in the émigré press). Łobodowski described himself as a Ukrainophile and devoted three of his books to Ukrainian themes, including two collections of poetry (Pieśń o Ukrainie and Złota hramota). He spoke out in defence of ethnic minorities in Poland before and after the Second World War, condemning for example the forced resettlement of the Lemko community in the so-called Operation Vistula mounted by the communist régime in 1947, or the destruction of churches built in the Eastern Orthodox architectural style out of favour in the Western-oriented Poland of the Interbellum. He denounced in print the anti-Jewish sentiment prevalent in some Polish literary circles before the War, defending for example the Polish poet Franciszka Arnsztajnowa against antisemitic attacks. An inveterate and caustic critic of totalitarianism in all its forms (except fascism), he was blacklisted by the communist censorship of the post-War Poland and spent most of his life in exile in Spain.

== Life and work ==
=== Early life ===
Łobodowski was born on 19 March 1909 in the lands of Partitioned Poland on the Purwiszki farmstead of his father, Władysław Łobodowski, a colonel in the Imperial Russian Army, and his wife Stefanja Łobodowska, née Doborejko-Jarząbkiewicz. Of the Łobodowskis' four children — three daughters and one son — two daughters died in childhood, leaving Józef and his surviving (elder) sister Władysława. In 1910 the Łobodowskis were obliged to sell their country estate and moved to Lublin. In 1914, owing to the outbreak of the First World War, Władysław Łobodowski was transferred together with his family to Moscow as a measure taken by the Imperial Russian Army to shield its officer corps from the hostilities of war. It is to this period of his early schooling in Moscow that Łobodowski owed his excellent knowledge of the Russian language. However, the upheavals of the Bolshevik Revolution of 1917 soon forced the family to flee for their lives to Yeysk in the Kuban region of the Ciscaucasia, where — drastically reduced in their means — they suffered severe privations for five years, including hunger. In this place and in these conditions Łobodowski passed the formative years of his life between the ages of 8 and 13, at times forced by circumstances into wheeling and dealing in the town's streets to help the family survive. The name "Kuban", as a reference to the broadly conceived world of the Kuban Cossacks, crops up in all discussions of Łobodowski's life and creative oeuvre as the single most significant toponym of his entire biography. The Kuban period will be fictionalized in his 1955 novel Komysze ("The Bushmen"), a text which paints a faithful and seductively vivid picture of the last months of freedom and decadence in Russia in a secluded port in the Zakubanskie Marshes on the Sea of Azov. It is also here, in the Kuban, that Łobodowski first came in contact with Ukrainian culture, owing to the presence in the region of the Zaporozhian Cossacks who had been resettled there after the banning of the Zaporizhian Sich by Catherine II in 1775. However, the Kuban, and Yeysk in particular did not prove a safe haven for the family, and here his father, Władysław Łobodowski, was at last arrested by the Bolsheviks: although eventually released through the intervention of a former comrade-in-arms from the Imperial Russian Army who had crossed over the new ideological divide, he died there of natural causes on 4 March 1922 and is buried in town. Thereupon Łobodowski's mother, Stefanja Łobodowska, decided to take her three surviving children (one daughter had already died earlier) to the nascent Second Polish Republic, a long and perilous journey which claimed the life of another of her children, a second daughter, hurriedly buried along the way in an unmarked grave. Thus reduced in numbers and deprived of means of support, the family settled once again in Lublin, in an establishment owned by Stefanja Łobodowska's stepsister, Łobodowski's aunt.

=== Youth and the early period as a poet ===
The city of Lublin (now in independent Poland) was thus to become the centre of his youth, and here Łobodowski spent his tumultuous high-school years which saw his first forays into poetry, encouraged by the poet Julian Tuwim, soon to become the dominant preoccupation of his life. In the first years of his life as a poet his sympathies lay with the so-called Second Avant-garde (Druga Awangarda) movement centred round the poet Józef Czechowicz and his circle, whose style was characterized by visionary catastrophism mediated by Expressionism, although the personal idiom Łobodowski developed was distinctively and unmistakably his own. One of the first compositions published by Łobodowski was the poem "Dlaczego" (Why?) which appeared in May 1928 in the bimonthly magazine W Słońce which he co-edited and which also carried in its first issue the article of a 19-year-old Łobodowski on the nature of poetry in general as the art of the unsayable, and some other of his poems. His début in book form in 1929, at the age of 20, was the collection of poems entitled Słońce przez szpary ("Sunshine through the Cracks"). This was followed by the volume entitled Gwiezdny psałterz ("Astral Psaltery") released in the autumn of 1931, whose programmatic poem "Poezja" (Poetry) is dedicated to Julian Tuwim in obvious acknowledgement of his indebtedness to the Skamander circle. However, another poem in the collection, "Hymn brzucha" (The Hymn of the Belly), in which reverberate the echos of the terrible period of hunger experienced in Yeysk in 1917–1922, will mark the beginning, stylistically, of a post-Skamander stage in Łobodowski's creative journey. These early volumes largely escaped the notice of the literary establishment at the time.

==== On the Red Colour of Blood and other colours ====
Łobodowski began to draw attention with his third collection of poetry on account of the controversy it caused. The controversy stemmed principally from the fact that the newly independent Poland was not a fully democratic country with unfettered freedom of speech, but constituted instead an environment in which the ostensibly "leftist" ideology he espoused early in his life as a vehicle for his nonconformist ideas was treated with suspicion. The entire print run of O czerwonej krwi ("On the Red Colour of Blood"), his third collection of poems published in January 1932 expressing revolt against the prevailing standards of morality and challenging all authority, was seized by the authorities and criminal proceedings were instituted against Łobodowski as the author. Although the protracted court case ended, on appeal, with mere confiscation of all the copies of the book and no fines or imprisonment were imposed, the affair had damaging consequences for Łobodowski since — as it coincided with the commencement of his studies in the Faculty of Law of the Catholic University of Lublin in 1931 — he was promptly expelled from the university in February 1932, at the beginning of the second semester of the first year and, for good measure, blacklisted by all institutions of higher education in Poland "for the propagation of pornography and blasphemy through poetical works".

Łobodowski responded defiantly by releasing another collection of poetry later the same year under the title W przeddzień ("On the Eve"), his fourth book which included the title poem "W przeddzień" (On the Eve) incorporating the following three lines addressed to the Polish dictator First Marshal Piłsudski (who had earlier called his coup d'état a "revolution", and who is referenced in the poem by name):

towarzyszu Piłsudski,
w przeddzień polskiej rewolucji
krwią wasze imię wypisujemy na tarczach...
_________________________________

Comrade Piłsudski,
on the eve of the Polish Revolution,
we inscribe your name in blood upon our armoury of battle...

(emphasis in the original).

This book, which appeared towards the end of June 1932 in a print run of 100 copies, was placed under an interdict by the local authorities in Lublin on 2 July 1932; the interdict was however lifted by the decision of the Lublin district court just eleven days later. The authorities evidently considered it wise to ignore the challenge this time round to avoid giving Łobodowski the benefit of extra publicity, his star having risen markedly since he had been stamped with the hallmark of a "confiscated poet" the last time. Indeed, thrust into the public spotlight with the O czerwonej krwi affair of March 1932, with his books suddenly an object of attention, Łobodowski started billing his previously released (but unsold) volume Gwiezdny psałterz as now still forthcoming in newspaper notices intended to capitalize on the newly found wave of popularity with this title, too. On the other hand, the individual poem entitled "Słowo do prokuratora" (A Word to the Prosecutor), published separately in the Trybuna in March 1932, a literary journal of which he was for a time the editor-in-chief, will be the cause of another court case against him in 1933. This time in addition to the usual charges of subversive publications will be added the charges of contacts with the Communist Party of Poland: Łobodowski will be acquitted only on appeal in a Warsaw court in October 1933. For all the exertions of the Sanacja régime against him as a communist subversive, Łobodowski's leftist stance was to a significant extent superficial, adopted as an expedient by an angry young man to transmit his ideas of rebellion against reality, tout court (and was soon to be abandoned of his own accord for other forms of poetic discourse better suited to his evolving perception of human condition). Some critics have used the adjective światoburczy to describe the nature of Łobodowski's political writings, a partly jocose word whose meaning is a blend of such concepts as iconoclasm, radicalism, and dissatisfaction with the status quo (welterschütternd in German). The evidence of how seriously Łobodowski was taken as a political commentator at this time can on the other hand be illustrated by the fact that, at the age of 23, he could print opinion pieces on the first page of the premier daily newspaper of a major Polish city (the Kurjer Lubelski of Lublin) with such headlines as "What You Need is a Suicide" (a title he used in an article stressing the need for the Polish society to free itself from the old entrenched modes of thought). There is evidence that Łobodowski, even at this particular period of his life, held in contempt those who — like Jerzy Putrament — admired him for his leftist leanings rather than his poetical craftsmanship. Józef Czechowicz, the leading light of the Lublin avant-garde, went so far (in a private letter) as to express the opinion that Łobodowski deliberately fostered around himself an atmosphere of sensation and scandal in which to move his wings, and that not only in the political sphere but in the literary and social domains as well. Despite the wide publicity his first four volumes of poetry had received, Łobodowski himself considered his output up to this point "unoriginal". Łobodowski was twice the editor-in-chief of the Kurjer Lubelski, one of the most important daily newspapers of the interbellum Poland, in 1932 and 1937. Upon assuming the office of the editor in 1932 he promptly published the article "Why the Work of the Opposition is Harmful", arguing that the fight with the Sanacja system had been hijacked by other equally distasteful political groupings making the whole exercise of the political opposition moot and suspect. In its so-called Fifth Phase in 1937, after his own ideological turnabout, he attempted to revive the broadsheet on Promethean lines, that is to say to make it unabashedly an organ "of the struggle to dismember the Russian–Soviet empire into its constituent parts".

=== Turnabout in ideology and poetics ===
==== Suicide attempt ====
During the military service he was performing at a reserve officers' cadet school (szkoła podchorążych rezerwy) in the Polish town of Równe in the Volhynia in 1933–1934 Łobodowski made an unsuccessful attempt on his life by shooting himself. The act was witnessed by others. He was hospitalized, and in the aftermath of the incident arrested (10 March 1934) on charges of possessing "leftist propaganda" (that apparently meant his own poems in manuscript, which were found during a search of his belongings performed in his absence) and placed in military prison for three weeks. The intervention of his literary friends who mobilized some of the greatest names in Polish literature on his behalf, including the well-connected writer Kazimiera Iłłakowiczówna (1892–1983) but also Ewa Szelburg-Zarembina (1899–1986) and others, was instrumental in bringing about his release from jail and in making the whole affair die a sudden death without a court martial or other long-lasting adverse consequences for Łobodowski. Łobodowski's explanation of the reasons for his suicide attempt given subsequently to Iłłakowiczówna and reported in her memoirs as attributable to disappointed love (presumably for Zuzanna Ginczanka) has been treated with scepticism by critical opinion since its publication in 1968. While Łobodowski avoided the subject throughout the rest of his life, a set of more complex reasons concerning the ideological turmoil he was in at the time are nowadays credited as the real cause of the dramatic act he resorted to. Following the military affair at Równe, Łobodowski moved to Warsaw in May 1934.

==== Polemics with Wasilewska ====
During this period Łobodowski changed some of his political views, a fact which is signalled most dramatically in his polemical exchanges with Wanda Wasilewska, a writer of a staunch communist, pro-Soviet, Stalinist stance that she will maintain unshaken even in the face of the Soviet Union's (later) alliance with Hitler and their joint attack on Poland at the beginning of the Second World War. In an article published in 1935 in the most prestigious literary periodical in Poland at the time, the Wiadomości Literackie weekly — as part of his ongoing war of words with Wasilewska — Łobodowski made the following statement which posits self-criticism as the essential element of moral courage, and which thus holds special significance for this period of his ideological transition and the whole rest of his life:

A distinction must be made between on the one hand a heroism of life, which consists in a determined fight [for one's ideals] and the rejection of all compromise, and on the other hand a heroism of mind that has no fear of criticism and of a continuous reappraisal of its primary assumptions. It often so happens that people who bravely go to jail for many years for their beliefs lack the courage to admit before themselves that their sacrifice may be useless — or worse, misguided, being offered in the wrong cause. In this sense many a hero or revolutionary is a retrograde intellectual coward. I doubt it whether Ms. Wasilewska — who in her novels has given us a striking example of the crudity to which facile ideologies can lead — whether she understands this distinction.

— from "The Prophetess of Heroism", Wiadomości Literackie, 1 December 1935.

==== New direction in poetry ====
Critical acclaim and wide recognition as an important voice in literature brought him the collections of poetry Rozmowa z ojczyzną ("A Conversation with the Fatherland"; 1935; 2nd ed., corr. & enl., 1936), much appreciated by Zuzanna Ginczanka, and Demonom nocy ("To the Demons of the Night"; 1936), which won him a coveted prize of the Polish Academy of Literature in 1937 but in private was sharply criticized by Ginczanka. The general adulation showered on him by both the reading public and the critics was tempered by the dissenting voice of Ignacy Fik who wrote of Łobodowski ad personam as "a character most alien to the Polish psyche, a pagan Scythian, a Romantic shot through with anarchism and nihilism, an expansive Russian nature whose longings for his Marzanna are inspired by boredom. And where Łobodowski ends, [Czesław] Miłosz takes over...". Another carping critic, Ludwik Fryde, for his part, accused Łobodowski of "actorship, playacting". However, by 1937 such barbs served as a confirmation of Łobodowski's presence in the public spotlight with his firmly established fame. It has been observed that the latter works for the first time sound a note — from now on to be the characteristic theme of Łobodowski's oeuvre — of tragic pessimism which has been seen by scholars to have its source in the dramatic confrontation between the powers of élan vital and biology on the one hand, and those of culture and ideology on the other. Tymon Terlecki (1905–2000), one of the most astute Polish critics, wrote in 1937 that inasmuch as Łobodowski was difficult of classification in general he did not fit easily within the cultural parameters of any known literary tradition.

The collection Rozmowa z ojczyzną ("A Conversation with the Fatherland"), like the previous book W przeddzień ("On the Eve") of 1932, contains an engagé poem dealing with the Polish dictator First Marshal Piłsudski. Indeed, in this case, the name of Piłsudski is not merely incorporated into the body of the text but constitutes the very title of the 6-stanza, 25-line poem "Piłsudski".

=== Marriage with Jadwiga Kuryłło ===
On 1 March 1938 Józef Łobodowski married Jadwiga Kuryłło at St. John the Baptist Cathedral in Lublin. Depside what Jadwiga's surname might suggest, she was born to a rooted Polish Roman Catholic family. At the time of marriage, Józef was 29 and Jadwiga 26, but they had started their relationship when Jadwiga was still in high school. They became separated when WWII broke up in 1939. Due to the postwar communist reality in Poland, which Józef Łobodowski actively opposed from abroad, they had no contact after the war. Jadwiga divorced Józef on 9 April 1950, just before she remarried. When they were together, Jadwiga participated in Józef's work. After they became separated, Jadwiga tried to preserve Józef's work that she had managed to gather, but most of that was confiscated by Germans. She donated the remaining pieces to the Lublin Museum after the war.

=== Relationship with Zuzanna Ginczanka ===
Józef Łobodowski had a relationship with a Jewish poet Zuzanna Ginczanka. That was opposed by his mother and his sister. Łobodowski first met Zuzanna Ginczanka — in his words, "a precociously mature woman... with eyes scintillating like the vast expanse of the sea shimmering in the sun" — at the multicultural Polish locality of Równe in Volhynia (now within the borders of Ukraine), where he had the uncommon good fortune to have been performing his military service in the autumn of 1933, when Ginczanka was 16 and he 24. When Józef married Jadwiga Kuryłło, Zuzanna ended the relationship. After the War, while living in Madrid, Łobodowski would receive a small parcel posted from Pamplona containing the gift of a golden diamond-studded tie pin, with a small note skewered on it, which read: "From the mother of Zuzanna". What remains for posterity is the extraordinary volume of understated erotic lyrics modelled stylistically on the Song of Songs, with an introduction important for historical reasons, which Łobodowski will dedicate to Ginczanka posthumously late in his own life (at the age of 78): his collection Pamięci Sulamity ("In Remembrance of the Shulamite Woman"), brimming as it is with love for Ginczanka undimmed by the passage of time.

=== Second World War ===
During the last few years preceding the outbreak of the Second World War Łobodowski lived in Łuck, in what was then Poland, moving to Warsaw in April 1938 after his marriage. He was called up in August 1939, a few days before the outbreak of the Second World War, and saw action during the September Campaign in Wiśnicz, Łańcut, and several other places, including a locality known as Dublany (then in Poland, now in Ukraine), which he memorialized in the poem entitled "Dublany" (first published in France in 1941). After the Soviet invasion of Poland on 17 September 1939, while waiting with the remnants of his brigade at Tatarów (now Tatariv in Ukraine) to cross the border into Hungary, he wrote the memorable lines of the "Noc nad granicą" (A Night on the Frontier). The next day, 19 September 1939, they crossed the Polish border through the Yablonitsky Pass: this was the moment Łobodowski would leave his homeland for ever. The veterans of his unit were interned in various places throughout the territory of Hungary, Łobodowski ending up at first at a camp at Tapolca near Lake Balaton. His subsequent wartime peregrinations are not well known; he intended like most men of his unit to join Sikorski's Army in France, and this intention guided his actions while in Hungarian detention. After two unsuccessful attempts at escape, he finally managed to flee to Yugoslavia about a month after arriving in Hungary, eventually reaching Paris on 9 or 10 November 1939. In Paris Łobodowski encountered the Polish poets Jan Lechoń and Kazimierz Wierzyński (who was eager to meet his younger colleague whose fame had preceded him to France), and he began to publish his poems in the émigré press there.

==== On the Molotov–Ribbentrop Pact and the way of ending the War ====
Łobodowski's first text in prose published in Paris was the full-page political article entitled "On the Soviet–German Alliance" which appeared in March 1940 in the Wiadomości Polskie, Polityczne i Literackie, a weekly émigré newspaper newly founded by Mieczysław Grydzewski. The principal thesis of the article was the contention that however unexpected and shocking the collusion between Hitler and Stalin in starting the Second World War might have been in the eyes of the world, their compact was in fact predictable. (He had foretold it himself, he pointed out, in the article published in the Wiadomości Literackie of Warsaw on 2 April 1939, fully 4 months and 3 weeks before the signing of the Molotov–Ribbentrop Pact, which at the time resulted in the wholesale confiscation by the Polish authorities of the newspaper carrying the article on the grounds that the author was spreading unsubstantiated rumours detrimental to public peace.) Such precautions against rumours were predicated on a mistaken view of the Soviet Union as less noxious than that of Nazi Germany, a view that was based not on facts but on wishful thinking. Łobodowski wrote that the only way of ending the War quickly in an Allied victory obtained without millions of dead was not by attacking Nazi Germany on the Western Front but by way of an Allied attack on the Soviet Union on the south-eastern front in the region of the Black Sea and the Caucasus. Such an attack on the Soviet Union would be the most effective form of attack on Nazi Germany itself for the simple reason — Łobodowski wrote — that it would pre-empt Germany's own inevitable transfer of the theatre of war to the region and terminally undermine its capacity to pursue long-term goals (by severing access to natural resources concentrated in the area): but unlike in Europe, a successful outcome for Germany there — even if successful only partially — would have "incalculable consequences" (enabling Germany to strike at British India, etc.). For great wars, concluded Łobodowski, are won only when the forces of history are allowed to do the fighting for you, with the military operations serving in an ancillary and corrective role to them.

==== Arrest in Paris ====
On 20 February 1940 Łobodowski, then aged 30, was arrested by the French police in Paris in circumstances that to this day have not been properly established. The event involved the confiscation of some of his personal effects, including manuscripts, during the search of his hotel room. Some of these materials have never been returned. Those materials included anticommunist propaganda leaflets apparently secretly authored by Łobodowski for the Polish government-in-exile (then based in Paris), which were intended to be dropped from airplanes over the Soviet-occupied parts of Poland for the purpose of fomenting subversion among the Red Army — and as such they were the reason for his detention at the Cherche-Midi military prison over a period of some six months after the Polish government minister responsible for ordering the leaflets in question (Professor Stanisław Kot) denied involvement when interpellated by the French authorities. Łobodowski will use the scurrilously offensive satirical verse "Na Profesora Kota" (On Professor Kot) to lampoon the minister in question in his 1954 collection Uczta zadżumionych ("The Banquet of the Plague-stricken"), calling him again a "cynical swindler" in a parting shot fired one last time towards the end of his life. According to Łobodowski's own testimony, he was not released from prison until September 1940, and that only after having been tried and acquitted by the Supreme Military Court (a circumstance which it will be impossible to verify before the year 2040, as it will be impossible to ascertain the precise nature of the charges he faced). While the prison experience was a significant and perhaps traumatic event in his life, its silver lining — for the posterity — proved the preservation of his police dossier containing what appears to be a complete set of his confiscated manuscripts. The dossier was initially expropriated by the Nazis after the invasion of France and taken to the Third Reich, where towards the end of the War it fell in its turn into the hands of the Soviets and was taken to Moscow, there to be repeatedly and assiduously studied during the following years at the Central Military Archives of the USSR (Центральный государственный Особый архив СССР; as evidenced by the handwritten annotations made in it), until it was finally returned by the Russian Federation to France in recent years. (It was found to contain no propaganda leaflets: only Łobodowski's poetry manuscripts and fragments were present, a circumstance explainable by the probability that the leaflets in question may form part of the as yet unopened French military archives instead.)

=== Post-War period ===
While Łobodowski was a frequent victim of censorship by the Sanacja régime before the War, his legal problems then were to be eclipsed by the very effective, blanket blacklisting of all his writings by the communist censorship of the post-War Poland, which accorded him "a place of honour on the blackest of blacklists" — in the words of the literary critic Michał Chmielowiec. This resulted virtually in his being rendered, while still one of the best-known names in Polish literature, into an "unperson" in the Eastern Bloc. The blackout continued into the 1980s. Łobodowski believed that in every country in which a criminal political system holds dominion all those participating in any capacity in governance are responsible to some degree for the crimes committed in its name. For this reason he regarded with empirical scepticism and moral contempt such events as the Khrushchev Thaw and the Perestroika, for example, arguing that their authors, Nikita Khrushchev and Mikhail Gorbachev respectively, had not satisfactorily explained their own complicity in the crimes of the previous Soviet régimes which they later purported to criticize as the wrongdoing of others rather than their own. The great communist empire was for him a satanic domain chiefly on account of its subversion of truth as a method of survival and self-preservation (rather than because of its expansionist propensities, the chief point in Ronald Reagan's definition of the Evil empire). Thus the most effective method of combating totalitarianism was the upholding of Truth and its widest possible dissemination, a view which he upheld not only in theory but in his active practice as opinion writer and translator of the dissident writers suppressed within the Soviet Union and elsewhere: Andrei Sinyavsky, Aleksandr Solzhenitsyn, Yuli Daniel, Andrei Sakharov, and others (see Translations). But during his life in Franco's Spain he did not make the slightest criticism of the Spanish fascist government.

== Postscript ==
Unlike many other poets, Łobodowski was very good at reading his own poems in public, and they gained at his recitation.

He was influenced by Juliusz Słowacki, Henryk Sienkiewicz (prose), Julian Tuwim, Kazimierz Wierzyński, Józef Czechowicz, Władysław Broniewski, and Stefan Żeromski.

== Works ==
=== Poetry ===
==== Poetry monographs ====
- Słońce przez szpary (1929)
- Gwiezdny psałterz (1931)
- O czerwonej krwi (1932)
- W przeddzień (1932)
- Rozmowa z ojczyzną (1935; 2nd ed., 1936)
- U przyjaciół (1935)
- Demonom nocy (1936)
- Lubelska szopka polityczna (1937)
- Z dymem pożarów (1941)
- Modlitwa na wojnę (1947)
- Rachunek sumienia (1954)
- Uczta zadżumionych (1954)
- Złota hramota (1954)
- Pieśń o Ukrainie (1959; bilingual edition: text in Polish and Ukrainian)
- Kasydy i gazele (1961)
- Nożyce Dalili (1968)
- Jarzmo kaudyńskie (1969)
- Rzeka graniczna (1970)
- W połowie wędrówki (1972)
- Dwie książki (1984)
- Mare Nostrum (1986)
- Pamięci Sulamity (1987)
- Rachunek sumienia: wybór wierszy 1940–1980 (1987)
- Dytyramby patetyczne (1988)

==== Selected poetry in periodicals ====
- "Modlitwa na satyrę" (A Prayer For Satire; Wiadomości: tygodnik (London), vol. 1, No. 38/39 (38/39), 29 December 1946, p. 1)
- "Serbrna śmierć" (Silver Death; Wiadomości: tygodnik (London), vol. 2, No. 51/52 (90/91), 28 December 1947, p. 1)
- "Erotyk" (Erotic Poem; Wiadomości: tygodnik (London), vol. 2, No. 51/52 (90/91), 28 December 1947, p. 1)
- "Dwie pochwały Heleny Fourment" (Two Eulogies in praise of Hélène Fourment; Wiadomości: tygodnik (London), vol. 12, No. 40 (601), 6 October 1957, p. 1)
- "Nowe wiersze" (New Poems; Wiadomości: tygodnik (London), vol. 31, No. 7 (1559), 15 February 1976, p. 1)
- "Kolęda dla Papieża" ("A Christmas Carol for the Pope"; Wiadomości: tygodnik (London), vol. 34, No. 51/52 (1760/1761), 23–30 December 1979, p. 1)

=== Drama ===
- Lubelska szopka polityczna (1937)

=== Prose ===
- Por nuestra libertad y la vuestra: Polonia sigue luchando (1945)
- Literaturas eslavas (1946)
- Komysze (1955)
- W stanicy (1958)
- Droga powrotna (1960)
- Czerwona wiosna (1965)
- Terminatorzy rewolucji (1966)
- Pro relihii︠u︡ bez pomazanni︠a︡: likvidatory Uniï (1972)

==== Selected opinion journalism ====
- "Prawda i nieprawda: o literaturze proletariackiej" ("Truth and Untruth: About Proletarian Literature", Kurjer Lubelski, 3 April 1932; on the political polemics round the novel of Bruno Jasieński, Palę Paryż, "I Burn Paris", 1929)
- "Kultura czy chamstwo" ("Culture or Caddishness?", Kurjer Lubelski, 17 October 1932; on the way the political polemics are being conducted in the Polish press)
- "Dlaczego działalność opozycji jest szkodliwa" ("Why the Work of the Opposition is Harmful", Kurjer Lubelski, 22 October 1932; on the so-called political opposition in Poland not being a viable option for the electorate)
- "Potrzebne jest samobójstwo" ("What You Need is a Suicide", Kurjer Lubelski, 25 October 1932; on the need for the Polish society to free itself from the old entrenched ways of thinking)
- "Smutne porachunki" ("Settling the Sad Scores", Wiadomości Literackie, 27 October 1935; a response to Stefan Napierski's review of Rozmowa z ojczyzną; an apologia pro vita sua after the "turn" of 1934/1935)
- "Adwokatka heroizmu" ("The Prophetess of Heroism", Wiadomości Literackie, 1 December 1935; a response to Wanda Wasilewska)
- "Tropicielom polskości" ("To the Assayers of Polishness", Wiadomości Literackie, 13 June 1937; a response to Bolesław Miciński's review of Demonom nocy)
- "O sojuszu sowiecko–niemieckim" ("On the Soviet–German Alliance", Wiadomości Polskie, Polityczne i Literackie, 17 March 1940; on the Molotov–Ribbentrop Pact and the ways of winning the Second World War)

=== Selected posthumous editions of Łobodowski's works ===
- List do kraju (1989)
- Kassandra jest niepopularna: wybór tekstów z Orła Białego z lat 1956–1980 (1990)
- Worek Judaszów (1995)
- Naród jest nieśmiertelny: Józef Łobodowski o Ukraińcach i Polakach (1996; bilingual edition: text in Polish and Ukrainian)

=== Selected translations by Łobodowski ===
- Józef Łobodowski, comp. & tr., U przyjaciół, Lublin, [n.p.], 1935.
- Sergei Yesenin, "Tęsknota w ojczyźnie" (1932; translation from Russian into Polish, published in Kurjer Lubelski of 14 October 1932, of the poem "Устал я жить в родном краю...": "I'm Tired of Living in My Land...")
- Aleksandr Blok, Wiersze włoskie (1935; translation from Russian into Polish, jointly with Kazimierz Andrzej Jaworski, of Итальянские стихи: "Italian Poems")
- [Zdzisław Stahl], El crimen de Katyn a la luz de los documentos (1952; translation from Polish into Spanish of Zbrodnia katyńska w świetle dokumentów: "The Katyn Crime Against Humanity in the light of the Documents")
- Boris Pasternak, Doktor Żywago (1959; translation from Russian into Polish of Доктор Живаго: "Doctor Zhivago", poetry sections only)
- Abram Tertz (sc. Andrei Sinyavsky), Sąd idzie (1959; translation from Russian into Polish of Суд идет: "On Trial: The Soviet State versus 'Abram Tertz' and 'Nikolai Arzhak'")
- Aleksey Remizov, Czy istnieje życie na Marsie (1961; translation from Russian into Polish of Есть ли жизнь на Марсе?: "Is There Life on Mars?")
- Abram Tertz (sc. Andrei Sinyavsky), Lubimow (1961; translation from Russian into Polish of Любимов)
- Abram Tertz (sc. Andrei Sinyavsky), Opowiesci fantastyczne (1961; translation from Russian into Polish of Фантастические повести: "Fantastic Stories")
- Yuli Daniel, Mówi Moskwa (1962; translation from Russian into Polish of Говорит Москва: "This is Moscow Speaking")
- We własnych oczach (1963; translations from Russian into Polish in the anthology of contemporary Russian poetry, "In Their Own Eyes"; co-translator)
- Aleksandr Solzhenitsyn, Zagroda Matriony (1963; translation from Russian into Polish of Матрёнин двор: "Matryona's Place")
- Andrei Sinyavsky, Myśli niespodziewane (1965; translation from Russian into Polish of Мысли врасплох: "Unguarded Thoughts")
- Galina Serebryakova (Галина Серебрякова), Huragan (1967; translation from Russian into Polish of Смерч: "Tornado")
- Andrei Sakharov, Rozmyślania o postępie, pokojowym współistnieniu i wolności intelektualnej (1968; translation from Russian into Polish of Размышления о прогрессе, мирном сосуществовании и интеллектуальной свободе: "Thoughts on Progress, Peaceful Coexistence, and Intellectual Freedom")
- Ivan Koshelivets', comp.; Józef Łobodowski, tr., Ukraina 1956–1968, Paris, Instytut Literacki, 1969. (An anthology of Łobodowski's translations from Ukrainian poetry into Polish.)
- Aleksandr Solzhenitsyn, Oddział chorych na raka (1973; translation from Russian into Polish of Раковый корпус: "Cancer Ward")

== Bibliography ==
- Tymon Terlecki, "Poezje Cezarego Baryki: Rzecz o Łobodowskim" (The Verses of Cezary Baryka: A Disquisition on Łobodowski), Tygodnik Illustrowany (Warsaw), vol. 78, No. 16 (4,038), 18 April 1937, pages 311–312. (A critique of Łobodowski's oeuvre in juxtaposition of his person with that of the fictional character Cezary Baryka, the protagonist of the novel cycle The Spring to Come by Stefan Żeromski for whom the character served as one of his heteronyms à la Pessoa's.)
- Janusz Kryszak, Katastrofizm ocalający: z problematyki poezji tzw. Drugiej Awangardy, 2nd ed., enl., Bydgoszcz, Pomorze, 1985. ISBN 8370030068.
- Józef Zięba, "Żywot Józefa Łobodowskiego", in 8 installments, Relacje, Nos. 3–10, 1989.
- Wacław Iwaniuk, Ostatni romantyk: wspomnienie o Józefie Łobodowskim, ed. J. Kryszak, Toruń, Uniwersytet Mikołaja Kopernika, 1998. ISBN 832310915X.
- Marek Zaleski, Przygoda drugiej awangardy, 2nd ed., corr. & enl., Wrocław, Zakład Narodowy im. Ossolińskich, 2000. ISBN 8304045699. (1st ed., 1984.)
- Irena Szypowska, Łobodowski: od "Atamana Łobody" do "Seniora Lobo", Warsaw, Ludowa Spółdzielnia Wydawnicza, 2001. ISBN 8320545897.
- Ludmiła Siryk, Naznaczony Ukrainą: o twórczości Józefa Łobodowskiego, Lublin, Wydawnictwo Uniwersytetu Marii Curie-Skłodowskiej, 2002. ISBN 8322719604.
- Paweł Libera, "Józef Łobodowski (1909–1988): szkic do biografii politycznej pisarza zaangażowanego", Zeszyty Historyczne, No. 160, Paris, Instytut Literacki, 2007, pages 3–34. ISSN 0406-0393; ISBN 2716802076. (Useful as an overview despite obvious inaccuracies of detail: Łobodowski's date of birth given as "9 March 1909" instead of 19 March (p. 11), Tymon Terlecki misnamed "Olgierd Terlecki" (p. 14), etc.)
- Łobodowski: życie, twórczość, publicystyka, wspomnienia: w stulecie urodzin Józefa Łobodowskiego, ed. M. Skrzypek & A. Zińczuk, Lublin, Ośrodek Brama Grodzka-Teatr NN & Stowarzyszenie Brama Grodzka, 2009.

== See also ==
- Ukrainian school
- List of Poles
- List of Polish-language poets
