= Émile Meyerson =

Polish-French epistemologist, chemist, and philosopher

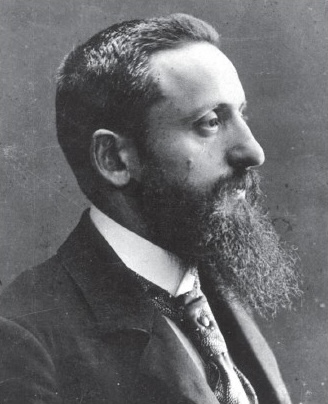
- Born: 12 February 1859; Lublin, Congress Poland
- Died: 2 December 1933 (aged 74); Paris, France

Education
- Education: University of Heidelberg; University of Berlin; Collège de France
- Academic advisor: Robert Bunsen

Philosophical work
- Era: 20th-century philosophy
- Region: Western philosophy
- School: French historical epistemology Epistemological realism Neo-Kantianism
- Main interests: History and philosophy of science, epistemology, general relativity
- Notable ideas: Principle of lawfulness, principle of causality

Émile Meyerson (French: [mɛjɛʁsɔn]; 12 February 1859 – 2 December 1933) was a Polish-born French epistemologist, chemist, philosopher of science and Zionist activist.

== Biography ==
Meyerson was born Ezryel-Szoel-Froim Meyerson (Note: Polish: [ˈmɛjɛrsɔn]) to a Jewish family. He was educated at the University of Heidelberg and studied chemistry under Robert Wilhelm Bunsen. In 1882 Meyerson settled in Paris. He served as foreign editor of the Havas news agency, and later as the director of the Jewish Colonization Association for Europe and Asia Minor. He became a naturalized French citizen after World War I.

Thomas Kuhn cites Meyerson's work as influential while developing the ideas for his main work The Structure of Scientific Revolutions.

In La Déduction relativiste, Meyerson expressed the view that Einstein's general theory of relativity was a new version of the identification of matter with space, which he considered "the postulate upon which the whole (Cartesian) system rests."

== Works ==
- Identité et réalité (1908)
- De l'explication dans les sciences, 2 vols. (1921)
- La déduction relativiste (1925)
- Du cheminement de la pensée, 3 vols. (1931)
- Réel et déterminisme dans la physique quantique (1933)
- Essais (1936)

== See also ==
- Franciszka Arnsztajnowa (his sister)
