= Biernacki =

Biernacki (feminine Biernacka) is a Polish surname, it may refer to:

- Edmund Biernacki (1866–1911), Polish physician
- Marek Biernacki (born 1959), Polish politician
- Marianna Biernacka (1888–1943), Polish martyr of World War II
- Mieczysław Biernacki (1891–1959), Polish mathematical chemist
- Stefan Dąb-Biernacki (1890–1959), Polish general
- Wacław Kostek-Biernacki (1882–1957), Polish politician and writer

== See also ==
- Bernacki
