= Bernacki =

Bernacki (feminine Bernacka) is a Polish surname. Notable people with the surname include:

- Bronislaw Bernacki (1944–2024), Ukrainian Roman Catholic prelate
- Gerard Bernacki (1942–2018), Polish Roman Catholic prelate

== See also ==
- Biernacki
