= Volodymyr Bernatsky =

Ukrainian artist (1938-)

Bernatsky Volodymyr Nyfontovych (Ukrainian: Берна́цький Polish: Biernácki, Bernácki Russian: Берна́цкий) (born June 8, 1938, in Sosnytsia, Ukrainian SSR) is a Ukrainian artist, painter, and graphic designer.

== Biography ==
Bernatsky was born in Sosnytsia, Chernihiv Oblast, Ukrainian SSR. Member NUAU (1988). He graduated from the Ukrainian Polygraphic Institute Fedorova (1969. cl. A. Popov. Y. Gapon). 1964-74 - artist-designer NDIHimmash (Poltava) from 1974 - the schedule of Poltava, Art-product Fund. Participated in local rep. (from 1978) and All-Union, (from 1982) shows. Personal - in Poltava (1999, 2002). Works in field usage graphics and interior design. Renders as portraits, still lifes. landscapes and tapestries. Works are in Poltava's local history Museum and collections NSHU. Living in Poltava.

== Works ==
Airport Interiors (1981) and Bus terminal (1982) in Poltava. Posters - "Balance", "City - clear sky" (1978). "60 anniversary of the USSR", "The atmosphere must be pure", "End of the Blitzkrieg" (all - 1982). "Check work quality", "First count - then sow", "Always remember" (all -1985). Still life - "Flowers" (1999). "Yellow Tulips" (2002). In painting prefers watercolors.
