= Sergei Bernatsky =

Russian ice hockey player (born 1982)

- Born: March 1, 1982 (age 43) Voskresensk, Russia
- Height: 6 ft 0 in (183 cm)
- Weight: 196 lb (89 kg; 14 st 0 lb)
- Position: Defence
- Shoots: Left
- KHL team Former teams: Free Agent; Krylia Sovetov; HC Neftekhimik Nizhnekamsk; Metallurg Magnitogorsk; Torpedo Nizhny Novgorod; HC Sochi
- Playing career: 2001–present

Sergei Bernatsky (born March 1, 1982) is a Russian professional ice hockey defenceman. He is currently an unrestricted free agent. He most recently played with HC Sochi of the Kontinental Hockey League (KHL).

== Playing career ==
Bernatsky began his professional career in 2000 as a part of the now defunct Superleague with HC CSKA Moscow, having played before a few seasons for the farm club of his native hometown with Chemist.

Before the 2007–08 season, Bernatsky moved to HC Neftekhimik Nizhnekamsk. Bernatsky made his Kontinental Hockey League debut playing with HC Neftekhimik Nizhnekamsk during the inaugural 2008–09 KHL season. He played in Nizhnekamsk until 2011 earning a reputation for playing a physical and tough game. Upon leaving the club, he held the record in the number of penalty minutes in the national championship.

On May 8, 2011, Sergei signed a two-year contract with Metallurg Magnitogorsk. On May 1 2013, Sergei has signed a contract with Torpedo Nizhny Novgorod.
