= Józef Czechowicz =

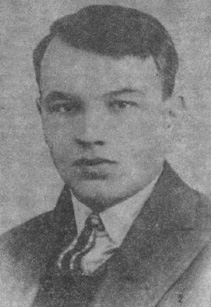
- Józef Czechowicz
- Born: 15 March 1903; Lublin, Tsardom of Poland
- Died: 9 September 1939 (aged 36); Lublin, Poland
- Occupations: Poet, writer, journalist, teacher

Józef Czechowicz (15 March 1903 – 9 September 1939) was an avant-garde Polish poet. Known as a nostalgic, catastrophic author, he was also the leader of the literary avant-garde and bohemians in Lublin. For this visionary poet, verse seemed to be a question of imagination; he would play with word consonances, dreamlike associations, musicality, and create picturesque visions. Czechowicz lived and worked in Lublin before moving to Warsaw; he also died in Lublin, a few days after World War II had started.

== Life ==
Józef Czechowicz came from a poor family living in Lublin. He was born in a basement flat, which has not survived to these days, at 3 Kapucyńska Street. His father, Paweł Czechowicz, worked as a janitor and, later, as a meter leader in the Warsaw Bank in Lublin. In 1912, he died due to a severe mental disease. Józef Czechowicz's mother, Małgorzata, née Sułek, was a good-natured person of a tiny posture. 10 years older than her husband, she died in 1936. The poet dedicated many of his poems to her. Apart from Józef, Paweł and Małgorzata had three more children: Janek, Katarzyna and Stanisław.

In 1913 Czechowicz went to a Russian primary school in Lublin and graduated from the First Seven-Form City School in 1917. During the Polish-Soviet War, in 1920, he volunteered to join the Polish Army but later came back home to continue his education. The poet attended the Teacher’s College, the Higher Teacher’s Course in Lublin and completed his education in 1929, graduating from the Institute of Special Pedagogy in Warsaw.

At first, he worked as a teacher in Brasława, Słobódka and Włodzimierz (Volodymyr-Volynskyi); he also taught in a special school in Lublin, whose manager he eventually became.

While his first volume of verse, kamień (stone) was printed in 1927, it is considered that he officially made his debut, publishing in the first issue of Reflektor the poetic prose story "Opowieść o papierowej koronie" (A Story of a Paper Crown), whose protagonist is Henryk, a disappointed homosexual lover who has attempted suicide.

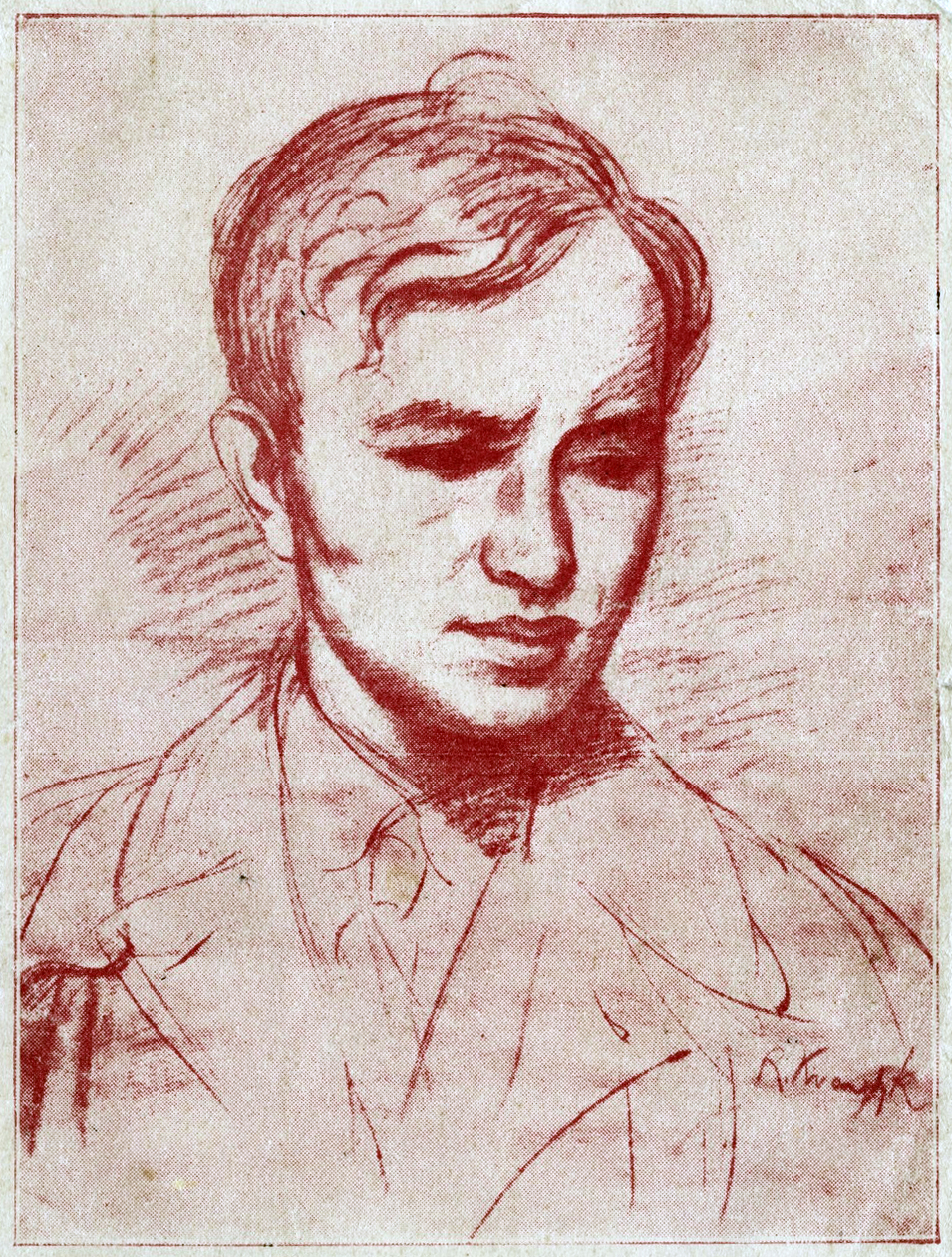
1931 sketch of Józef Czechowicz by Roman Kramsztyk

Józef Czechowicz was himself a homosexual. His sexual orientation significantly influenced his writing but it also led him to face repression.

He also worked as a journalist and an editor of newspapers and magazines based in Lublin. He followed this occupation after he moved to Warsaw in 1933. He belonged to the Polish Teachers' Union and supported many of his writing friends, with both finances and publishing. He would take care of a group of poets who used to live at 9 Dobra St: Henryk Domiński, Wacław Mrozowski and Bronisław Ludwik Michalski. While he was living in Warsaw, he developed friendships with poets such as Czesław Miłosz and Anna Świrszczyńska.

=== Death ===
As Alina Kowalczykowa indicates, in the poetry volume nuta człowiecza Czechowicz envisioned himself being "struck by a bomb." Having heard about the outbreak of World War II, Czechowicz left Warsaw and returned to his native Lublin. He was convinced that being outside the capital city would keep him safe. On 9 September 1939, between 9 and 10 a.m., he was at a barber's shop at 46 Krakowskie Przedmieście St. when the building was bombarded and he died.

== Poetry ==
In his approach to rhyme and metrics, Czechowicz was unorthodox. However, as Czesław Miłosz cogently points out, "all of his poetry is intrinsically linked to the so-called 'bourgeois lyricism' of the seventeenth century and to folk songs." He emphasised a striking harmonious musicality in his poetry by using onomatopoeia, phonetic instrumentation, and sonorous neologisms as well as selecting originally harmonious rare assonances and rhymes.

Czechowicz is often described as a poet of the city, of small towns and provinces. The supernatural character of the worlds presented in his poetry is intensified by the use of personifications, including nature and landscape elements. His rejection of capital letters and punctuation also increases the atmosphere of mystery and ambiguity that typify his works.

Czesław Miłosz notes that the very voice of this poet, barely audible and murmuring, cannot be compared to any kind of Western poetry, and it appears untranslatable in that it exploits concealed sonorities characteristic of one particular language. Still, some analogies can be suggested: "His lyrics can be likened to chamber music made poignant by the counterpoint of dark philosophical and metaphysical problems."

== Józef Czechowicz Museum in Lublin ==
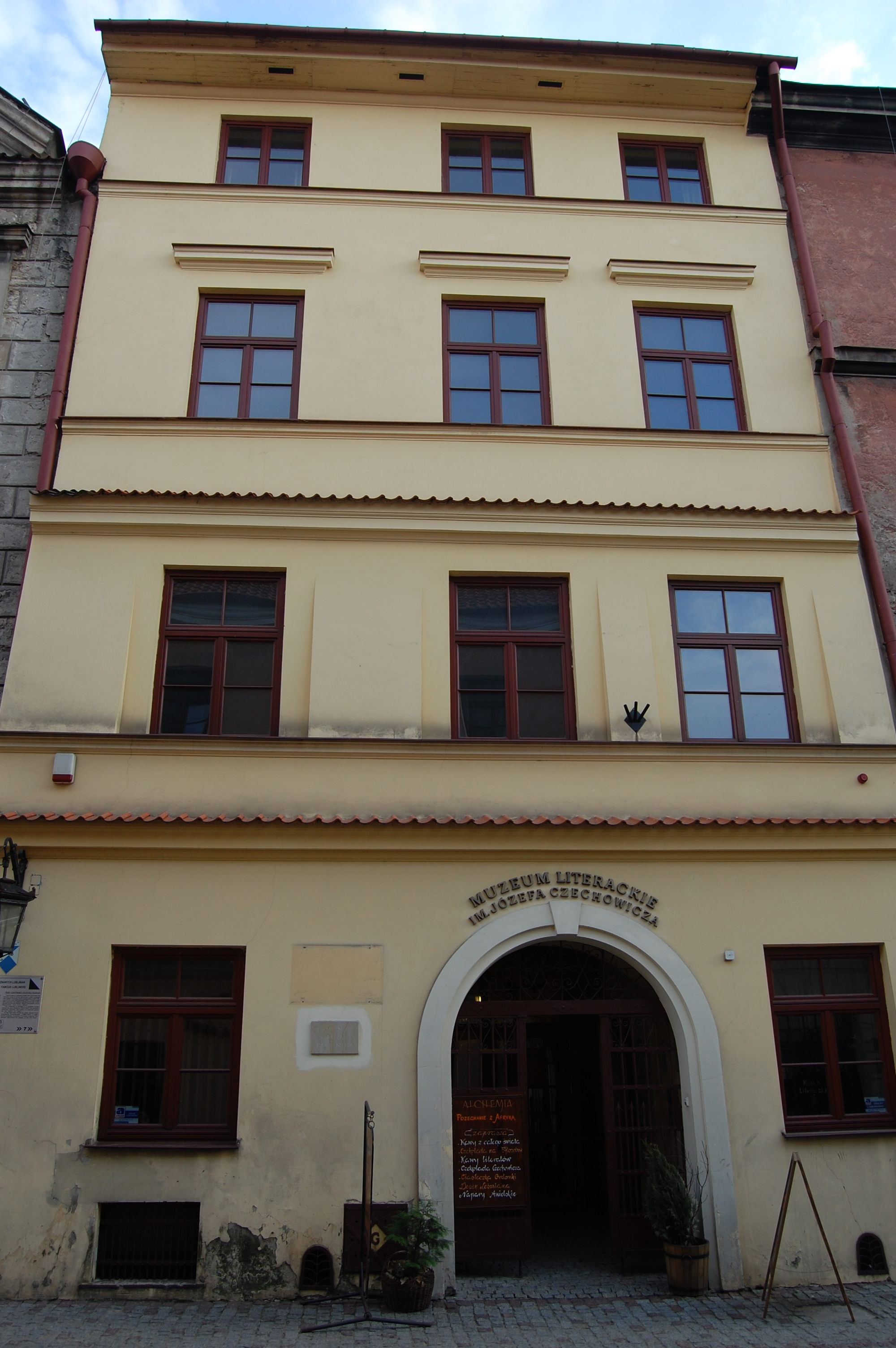
Józef Czechowicz Museum in Lublin, Złota Street

The Józef Czechowicz Museum in Lublin is a department of the National Museum in Lublin. The museum's main goal is to collect and share manuscripts and publications by or about Czechowicz, though not exclusively (other writers from the Lublin region are also included).

The museum was inaugurated on 9 September 1968, on the 29th anniversary of Czechowicz's tragic death. Originally, it was situated at 10 Narutowicza St. Since 9 September 2002 the exhibitions of the museum are accessible to the public in an old tenement building at 3 Złota St. (in the Old Town).

== Published works ==
=== Collections of poems ===
- kamień (1927)
- dzień jak codzień (1930)
- ballada z tamtej strony (1932)
- stare kamienie (1934)
- w błyskawicy (1934)
- nic więcej (1936)
- arkusz poetycki (1938)
- nuta człowiecza (1939)

=== Translations ===
- A Poem about Lublin (1934, from stare kamienie) translated by Małgorzata Sady and George Hyde (London 2002-2005)
- Ein Poem über Lublin translated from the English version into German by Paul Alfred Kleinert (Vienna 2020)
- Some poems have been translated into English and German and have been published in anthologies in those countries. Polnische Poesie des 20. Jahrhunderts (edited and translated by Karl Dedecius, Munich 1964); Polnische Lyrik aus fünf Jahrzehnten (edited by Henryk Bereska and Heinrich Olschowsky, Berlin and Weimar 1975); Sto Wierszy Polskich/ Hundert polnische Gedichte (bilingual edition, edited and translated by Karl Dedecius, Kraków 1982/‘89); Panorama der polnischen Literatur des 20. Jahrhunderts. Poesie (edited and translated by Karl Dedecius, Zürich 1996); Polnische Lyrik aus 100 Jahren (edited by Sergiusz Sterna-Wachowiak, Gifkendorf 1997); Makkaronische Dichtung, Zurich 2013).

=== Plays ===
- Czasu Jutrzennego
- Jasne Miecze
- Obraz

== See also ==
- Polish literature
- Lublin
