= Wiadomości (London magazine) =

Defunct Polish émigré literary and political newspaper

- Editor-in-chief: Stefania Kossowska
- Former editors: Michał Chmielowiec, Mieczysław Grydzewski
- Staff writers: Stanisław Baliński, Ferdynand Goetel, Jan Lechoń, Adam Pragier, Stanisław Stroński, Wiktor Weintraub, Kazimierz Wierzyński, Józef Wittlin and Stefania Zahorska
- Categories: Politics, geopolitics, books and culture and foreign affairs
- Frequency: Weekly
- Founder: Mieczysław Grydzewski and Antoni Borman
- Founded: 1946
- First issue: April 1946
- Final issue: April 1981
- Country: United Kingdom
- Based in: London
- Language: Polish

Wiadomości (Polish pronunciation: [vjadɔˈmɔɕt͡ɕi]) was a Polish cultural weekly magazine published in London between 1946 and 1981. The journal was the continuation title of the pre-World War II weekly, Wiadomości Literackie, published in Warsaw (1924–1939) and subsequently of the "Wiadomości Polskie, Polityczne i Literackie", published during the War (1940–1944) in Paris and London.

== History ==
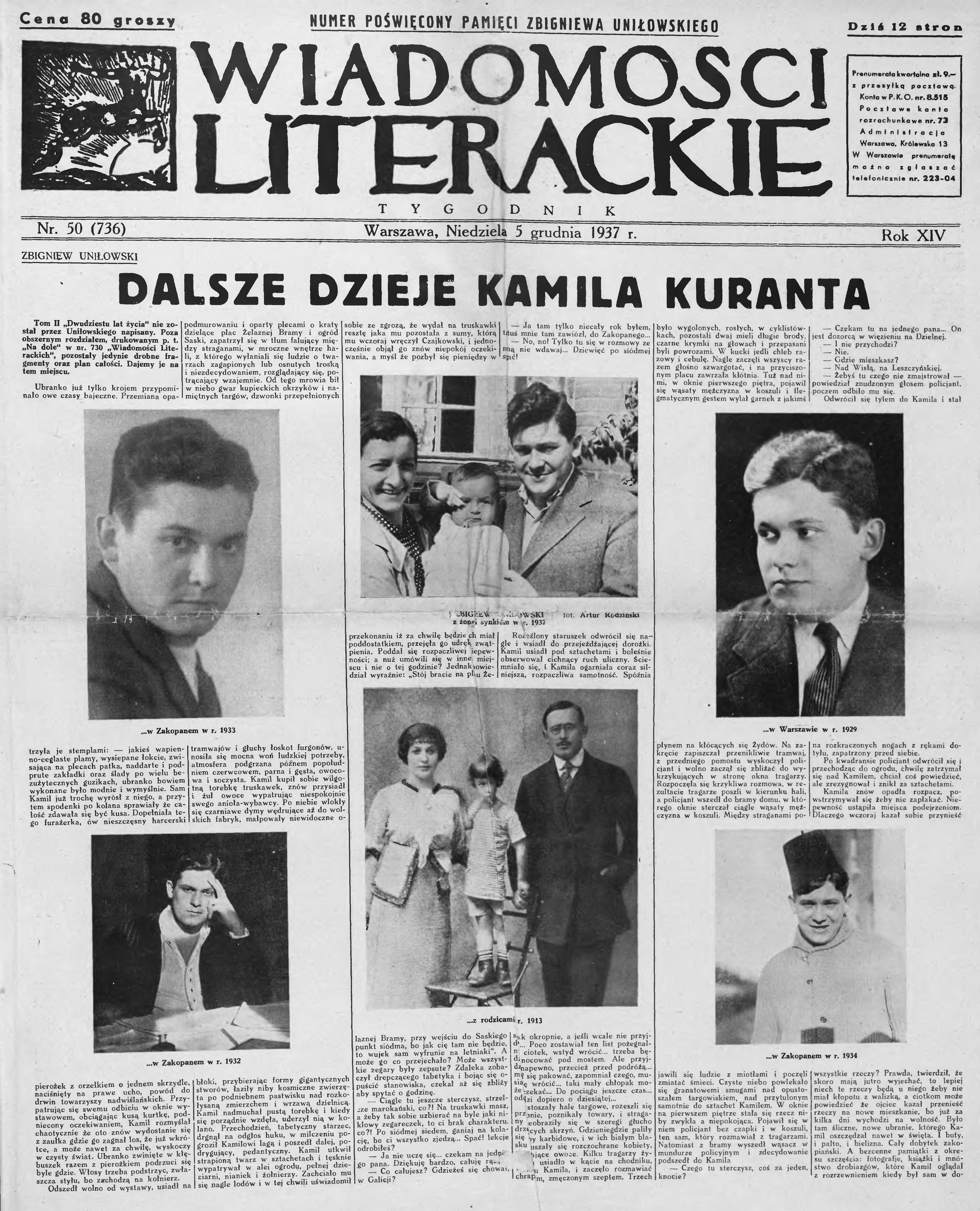
1937 Warsaw edition of Wiadomości Literackie, 5 December no. 50

The paper's founders in London were Mieczysław Grydzewski and Antoni Borman. Grydzewski was a seasoned publicist having already begun as the editor of the monthly literary review Skamander in 1920s Poland, before founding and editing Wiadomości Literackie in 1924. The modest circulation of 15,000, appealed mainly to the Polish intelligentsia and belied its profound cultural impact on the newly resurrected nation state. Its early contributors were heavily drawn from the Skamander literary group which numbered in its ranks people such as Julian Tuwim, Antoni Słonimski, Kazimierz Wierzyński, Jan Lechoń, Jarosław Iwaszkiewicz, Józef Wittlin, Stanisław Baliński, Zuzanna Ginczanka. Others included Tadeusz Boy-Żeleński, Emil Breiter, Michał Choromański, Karol Irzykowski, Irena Krzywicka, Jerzy Liebert, Stanisław Ossowski, Maria Pawlikowska-Jasnorzewska, Ksawery Pruszyński, Jozef Retinger, Zbigniew Uniłowski, Michał Walicki, Bruno Winawer and Stefania Zahorska. In 1933 Bruno Schulz made his debut in its columns. Illustrations and cartoons were by Zdzisław Czermański, Władysław Daszewski and Jerzy Zaruba among others.

At the outbreak of war in September 1939, Grydzewski fled Poland and arrived in France. After the capitulation of France he moved to the United Kingdom, where he remained for the rest of his life. In Paris Grydzewski resumed his publishing activity with Wiadomości Polskie, Polityczne i Literackie ('Polish News, Political and Literary'). Wiadomości Polskie continued in London. In September 1941 its distribution was restricted by the Polish government-in-exile in that Polish Armed Forces were forbidden to receive it on account of its published criticism of the Sikorski–Mayski agreement. It was effectively closed down by the British authorities when its paper allowance was discontinued in February 1944, possibly at the request of the Polish authorities.

== New beginnings ==
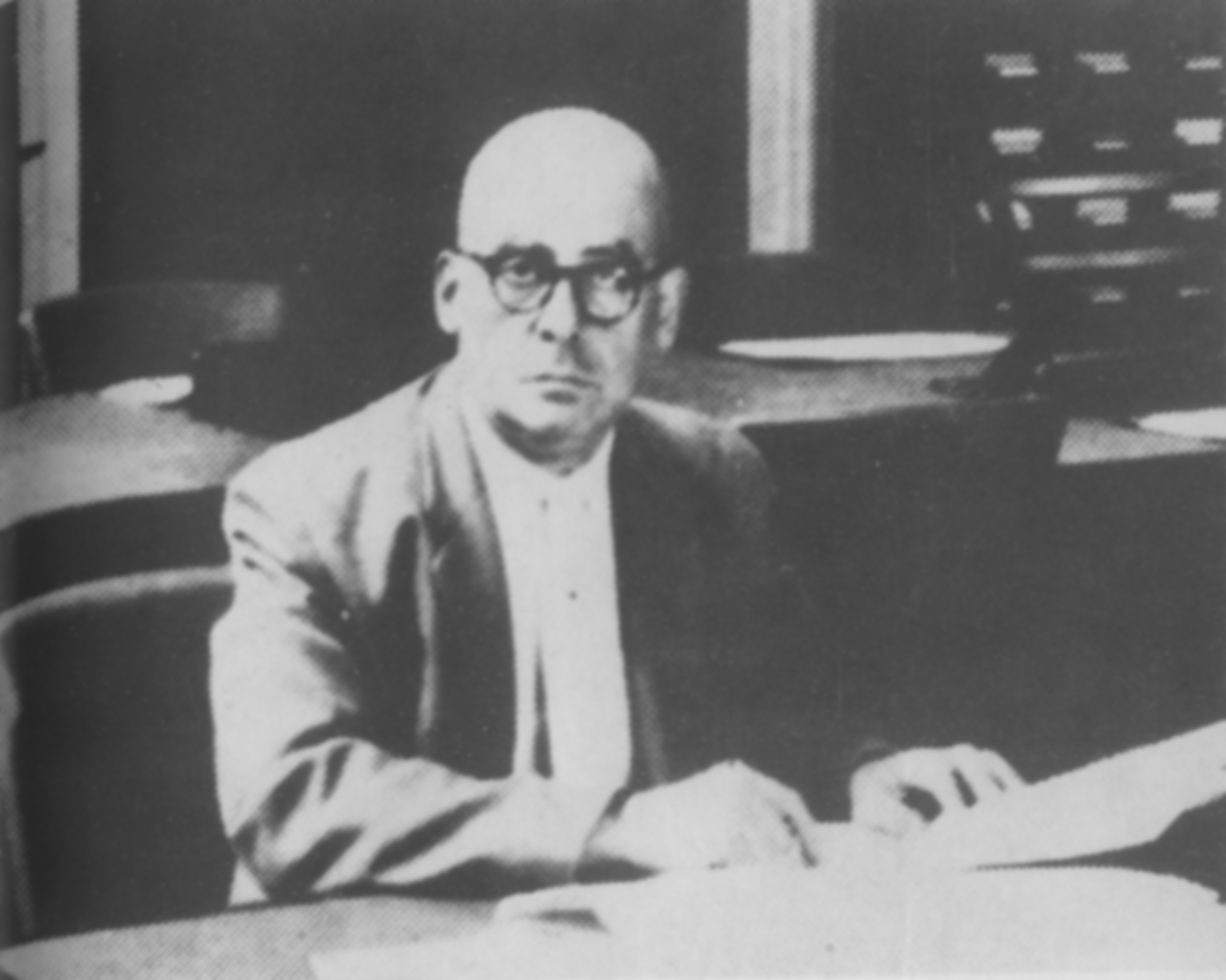
Mieczyslaw Grydzewski, founder and editor-in-chief

In 1946, Grydzewski resumed publication of his weekly monochrome broadsheet format on glossy paper, under the title Wiadomości. The editors-in-chief were: Mieczysław Grydzewski, (officially until his death in 1970, in practice until 1966, when he was partially paralysed after a stroke), Michał Chmielowiec until 1974, and Stefania Kossowska until 1981, who also contributed sketches under the pseudonym, "Big Ben". No longer incommoded by war time restrictions it followed in the tradition of its pre-war precursor Wiadomości Literackie. Among its regular contributors were some old hands, Stanisław Baliński, Ferdynand Goetel, Marian Hemar, Jerzy Stempowski, Marian Kukiel, Jan Lechoń, Wacław Lednicki, Józef Łobodowski, Rafał Malczewski, Józef Mackiewicz, Zygmunt Nowakowski, Adam Pragier, Jan Rostworowski, Stanisław Stroński, Tymon Terlecki, Wiktor Weintraub, Ignacy Wieniewski, Kazimierz Wierzyński and Józef Wittlin.

=== Polish book prize ===
In 1958 an English Polonophile, Auberon Herbert, sponsored an annual "Wiadomości Prize" for the best rated newly published émigré book (not necessarily a novel). Prize-winners began with Marek Hłasko, followed by archaeology professor Tadeusz Sulimirski, Witold Gombrowicz, Leopold Tyrmand, Czesław Miłosz and Włodzimierz Odojewski among others.

Later the weekly published work by contemporary poets, who had emerged since the Second World War, including, Stanisław Barańczak, Adam Zagajewski, Florian Śmieja, Bogdan Czaykowski, Adam Czerniawski and Andrzej Aleksander Włodarczyk. With a reducing readership and falling revenues, the final edition of the weekly appeared between March and April 1981. The book prize continued until 1990.

=== Archive ===
The Wiadomości archive, having been safeguarded initially by the Lanckoroński Foundation in London's Kensington, was finally deposited for permanent safe-keeping with the main Emigration Archive housed in the University of Torun Library. In the interim, The Emigration Archive was able to secure a number of lost letters to and from the Editor of Wiadomości which turned up in various auction houses.
