= Aniela Pawlikowska =

Polish artist (1901–1980)

Aniela "Lela" Pawlikowska
- Born: Aniela Wolska; 11 July 1901; Lwów, Austrian Empire
- Died: 23 December 1980 (aged 79); London, United Kingdom
- Education: Kraków Academy of Fine Arts
- Known for: Painting, graphic art, book illustration, sacred art
- Notable work: portraiture in Poland, Italy and United Kingdom

Aniela Pawlikowska, known as Lela Pawlikowska (11 July 1901 - 23 December 1980), was a Polish artist, illustrator and society portrait painter. She came to prominence in the United Kingdom in the 1950s and '60s.

== Life ==
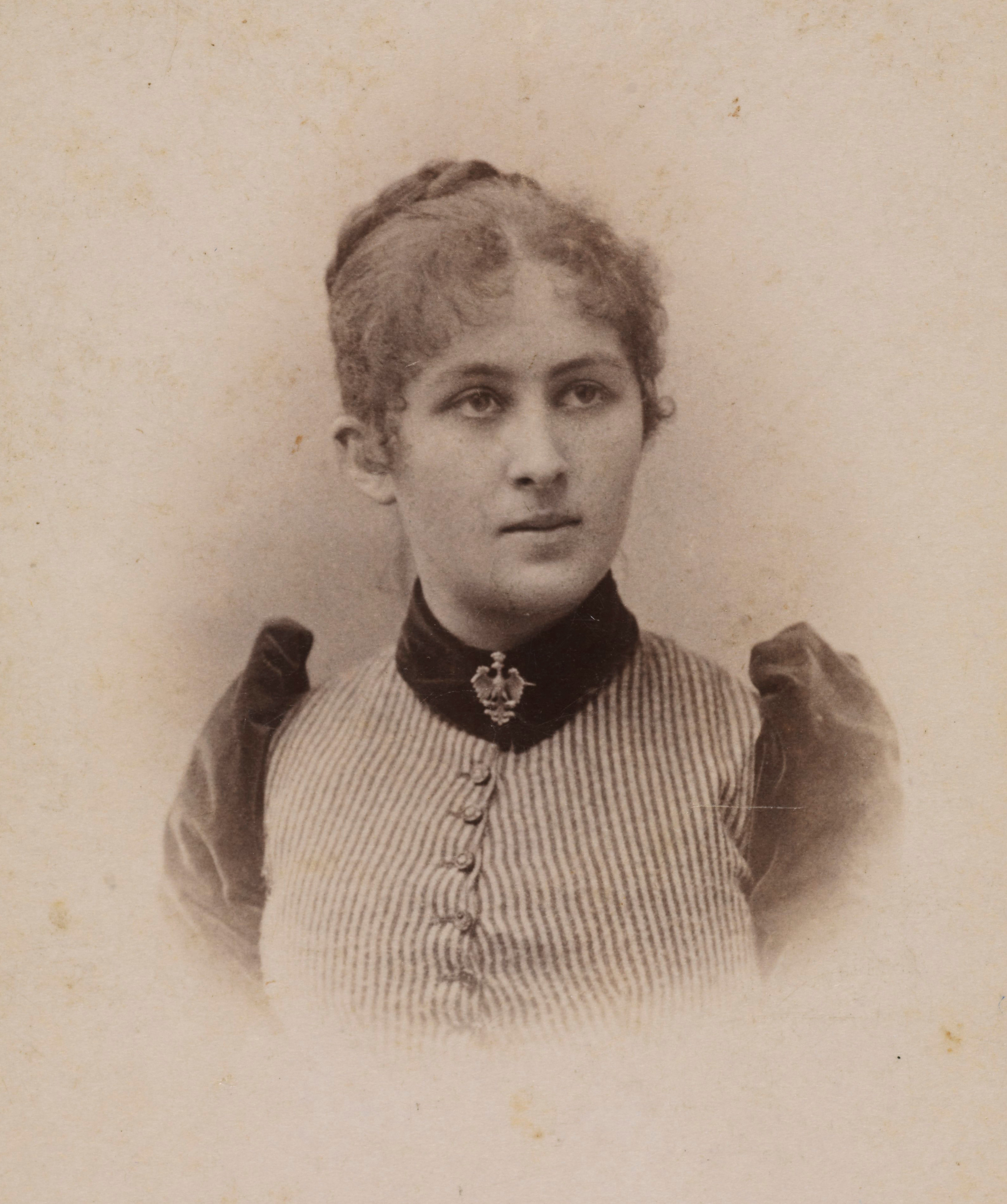
Maryla Wolska

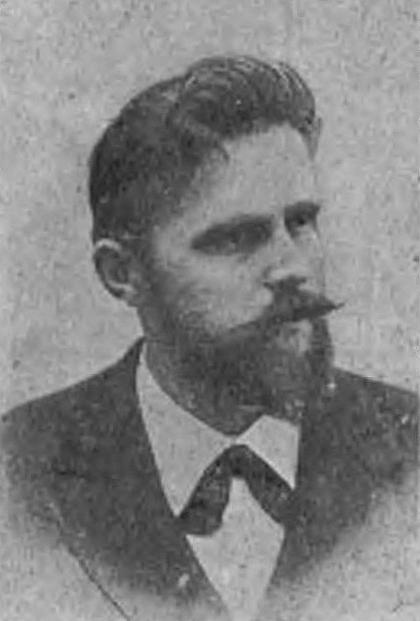
Wacław Wolski

Aniela Pawlikowska was born to a family with a rich literary and scientific heritage. Her mother was Maryla Wolska, a Polish poet, the daughter of Wanda Młodnicka, née Monné, muse and fiancée of the painter Artur Grottger, herself a writer and translator. Her father was Wacław Wolski, engineer, inventor, author on mathematical logic, linguist, an early pioneer of the Polish petroleum industry, and associate of the Canadian petroleum entrepreneur, William Henry McGarvey.

Aniela was the youngest of five children. Her older sister was the writer and poet, Beata Obertyńska.

Aniela was home-schooled. One of her tutors was a family friend, the university professor of philosophy and psychology and artist, Władysław Witwicki. Aniela ("Lela") Wolska's artistic talent was noted early; she held her first solo exhibition at age nine. On that occasion, 54 of her works were exhibited by the Lwów Society of Friends of Fine Art (Towarzystwo Przyjaciół Sztuk Pięknych). Her home education did not conclude with a matriculation examination, so she attended lectures on the history of art given at Lwów University by Professors Bołoz-Antoniewicz and Władysław Podlacha as an auditor.

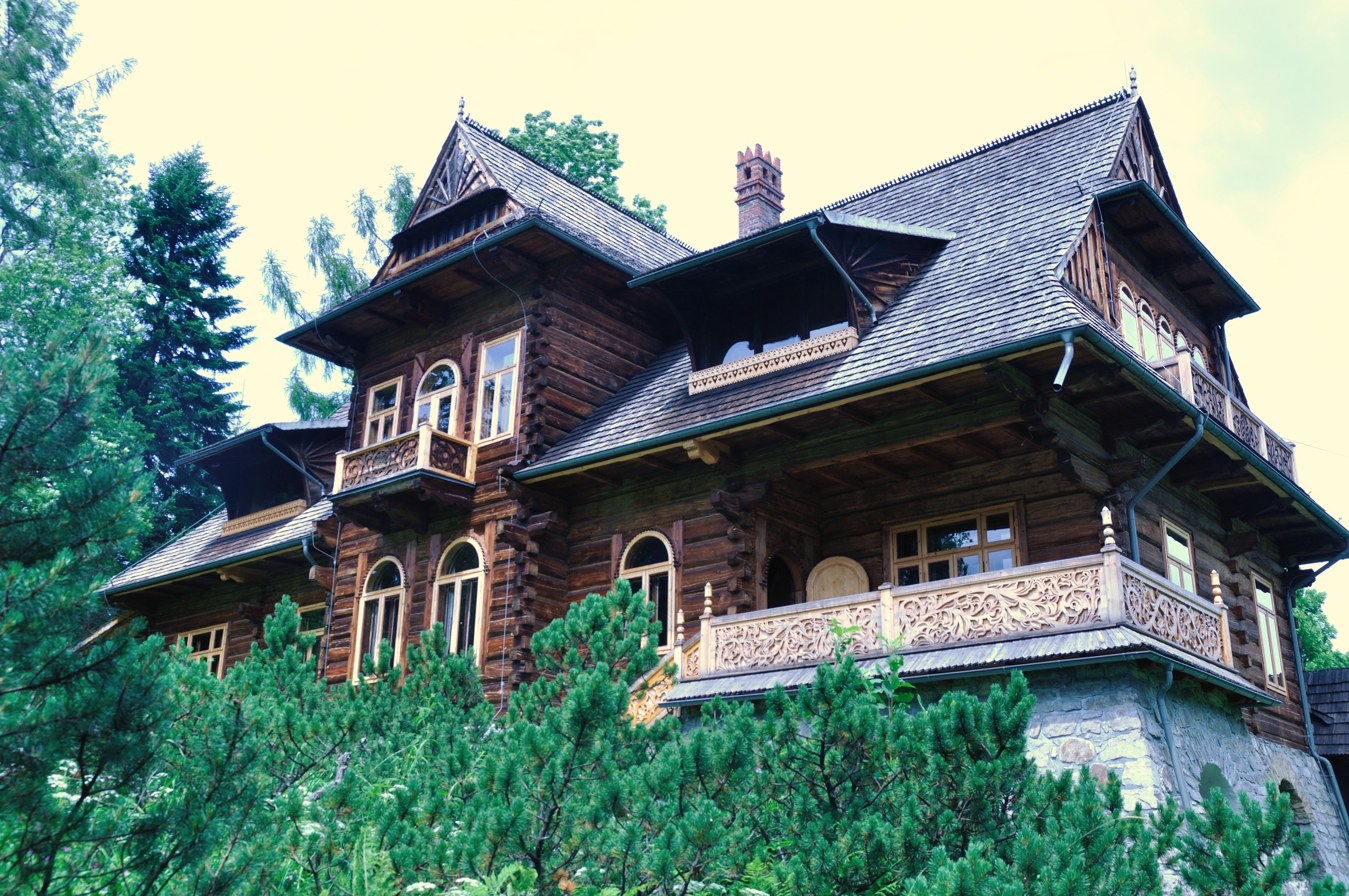
The villa "Pod Jedlami" ("The Firs") in Zakopane

In 1923 Lela Wolska married Michał Gwalbert Pawlikowski, a bibliophile, writer, and publisher. She joined him at the family seat of Medyka, near Przemyśl. "Medyka" was also the imprint her husband's small publishing and printing enterprise which specialised in small runs of literary works for which Lela provided the illustrations. They had three daughters and a son. The family would also spend a lot of time at their mountain chalet, "Pod Jedlami" ("The Firs"), in Zakopane. It had been designed for Michał's father, Jan Gwalbert Pawlikowski, by the modernist artist, Stanisław Witkiewicz. With her husband's active support she continued her studies in art at the Kraków Academy of Fine Arts with Wojciech Weiss and Kazimierz Sichulski.

In the 1930s she exhibited widely in Lwów, Kraków, Warsaw and Zakopane and abroad in Leipzig, Rome, Florence and Turin. With the outbreak of World War II she took her four small children to Lwów where she went to live with her sister in the Wolski villa, known as "Zaświecie". In May 1940 already after the first wave of Soviet deportations of Poles to Siberia, she managed to get a laissez-passer for herself and the children into the Nazi General Government. They were taken in by a relative, the political activist and poet Zofia Kernowa, on her estate in Goszyce. In April 1942, thanks to her husband's intervention, she was able to travel to Italy to join him in Rome.

In Rome she provided for the family by painting portraits of Italian aristocrats and diplomats stationed there. It was also a time of family tragedy when the Pawlikowskis' second daughter died of leukemia. By the end of 1946 the family had moved to London to join the thousands of demobilised allied Polish military personnel who were allowed to settle in the United Kingdom, now that their homeland had been given over to Soviet Ukraine as part of the Yalta Accord. In London she continued to support the family through portrait commissions so that she became one of the most sought after portrait painters in the country.

In 1955 her popularity led to a solo exhibition at London's Parsons Gallery which was deemed one of the cultural events of the year, not least among the Polish emigrant community. Among her sitters were Princess Alexandra of Kent, the daughters of Alfonso XIII and the wartime SOE agent, Krystyna Skarbek. She continued to work virtually to the end of her life, despite losing the sight in one eye. From 1962 she would visit Poland for several months each year and stay in Zakopane in the family chalet. Her husband was killed in a road traffic accident in 1970.

She died in 1980 in a Polish care home, "Antokol" on the outskirts of London. Her ashes were laid to rest in Poland.

=== Fate of Medyka ===
After the Soviet invasion of Poland in 1939, the village of Medyka, and therefore the Pawlikowski estate, found themselves annexed by the Soviet Union. With 1948 border adjustments between the new Polish People's Republic and its neighbour, Medyka found itself once again just over the Polish side of the new border. The Pawlikowski estate became state property and was turned into a State Agricultural Farm (PGR). In the 1960s it was decided to demolish the palace on the grounds that it was a vestige of the earlier "bourgeois hegemony". Fortunately, the family had taken the precaution at the outbreak of war to donate part of its valuable collections to the Ossolineum in Lwów and to take other parts to their chalet in Zakopane. The gamble paid off, as most of the archive managed to survive in scattered form. Pawlikowska and the family never returned to Medyka after the war to see the devastation of the place where they had spent the happiest time of their lives. It was a fate shared by the totality of Polish landowners in the Kresy region of Poland and marked a "caesura" in history and the obliteration not only of a way of life, but also of a centuries-old hugely rich and diverse cultural heritage centred on the city of Lwów.

== Works ==
Given Pawlikowska's creativity may be defined by her highly traditional and conservative background, undoubtedly influenced by her husband's, patriotic and nationalistic views, as the main champion of her work, at a time of deep crisis for the nation coupled with exile in the Free World, she did not seek to join the Avant-garde but sought instead in her own words, to "make links between the basic elements of art and means of expression with her Polishness". Her inspiration coupled with the mature style of her creativity, enable her work to be characterised as art déco style.

=== Illustrations ===
Her public debut, aside from the Juvenilia, were illustrations and graphic designs for a first library edition of her husband's work, Agnieszka albo o Pannie na niedźwiedziu, "Agnes or the Maiden atop the Bear", (Medyka 1925). It was a pastiche on a medieval Incunable, particularly on the Balthasar Behem Codex, well known to her and which inaugurated the publishing venture of the Medyka Library series which until it ceased in 1939, went on to produce 15 richly illustrated titles, generally the work of Pawlikowska. Among her significant contributions were two volumes by Beata Obesityńska, A Guitare and others - Gitara i tamci (Medyka 1926) and The tale of Brothers Frost. A Calendar dream - O Braciach Mroźnych. Sen kalendarzowy (Medyka 1930). Notable were her gouache colour and black and white linocut illustrations for Zofia Kossak-Szczucka's God's Madman - Szaleńcy Boży (Kraków 1929). In London Pawlikowska illustrated over a dozen titles for Veritas, a Polish religious publishing foundation.

=== Religious themes ===
Sacred topics were central to Pawlikowska's creativity, especially of Marian inspiration. Her portfolio of ten linocuts, Bogurodzica (Mother of God), overlain with watercolours and gilded are a reference to folk woodcarvings and paintings on glass. They were published by Medyka in 1930. Commenting on this art déco series, and other single works after the war, Pawlikowska said: "those pictures are on a religious theme, but my aim was to express them in Polish, not drawing on any pattern or style, rather perhaps relying on folk art (...) the point was to reflect the world through the Marian calendar and traditions, for example, Our Lady of Sowing, Our Lady of Berries, Our Lady of Herbs... and also to convey it by the simplest artistic means through line and thereby to confer as much expression as possible". (Note: Our Lady of Berries, Matka Boska Jagodna (feast day, 2nd July), is an example of rural pre-Christian beliefs woven into Polish Catholic lore in the Feast of the Visitation, as a celebration of fertility. According to Polish folklore, the Virgin Mary being with child on her way to visit her cousin, Elizabeth, had only wild berries to eat. So as not to deprive her of food, in rural Poland it was traditionally forbidden to eat fruits of the forest on 2nd July. Matka Boska Jagodna is the patron of pregnant women, especially those with difficulty carrying to term or who had recently miscarried.) A similar intention lies behind the style of the coloured linocut of "St. Hubertus" of 1936.

The period after the war saw the creation of several important religious works by Pawlikowska. Among them are the 1947 depiction of "Saint Stanisław Szczepanowski, bishop and martyr" for the altar of the Marian Fathers' chapel at Fawley Court in Buckinghamshire England, and two paintings whose fate is unknown, one from 1947 the other dated 1962. There are reproductions of "Prayer for the souls in purgatory" (1947) and "Father Maksymilian Kolbe" (1962). Throughout her career, she designed many Christmas and Easter cards.

=== Portraiture and landscapes ===
Pawlikowska devoted her entire life to the study of the human form and to nature. Her sketchbooks were filled with human figures, plants and animals as part of her uninterrupted daily atelier. She was an amateur botanist and an acute observer. Her landscapes, chiefly in watercolour, were initially a throwback to the 19th-century. Later they clearly referred to a growing fascination with Japanese painting and colour experimentation of the Interwar period. A separate chapter in her creative work were the studies of interiors - mainly of the palace in Medyka. After the war, knowing she could never return to her home, she immortalised those interiors from memory substituting artistic style for the eroded detail.

Her portraiture that was to become the mainstay of émigré family life and support for the chalet in Poland, oscillated initially between a style redolent of secessionism and new experiments with colour and form. However, the pressures of wartime and the difficult period in Italy of necessity turned much of her artwork into a commissioned commodity. It gained popularity in high society, but at the price of a reversion into traditional academic art.

From her émigré years, only a handful of works survive that were untainted by the loss of hope of ever returning to her homeland or the increasing strict rigour of having to earn her living. Among them are three still lifes and a painting of roses which are outstanding works contrasting her daily work and mark a loss of the artist's creative freedom. As if painted in haste in fresh oils is the painting "Roses", then in disharmonious colour comes the grotesque "Pinocchio and the doll" (circa 1943), "Black pudding on straw" (1960), and "clay pots" (1970) were the last expressions of the artist's soul. Of her commissions in England, a certain "relic" remains in the form of a pastel drawing of the infant head of the future Diana, Princess of Wales.

== See also ==
- List of Poles

== Bibliography ==
- Świat Leli Pawlikowskiej. Prace z lat 1915-1965. Catalogue of the exhibition in the Kraków National Museum ed. M. Romanowska, Kraków 1997
- Lela Pawlikowska w Medyce, ed. M. Trojanowska, Przemyśl 2002
- Marta Trojanowska. Dama z Medyki z Londynu. Lela Pawlikowska 1901-1980, Przemyśl 2005
- Marta Trojanowska. Dama z Medyki z Londynu. Lela Pawlikowska 1901-1980 Selection of works including oil, woodcut, watercolour and witty illustrations
