= Mieczysław Grydzewski =

Polish historian and journalist

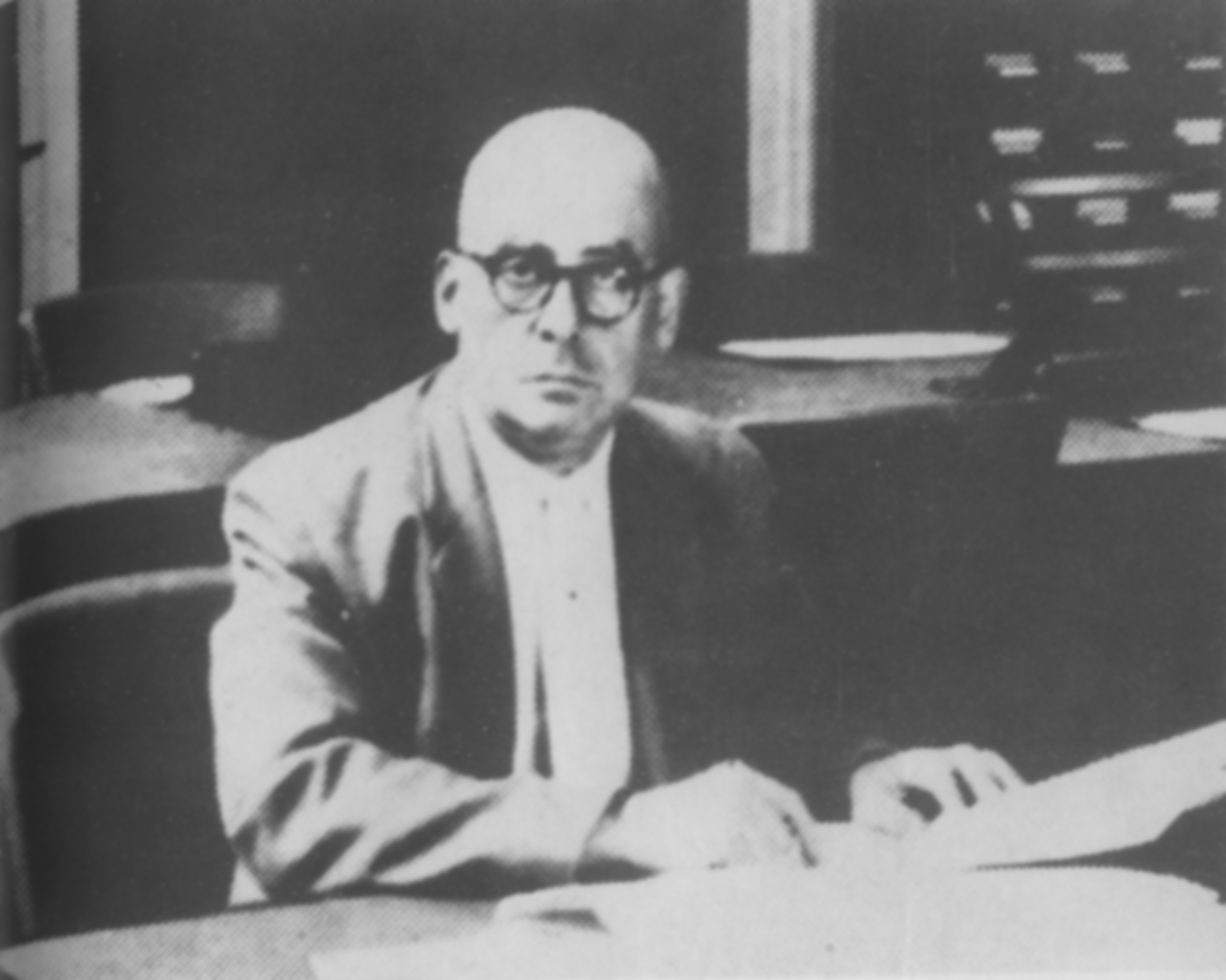
Mieczyslaw Grydzewski, newspaper editor

Mieczysław Grydzewski (27 December 1894 in Warsaw – 9 January 1970 in London) was a Polish historian and journalist, founder and editor-in-chief of Wiadomości Literackie ('The Literary News') weekly. Wiadomości was continued as a major émigré journal during World War II and until 1981. During his life in Poland and abroad, Grydzewski published numerous books, journal articles, compendiums and other works, often anonymously or under assumed names.

Grydzewski was born as Mieczysław Grützhändler into a middle class Jewish family. During World War I, he began to study law at the University of Moscow. At the University of Warsaw, working under the direction of Marceli Handelsman, he obtained a doctorate of philosophical sciences. His 1922 dissertation was on the subject of French-Polish relations during the reign of Stanisław August Poniatowski.

In 1920, during the Polish–Soviet War, together with Jan Lechoń and Julian Tuwim, Grydzewski reported for service at the Press Office of the Polish Supreme Command.

From 1920, Grydzewski published and edited the Skamander monthly. In 1924, together with Antoni Borman, he founded Wiadomości Literackie, the most important Polish literary weekly of the interwar period. From 1926, it had a version for foreign readership, entitled La Pologne Litteraire. In 1936, Grydzewski published the monthly Przyjaciel psa ('Friend of the dog').

At the outbreak of war in September 1939, Grydzewski fled Poland and arrived in France; after France's capitulation he went to the United Kingdom, where he stayed for the rest of his life. In Paris Grydzewski started publishing Wiadomości Polskie, Polityczne i Literackie ('The Polish News, Political and Literary'); Wiadomości Polskie was continued in London. The periodical was restricted by the Polish government-in-exile in September 1941 (for example, its distribution in the Polish Armed Forces was forbidden) because of the published criticism of the Sikorski–Mayski agreement, and closed down by the British authorities (who withdrew its allowance of paper) in February 1944. In 1946, Grydzewski resumed the publication under the title Wiadomości, which he continued with Borman until 1966.

After 1957, Grydzewski established a contest and yearly prize for the best Polish book published outside of Poland and the best work printed in Wiadomości. Wiadomości remained in print until 1981, under the editorship of Stefania Kossowska and the literary prize until 1990.

== Publications ==
- Na 150-lecie rzezi Pragi (4 listopada 1794). O próbie rehabilitacji Suworowa, London 1945
- 150-lecie rzezi Pragi. Włochy: 2. Korpus, 1945
- Silva rerum. Teksty z lat 1947–1969. Gorzów Wielkopolski 1994
- Szkice. Warsaw 1994
