= Beata Obertyńska =

Polish writer and poet (1898–1980)

- Beata Wolska
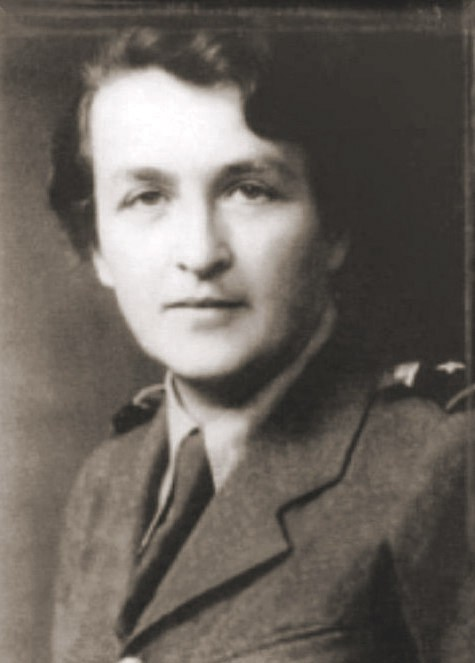
- Born: July 18, 1898 near Skole, Austrian Galicia
- Died: May 21, 1980 (aged 81); London, England
- Education: Państwowy Instytut Sztuki Teatralnej
- Occupations: Poet, writer, actress
- Relatives: Maryla Wolska (mother)
- Writing career
- Pen name: Marta Rudzka
- Genres: Poetry; memoir; drama
- Notable work: W domu niewoli (In the House of Captivity)
- Notable awards: Jurzykowski Prize (1974); Lanckoroński Foundation Award (1972)
- Literary movement: Skamander

Beata Obertyńska (née Wolska;18 July 1898-21 May 1980), who used the pseudonym Marta Rudzka, was a Polish writer and poet.

== Early life and education ==
Beata Wolska was born 18 July 1898, near Skole, Austrian Galicia, the daughter of Young Poland poet Maryla Wolska and Wacław Wolski, an engineer and industrialist in the oil business. She was also the granddaughter of painter Karol Młodnicki and sculptor Wanda Młodnicka (née Monné), the one-time fiancee of painter Artur Grottger, who allegedly encouraged Monné to marry Młodnicki as Grottger was dying.

Wolska spent her childhood and adolescence with her siblings in the family villa in Lviv, where they were home-tutored. She later passed her high school exams. In her youth she was associated with the Skamander movement.

Obertyńska studied acting at the Państwowy Instytut Sztuki Teatralnej.

== Career ==
In 1924, Obertyńska published her first poems in Słowo Polskie then published her first collection, Pszczoły w Słoneczniku (Bees in Sunflowers), in 1927. In the 1930s, she acted and wrote plays for local theatres.

During the Soviet occupation of Lviv in July 1940, Obertyńska was arrested by the NKVD. She was imprisoned in the infamous Brygidki prison and was later moved to prisons in Kyiv, Odessa, Kharkiv, Starobielsk and finally to the Vorkutlag camp. In 1942, following the Sikorski-Mayski Agreement, she was released and joined Anders' Army, where she served as "a nurse [...] and lieutenant in the Polish II Corps in Rome". She served through all of its campaigns in Iran, Palestine, Egypt and Italy.

In 1942, Obertyńska began writing a memoir about her experiences in the labour camps, which was published as W Domu Niewoli in 1946 under the pseudonym Marta Rudzka. The book is "one of the earliest and most important testimonies of life in Soviet labour camps", alongside the work of Polish artist Józef Czapski and Polish writer Herminia Naglerowa.

Later, she published in Polish-language publications, including Dziennik Polski, Dziennik Żołnierza, Orzeł Biały, Polska Walcząca, Ochotniczka, Wiadomości, Życie, and Przegląd Polski. She was a laureate of several literary awards, among them the award of the London-based Przegląd Powszechny (1967) and of the Lanckoroński Foundation (1972), the award of The Polish Ex-Combatants Association (1972), and the Jurzykowski Prize (1974).

== Personal life ==
Obertyńska married Józef Obertyński, a landowner. After Józef's death in 1937, Beata managed the property.

After World War II, Obertyńska settled in London. Her younger sister, Aniela (Lela), married the diplomat and writer Michał Pawlikowski. They too settled in London after the war. Lela was a sought-after portrait painter and produced a portrait of Diana, Princess of Wales, as a child.

In 1980, Obertyńska collapsed on a bus in Putney High Street in London. She died on 21 May.

== Major works ==
=== Poems ===
- Pszczoły w słoneczniku (1927, "Bees in the sunflower")
- Głóg przydrożny (1932, "Hawthorn by the roadside"),
- Otawa. Wiersze dawne i nowe (Jerozolima 1945, "Ottawa. New and Old Poems"),
- Miód i piołun (Londyn 1972, "Honey and Wormwood"),
- Anioł w knajpie (Londyn 1977, "The Angel at the bar"),
- Perły – wiersze (Brighton 1980, "Pearls - poems"),
- Wiersze wybrane (1983, "Selected poems")
- Grudki kadzidła (Londyn, Kraków 1987, "Crumbs of resin")
- Skrząca libella (1991)
- Liryki najpiękniejsze (1999, "Beautiful lyrics")

=== Novels and memories ===
- Gitara i tamci (1926, "They and the guitar")
- Wspomnienia (Quodlibet, 1974, memoirs, together with her mother, Maryla Wolska)
- W domu niewoli (Rzym 1946, "In the house of slavery")
- Skarb Eulenburga (tom 1-2, Londyn 1987-1988, "Eulenburgh's treasure")
