= Medyka =

- Village
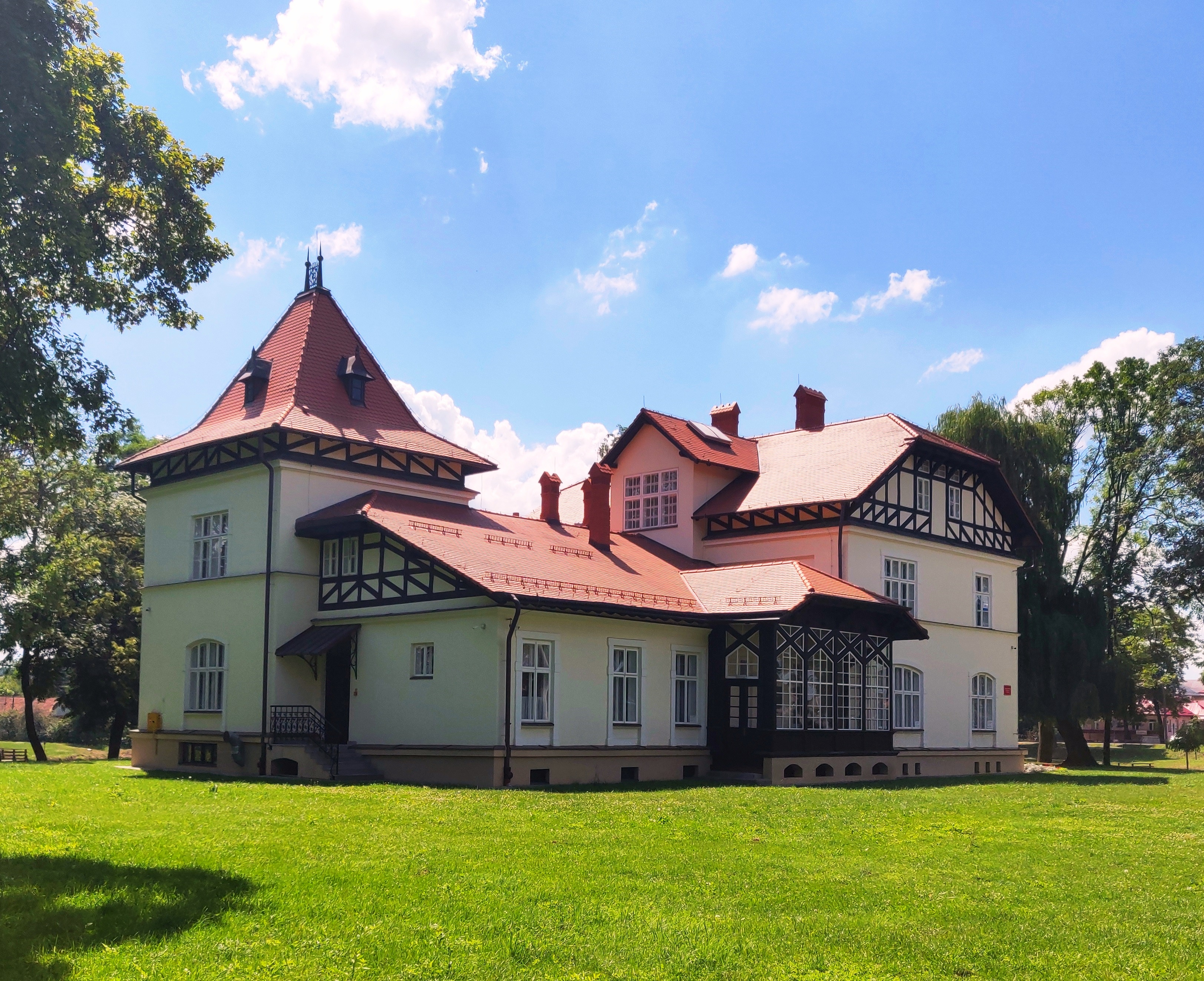
- Historic manor house in Medyka
- Interactive map of Medyka
- Location within Poland
- Coordinates: 49°48′15″N 22°55′55″E
- Country: Poland
- Voivodeship: Subcarpathian
- County: Przemyśl
- Gmina: Medyka

Population
  - Total: 2,800
- Time zone: UTC+1 (CET)
  - Summer (DST): UTC+2 (CEST)
- Vehicle registration: RPR

Medyka ([mɛˈdɨka]) is a village in Przemyśl County, Subcarpathian Voivodeship, in south-eastern Poland, on the border with Ukraine. It is the seat of the municipality (gmina) called Gmina Medyka.

== History ==
The village dates back to the Middle Ages. A castle existed there already in the 14th century. It was expanded in 1542 by Piotr Kmita Sobieński (1477-1553), starosta of Przemyśl. In 1607 the Roman Catholic St Peter and Paul timber church was erected and in 1663 the settlement was granted Starostwo status. There was also a Greek Catholic Church. Medyka was occupied by Habsburg Austria after the First Partition of Poland in 1772 and remained within Galicia until the end of World War I.

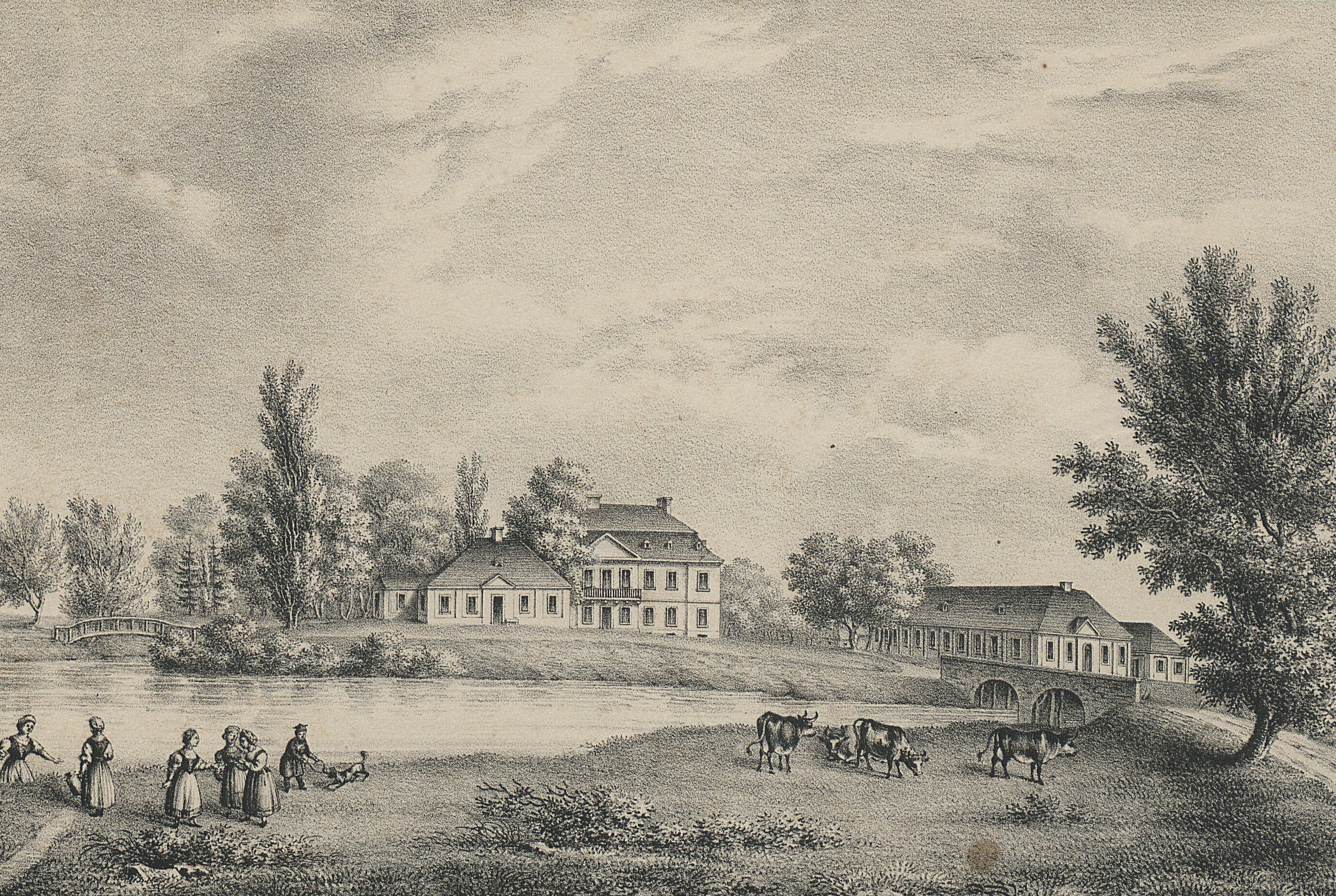
Manor house in Medyka circa 1840

From 1809 the village became the property of the Pawlikowski family. They built a manor house on the ruins of the ancient castle and for generations maintained in their family seat a cultural centre with a valuable library and historical collections. In 1830 Gwalbert Pawlikowski (1793-1852) established on his estate the first school of horticulture in the Kingdom of Galicia and Lodomeria and a dendrological collection in his laid out park. The manor house was damaged both in 1915 and 1939 Fortuitously, part of its cultural heritage was donated to what became the Ossolineum Institute in Wrocław and survived. It includes a single page containing a Polish version of Psalm 50, known as the Karta medycka, from the early 15th century, discovered in Medyka in 1832 by historian and collector, Konstanty Świdziński (1793-1855).

A brick-built rectangular synagogue was erected in the village at the beginning of the 20th century. As its congregation, it was devastated by Nazi German invaders during World War II.

The Polish 23rd Observation Escadrille was stationed in Medyka during the joint German-Soviet invasion of Poland, which started World War II in September 1939. Afterwards the village was occupied by the Soviet Union until 1941, under which it was annexed to the newly formed Drohobych Oblast of the Ukrainian SSR. From 1941, it was occupied by Nazi Germany, and from 1944 by the Soviet Union. The Polish resistance was active in the area. In April 1943, the Home Army successfully raided a German police station in Medyka. It was eventually restored to Poland in 1948 during a revision of borders.

The British society portrait painter and illustrator, Aniela Pawlikowska, was married to the last proprietor of Medyka, Michał Gwalbert Pawlikowski (1887-1970), a bibliophile, writer, and publisher who lived, worked and raised their family there, before being routed from their home by invading forces in World War II. They eventually settled in the United Kingdom. "Medyka" was also the imprint of Pawlikowski's small publishing and printing enterprise which specialised in small runs of literary works for which his artist wife provided the illustrations.

== Border crossing ==
Medyka is one of the main road border crossings between Poland and Ukraine. A major railway line also runs through the village, connecting both countries. The village across the border in Ukraine is Shehyni. During the 2022 Russian invasion of Ukraine, Medyka was one site welcoming Ukrainian refugees who crossed the border.

== Gallery ==
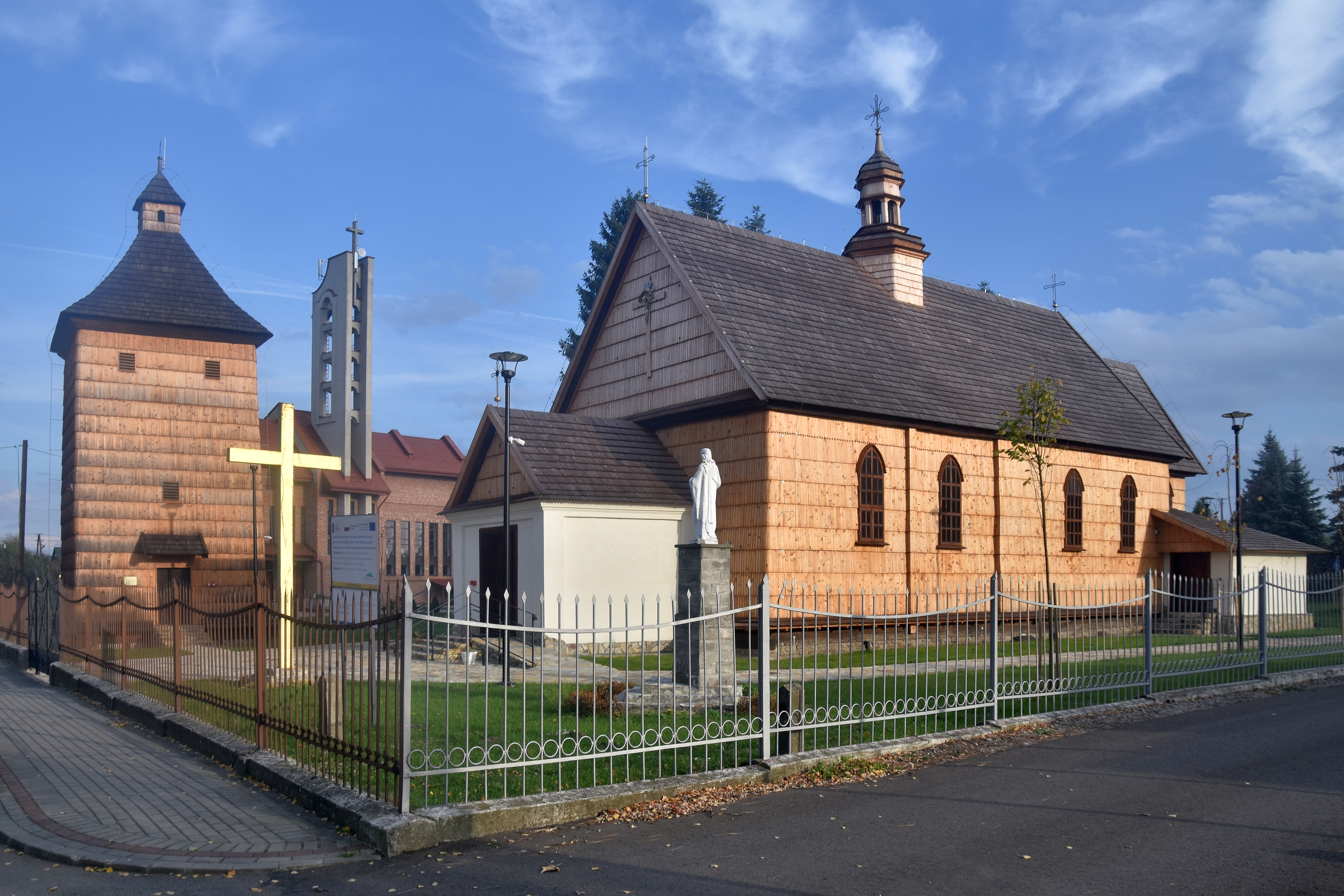
17th century RC timber church of Sts. Peter and Paul

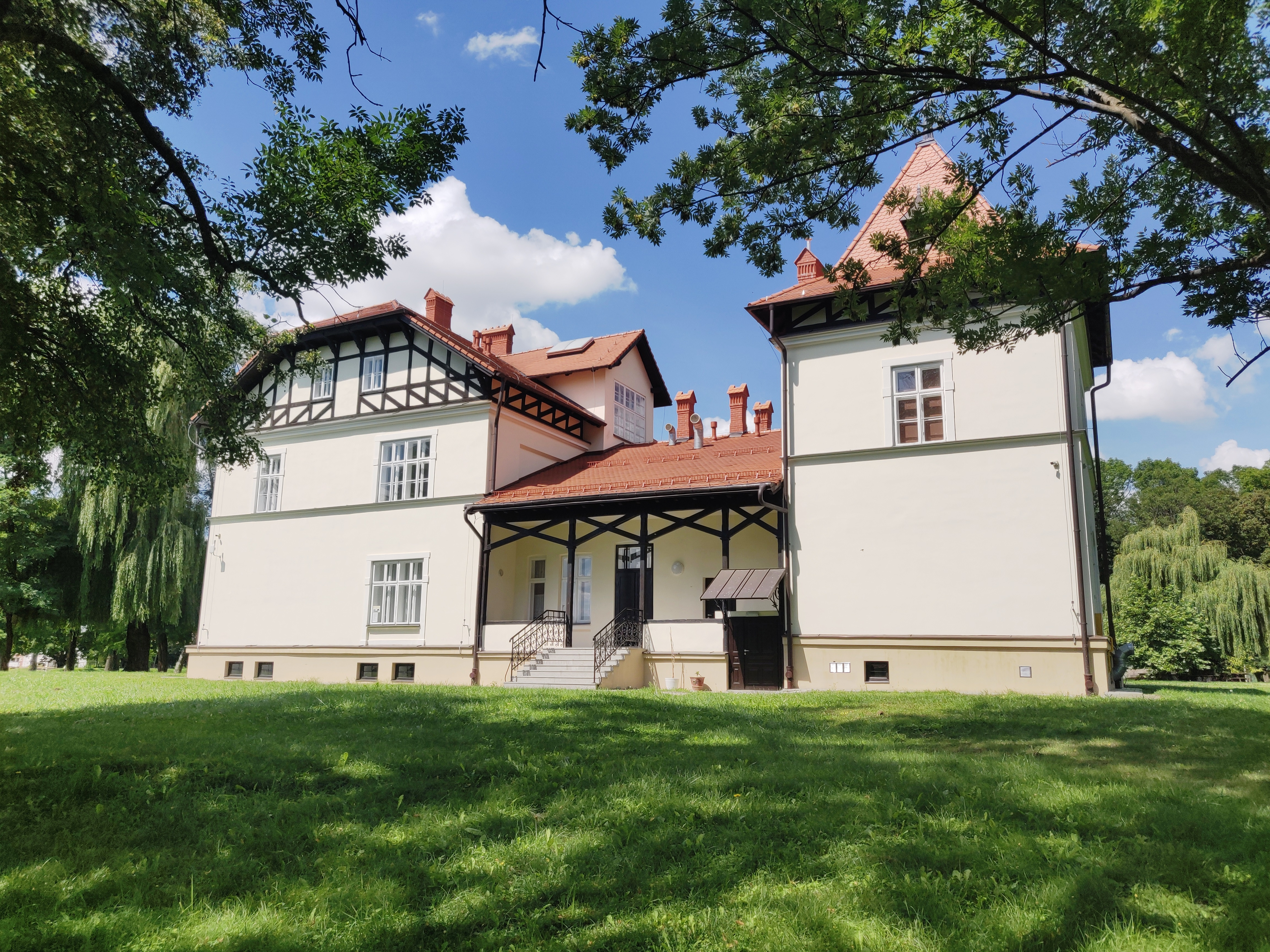
Front of the Pawlikowski Manor house

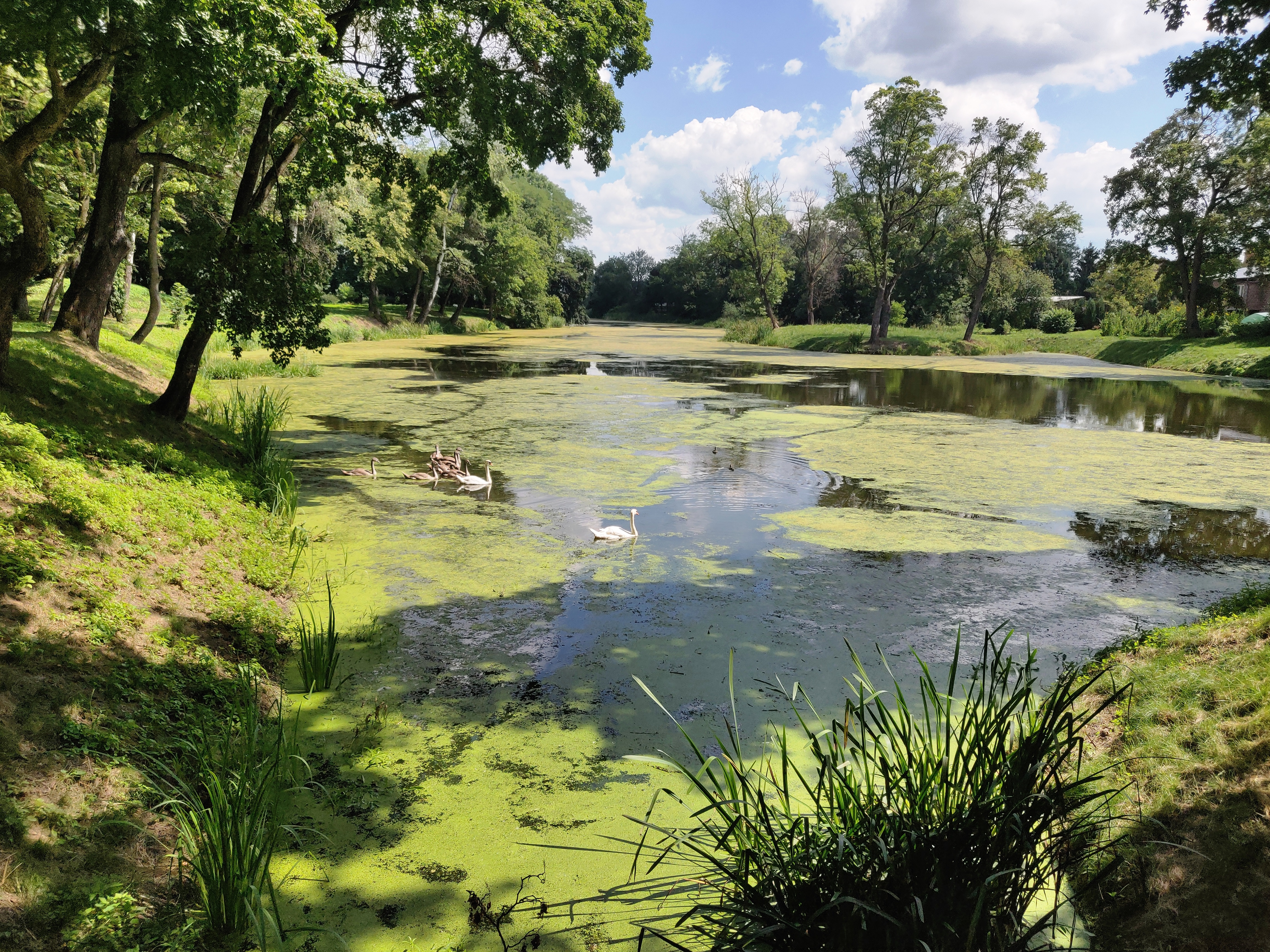
Lake in the Medyka Manor house park

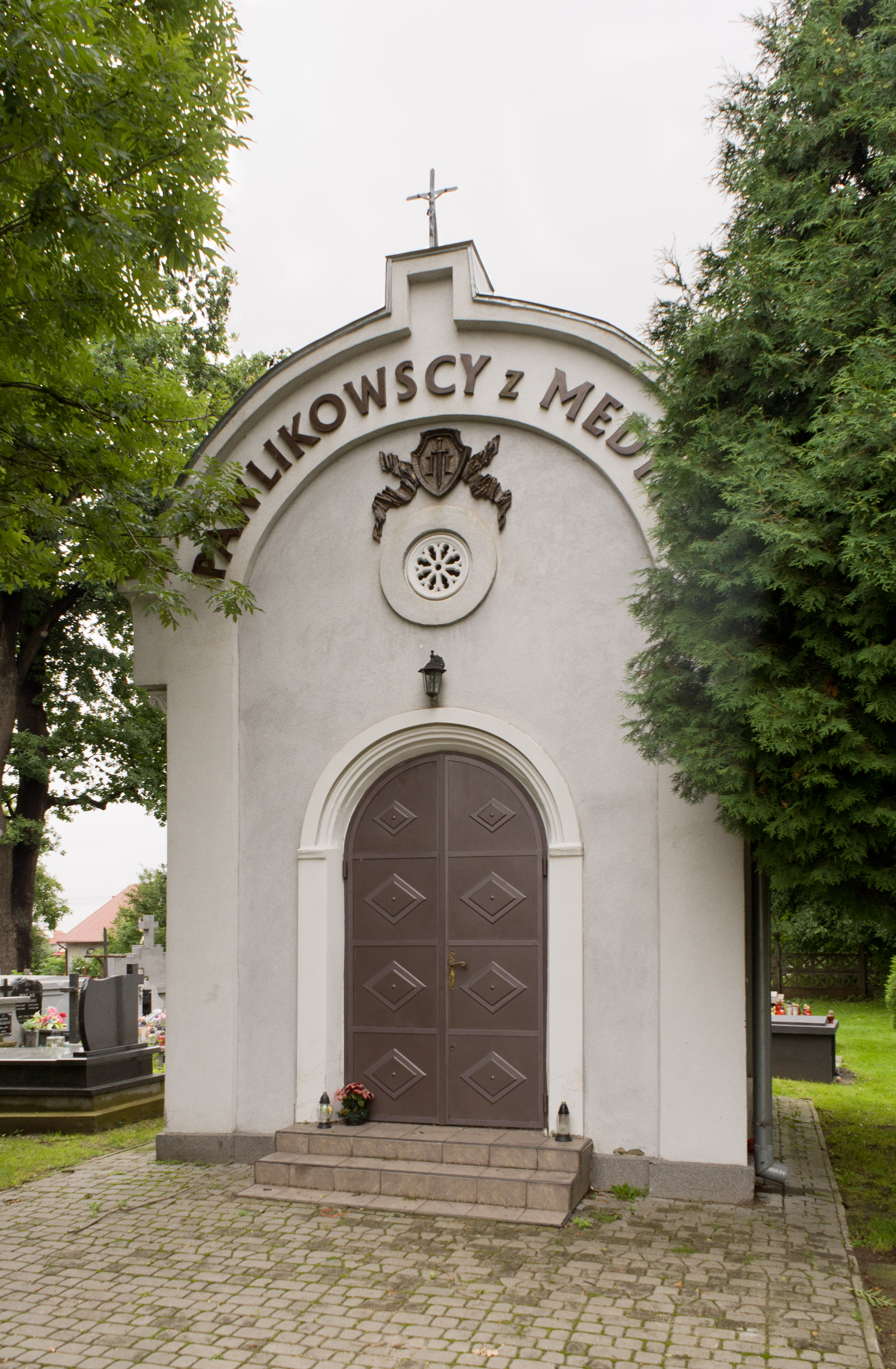
Pawlikowski family mausoleum

== See also ==
- Krościenko, Bieszczady County
