= Anna Frajlich =

Polish-American writer (born 1942)

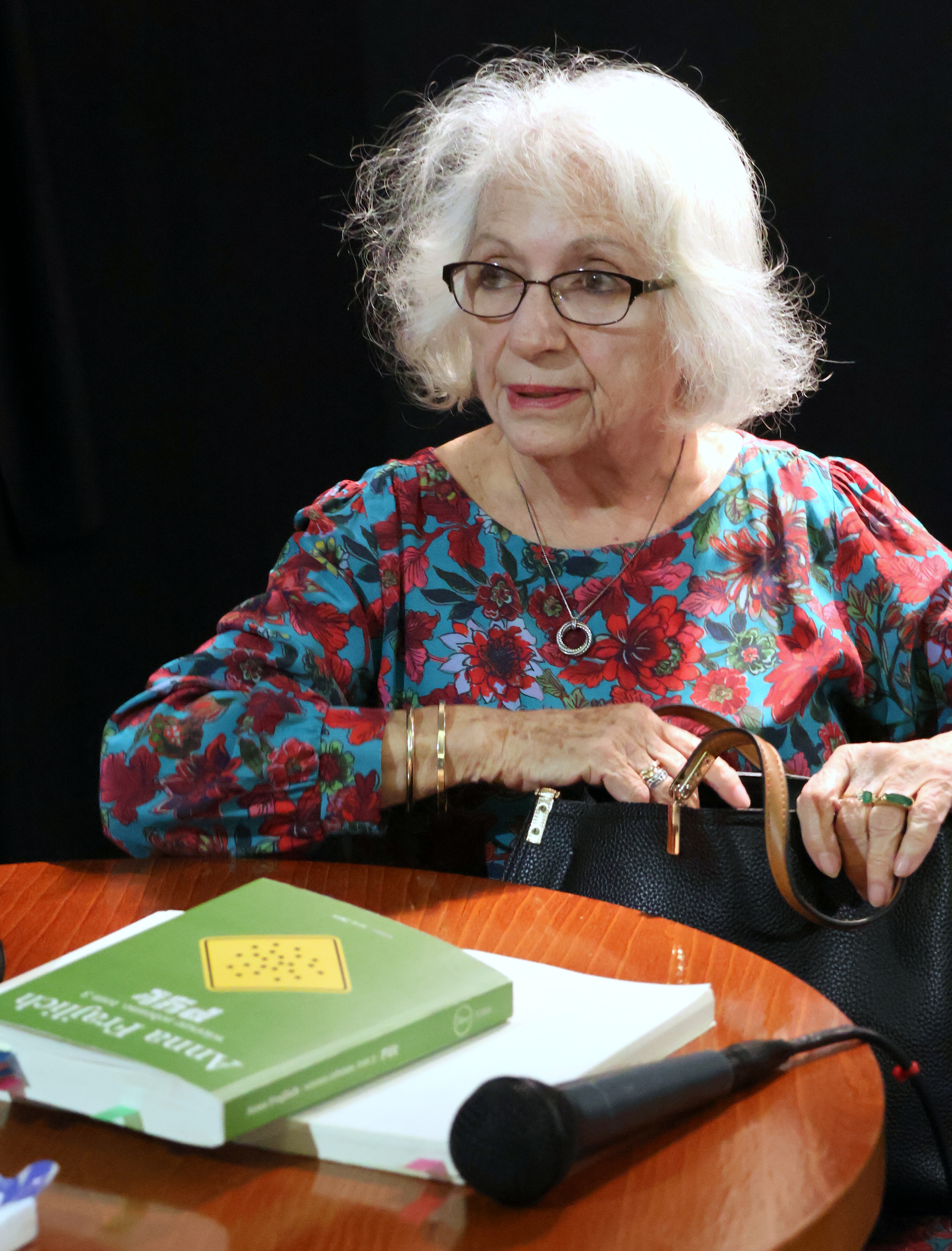
- Born: March 10, 1942 (age 84); Katta Taldyk, Osh Region, Kyrgyzstan
- Education: University of Warsaw
- Occupations: Poet, journalist, scholar, teacher
- Spouse: Władysław Zając (1965–present)
- Children: 1
- Writing career
- Language: Polish
- Years active: 1958–present
- Website: www.annafrajlich.com

Signature
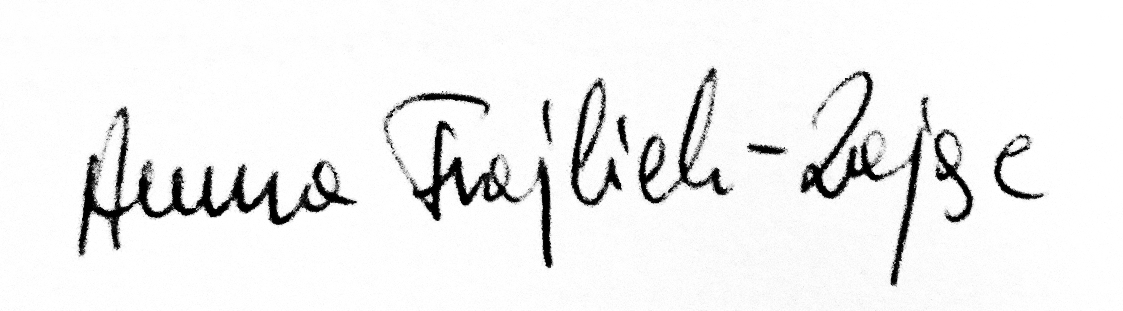

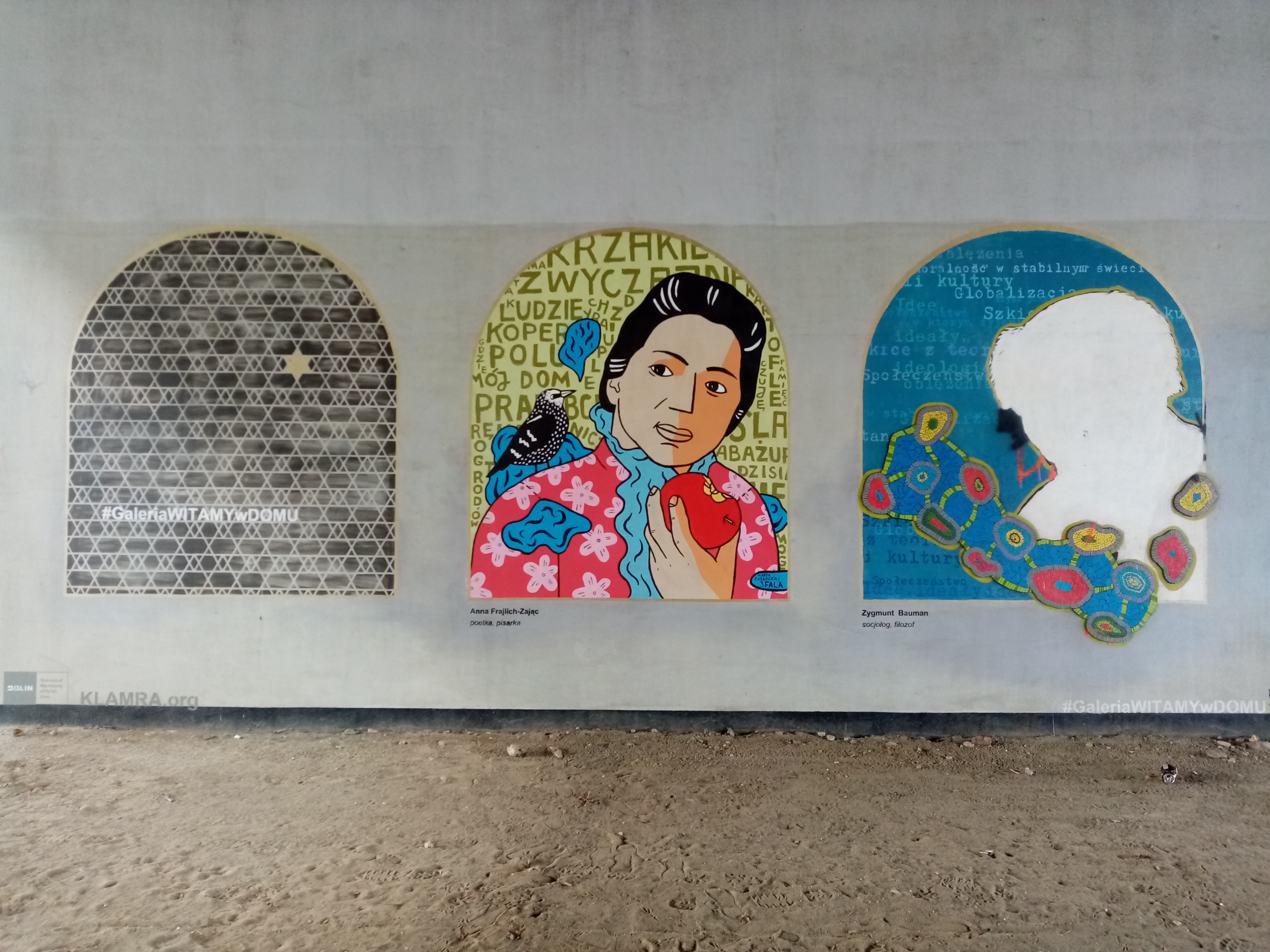
Mural with the image of Anna Frajlich-Zając as part of a gallery of murals commemorating people who left Poland in connection with the events of March 1968 (in the area of the Gdański Railway Station in Warsaw, Poland)

Anna Frajlich (born March 10, 1942), known also as Anna Frajlich-Zając, is a Polish-American poet and a Senior Lecturer Emerita at the Department of Slavic Languages and Associate Faculty Member, Harriman Institute at Columbia University in New York City, where she taught Polish language and literature for over three decades.

== Early life and education ==
Frajlich was born in Kyrgyzstan to a Polish-Jewish family. The family was separated in 1941. Her father, Psachie Frajlich, a technician, found himself in Lysva, in Perm Region, in USSR, while her mother, Amalia, ended up in Kyrgyzstan where Anna was born. The family was able to reunite in Lysva in 1943. After the end of the war of World War II, in 1946, the family returned to Poland and settled in Szczecin.

Frajlich graduated from the University of Warsaw with the master's degree in Polish literature. She studied at the Slavic Department of the New York University where she was awarded a PhD in Russian literature in 1991. Her doctoral thesis "Legacy of Ancient Rome in the Russian Silver Age" was later published as a monograph.

== Career ==
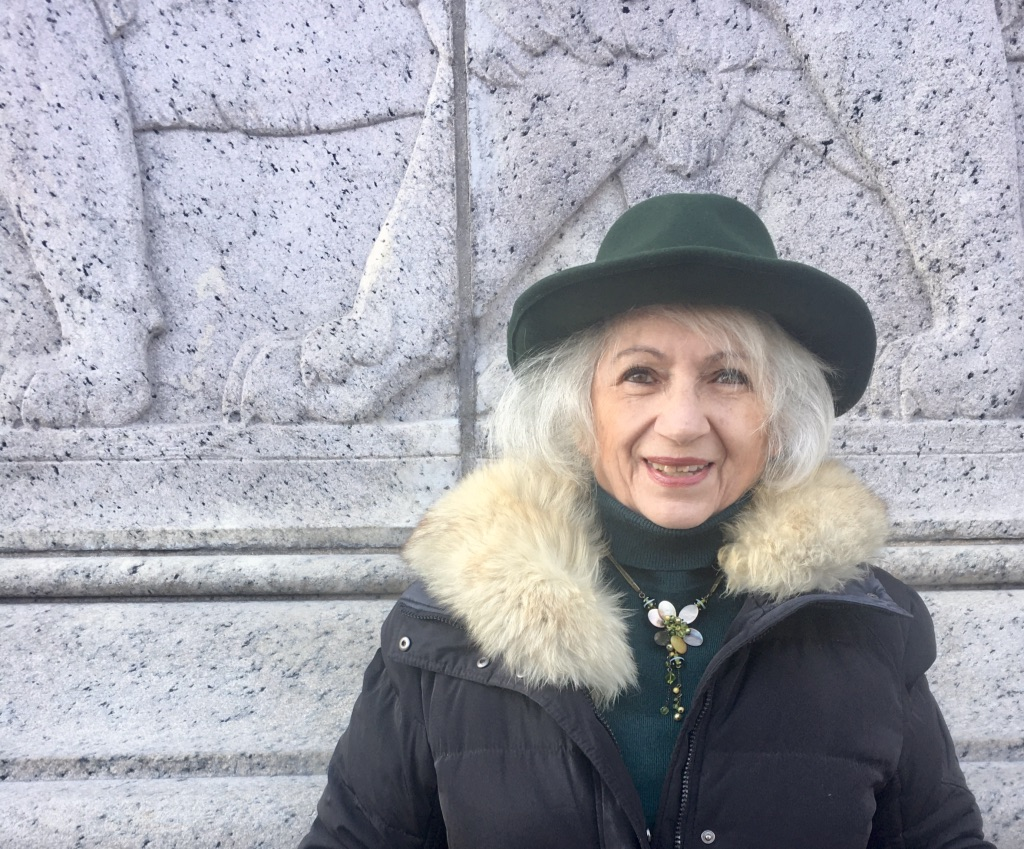
Anna Frajlich in 2021

After completing her master's degree, she worked in publications for visually impaired people. Frajlich, together with her husband, engineer Władysław Zając, and son, emigrated to the United States in 1969, as a part of an emigration wave of Polish Jews in response to the Polish government's antisemitic campaign.

Her first teaching job in the United States was at SUNY Stony Brook, where she taught the Polish language. In 1982, she started teaching Polish language and then literature at Columbia University, where she worked until her retirement in 2016. She started contributing to the Polish émigré press in the United States and Europe. She was also a freelance contributor to the Radio Free Europe, Polish Section. Anna Frajlich was the only Polish journalist from the Radio Free Europe to whom Czesław Miłosz granted an interview after he became the 1980 Nobel Prize winner in Literature.

She started writing and publishing her poetry in 1958 in weekly literary supplements in Warsaw, Szczecin, and Poznań. Her first book of poetry "Aby wiatr namalować" ("To paint the wind") was published in 1976 in England. Her poetry in translation appeared in the US in journals "Mr. Cogito", "Artful Dodge", "Poet Lore", "Terra Poetica" and others since early 1980s.

In 2007, she was named an Honorary Ambassador of Szczecin (in Polish "Ambasador Szczecina").

She has published numerous poetry books, essays, and articles. Her poetry was translated into English, French, Italian, Spanish, Ukrainian and Russian languages. Frajlich is considered "not only a notable émigré poet but, arguably, she is the most prominent Polish woman émigré poet of her generation".

Scholars who study Polish emigre poetry agree that the prevalent focus of her poetry are the "themes of time, change, journeys, exile, home and habituation, tamed landscapes and remembered objects, spaces lost and regained" as well as the "themes of exile, emigration, dislocation, and adaptation to new cultural contexts"

On October 24–25, 2016, the University of Rzeszów, which specializes in the study of post-war Polish émigré literature, hosted a conference "Tu jestem/zamieszkuję własne życie" dedicated to the life and work of Anna Frajlich. The conference was co-sponsored by the Institute of Polish Philology of the Jagiellonian University in Kraków, the most prestigious center of literary studies in Poland. The conference program states, "Frajlich's life and work are a microcosm of the entire twentieth century and bear witness to its tragedies, particularly the Holocaust and the Cold War. Claiming her as one of Poland's most distinguished poets is a paradigmatic revolution in itself, the fusing of exile and homeland".

In 2022, the entire issue of the journal "The Polish Review" (2022, vol. 67, issue 1) was dedicated to her.

== Personal life ==
Frajlich is married to Władysław Zając. She and her family currently live in New York City.

== Bibliography ==
=== Selected books of poetry in Polish ===
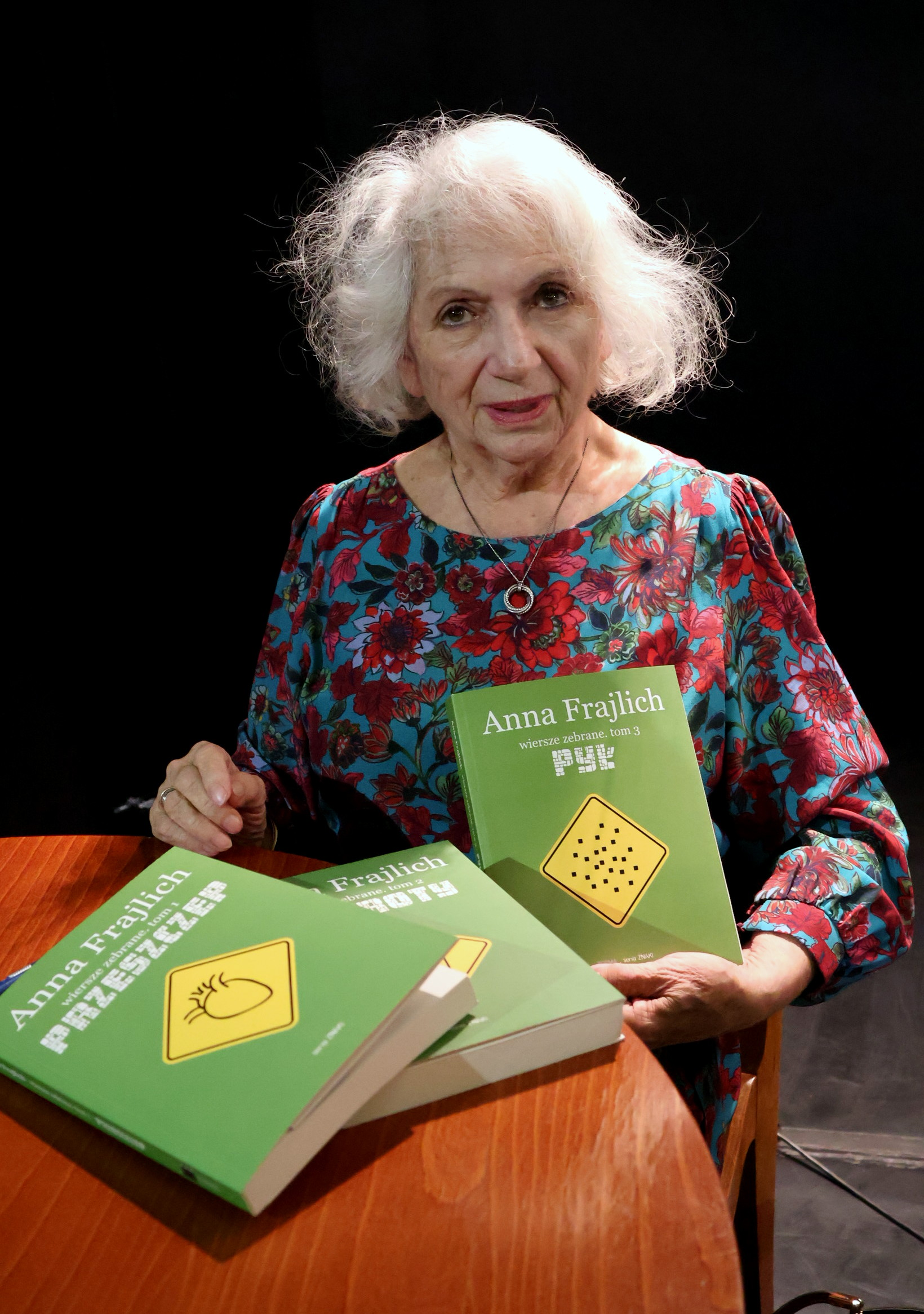
Anna Frajlich-Zając with a three-volume edition of collected poetry in Polish: volumes entitled: Transplant, Returns and Dust (Forma Publishing House, Szczecin-Bezrzecze 2022–2025) - Warsaw, October 21, 2025

- Aby wiatr namalować. London: Oficyna Stanisław Gliwa. 1976. OCLC 297589968.
- Tylko ziemia. London: Oficyna Poetów i Malarzy. 1979. OCLC 7353438.
- Indian Summer. Albany, NY: Sigma Press. 1982. OCLC 18225871.
- Który las. London: Oficyna Poetów i Malarzy. 1986. ISBN 9780948668050. OCLC 13345915.
- Ogrodem i ogrodzeniem. Warszawa: Czytelnik. 1993. ISBN 9788307023687. OCLC 30711944.
- Jeszcze w drodze: wybór wierszy. Warszawa: Niezależna Oficyna Wydawnicza NOWA. 1994. ISBN 9788370540777. OCLC 750691613.
- W słońcu listopada. Kraków: Wydawnictwo Literackie. 2000. ISBN 9788308030424. OCLC 925575071.
- Znów szuka mnie wiatr. Warszawa: Czytelnik. 2001. ISBN 9788307028347. OCLC 47982254.
- Łodzią jest i jest przystanią. Szczecin-Bezrzecze: Forma. 2013. ISBN 9788363316365. OCLC 915463165.
- W pośpiechu rzeka płynie. Szczecin-Bezrzecze: Wydawnictwo Forma; Dom Kultury 13 Muz. 2020. ISBN 9788366180468. OCLC 1192545464.
- Wiersze zebrane. t. 1, Przeszczep. Toronto: Polski Fundusz Wydawniczy w Kanadzie. 2022. ISBN 9788366759626. OCLC 1338056934.
- Wiersze zebrane. t. 2, Powroty. Toronto: Polski Fundusz Wydawniczy w Kanadzie. 2022. ISBN 9788366759640. OCLC 1338045584.
- Frajlich, Anna (2024). Odrastamy od drzewa. Szczecin: Wydawnictwo FORMA. ISBN 9788368215168.
- Frajlich, Anna (2025). Wiersze zebrane. t. 3, Pył. Szczecin: Wydawnictwo FORMA. ISBN 9788368215588.

=== Selected books of poetry in translation ===
- Between dawn and the wind: selected poetry. Translated by Grol-Prokopczyk, Regina. Austin, TX: Host Publications. 1991. ISBN 9780924047046. OCLC 612317540.
- Le Vent, à nouveau me cherche = Znów szuka mnie wiatr (in French and Polish). Translated by Carls, Alice-Catherine. Soisy-sur-Seine (Essonne): Editinter. 2003. ISBN 9782914227889. OCLC 401782302.
- Un Oceano tra di noi (in Italian and Polish). Translated by Wyrembelski, Marcin. Maddaloni, Italy: La Parlesia. 2018. ISBN 9788885710009. OCLC 1310147487.
- El tiempo no es un collar de perlas: poesía (in Spanish and Polish). Translated by Bortkiewicz, Elzbieta. Zaragoza, Spain: Sibiriana Ediciones. 2021. ISBN 9788494871573. OCLC 1262507351.
- Ім'я батька (in Ukrainian). Translated by Makhno, Vasyl. Ternopìl': Krok. 2021. ISBN 9786176926450. OCLC 1303143729.

=== Selected books of prose ===
- Frajlich, Anna, ed. (2001). Between Lvov, New York and Ulysses' Ithaca: Józef Wittlin: poet, essayist, novelist. Toruń: Nicolaus Copernicus University. ISBN 9788323112464. OCLC 469638441.
- Frajlich, Anna (2007). The legacy of Ancient Rome in the Russian Silver Age. Amsterdam: Rodopi. ISBN 9789042022515. OCLC 237144580.
- Kossowska, Stefania (2007). Definicja szczęścia. Listy do Anny Frajlich 1972–2003. Archiwum Emigracji: Źródła i materiały do dziejów emigracji polskiej polskiej po 1939 roku (in Polish). Toruń: Wydawnictwo Naukowe Uniwersytetu Mikołaja Kopernika. ISBN 978-83-231-2073-5. Posthumously published letters to Anna Frajlich 1972–2003.
- Bromberg, Felicja; Frajlich, Anna; Zając, Władysław (2008). Po Marcu—Wiedeń, Rzym, Nowy Jork. Warszawa: Stowarzyszenie Midrasz. ISBN 9788392443278.
- Frajlich, Anna (2010). Laboratorium. Szczecin: Forma. ISBN 9788360881613. OCLC 690106291.
- Frajlich, Anna (2011). Czesław Miłosz. Lekcje: prywatny hołd. Szczecin-Bezrzecze: Forma. ISBN 9788360881743. OCLC 800628719.
- Frajlich, Anna (2020). Meyer, Ronald (ed.). The ghost of Shakespeare: collected essays. Brookline, MA: Academic Studies Press. ISBN 9781644694718. OCLC 1163936108.
- Frajlich, Anna (2023). Szymborska. Poeta poetów (in Polish). Szczecin: Forma. ISBN 978-83-67460-74-3.
- Frajlich, Anna (2025). Szklany sufit języka : Trzynaście rozmów (with Sławomir Jacek Żurek). Kraków: Austeria. ISBN 9788378666622.

== Awards ==
- Kościelski Foundation (Geneva) Literary Award, 1981
- Knight's Cross of Order of Merit, 2002
- W. & N. Turzanski Foundation (Toronto) Literary Prize, 2003
- Honorary Ambassador of Szczecin (Ambasador Szczecina)
- Union of Polish Writers in Exile (London) Literature Prize, 2015
- Wybitny Polak (Distinguished Pole in the United States), 2017
- Jubilee Medal of the John Paul II Catholic University of Lublin, Poland, 2020
- Szczecin University Medal, Poland, 2020
- The Susanne Lotarski Distinguished Achievement Award, 2020
- The Oscar Halecki Prize, 2021
- Wschodnia Fundacja Kultury Akcent, Lublin, Poland, 2022
