= Maryla Wolska =

Polish poet

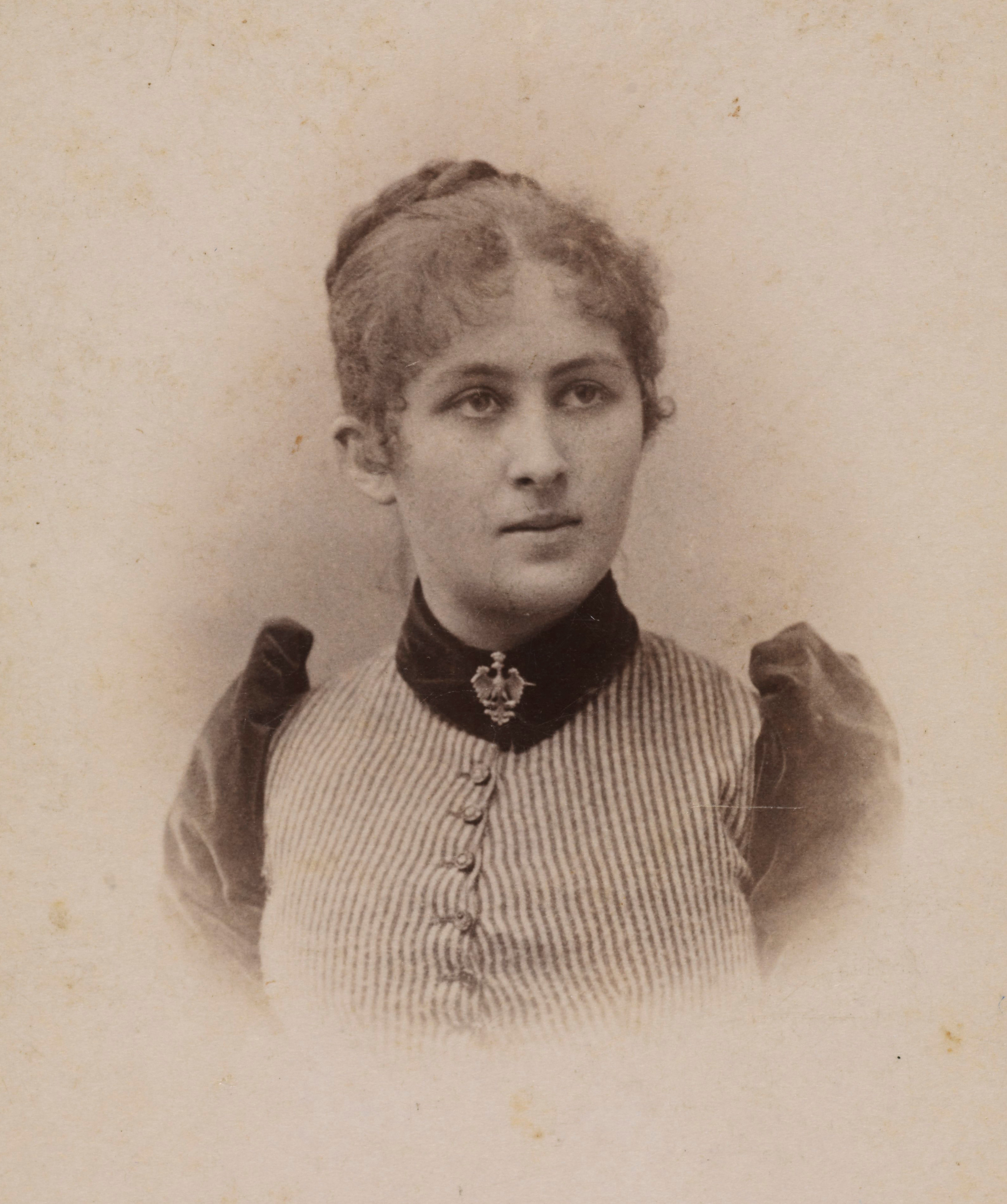

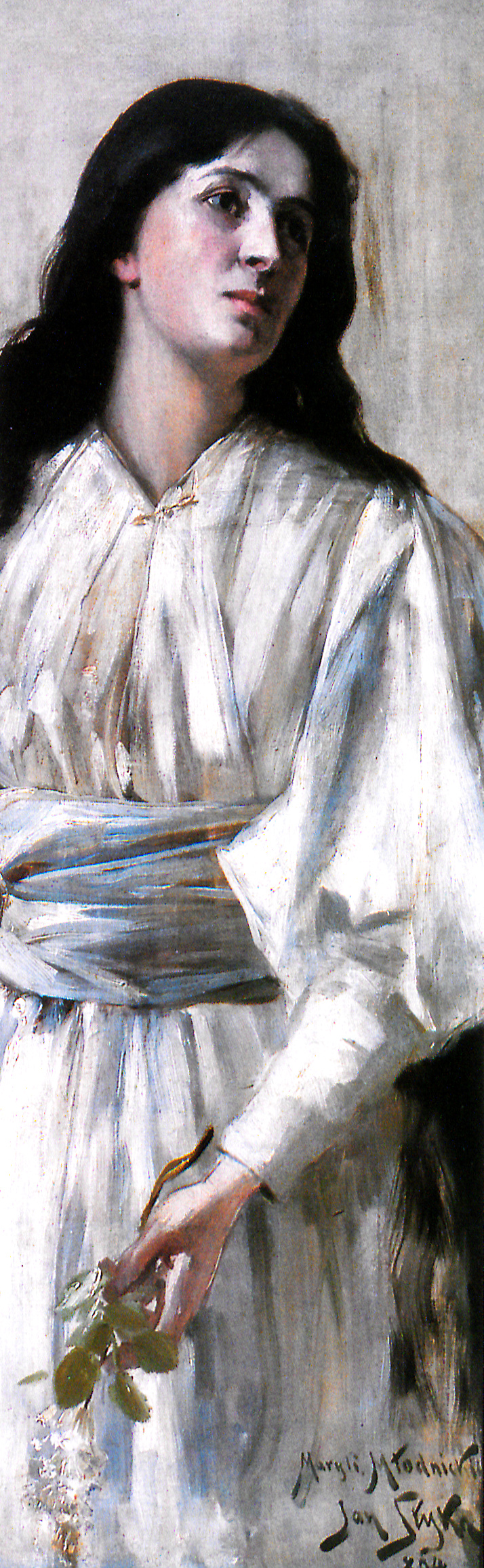
Jan Styka's 1894 portrait of Maryla Wolska

Maryla Wolska (13 March 1873 – 25 June 1930) was a Polish poet of the Young Poland movement. Her pen name was Iwo Płomieńczyk. She was the mother of writer, Beata Obertyńska and of the painter and illustrator, Aniela Pawlikowska.

== Bibliography ==
- Thème Varié, Lwów 1902
- Symfonia Jesienna, Lwów 1902
- Święto Słońca, Lwów 1903
- Z Ogni Kupalnych, Skole 1903
- Swanta, Lwów 1909
- Dziewczęta Lwów 1910
- Arthur i Wanda, Medyka 1928, which concerns Artur Grottger and his fiancée Wanda Monné
- Dzbanek malin, Medyka 1929,
