= Herminia Naglerowa =

Polish writer

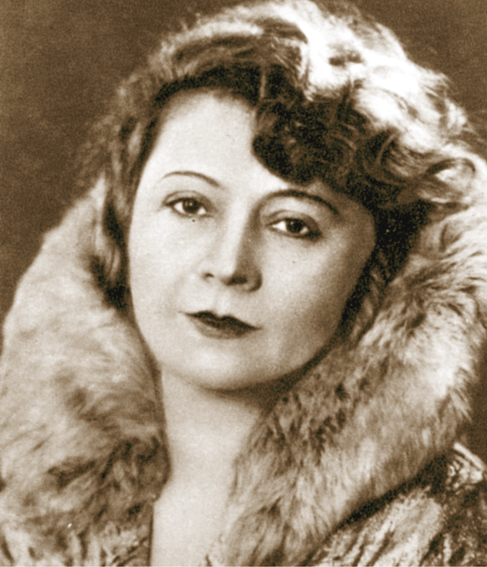
- Portrait
- Born: Herminia Naglerowa; 28 October 1890; Poland
- Died: 9 October 1957 (aged 66); London, U.K.
- Education: University of Lwów (PhD)
- Occupations: Writer and publicist

Herminia Naglerowa nee Fisch (born 28 October 1890 in Zaliski near Brody, died 9 October 1957 in London) was a Polish writer and publicist. In the youth she wrote poems under the pen name Jan Stycz.

Naglerowa studied history at the University of Lwów where she got her PhD. Subsequently she worked as a teacher, at first (1919) in Warsaw. Her first poems were published in Viennese Kurier Polski in 1915. She also became known for her prose works, Czarny pies (1924, "The Black Dog") and Matowa Kresa (1929) in which she combined realism with expressionism. She wrote the trilogy Krauzowie i inni (1930) ("The Family Krauz and others") which depicted the saga of a Galician family in the aftermath of the January Uprising. She also wrote youth literature; Ludzie prawdziwi ("Real People", 1935).

After the attack of Nazi Germany on Poland she moved back to Lwów, which soon came under Soviet occupation. She was arrested by the NKVD in 1940 and sent to a Gulag labor camp detachment of Karlag in Burma, Kazakhstan.

She was released as a result of the Sikorski-Mayski Agreement signed between the Soviet Union and the Polish government-in-exile, and volunteered for the Anders Army, Media and Propaganda department of the Women's Auxiliary Service. Along with the army she left the Soviet Union in 1942. With the rank of corporal and later that of captain, she was present at all the battles of the Anders army (with Polish Armed Forces in the East and II Corps), in Itran, Iraq, Papestine and Italy. Since 1943 she was the editor of the army's newspapers.

After the end of the war, in 1947 she did not return to then communist Poland but settled in Great Britain. She was vice president of the Union of Polish Writers Abroad and the first recipient of the 1951 award of the Union. She wrote several novels based on her own experiences, Ludzie sponiewierani (1945, "Oppressed People"), Kazachstańskie noce (1958, "Kazakh Nights"), and "Sprawa Józefa Mosta" (1953, "The Case of Józef Most"). "Wspomnienia o pisarzach" (1960, "Memories of writers") and Wierność życiu (1967, "True to Life") were published posthumously.

In 1959, the Union of Polish Writers Abroad endowed a prize in her name according to her testament.

Her grave is located in the North Sheen Cemetery.

== Works ==
- Krauzowie i inni, Nakł. Oddziału Kultury i Prasy 2. Korpusu A.P., 1946
- Sprawa Jósefa Mosta, Gryf Publishers, 1953
- Loves and ambitions, Roy Publishers, 1954
- Mickiewicz żywy, 1955
- Wyspiański żywy, 1957
- Wierność życiu, Nakł. Polskiej Fundacji Kulturalnej, 1967
- Kazachstańskie noce, London, Biblioteka Polska Ośrodka Wydawniczego "Veritas", 1958

== See also ==
- Beata Obertyńska
