= Aylesford Priory =

Monastery in Kent, England

Coordinates: 51°18′10″N 0°28′17″E

- The Friars, Aylesford
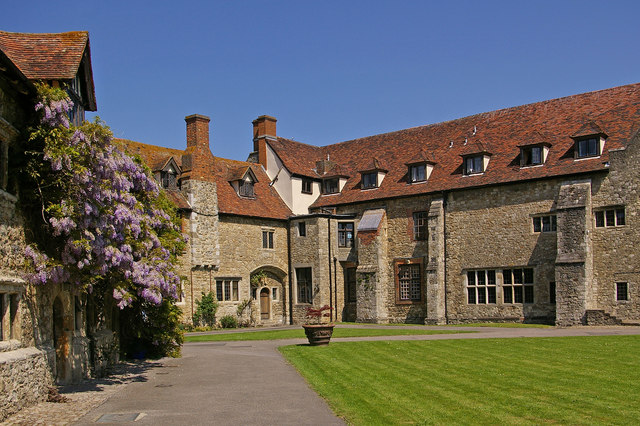
- Inner courtyard of the Priory

- Location within Kent

History
- Built: 13th, 15th century

Site notes
- Architect: Adrian Gilbert Scott
- Restored by: Fr. Malachy Lynch
- Governing body: Roman Catholic Archdiocese of Southwark
- Owner: Carmelite Order

Listed Building – Grade I
- Official name: The Friars, Main Block
- Designated: 25 August 1959
- Reference no.: 1070570

Listed Building – Grade I
- Official name: Gatehouse and Wall to the NE
- Designated: 25 February 1987
- Reference no.: 1111775

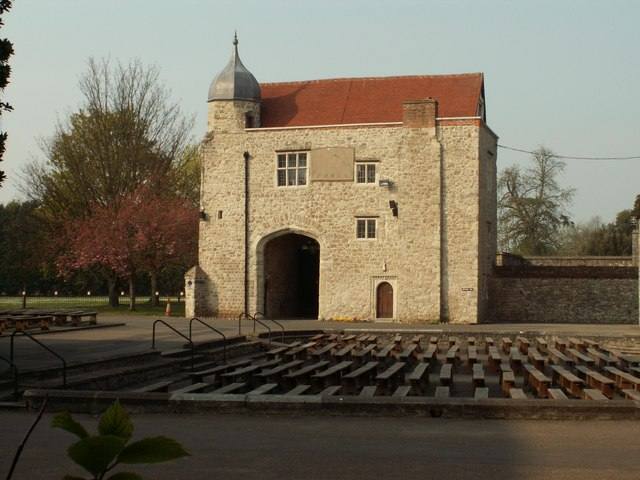
The old gatehouse at the Friars

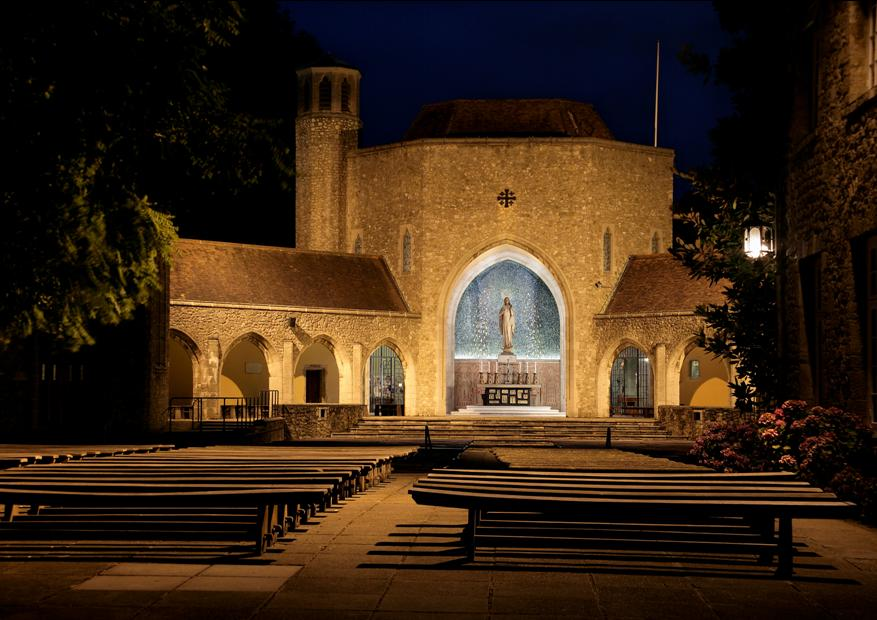
Shrine at night

Aylesford Priory, or "The Friars" was founded in 1242 when members of the Carmelite order arrived in England from Mount Carmel in the Holy Land. Richard de Grey, a crusader, sponsored them, and conveyed to the order a parcel of land located on his manor in Aylesford in Kent. The estate came back into the ownership of the Carmelite order in 1949. After refurbishment, which revealed 15th century remnants, the manor house was Grade I listed in 1959. After subsequent work on site, the 15th century gatehouse and the NE section of the wall were also Grade I listed on 25 February 1987. The priory now contains an array of contemporary artworks by notable artists. It is a pilgrimage destination of national significance, especially the shrine containing relics of St Simon Stock.

== History ==
The Carmelites first came to Kent in the 13th century. Richard of Wendover, then Bishop of Kent, recognised the Carmelite foundation at Aylesford and the first General Chapter of the order, outside of the Holy Land, was held there. The Chapter changed the lifestyle of the Carmelites from hermits to mendicant friars.

As a result of the English Reformation, the Carmelites were forced out of the property in 1538. Over the next four centuries, the buildings were repurposed, including their use as an "opulent, stately home". Following a fire in 1930, restoration work was required, during the course of which, many of the original features were revealed. In 1949, the property was offered for sale. This gave the Carmelites the opportunity to purchase their first motherhouse, and use it for its original purpose, as a place of worship.

Additional restoration work commenced, including plans to construct the Shrine. Construction began in 1958, with renewed interest in The Friars, after the distraction of the war years. The first Prior, Fr. Malachy Lynch, a charismatic figure, inspired people with the words: "Courage to Build Anew". In the presence of Cardinal Heenan, Archbishop Cyril Cowderoy rededicated the completed Shrine in 1965.

== Art at The Friars ==
The Friars features a wide variety of modern-day religious artwork, including sculptures, paintings, stained glass and ceramics.

=== Sculpture ===
Philip Lindsey Clark was both the son of a sculptor and the father of a sculptor. His commissions include work in Westminster Cathedral, other churches, and several War Memorials. As Chair of the Religious Artist Guild, he introduced to The Friars, both his son, Michael Clark, and Adam Kossowski.

Michael Clark is known mainly for his religious sculptures. He was commissioned to create the small statues located over the doorways of the Courtyard. He received the Otto Beit Medal for Sculpture for his statue of the Glorious Assumption.

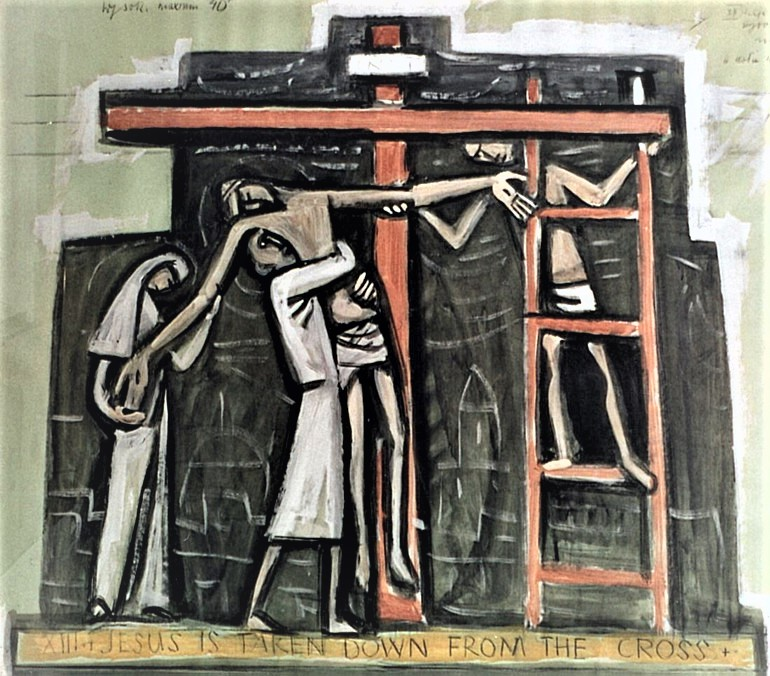
13th Station of the Cross by Adam Kossowski

Adam Kossowski was born in Poland in 1943, and studied in the Jan Matejko Academy of Fine Arts, Cracow and Academy of Fine Arts in Warsaw. He began work at Aylesford in 1950. Kossowski's first major commission was by Fr. Malachy Lynch, then prior at Aylesford, to produce the seven-panel History of the Carmelites of Aylesford in tempera.

Kossowski's first large ceramic project, a Rosary Way, was an Aylesford commission. When Kossowski suggested that he may not be "the man who should do that", Fr. Malachy replied, "Adam, I am sure Our Lady has sent you here for that purpose. When the Rosary Way was successfully completed, Kossowski received "the biggest ceramic commission that I ever had till then", The Vision of St. Simon Stock.

Kossowski's creative relationship with the Aylesford Carmelites lasted from 1950 to 1972, and he created for them approximately one hundred distinct pieces of art "in ceramic, tempera and oil painting, mosaic, wrought iron, and stained glass."

=== Stained glass windows ===
Moira Forsyth was one of the outstanding stained glass artists of the last century. The Flos Carmeli window was a personal gift of the artist, given to celebrate her reception into the Catholic Church in the Cloister Chapel on the Feast of Our Lady's birthday, 1957. The "Flos Carmeli" (Flower of Carmel) is the first line of a hymn that Carmelites sing to Our Lady.

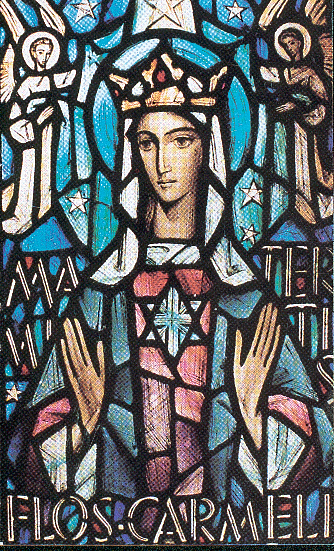
Flos Carmeli by Moira Forsyth in the Cloister Chapel

Dom Charles Norris is responsible for the windows in the Relic Chapel. The windows in the side chapel were designed by Norris. Norris used a style of stained glass called 'dalles de verre' in which 'tiles' of coloured glass are chipped into shape and laid, mosaic-fashion, in a matrix of resin.

Adam Kossawski designed the windows in the body of the chapel.

Hartley Wood Glass of Sunderland, made a number of windows: the diamond-designed windows in the Choir Chapel; the tribune of the Relic Chapel and St. Joseph's Chapel; the Spring of Faith windows in St. Anne's Chapel and the gold, brown and orange tinted windows in the old Convent Chapel.

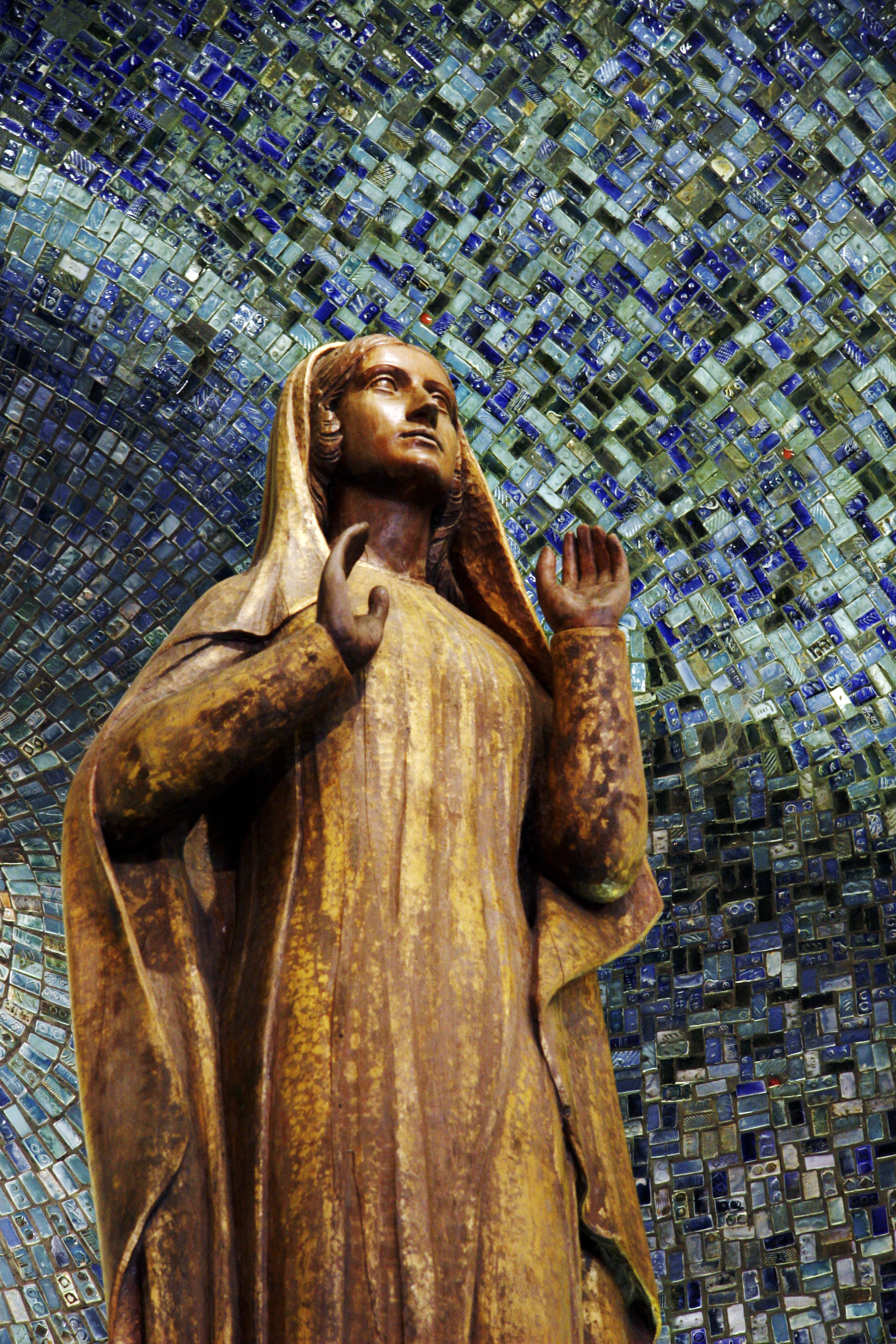
Virgin of the Glorious Assumption by Michael Clark

== Shrine ==
Adrian Gilbert Scott, the architect of the Shrine, was a member of the family who have been described as "the family who built Gothic Britain". His older brother was Giles Gilbert Scott and their father was George Gilbert Scott Jr.

The medieval building comprises the Prior's Hall; two walks of the Cloisters; the Cloister Chapel and the Courtyard with the Pilgrims' Hall, which stands beside the River Medway.

Behind the Shrine is the Rosary Way, which is near the Peace Garden.

== Barns ==
There are two restored barns by the main entrance one of which houses the Tearoom and Giftshop. This barn dates to the seventeenth century.

== Pottery ==
Aylesford Pottery was founded in 1953 by David Leach, a recent catholic convert, as a Malachy Lynch project in part to benefit the Priory. It continues to be located in the precincts of the Priory and remains one of the few surviving commercial craft potteries in the southeast of England.

== Burials ==
- Mazilia (or Marcelin/Mascelin) de Braci, wife of William de Cantilupe (died 1239)
- Simon Stock
- Sir Richard de Grey, 1st Lord Grey (of Codnor)
- Adam Kossowski
- Stefania Kossowska
