= History of the Old Kent Road =

Mural by Adam Kossowski

The History of the Old Kent Road
- History of the Old Kent Road
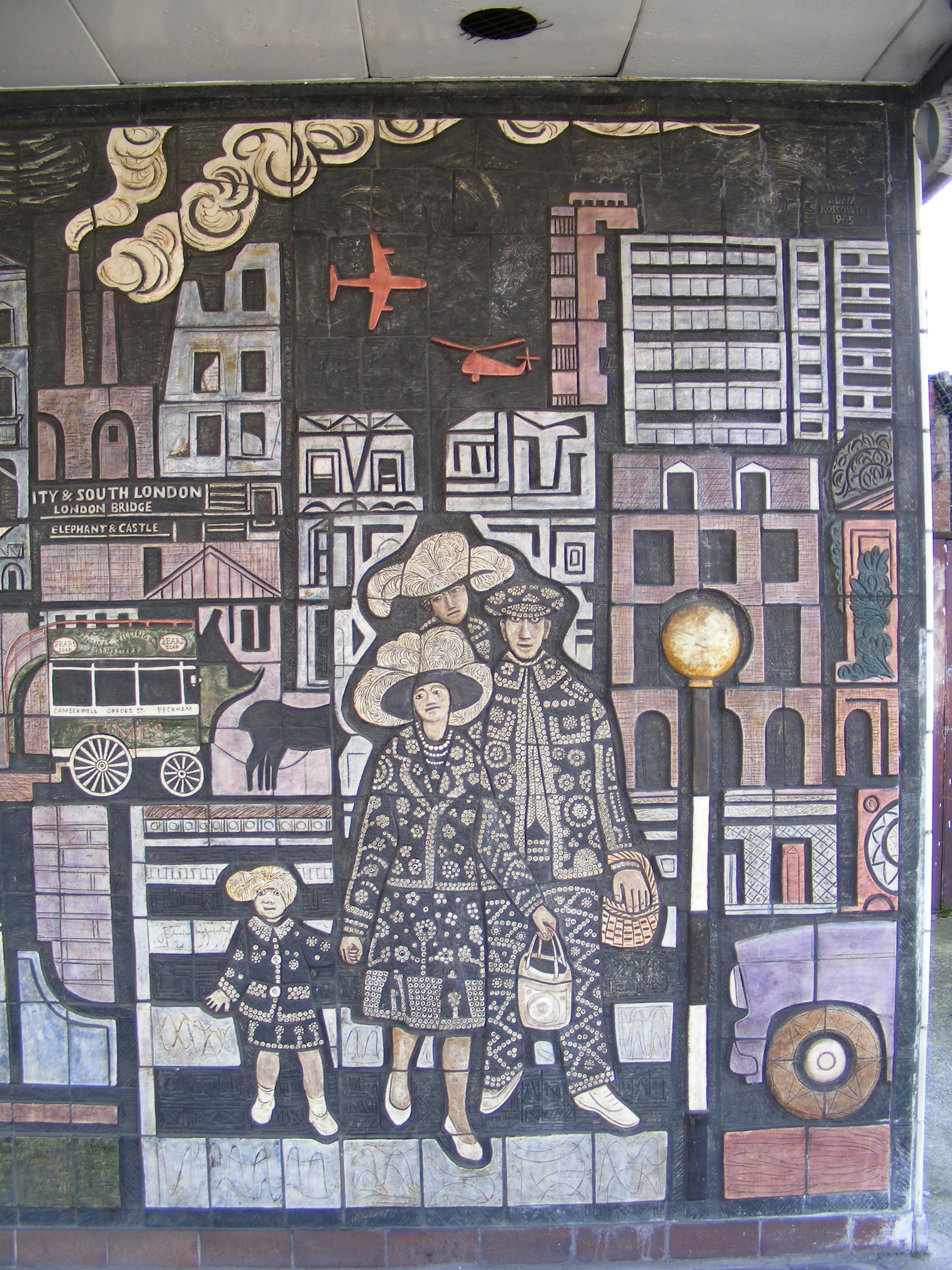
- Artist: Adam Kossowski
- Year: 1964
- Location: Peckham, United Kingdom
- Coordinates: 51°29′00″N 0°03′56″E

History of the Old Kent Road is a mural by the Polish artist Adam Kossowski. It is on the exterior of the former North Peckham Civic Centre in London.
