= Karta medycka =

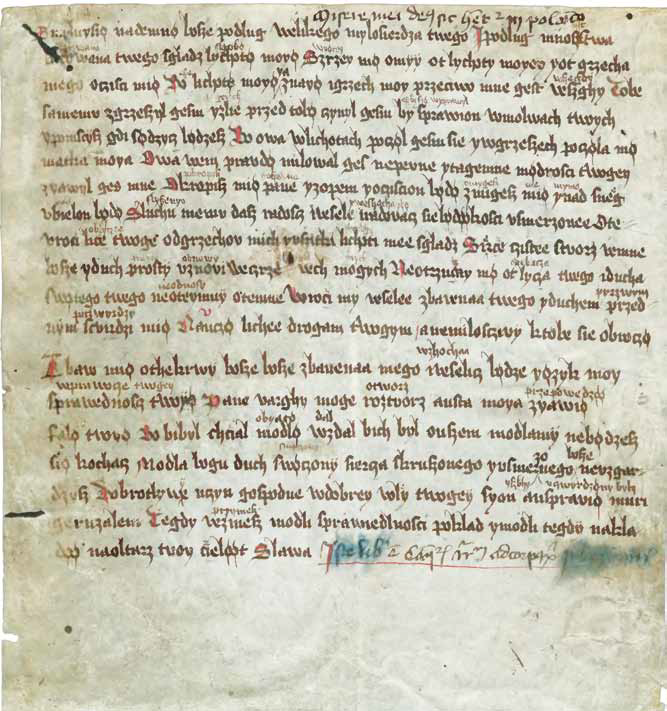
Karta medycka (c. 1405)

Karta medycka (The Page of Medyka, also called the Page of Swidzinski) is a single page from the early 15th century, which contains Polish version of Psalm 50, similar to the one included in St. Florian's Psalter. In lower right corner of the page there is a note stating that it was written by a monk from a monastery in Kazimierz, a district of Kraków, most likely after 1405.

The page was found in 1832 by scholar Konstanty Swidzinski. At first it was kept at the Pawlikowski Library in Medyka, then at the Ossolineum in Lwow. Currently, it is kept at the Ossolineum in Wrocław.

== Sources ==
- Teresa Michalowska: sredniowiecze. Warszawa: Wydawnictwo Naukowe PWN, 1995, s. 300, seria: Wielka Historia Literatury Polskiej. ISBN 83-01-11452-5.
- Przeklady Pisma sw. na j. polski - Rekopisy. Wiara.pl.
