= Józef Wittlin =

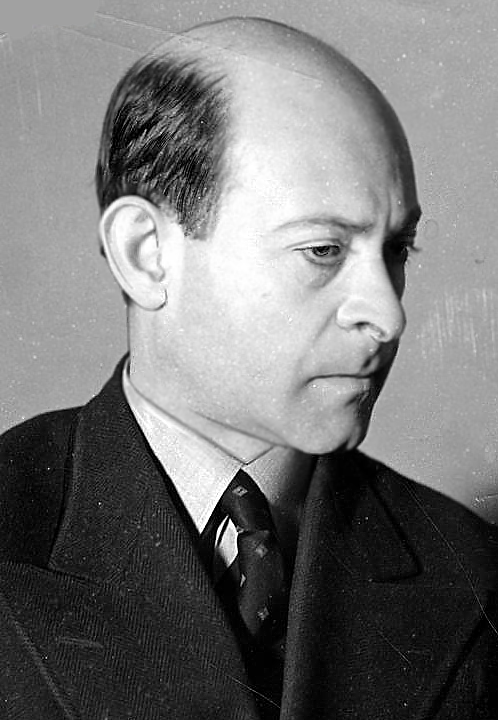
- Born: 17 August 1896; Dmytrów near Radekhiv, Podolia, Galicia, Austria-Hungary
- Died: 28 February 1976 (aged 79); New York City, United States
- Occupations: Author, poet, translator
- Years active: 1920–1963
- Known for: his expressionist and realist poetry
- Notable work: Salt of the Earth (Sól ziemi, 1935)

Józef Wittlin (1896–1976) was a Polish novelist, and, later, American, poet and translator.

== Life ==
After graduating from a classical gimnazjum in Lwów, Wittlin joined the volunteer military formation of the Polish Legion in August 1914. His unit was however soon disbanded due to the refusal of the Poles to take the oath for the Austrian government. Subsequently, he went to Vienna, where he passed the Matura and began studying philosophy. With his friend Joseph Roth he again joined the Austrian army in 1916, and after some military training was drafted into the infantry. Shortly before being sent to the Italian front he fell ill with scarlet fever and was thus prevented from direct participation in the fighting. His military service took place far away from the front and included among other things working as a translator in prisoner-of-war camps with Italian soldiers.

In 1922 he moved to Łódź and 1927 to Warsaw. In 1924 he married Halina Handelsmann. At this time he undertook extensive travels through Europe which significantly influenced his work. At the outbreak of World War II, he was living in Paris, from where he was evacuated in May 1940 to Biarritz. With the help of Hermann Kesten, he and his family succeeded in escaping in January 1941 from Nice through Spain and Portugal to New York, where he remained after the war.

== Works ==
- Anthems (Hymny), Poems (1920)
- War, peace and the soul of a poet (Wojna, pokój i dusza poety), essays (1925)
- From the memoirs of a former pacifist (Ze wspomnień byłego pacyfisty) (1929)
- Stages (Etapy), travel notes (1933)
- Salt of the Earth (Sól ziemi), the first novel of an envisioned, unfinished trilogy Tale of a Patient Infantryman (1935)
- My Lwów (Mój Lwów), memories (1946); English translation (by Antonia Lloyd-Jones) published together with Philippe Sands' My Lviv as City of Lions (London: Pushkin Press, 2016; ISBN 978-1-782271-17-8)
- Orpheus in the underworld of the twentieth century (Orfeusz w piekle XX wieku), essays (1963)
- Poems (Poezje) (1978, posthumously)
