= Stefania Kossowska =

Polish woman editor

- Born: Stefania Szurlej; September 23, 1909; Lemburg, Kingdom of Galicia and Lodomeria, Austria-Hungary
- Died: September 15, 2003 (aged 93); London, England
- Parents: Stanisław Szurlej (father); Jadwiga Ciepielowska (mother)

Stefania Kossowska, née Szurlej (23 September 1909 – 15 September 2003) was a Polish literary editor, political activist, writer and broadcaster.

== Early life ==
Her father was a noted lawyer, Stanisław Szurlej, and her mother, Jadwiga Ciepielowska, was of Polish Jewish descent. The family moved from her native Lwów in Galicia, (now Lviv in Ukraine) to Warsaw in 1920. There, she attended secondary school and began studies for a law degree at the University of Warsaw. She began her writing career while a student contributing to a women's review, "Bluszcz”. Later her journalism encompassed titles such as, the Warsaw evening paper, Wieczór Warszawski, ABC and Prosto z mostu.

== Career ==
Before the war she made a brief excursion to Italy, as a press correspondent and there in Sicily, she met Polish artist, Adam Kossowski. They married in the autumn of 1938. Following the 1939 invasion of Poland, she slipped out of the country, with her parents, through the so-called "green border" into Romania and on to France, to await her husband who was detained in Poland. With France soon occupied by German forces, she moved to the United Kingdom, as an official of the Polish government-in-exile. From 1940 onwards she became a contributor to London and Paris-based publications, among them, Wiadomości Polskie, Polityczne i Literackie, ”Biuletyn Światpolu”, The Polish Daily, "Polska Walcząca”, writing regular commentary and sketches. She also worked for the Polish section, BBC Radio. She was separated from her husband by the war and did not see him for four years. He had fled eastwards in Poland, was arrested by Soviet troops and survived the gulag. He did not reach the West until 1943, with Anders' Army, and was subsequently reunited with his wife in London.

Between 1953 and 1981 Kossowska was increasingly involved with the editing of the weekly, Wiadomości, and contributing the "News from London" column, under the pseudonym, Big Ben. In 1973 she became the paper's editor-in-chief. Between 1954 and 1993 she contributed to Radio Free Europe. She was a signatory of the petition of protest against constitutional changes in Poland, known as the Letter of 59. From 1956 to 1992 she was a member of the Union of Polish Writers Abroad (Związek Pisarzy Polskich na Obczyźnie). In the 1980s she was a cultural adviser to the Polish Cultural Foundation (1950), Polska Fundacja Kulturalna in London. In 1994 she donated the Wiadomści archives to the Library of the University of Torun. She was the custodian of her late husband's artistic legacy and editor and author of several books.

== Personal life ==
She was widowed in 1986. Her own death followed in 2003. She was buried next to her husband, Adam, in the grounds of Aylesford Priory, Kent.

== Awards ==
- Officer's Cross of the Order of Polonia Restituta (1980)
- Alfred Jurzykowski Foundation Prize (1980)
- Zygmunt Hertz Literary Prize under the auspices of Paris-based Kultura (1992)
- Commander's Cross with Star of the Order of Polonia Restituta ( November 1994)

== Selected writings ==
- Mieszkam w Londynie - (I live in London) (1964)
- „Wiadomości” na emigracji - (News from Exile) (1968)
- Jak cię widzę tak cię piszę - ( As I see you, so I write you) (1973)
- Adam Kossowski: Murals and Paintings with contributions by Benedict Read, Tadeusz Chrzanowski, Martin Sankey, Adam Kossowski, Tymon Terlecki, and Andrew Borkowski. London: Armelle Press, 1990. editor,
- Galeria przodków. Sylwetki emigracyjne - (Gallery of Ancestors, Sketches of Exiles) (1991)
- Od Herberta do Herberta. O nagrodzie „Wiadomości” 1958-1990 - (From Herbert to Herbert. About the „Wiadomości” Prize 1958-1990) (1993)
- "Interview with Dr. Andrzej Ciechanowiecki" in Kultura (1993)
- Przyjaciele i znajomi - (Friends and Acquaintances) (1998).
- Definicja szczęścia. Listy do Anny Frajlich 1972-2003 - (A definition of Happiness: Letters to Anna Frajlich)
