= Balthasar Behem Codex =

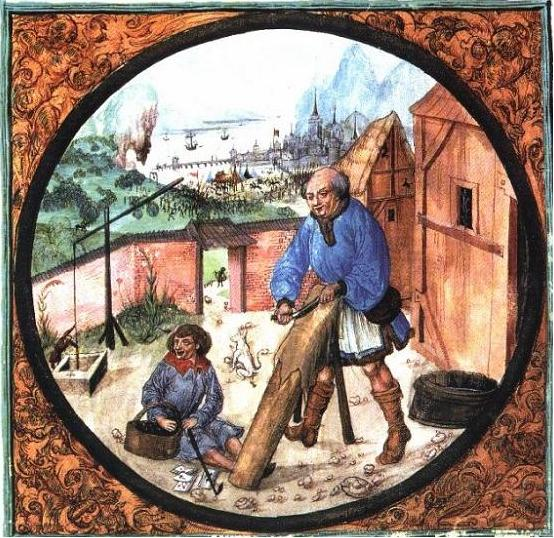
Tanner ("Garbarze - Gerber") - miniature from Balthasar Behem Codex, also here

The Balthasar Behem Codex, also known as Codex Picturatus, is a collection of the charters, privileges and statutes of the burghers of the city of Kraków. Compiled in 1505, the codex was named for the chancellor at the time, Balthasar Behem. The book's text is in German, Latin and Polish. It is now held at the library of the Jagiellonian University of Kraków.

The bylaws of the guilds are featured in twenty-seven illustrations in the codex and depict both biblical subjects and the daily activities of the Kraków burgher guild members, for example that of bakers, titled in Latin: Pistores, with a subtitle in German: Das ist der briff und geseccze der becker von Krakow. ("This is the letter and law of the bakers in Cracow", example in color), and the text calligraphed in Latin.

This kind of illustration - showing the practice of trades - was a tradition with an iconographical history going back to late Roman astronomical texts showing the "Labours of the Months", pairing a characteristic activity of rural life with the astrological sign for that month. Historians of culture and art have shown that these illustrations sometimes reflect their iconographical traditions rather than actually depicting contemporary life with accuracy.
