= Stanisław Baliński =

Polish poet, writer and diplomat

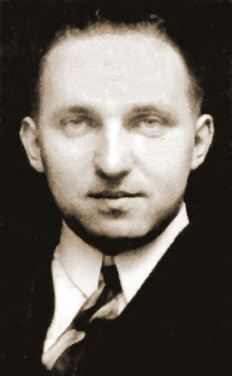
- Born: 2 August 1898; Warsaw, Poland
- Died: 12 November 1984; London, Great Britain
- Occupation: Poet

Stanisław Baliński (2 August 1898 – 12 November 1984) was a Polish poet, writer and diplomat.

== Biography ==
Son of Ignacy h. Jastrzębiec (1862-1951) and Maria née Chomętowska h. Lis (1868-1934), brother of Antoni Edward (1907-1990), diplomatic employee. He majored in Polish studies at Warsaw University and in music theory and composition at the Higher School of Music in Warsaw, and also studied law. In 1920 he became a member of the Skamander poetic group. As of December 1, 1922, he began working at the Ministry of Foreign Affairs. He spent five years on assignment in China, then in Brazil and Iran. He traveled extensively in Europe, South America, the Far and Middle East, North Africa.

After the aggression of the Third Reich and the USSR against Poland (1939), he went to Paris via Romania, then to Great Britain. In 1939-1940 he was an employee of the Ministry of Information and Documentation of the Polish Government in Exile. From 1940 to 1945 he was an employee of the Polish Foreign Ministry in London. After Adam Tarnowski became Foreign Minister from November 30, 1944 to January 1945, he was chargé d'affaires to the exile government of Czechoslovakia. After the war, Baliński - a declared opponent of Yalta and the communist government - decided to stay in London. In the 1950s he worked with the radio stations Free Europe and Voice of America. From 1945 he was a member of the English PEN Club.

In the interwar years, he published in the magazines "Skamander" and "Literary News," among others. During World War II, he wrote in the magazines "Wiadomości Polskie" (1940-1944), "Nowa Polska" (1942-1944), "Dziennik Polski i Dziennik Żołnierza" (1944). After the war, among others, in "Wiadomosci". He signed a letter of Polish writers abroad, solidifying with the signatories of the protest against the changes in the Constitution of the People's Republic of Poland (Letter 59). Winner of the Award of the Association of Polish Writers Abroad in 1981.

His symbolic grave is located in the Powązki Cemetery in Warsaw (section T-2-2). His song "Mój Kapitanie, już wieczór" was popularized by Sława Przybylska, performing it to the music of Włodzimierz Korcz.
