= Stanisław Stroński =

Polish politician (1882–1955)

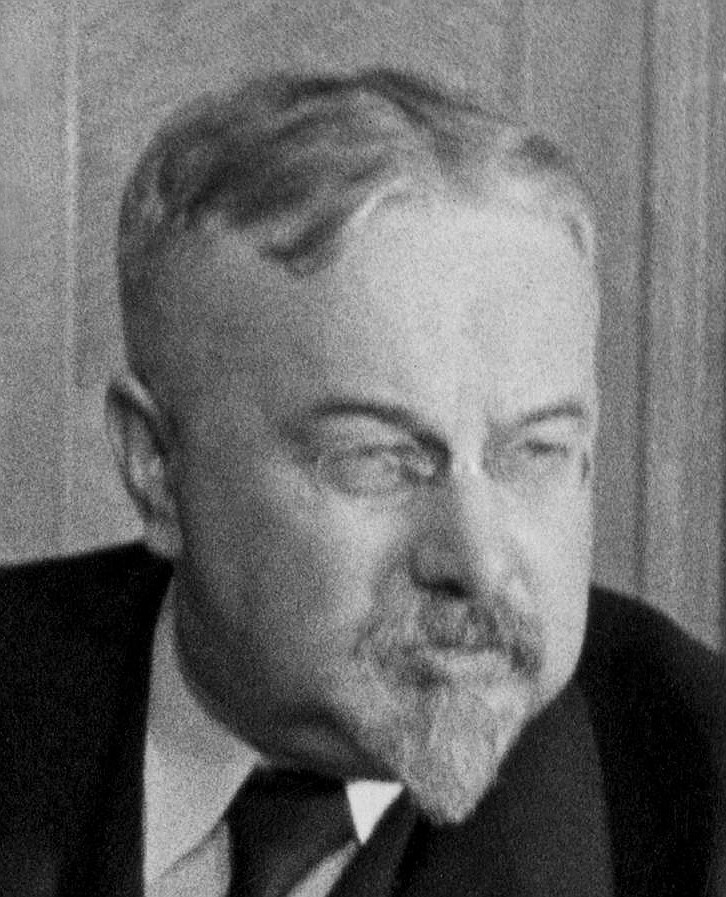
Stanisław Stroński

Stanisław Stroński (18 August 1882 – 2 October 1955) was a Polish philologist, publicist and politician (a National Democracy Sejm deputy). In interwar Poland he edited the Rzeczpospolita newspaper and was a professor at Kraków's Jagiellonian University and at the Catholic University of Lublin. During World War II he was a member of the Polish government in exile, serving as information minister. At war's end, he remained abroad.

An outspoken antisemite, Stroński had recent and well documented Jewish roots (his mother Emilia Loevy was a daughter of a Jewish physician from Nisko). Jewish members of the Sejm frequently mentioned his Jewish ancestry when attacking him in speeches.

He was a vocal prewar opponent of Poland's first president, Gabriel Narutowicz, and of Marshal Józef Piłsudski. Following Narutowicz's election, Stroński wrote that he "puts himself forward as a representative of the Polish state thanks to the Jewish-German-Ukrainian vote". Following Narutowicz's murder, Stroński who had just a few days earlier called him a "their [the Jews] President", wrote that the murdered president belonged to the "whole nation".

It was Stroński who coined the expression, "Miracle at the Vistula," intended to derogate Piłsudski's 1920 victory over the Soviets. Ironically, the expression quickly lost its intended meaning and was adopted with approval by some patriotically- or piously-minded Poles unaware of Stroński's ironic intent.

His academic interests centered on the medieval Occitan literature, especially about the Troubadours. In this field he is reputed as one of the most important scholars of the 20th century.
