= Adam Kossowski =

Polish artist (1905–1986)

- Self-portrait, 1977
- Born: 5 December 1905; Nowy Sącz, Poland
- Died: 31 March 1986 (aged 80); London, England, UK
- Education: Warsaw Technical University (architecture), Cracow Academy of Fine Arts (painting), Warsaw Academy of Fine Arts (painting)
- Known for: Painting, murals, ceramics, sacred art
- Notable work: Aylesford Priory, Aylesford; History of the Old Kent Road; The Apocalypse of St. John, St. Benet's Chaplaincy, Queen Mary, University of London
- Patrons: Rev. Malachy Lynch, O.Carm.

Adam Kossowski (5 December 1905 – 31 March 1986) was a Polish artist, born in Nowy Sącz, notable for his works for the Catholic Church in England, where he arrived in 1943 as a refugee from Soviet labour camps and was invited in 1944 to join the Guild of Catholic Artists and Craftsmen.

== Life in Poland ==
In 1923, uncertain about a career as a painter, Kossowski began architecture studies at Warsaw Technical University. But after two years there, he turned to painting and was accepted into the Cracow Academy of Fine Arts. During his time in Cracow he worked on the restoration of paintings at Wawel Castle. In 1929 he returned to Warsaw and its Academy of Fine Arts. Travelling on a government grant, Kossowski experienced Italian art in Rome (where he studied tempera painting techniques), Florence, Naples and Sicily.

On 29 October 1938, Kossowski married Stefania Szurlej, whom he had met in Rome. He was named "senior assistant" at the Warsaw Academy of Art and won first prize in a competition to create interior sgraffito work at Warsaw's Central Railway Station. But this project was abandoned after Germany invaded Poland in September 1939. Kossowski's wife fled with her parents; and Kossowski himself went east, where he was arrested by invading Russian troops in November 1939.

== In the Gulag and beyond ==
Kossowski was first imprisoned at Skole and then at Kharkov, both in present Ukraine. He told Fr. Martin Sankey, "In prison I stayed about a year. Later we received sentences. I got five years of hard labour camp and was sent to the part of the Gulag which is called Peczlag, on the river Peczora which runs into the Polar Sea and I stayed there till 1942."

At this time Kossowski began to pray, " … because when I was so deep in this calamity and nearly dead I promised myself that if I came out of this subhuman land I would tender my thanks to God. I hesitate to call it a vow, it was rather a promise to myself but later I used to think that it was my obligation …"

He went on to describe his release with other Polish prisoners to form the Polish 2nd Corps under General Władysław Anders:

From the camp on the river Amu-Daria - where I was sent from the North - I was evacuated finally with other Poles to the banks of the Caspian Sea from where we went to Pahlevi on the Persian coast. There the Polish ex-prisoners gradually received English uniforms, our old rags infected with all sorts of disease and insects being burned, and we started the journey towards Teheran and from there to Palestine.

After several months of recuperation in Palestine, Kossowski, through the efforts of his wife in London, travelled on the liner RMS Scythia to Scotland. In 1943 he joined the Polish Ministry of Information in London, where he worked throughout the war.

== Life and work in England ==
Working from a studio in Hampstead (6 Frognal Gardens), Kossowski composed work for his first show in London, entitled "A Polish Soldier's Journey", which opened on 7 June 1944 and consisted of new drawings and some he had made during his difficult sojourn in Ukraine and on through to Palestine. In a brief note on the show, The Burlington Magazine for Connoisseurs observed,

The drawings produced in the course of the three years of the artist's life thus absorbed, are notable for showing, apart from a real power of interpreting the local character of each scene, a rare sense of the dramatic, the gift of effective silhouetting being particularly characteristic. We see here well exemplified the profit which the artist (who long taught mural painting at Warsaw Academy) derived from his protracted studies of the frescoes in Rome and Assisi. Figure-drawing, of a very incisive kind, inevitably comes much to the fore in scenes which succeed each other on the walls of the exhibition, but many of the impressions of landscape, here displayed, will also remain impressed upon the spectator's memory. Altogether, this is an art very much in the best Polish tradition, and with an individual note definitely its own.

After winning a prize for the oil painting Jesus Bearing the Cross (also known as Veronica) in 1944, Kossowski was invited to join the Guild of Catholic Artists by its chairman, sculptor Philip Lindsey Clark.

=== Aylesford commissions ===
This connection, in turn, led to Kossowski's first major commission in 1950 from Fr. Malachy Lynch, prior of The Friars at Aylesford, Kent: the seven-panel History of the Carmelites of Aylesford in tempera.

Kossowski's first large ceramic project, a Rosary Way, also came as an Aylesford commission. When the artist suggested that he may not be "the man who should do that", Fr. Malachy replied, "Adam, I am sure Our Lady has sent you here for that purpose." Kossowski later commented on this project:

Looking at these Mysteries now, and remembering the agonies, the frenzies and delights of this spontaneous work, I think my inexperience and technical near-impudence contributed much to the freshness and simplicity of these works which, I hope, redeem some of the shortcomings.

When the Rosary Way was successfully completed, Kossowski received "the biggest ceramic commission that I ever had till then", The Vision of St. Simon Stock. Kossowski recalled:

At that time I had already had some experience with the famous old Fulham Pottery which was still operating. They were quite ready to fire for me the larger pieces of ceramics in their old-fashioned kiln, one not used anymore elsewhere, heated by coal and coke. They could get only one temperature and one kind of glaze. You could not make any changes and I realized that every piece could be fired only once. So I had to put the colours and the glazes and the body in one firing only. It was a miracle that it came out quite alright, with very few small cracks. And the temperature had to be very high - at least 1200 degrees.

Casts from the original Vision of St. Simon Stock were also sent to three Carmelite ministries in the United States: The Carmelite Spiritual Center, Darien, Illinois in 1959 (interior installation); Mount Carmel High School, Houston, Texas in 1960 (now Cristo Rey Jesuit College Preparatory of Houston, exterior installation); and Joliet Catholic High School, Joliet, Illinois in 1962 (now Victory Centre of Joliet, interior installation).

Kossowski also worked on a number of ceramics for the National Shrine of Saint Jude in Faversham, Kent, which was run by Fr. Malachy's brother: Fr. Elias.

Kossowski's creative relationship with the Aylesford Carmelites lasted from 1950 to 1972, where he created about one hundred distinct pieces of art "in ceramic, tempera and oil painting, mosaic, wrought iron, and stained glass." From 1953 to 1970 he worked in London on large reliefs and murals at his studio on Old Brompton Road. In 1970 he closed that studio and worked at his home studio, 49 Chesilton Road. Also in 1970, he received a Jurzykowski Foundation award for visual art.

=== Other commission and reviews ===
After an exhibition in 1952, a brief notice in The Tablet commented,

Mr. Adam Kossowski comes from Southern Poland, where East and West meet. He studied mural painting in Italy, taught in Warsaw and suffered for two and a half years in Russian prisons and labour camps. This rich experience of nationality, training and suffering is obvious in all his work. He is thoroughly mature artist of great vitality and exuberance but with the necessary discipline to harness these forces.

From 1953 to 1970, Kossowski completed many commissions for large murals and reliefs. Among these were the sgraffito work of The Apocalypse of St. John (1964) in St. Benet's Chaplaincy, Queen Mary College, University of London and, "probably his largest composition", the 2000-tile ceramic History of the Old Kent Road (1964) at the former North Peckham Civic Centre in London. Of The Apocalypse of St. John, Terlecki has written,

Kossowski often worked on it until late in the night or the early hours of morning. He would remain alone with his vision. This was also dictated by the medium because of [sic] the top layer of the sgraffito dries quickly. But the creator's sharpness of sight and precision of hand caused him to vanquish technical difficulties.

More work by Kossowski can be seen in the video "Adam Kossowski (1905-1986): Art and Promise" (see YouTube) which reports on an exhibition held at the Museum of the Archdiocese of Warsaw from 9 October 2025 to 1 March 2026.

== Death ==
Kossowski died in London on 31 March 1986, aged 80, and is buried at Aylesford, Kent. In 2003 he was joined there by his wife, Stefania.

== Notable works ==
- Tympanum at St Mary's Church, Leyland, Lancashire
- Sgraffito murals at St Benet's Chaplaincy, Queen Mary College, University of London
- Figure of Christ and Stations of the Cross mural at RC Church of Christ the King, Milnthorpe, Cumbria
- Ceramics at the Chapel of St Aloysius RC Church, Camden, London
- History of the Old Kent Road mural at the former North Peckham Civic Centre, Old Kent Road, London
- Extensive ceramics and paintings at The Friars in Aylesford, Kent
- Ceramics at the National shrine of St Jude in Faversham, Kent
- Murals at Monmouth School Chapel, 1985-6.

== Awards ==
- 1938 - Award at the Xth Salon of the Institute of Propagation of Arts, Warsaw
- 1939 - First Prize and commission for the murals of the First Class Passengers' Bar, the new Central Railway Station, Warsaw
- 1944 - Second Prize for Jesus Bearing the Cross (also referred to as Veronica) from international religious art competition sponsored by Mowbray Publishers and Central Institute of Art and Design
- 1970 - The Alfred Jurzykowski Foundation Award (New York) for "outstanding creative achievement in fine arts"
- 1980 - Awarded the Order of Polonia Restituta by the Polish President in Exile

== Bibliography ==
- Adam Kossowski: Murals and Paintings with contributions by Benedict Read, Tadeusz Chrzanowski, Martin Sankey, Adam Kossowski, Tymon Terlecki, and Andrew Borkowski. London: Armelle Press, 1990.
- "Adam Kossowski." The Burlington Magazine for Connoisseurs, Vol. 85, No. 496 (Jul. 1944), p. 182.
- Morris, Rev. N. F. M. (1987). The Murals in Monmouth School Chapel. Monmouth, UK: Boase Press. ISBN 9-780-94812302-3. OCLC 24745623.
