= Lanckoroński Foundation =

Switzerland-based charitable organisation

- Formation: 1967
- Headquarters: Liechtenstein
- President: Piotr Piniński
- Website: https://fundacjalanckoronskich.org/en/

The Lanckoroński Foundation (Polish: Fundacja Lanckorońskich), originally founded in 1967 in Fribourg, Switzerland as the successor of the charitable organisation of the Count Charles Lanckoronski Fund, is today registered in Liechtenstein and supports the humanities in Poland for the period ending in 1939, by way of research scholarships as well as grants to scholars and academic institutions for projects including those in the field of publishing, exhibitions and conferences.
