= Henryka Łazowertówna =

Polish lyric poet (1909–1942)

- Born: 19 June 1909; Warsaw, Poland
- Died: August 1942 (aged 33); Treblinka
- Occupations: Poet and writer
- Writing career
- Pen name: Henryka; H. Łaz.
- Period: Interbellum; Second World War
- Genre: Lyric poetry
- Notable works: Zamknięty pokój (1930); Imiona świata (1934)
- Literary movement: Skamander

Henryka Łazowertówna (pronounced ['xɛnˈrɨka waˌzɔvɛrˈtuvna]; in full Henryka Wanda Łazowertówna); also Henryka Lazowert, or incorrectly Lazawert, (19 June 1909 – August 1942) was a Polish lyric poet. While in general deeply personal in nature and of great emotive intensity, her poetry is not devoid of social concerns and patriotic overtones. She is considered one of the eminent Polish authors of Jewish descent.

To the reading public she is known as the author of the poem "Mały szmugler" (The Little Smuggler), written in the Warsaw Ghetto c.1941 and first published posthumously in 1947. The poem deals with the subject of a child struggling single-handedly to keep his family alive in the Ghetto by smuggling provisions from the "Aryan" side at the risk of his own life. A poem begins with the stanza also known from an adaptive translation provided by Richard C. Lukas. It reads as follows:

Przez mury, przez dziury, przez warty Przez druty, przez gruzy, przez płot Zgłodniały, zuchwały, uparty Przemykam, przebiegam jak kot.	Past rubble, fence, barbed wire Past soldiers guarding the Wall, Starving but still defiant, I softly steal past them all.

The original text of the poem, together with translations in English and in Hebrew, is today inscribed on the Memorial to the Child Victims of the Holocaust (Pomnik Pamięci Dzieci in Warsaw), serving as the epitaph for the million children murdered in the Holocaust.

== Life ==
Henryka Łazowertówna was the daughter of Maksymilian Łazowert and his wife Bluma. Her mother was a schoolteacher. Łazowertówna studied Polish and Romance philology at the University of Warsaw, and subsequently French literature at the University of Grenoble on a scholarship funded by the Polish interwar Government.

She was a very active member of the Warsaw section of the Polish Writers' Union, participating in the events organized by the institution, such as for example the conference commemorating the 10th anniversary of the death of the writer Stefan Żeromski in December 1935, an event during which she read from her works alongside such famous poets as Czesław Miłosz, Juljan Tuwim, and Kazimierz Wierzyński. Among the literary magazines of the day Łazowertówna collaborated principally with the literary journals Droga and Pion. She was seen as being poetically close to the Skamander circle, publishing in her short life of 33 years two collections of poetry, Zamknięty pokój ("A Closed Room"), in which the Closed Room of the title poem is self-avowedly a metaphor for the person of the poet herself, and Imiona świata ("The Names the World is Known By"), whose programmatic poem fulfills the poet's promise of the earlier collection to sound a voice uniquely her own among the women poets of the interbellum period. Zamknięty pokój ("A Closed Room") was – in the words of the writer and a stern literary critic Karol Wiktor Zawodziński (1890–1949) – a manifestation of a particularly subtile poetic talent and an extraordinary intelligence, both struggling to break free of the magic circle of subjectivism and onto the rough and tough ferment of the world (zamęt życia).

Politically speaking, Henryka Łazowertówna was known for her left-wing sympathies, a point on which she differed – in the opinion of Józef Łobodowski – from another famous poet of her generation, Zuzanna Ginczanka. However, her leftism was a condition of her sensitivity to social injustice and her moral rejection of all forms of oppression rather than an outcome of a political ideology. In contradistinction to Lucjan Szenwald, her contemporary, she remained fundamentally a lyric poet to the end.

She lived in Warsaw with her mother in the ulica Sienna.

=== Identity ===
Biographer Eugenia Prokop-Janiec of Jagiellonian University asserts that it is the active antisemitism of the Polish society (Gazeta Warszawska) in the 1930s that ultimately forced the writers and poets like Henryka Łazowertówna who never espoused any particular aspect of specifically Jewish identity while working in the Polish language, to align themselves with the Jewish community for the first time during either the Interbellum or the Second World War. Indeed, the hostility obtaining between the Jewish and non-Jewish communities in Poland receives an eloquent treatment in Łazowertówna's own fictional short story Wrogowie ("The Enemies"), published in 1938 – sixteen months before the outbreak of the Second World War – where she tells the story of two child hawkers of pretzels, the one Jewish the other Gentile, who with great animosity towards each other aggressively compete for custom until common misfortune counsels them to join forces in the cause of common good (see Works in Prose).

Other established Jewish writers enjoyed the utmost prestige in the country, such as Bolesław Leśmian, Julian Tuwim, Antoni Słonimski as well as other Jewish members and celebrated recipients of the Golden Laurel from the Polish Academy of Literature (PAL), thus making Łazowertówna's biography somewhat unusual.

=== In the Warsaw Ghetto ===
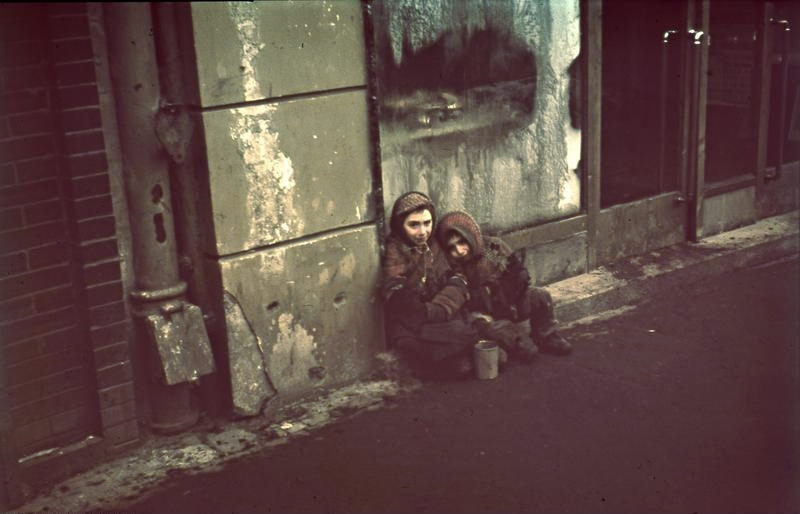
The children reduced to begging in the Warsaw Ghetto

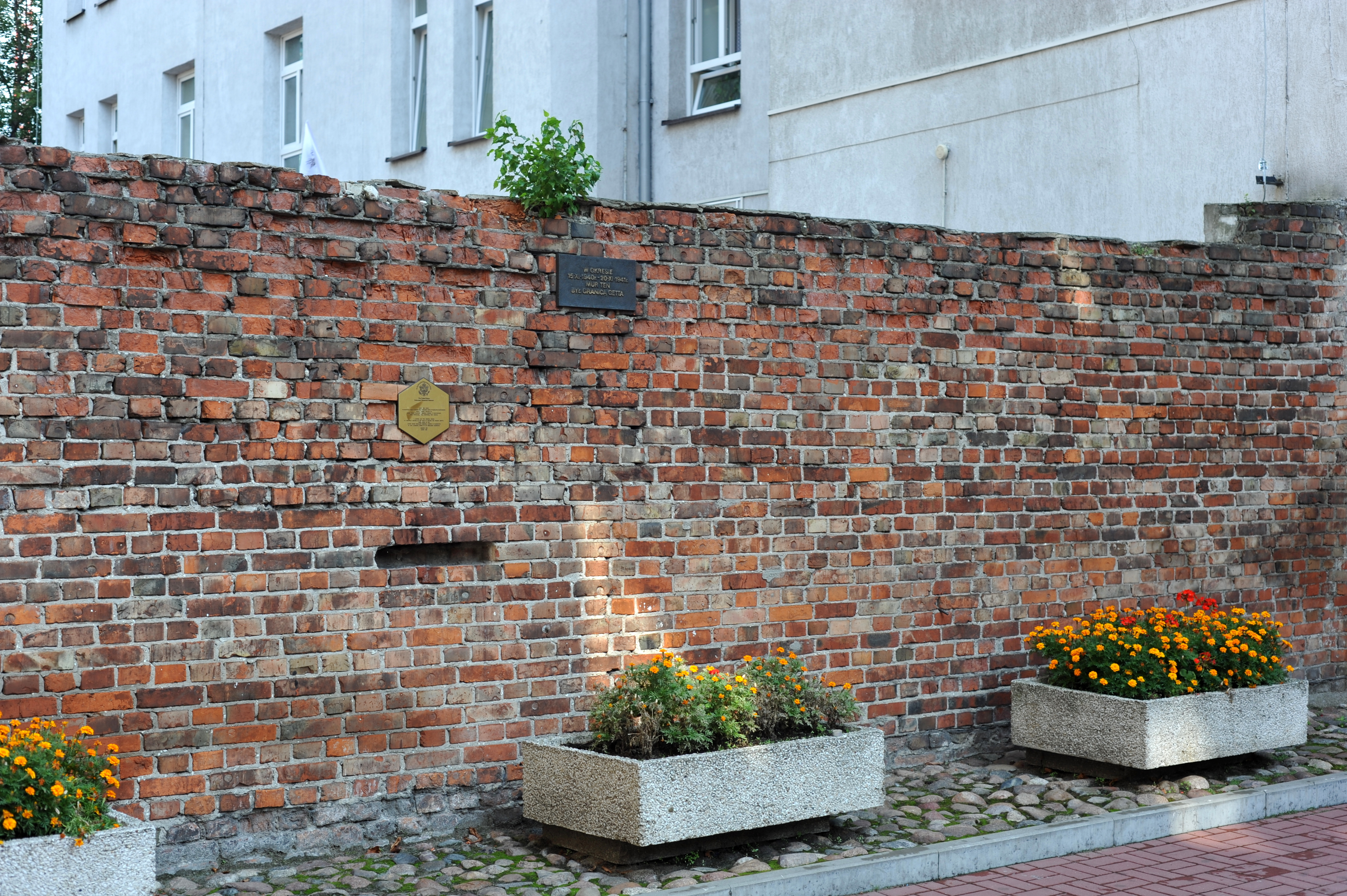
A surviving part of the actual Warsaw Ghetto wall in the ulica Sienna where Łazowertówna lived

During the Nazi Germany's Invasion of Poland in September 1939 part of Łazowertówna's Warsaw apartment in the ulica Sienna, which she shared with her mother, was destroyed in the strategic bombing conducted by the Luftwaffe, but it was found possible to make the remaining quarters habitable again. (Łazowertówna's father had died of natural causes before the War.)

A year after the outbreak of the Second World War Henryka Łazowertówna found herself suddenly interned in the Warsaw Ghetto, like other residents of Jewish origin in the city, though without forced resettlement — the ulica Sienna of her residence having been simply encircled by the borders of the so-called "Little Ghetto" (of the Ghetto's two parts, the North Side and the South Side, this was the South Side). As observed by Władysław Smólski (1909–1986), who visited her often during the first year of the War, the drama unfolding around her proved for Łazowertówna an opportunity to rise to the occasion displaying unhoped-for reserves of determination and strength. She immediately began collaboration with the Jewish charitable organization CENTOS whose mission was the care for orphaned or homeless children. Here she was recruited by Emanuel Ringelblum as a worker at his social-aid organization, the Żydowska Samopomoc Społeczna or Aleynhilf. Her duties were those of a copy-writer for the various ad hoc utilitarian publications of that charitable institution (information leaflets, appeals for donations, etc.).

She was subsequently recruited by Ringelblum to staff the Oyneg Shabbos Archives — also known as the Emanuel Ringelblum Archives in the UNESCO's Memory of the World Programme's Memory of the World Register.

In the Ghetto she continued to write poetry. Apart from the testimony to the realities of Ghetto life memorialized in the famous poem "Mały szmugler" (The Little Smuggler), there also survives (preserved in the Adam Mickiewicz Museum of Literature of Warsaw) the letter of Łazowertówna addressed to the poet Roman Kołoniecki (1906–1978) and dated 6 September 1941, a moving lyrical account of the Ghetto streets and the passersby to be encountered in them.

Łazowertówna had apparently no illusions that she needed outside help in order to survive: already in February or March 1940 (many months before the creation of the Ghetto), she enlisted the services of Ludwik Brandstaetter, the father of the well-known writer Roman Brandstaetter, in approaching a mutual Polish poet-friend with a request for assistance with resettlement in Krakóww, a city which she believed would offer her anonymity and hence greater security. One last (bitter) comment on the ultimate fate of Łazowertówna is offered by Emanuel Ringelblum himself:

Łazowertówna was ill with a lung condition; however without a substantial amount of money in cash, without some ten thousand zlotys or so, one could not dream of [crossing over to] the Aryan side... she had lots of Polish friends, after all they honoured her with many an authorial evening reception, she was a member of the Polish Writers' Union — despite all this there wasn't anyone in the end to save her...

However, Władysław Smólski reports that when it became clear in the course of 1941 that the Ghetto would be eventually closed off from the outside world, many of Łazowertówna's friends counselled her to leave the precinct (together with her mother) while this was still possible, offering to find a safe house for the two of them. She apparently refused to do so, arguing that she was needed by the most unfortunate of beings, the children, orphaned or homeless, for whom she cared at the time.

Between July and September 1942, the Nazis undertook the so-called Großaktion Warschau, the mass deportation of the Warsaw Ghetto population, who were murdered in the gas chambers at Treblinka extermination camp, some 84 kilometres (52 mi) to the north-east. Of her own free will, Henryka Łazowertówna accompanied her mother to the Umschlagplatz, or the railway loading-dock, that served as a point of departure for the victims. The organization that employed her, the Aleynhilf, attempted to rescue Łazowertówna from being included in the transport, but when she learned that she would have to leave her mother behind, Łazowertówna declined the assistance being offered to her alone.

== Works ==
=== Poetry collections ===
- Zamknięty pokój (1930)
- Imiona świata (1934)

=== Individual poems ===
- "O zachodzie słońca" ("At the Setting of the Sun"; Pamiętnik Warszawski (Warsaw), vol. 3, Nos. 7–9, July–September 1931, page 88)
- "Noc na ulicy Śliskiej" ("A Night in Śliska Street"; Droga: miesięcznik poświęcony sprawie życia polskiego (Warsaw), vol. 14, No. 4, 1935, page 365)
- "Mały szmugler" ("The Little Smuggler", c.1941; first publication in: Pieśń ujdzie cało...: antologia wierszy o Żydach pod okupacją niemiecką, comp., ed., & introd. M M. Borwicz, Warsaw, [n.p.], 1947, pages 115–116) (See on Google Books.) (For an English translation, see e.g., Patricia Heberer, Children during the Holocaust, Lanham (Maryland), AltaMira Press (in association with the United States Holocaust Memorial Museum), 2011, p. 343. ISBN 9780759119840, ISBN 0759119848.)

=== Prose ===
- "Anna de Noailles" (On Anna de Noailles; Droga: miesięcznik poświęcony sprawie życia polskiego (Warsaw), vol. 13, No. 4, 1934, pages 399–401)
- Wrogowie: opowiadanie ("The Enemies: A Short Story"; Nowy Głos (a daily Jewish newspaper of Warsaw), vol. 2, No. 120, 30 April 1938, page 6. An allegory, not without hope, on the hostile race relations between the Jewish and non-Jewish communities of Poland.)

== See also ==
- The Little Smuggler
- Julian Tuwim
- Skamander
- Emanuel Ringelblum
- Ringelblum Archive
- Zuzanna Ginczanka

== Sources ==
- Zamknięty pokój ("A Closed Room"; 1930) on Google Books
- Imiona świata ("The Names the World is Known By"; 1934) on Google Books

== Bibliography ==
- Encyklopedia PWN, s.v. "Łazowertówna, Henryka" online (See also Internetowa encyklopedia PWN.)
- Poezja polska, 1914–1939: antologia, comp. & ed. R. Matuszewski & S. Pollak, Warsaw, Czytelnik, 1962. An anthology of Polish poetry criticized in the Polish press specifically for its inclusion of only two poems by a poet "as important as Łazowertówna": see T. S., "Antologia poezji" (An Anthology of Poetry?), Stolica (Warsaw), vol. 18, No. 6 (792), 10 February 1963, p. 19.
- Edward Kozikowski, "Henryka Łazowertówna"; in id., Więcej prawdy niż plotki: wspomnienia o pisarzach czasów minionych, Warsaw, Państwowy Instytut Wydawniczy, 1964, pages 420ff.
- Władysław Smólski, "Tragiczny los poetki" (The Tragic Fate of a Poetess), Stolica (Warsaw), vol. 20, No. 14 (904), 4 April 1965, p. 16. (Recollections of a personal acquaintance of Łazowertówna; the article includes a rare photograph of her.)
- Karol Wiktor Zawodziński, "'Zamknięty pokój' Henryki Łazowertówny" (A Closed Room of Henryka Łazowertówna), Pamiętnik Warszawski (Warsaw), vol. 3, No. 3, March 1931, pages 90–93; reprinted in id., Wśród poetów, KRAKÓWw, Wydawnictwo Literackie, 1964, pages 312–315; see also pages 117, 329–330.
- Piotr Matywiecki, Kamień graniczny, Warsaw, Latona, 1994, pp. 196–276. ISBN 8385449205.
- Encyclopedia of the Holocaust, ed. I. Gutman, vol. 4, New York City, Macmillan Publishing Company, 1995, p. 884, col. 1. ISBN 0028960904.
- Tadeusz K. Gierymski, "O tym nie można ani mówić, ani milczeć" (A Subject Unfit to be Talked About or to be Passed Over in Silence), Spojrzenia (ezine), No. 123, 28 April 1995. ISSN 1067-4020. (See online.)
- Ionas Turkov, C'était ainsi: 1939–1945, la vie dans le ghetto de Varsovie, tr. from the Yiddish to French M. Pfeffer, Paris, Austral, 1995. ISBN 2841120309.
- Regina Grol, "Henryka Łazowertówna: poetka i świadek życia getta warszawskiego", Midrasz (Warsaw), No. 4 (108), 2006, pages 22–25. ISSN 1428-121X.
- Samuel D. Kassow, "The Polish Language Writers: Henryka Lazowert [sic] and Gustawa Jarecka"; in id., Who will Write Our History?: Emanuel Ringelblum, the Warsaw Ghetto, and the Oyneg Shabes Archive, Bloomington (Indiana), Indiana University Press, 2007, pages 181ff. ISBN 9780253349088, ISBN 0253349087.
- Barbara Engelking & Jacek Leociak, The Warsaw Ghetto: A Guide to the Perished City, tr. E. Harris, New Haven (Connecticut), Yale University Press, 2009, passim. ISBN 9780300112344, ISBN 0300112343. (Includes English translation in blank verse of the poem "Mały szmugler"—"The Little Smuggler", pp. 448–449.)
- Patricia Heberer, Children during the Holocaust, introd. Nechama Tec, advisory committee Christopher R. Browning, et al., Lanham (Maryland), AltaMira Press (in association with the United States Holocaust Memorial Museum), 2011, pages 342ff. ISBN 9780759119840, ISBN 0759119848. (Includes literal English translation in blank verse of the poem "Mały szmugler"—"The Little Smuggler", p. 343.)
