= Zuzanna Ginczanka =

Polish-Jewish poet (1917–1945)

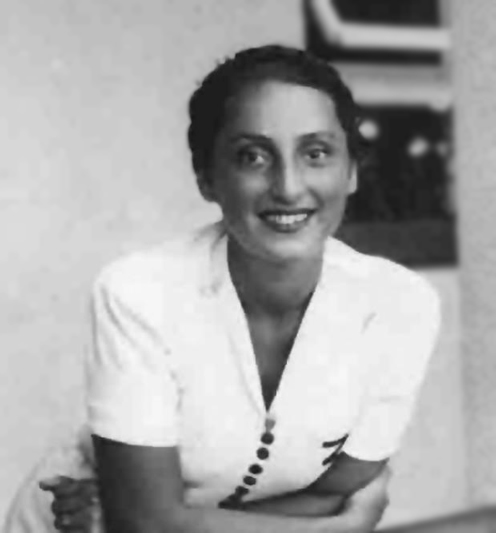
- Born: Zuzanna Polina Gincburg; March 22, 1917; Kiev, Kiev Governorate, Russian Empire
- Died: 1944 (aged 26); Kraków, General Government, German-occupied Poland
- Occupations: Poet, writer, translator, author of radio dramas
- Spouse: Michał Weinzieher (from 1940)
- Relatives: Simon Ginzburg (Pol., Szymon Gincburg; father); Tsetsiliya Ginzburg (Pol., Cecylia Gincburg; secundo voto Roth; mother); Klara Sandberg (maternal grandmother)
- Writing career
- Pen name: Zuzanna Gincburżanka; Zuzanna Polonia Gincburg; Sana Ginzburg; Sana Ginsburg; Sana Weinzieher
- Period: Interbellum (1928–1939); Second World War
- Genres: Lyric poetry (katastrofizm); Satirical poetry
- Subjects: Sensuous joie de vivre, biologism
- Notable works: O centaurach (1936); Poem "Non omnis moriar" (1942)
- Notable awards: Honourable mention, Young Poets' Competition (Turniej Młodych Poetów) of the Wiadomości Literackie, 1934
- Movements: Grupa poetycka Wołyń (Równe); Skamander

Zuzanna Polina Gincburg (March 22, 1917–1944), known by her pen name Zuzanna Ginczanka, was a Polish-Jewish poet of the interwar period. Although she only published a single collection of poetry in her lifetime, her book O centaurach (About Centaurs, 1936) created a sensation in Poland's literary circles. She was arrested and executed in Kraków shortly before the end of World War II. (Note: The exact date of birth of Zuzanna Ginczanka (Sara Ginzburg) is a subject of an ongoing debate due to conflicting documentary evidence. It is being quoted also as March 9 by Tomaszewski & Żbikowski, or March 15 by Kiec, and March 20 by Bartelski, as well as March 22, 1917, proposed most recently by Belchenko. The exact date of her prison death is not known.)

== Life ==
Zuzanna Ginczanka was born Zuzanna Polina Ginzburg ("Gincburg" in Polish phonetic respelling) on 22 March, 1917 in Kiev, then part of the Russian Empire. Her Jewish parents fled the Russian Civil War, settling in 1922 in the predominantly Yiddish-speaking town of Równe, also called Równe Wołyńskie by the inhabitants, in the Kresy Wschodnie (Eastern Borderlands) of pre-War Poland (now in Western Ukraine).

Her father, Simon Ginzburg, was a lawyer by profession; her mother Tsetsiliya (Цецилия) Ginzburg, née Sandberg, a housewife. She was abandoned by both parents, first by her father, who after a divorce left for Berlin, and later by her mother, who left for Spain after a remarriage. The young girl then moved to Równe to live (modern-day Rivne, Ukraine) with her maternal grandmother, Klara Sandberg, by all accounts a wise and prudent woman, who was responsible for her upbringing. Sandberg's house on the town's main street, with its ground-floor store, a pharmacy, was described as moderately affluent by the writer Jerzy Andrzejewski, Ginczanka's contemporary, who sought her acquaintance, and independently by the poet Jan Śpiewak, a fellow resident in the town. She became known as "Sana" by her closest friends.

Between 1927 and 1935, she attended a state high school in Równe, the Państwowe Gimnazjum im. T. Kościuszki. In 1935 she moved to Warsaw to begin studies at Warsaw University, but her studies there soon ended, likely due to antisemitic incidents at the university.

Ginczanka held a Nansen passport. Despite efforts made to obtain Polish citizenship before the outbreak of the war, she was unsuccessful.

=== Early period ===
Ginczanka spoke both Russian, the choice of her emancipated parents, and the Polish of her friends. Despite living in a Yiddish-speaking town, she did not know that language. Her longing to become a Polish poet caused her to choose the Polish language. According to Ginczanka's mother, she began composing verses at the age of four, authoring a whole ballad at the age of eight. She published her first poems while still in school, debuting in 1931—at the age of 14—with the poem "Uczta wakacyjna" ("A Vacation Feast"), published in her bimonthly high-school newspaper Echa Szkolne (School Echoes), edited by Czesław Janczarski. During this period of her life, Ginczanka was also active as the author of song lyrics.

Her "mainstream" poetry debut in a nationwide forum came in August 1933 in the pages of the Kuryer Literacko-Naukowy (Literary-Scientific Courier), a Sunday supplement to the well-known Ilustrowany Kuryer Codzienny (Illustrated Daily Courier), with the publication of the 16-line poem entitled "Żyzność sierpniowa" ("Fertility in the Month of August"—or perhaps, with greater poetic licence, "Fullness of August"). In this poem, the 16-year-old poet speaks with the voice of a mature woman wistfully looking back on the world of young people in the bloom of life with its ripeness for love (hence the title), from the knowing and indulgent perspective of one whose life has come to fruition long before. The last two lines, moreover, give voice to the catastrophic sonorities that would forever remain the signature trait of Ginczanka's poetry, often couched in sanguinary imagery as they are here:

W gałęziach gruszy zawisł wam księżyc, jak choinkowe złociste czółno, a w wargach malin milczą legendy o sercach, które skrwawiła północ — —

The Moon stranded in pear-tree branches like a golden pirogue on a Christmas tree, on lips of raspberry the legends fall silent of the hearts bloodied by a midnight's decree — —

Encouraged by Julian Tuwim to participate in the Young Poets' Competition (Turniej Młodych Poetów) organised the following spring by the most important literary periodical in Poland at the time—a weekly, the Wiadomości Literackie (Literary News)—she won an honourable mention (third class) with the poem "Gramatyka" ("Grammar"), printed in the issue of 15 July 1934, devoted in part to the results of the competition. She was 17 years old; most if not all of the other 22 finalists (like Tadeusz Hollender, b. 1910, and Anna Świrszczyńska, b. 1909, who won first prizes, or Witold Makowiecki, b. 1903, who won an honourable mention, first class, and Juliusz Żuławski, b. 1910, honourable mention, third class) were her seniors in age. Seven weeks later, in its edition of 2 September 1934, the Wiadomości Literackie revisited its poetry competition by publishing a list of additional book prizes awarded to the winners, mentioning that for her contribution, Ginczanka would receive a collection of Michelangelo's poetry, translated by Leopold Staff.

Ginczanka's poem, which opens boldly with a punctuation mark (a left parenthesis), deals with parts of speech, describing each in a poetic way beginning with the adjective, then taking on the adverb, and ending with a philosophical-philological analysis of the personal pronoun ("I without you, you without me, amounts to nought"; line 30):

a pokochać słowa tak łatwo: trzeba tylko wziąć je do ręki i obejrzeć jak burgund — pod światło

for words freely do love incite: you just take them in hand and assay like burgundies — against the light

To this period also belongs Ginczanka's poem "Zdrada" ("Betrayal", although the word can also mean "treason"), composed at some point in 1934.

=== Warsaw period ===
Upon her arrival in Warsaw in September 1935 at the age of 18, Ginczanka, by then already notable, quickly became a "legendary figure" of the bohemian world of artists of pre-war Warsaw as a protégée of Tuwim, the doyen of the Polish poets at the time. This connection opened the doors for her to all the country's most important literary periodicals, salons, and publishing houses. Her detractors bestowed on her the sobriquet of "Tuwim in a petticoat", Tuwim w spódnicy; Witold Gombrowicz, known for inventing his own private names for all his acquaintances, nicknamed her "Gina".

High-caliber critics, such as Karol Wiktor Zawodziński, have traced aspects of Ginczanka's lyricism to the poetic achievement of Tuwim, deemed both indefinable and inimitable but primarily concerning the renewed focus on the word, its freshness, and the ultimate conciseness of expression respective of each particular poetic image or vision treated. Jarosław Iwaszkiewicz, for his part, recalls that Ginczanka was "very good" as a poet from the first, without any initial incubation period of her poetic talent, and—conscious of her literary prowess—kept herself apart from literary groupings, in particular to distance herself publicly from the Skamander circle with which she would have normally been associated by others. For example, her frequenting of the Mała Ziemiańska café, the renowned haunt of the Warsaw literati where with gracious ease she held court at Gombrowicz's table, was memorialised in her poem "Pochwała snobów" ("In Praise of Snobs"), published in the satirical magazine Szpilki (Pins) in 1937.

Szilpi's co-founder, the artist Eryk Lipiński, who would play an important role in salvaging Ginczanka's manuscripts after the war, later named his daughter Zuzanna in memory of her. The other co-founder, Zbigniew Mitzner, later opined in his memoirs that Ginczanka was tied to this particular weekly magazine by the closest bonds of all the alliances that she maintained with the literary press.

In testimony to her fame, she would sometimes herself be the subject of satirical poems and drawings published in literary periodicals, as for example in the Wiadomości Literackie's 1937 Christmas issue, in which she is pictured in the collective cartoon representing the cream of Polish literature, next to Andrzej Nowicki and Janusz Minkiewicz, both holding Cupid's bows although their arrows point discreetly away from her rather than towards.

==== Impressions ====
Ginczanka was a woman of striking beauty—"the beauty of a Byzantine icon", in the words of the slightly older writer Ryszard Matuszewski, who remembered her visits to the Zodiak café in Warsaw—many of her fellow writers remarking on her eyes in particular, enhanced by a misalignment of their visual axes called the strabismus of Venus, and on the attractive harmony between her physical appearance and her personality. Jan Kott, in fact, saw a connection between her poetry "which enthuses all" and her personal beauty, writing that "there was something of a Persian qasida in both". Her Italian translator, Alessandro Amenta, took this line of reasoning further, opining that for her admirers, her body merged with her text. For Kazimierz Brandys, her peer in age, she was a "sacred apparition" with "the eyes of a fawn".

The author Adolf Rudnicki, casting for an apt expression to describe her, settled on "Rose of Sharon" (Róża z Saronu), a trope from the biblical Song of Songs, adding that a painter identified by him only as "C."—for whom she posed in the nude in the presence of her husband—confessed to him "to have never set his eyes on anything quite so beautiful in his life". Her well-known portrait by the noted Polish painter Aleksander Rafałowski (1894–1980) was reproduced in Wiadomości Literackie in 1937.

She was admired by many for many reasons. Czesław Miłosz says that the writer Zbigniew Mitzner, co-founder of the magazine Szpilki, was romantically involved with her. She was known to repulse her suitors en masse, however, sometimes thereby, as in the case of Leon Pasternak, earning their enmity with the result of their publishing satirical pasquinades at her expense in revenge. For Stanisław Piętak, one of the most distinguished Polish poets of the Interwar period, to meet her in the street was an experience akin to encountering a star break away from the heavens above and land straight on the pavement next to oneself. There is evidence that while outwardly she received all the adulation with gracious warmth, the attention she generated weighed heavy on her mind; as she reportedly confided in a female friend, Maria Zenowicz, "I feel like a Negro"—that is, as a curio. Only the poet Andrzej Nowicki was seen to enjoy her favour for a time, but even he was deemed by Tadeusz Wittlin to be merely a companion of convenience without relational entanglement.

Ginczanka was viewed as abstemious, of studiedly modest demeanour, and virtuous—she did not smoke or drink ("except for a few drops now and then under the duress of social propriety"): Wittlin calls her "Virtuous Zuzanna (Cnotliwa Zuzanna) in the literal [that is, ecclesiastical] sense". This perception was shared by others, including the poet Alicja Iwańska, whose literary journey largely coincided with Ginczanka's, who recalled that despite the exquisite poetry that she kept publishing in the country's best literary journals and a personal beauty that had a dazzling effect on onlookers, Ginczanka was often diffident, given to blushing, and stammered when put on the spot.

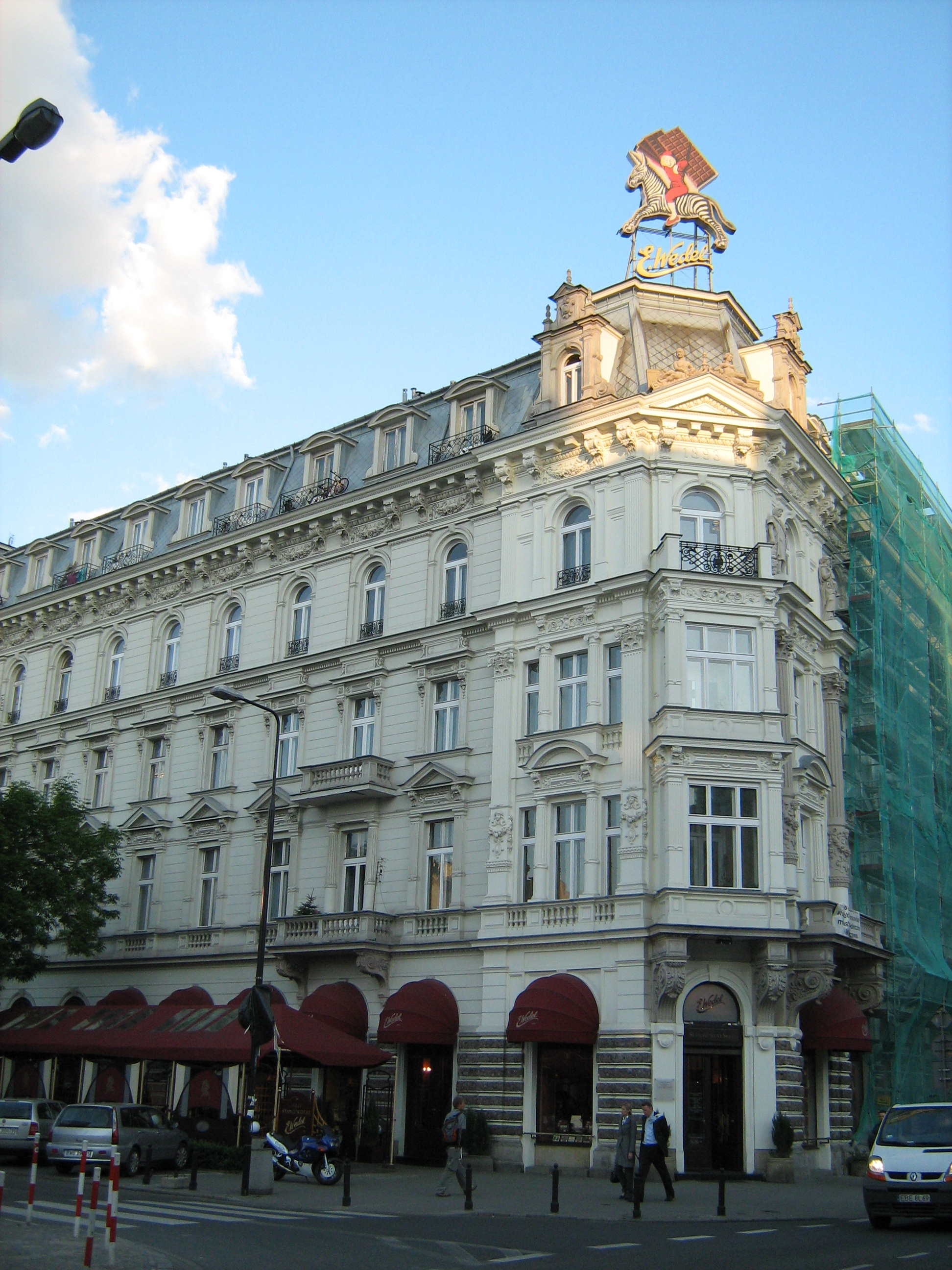
Apartment building at corner of ulica Szpitalna and ulica Przeskok in Warsaw, where Ginczanka resided in late 1930s.

Józef Łobodowski, perhaps the most serious contender for her hand between 1933 and 1938, dedicated several poems to her published in the Wiadomości Literackie and later in the Polish émigré press, as well as devoting to her one of his last collections of poetry, Pamięci Sulamity (In Remembrance of the Shulamite Woman), with a valuable autobiographical introduction. Although the poet Jan Śpiewak, of all the Polish littérateurs, could claim the longest acquaintance with Ginczanka because he had been a resident of Równe contemporaneously with her and shared her Jewish background and status as a Volhynian settler from the lands of the former Russian Empire, it is Łobodowski's subsequent recollections that will strike the most intimate chord among all the reminiscences published after the war by those who knew Ginczanka personally, betraying an undying love and affection on his part carried over an entire lifetime.

With the kind of celebrity Ginczanka enjoyed, her apartment on ulica Szpitalna (Szpitalna Street) in Warsaw (picture at right) was transformed into premier literary salon of Poland on special occasions such as her birthdays and name-days. Eryk Lipiński reports that it was there he saw the famed author Witold Gombrowicz in the flesh for the first time.

==== Publication ====
Although Ginczanka published only a single collection of poetry in her lifetime, the book O centaurach (About Centaurs), it created a sensation. She explained the title by pointing to the dual nature of the centaur, a mythological creature that was part man, part horse—here adopted as a simile for her poetical project of uniting in verse the disparate qualities of sagacity and sensuality, "tightly conjoined at the waist like a centaur". This is especially significant to feminist literary theory, as it presents a vision of what have traditionally been considered male and female elements fused together in art and life. For those who had not heard of Ginczanka before, the first exposure to her verses was often an awakening.

The testimony of the poet Tadeusz Bocheński may be cited as a case in point, all the more valuable for having been expressed in a private letter not intended for public consumption. Writing in February 1936 to the editor-in-chief of the Kamena (Stone) literary monthly, Kazimierz Andrzej Jaworski, Bocheński excoriates the well-known poets Tuwim and Maria Pawlikowska-Jasnorzewska while at the same time stating the following:

Jastrun inspires interest, [as does] Ginczanka, otherwise unknown to me: I feel instinctively that we are dealing here with a deeper nature, with poetry of a higher pedigree (rasowsza poezja); who is she? where is this lady coming from?

One of the most distinguished modern Ukrainian poets (and the one most hated by the Soviets), Yevhen Malanyuk (1897–1968), then living in exile in Warsaw, on his introduction to Ginczanka's poetry by Tuwim ran breathlessly into the editorial offices of the Biuletyn Polsko-Ukraiński (Polish-Ukrainian Bulletin) with the news of the revelation from a new "excellent poetess".

Ginczanka did not hesitate to lend her art to the furtherance of a social cause, as shown in her poem "Słowa na wiatr" ("Words To the Four Winds"), published in the Wiadomości Literackie in March 1937, impugning the honesty of the country's authorities and industrial groups in making promises to render assistance to those in need during the difficult winter period. Her voice here is biting and derisive: "they count, and count, and lick their fingers, and count some more"—that is, they count the remaining winter pages on the tear-off wall calendar and the money to be saved—as she accuses the potentates of stalling for time in the hope that the cold spell would pass and so they would not have to make good on their pledges.

==== Radio dramas ====
Ginczanka wrote several radio dramas for the Polish national broadcaster, Polskie Radjo (Polish Radio). In July 1937, her programme Pod dachami Warszawy (Under the Roofs of Warsaw), authored jointly with Nowicki, was broadcast. In March 1938, the Polish press carried an announcement of another radio drama jointly authored by Ginczanka with Nowicki, Sensacje amerykańskie (American Sensations), on the theme of Sherlock Holmes's journey to America, broadcast by Polskie Radjo.

=== Intimations of war ===
As observed by attentive readers such as Monika Warneńska, Ginczanka had prophetically foreseen the onset of the World War II and the annihilation it would bring, but expressed it all with poetic touches so delicate that their true import might have been missed before the event. Such is her poem entitled "Maj 1939" ("May 1939"), published on the first page of the Wiadomości Literackie, the premier literary periodical in pre-War Poland, before the outbreak of the war several months later that year.

The poem is surrounded on all sides by a long article by Edward Boyé analysing Italian Fascism, the only other piece on the page. Ginczanka's poem, deceptively insouciant and almost ebullient in tone, while considering the uncertainty as to whether spring might pass under the shadow of war or alternatively under the spell of love, employs the metaphor of the fork in the road, in which either of the two divergent arms—although ostensibly very different and going in opposite directions—does in fact lead "to the last things" ("do spraw ostatecznych", line 28). Thus, in a twist on Robert Frost's famous poem "The Road Not Taken", in Ginczanka's poem it makes no difference to take "the one less travelled by" or the other:

Na maju, rozstaju stoję u dróg rozdrożnych i sprzecznych, gdy obie te drogi twoje wiodą do spraw ostatecznych.

I stand at the forking of May where road bifurcate at odds springs while both those roads per se lead to the ultimate things.

== Invasion of Poland ==
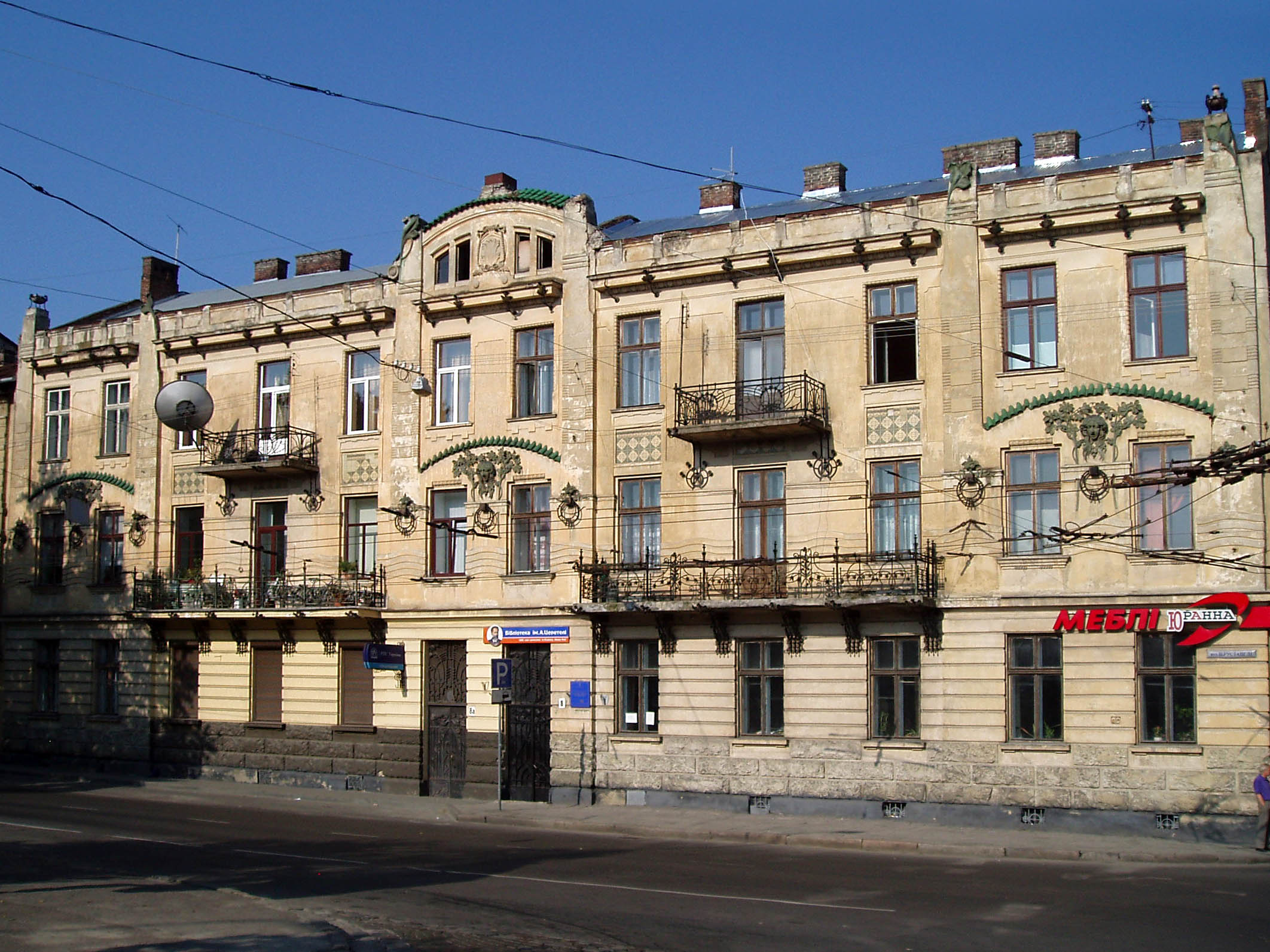
Building at ulica Jabłonowskich 8a (now ulica Rustaveli, renamed for Georgian poet Shota Rustaveli) in Lviv, where Ginczanka lived in 1939–1942 and where she was betrayed to the Nazis (2011 photo).

Ginczanka left Warsaw in June 1939 to spend her summer vacations with her grandmother in Równe Wołyńskie (Volhynia), as was her habit each year. Here she was caught by the outbreak of World War II, occasioned by the invasion of Poland by Nazi Germany on Friday, 1 September 1939, and in reaction to this news decided to stay at Równe, which was relatively sheltered from the hostilities of war because of its location in Poland's Eastern Borderlands. This, however, changed dramatically just two weeks later with the Soviet Union's attack on Poland from the East on 17 September, which brought Soviet rule to Równe, a town never to be returned to Poland again, and with it communist harassment and attacks targeting the "bourgeois elements" and propertied classes in particular.

Ginczanka's grandmother Klara Sandberg's ground-floor pharmacy on the town's main street was immediately expropriated. Their second-story living quarters were in large measure requisitioned for Soviet officials, squeezing the owners, including Ginczanka, into a single servant's room. These developments forced upon Ginczanka the decision to leave Równe to try to find accommodation in the much larger Polish city of Lviv, 213 km (132.35 mi) to the southeast and likewise occupied by the Soviet Union. Before departure, her grandmother packed all the family heirlooms and valuables like table silver into her luggage, both as a means to preserve her ownership of the movable property and to provide for Ginczanka's future dowry.

In Lviv Ginczanka rented a flat in the apartment building at ulica Jabłonowskich 8a (pictured to the right), where her co-residents included Karol Kuryluk, and the writers Władysław Bieńkowski (1906–1991), Marian Eile (1910–1984), and Franciszek Gil (1917–1960). From1939 to 1942, Ginczanka lived in Lviv in occupied Poland, working as an editor and writing several Soviet propaganda poems. She narrowly managed to avoid arrest by Ukrainian forces targeting the city's Jewish population because of her Nansen passport, which, being unfamiliar to them, impressed them sufficiently to spare her.

Early in 1940, at the age of 22, she married the Polish-Jewish art historian Michał Weinzieher, her senior in age by 14 years (16 years, in some accounts) in Lviv, a move she did not elect to explain to her friends. Although officially married to Weinzieher, however, she carried on a contemporaneous relationship with Janusz Woźniakowski, a young Polish graphic designer who was quite devoted to her poetry. He helped her avoid detection after Nazi Germany's invasion of Lviv late in June 1941 and offered her general moral support. In the report of the writer Franciszek Gil (1917–1960), who lived in the same apartment building as Ginczanka, for Woźniakowski she became the sole reason for his existence.

During this period, she was very active literarily, composing many new poems which, although unpublished, were read during small gatherings of friends. Most of the manuscripts with these works have perished; very few were recreated after the war from memory by those who had come to know them by heart.

Non omnis moriar. My grand estate—
Tablecloth meadows, invincible wardrobe castles,
Acres of bedsheets, finely woven linens,
And dresses, colourful dresses—will survive me.
I leave no heirs.
So let your hands rummage through Jewish things,
You, Chomin's wife from Lviv, you mother of a volksdeutscher.
May these things be useful to you and yours,
For, dear ones, I leave no name, no song.
I am thinking of you, as you, when the Schupo came,
Thought of me, in fact reminded them about me.
So let my friends break out holiday goblets,
Celebrate my wake and their wealth:
Kilims and tapestries, bowls, candlesticks.
Let them drink all night and at daybreak
Begin their search for gemstones and gold
In sofas, mattresses, blankets and rugs.
Oh how the work will burn in their hands!
Clumps of horsehair, bunches of sea hay,
Clouds of fresh down from pillows and quilts,
Glued on by my blood, will turn their arms into wings,
Transfigure the birds of prey into angels.

"Non omnis moriar"
translated by Nancy Kassell and Anita Safran

With Nazi Germany's invasion of Poland's Eastern Borderlands on 22 June 1941, an area previously occupied by the Soviet Union since 17 September 1939, the situation of the Jewish population once again greatly changed for the worse, the Holocaust being already in full swing at that time. In Równe, Klara Sandberg, Ginczanka's grandmother and closest relative in Poland, was arrested by the Nazis and died of a heart attack induced by the horror of impending death while being transported to a place of execution at Zdołbunów, barely 17 km (10.56 mi) away.

In Lviv, the female concierge in the building where Ginczanka lived, resentful of having allocated space in her building to a refugee like Ginczanka in the first place, saw her opportunity to rid herself of the unwelcome tenant and at the same time to enrich herself. In the summer of 1942, she denounced Ginczanka to the Nazi authorities newly in power in town as a Jew hiding in her building on false papers. The Nazi police immediately attempted to arrest Ginczanka, but other residents of the building helped her avoid arrest by slipping out the back door. On one single day, the Schupo (state protection police) made three separate raids on the building to arrest her and finally succeeded in capturing her.

Although it was a narrow brush with death, this arrest did not result in Ginczanka's execution because she escaped from captivity. Sources differ as to the exact circumstances. According to the court documents from the post-war trial of Zofja Chomin, as reported in the press (see the Aftermath section below), she managed to escape from her captors after being brought to the police station but before being securely imprisoned. According to other sources, her friends managed to redeem her from Nazi hands by bribery. Whatever the details, the incident led Ginczanka to write her best-known poem "Non omnis moriar" (Latin: "Not All of Me Will Die"). (See insert to the right).

=== Kraków period ===
In September 1942 Michał Weinzieher, Ginczanka's husband, decided to leave Lviv to escape the internment in the Lwów Ghetto. They moved to Kraków in the hope that a large city where he was unknown would provide him the anonymity necessary for survival on false papers. His younger brother had already been killed two years earlier by the Soviets in the Katyn Massacre, and Weinzieher was literally running away from death. During his stay in Kraków with the Güntner family, Weinzieher—unwisely for the times—continued to pursue his left-wing political activism and to maintain contacts with underground left-wing political parties. It is here, and in these circumstances, that he was joined a few months later by Ginczanka, whose false papers indicated that she was of Armenian nationality.

In the few months between Weinzieher's and Ginczanka's arrivals in Kraków, she spent time with Woźniakowski at his aunt's home in Felsztyn, 97 km (60.27 mi) southwest of Lviv, where she was presented as his fiancée. Woźniakowski also provided the false papers on which Ginczanka and Weinzieher travelled.

In Kraków Ginczanka occupied a room next door to Weinzieher's, spending most of her time in bed. According to her hosts, Ginczanka used to say, "My creative juices flow from my laziness". Her most frequent visitor was Woźniakowski, but she also maintained close contacts with the noted painter Helena Cygańska-Walicka (1913–1989), the wife of art historian Michał Walicki, Anna Rawicz, and others. Because Ginczanka's exotic beauty, even on her rare outings on the street, was attracting the unwelcome attention of passers-by, she decided to change her hideaway by moving to the then-suburban spa locality of Swoszowice on the southern outskirts of Kraków, joining up with a childhood friend from Równe, Blumka Fradis, who was also hiding there from the Nazis.

At the beginning of 1944, apparently by pure accident, Woźniakowski was arrested in a mass łapanka or random round-up of Polish citizens on the street. A laundry receipt found on him indicated the address of Ginczanka's old hideout, no longer occupied by her but where Woźniakowski continued to live with Weinzieher. During a search of the premises, which a bloodied Woźniakowski was made to witness, Ginczanka's husband was arrested. On 6 April 1944, an announcement issued by the Summary Tribunal of the Security Police (Standgericht der Sicherheitspolizei) was pasted on the walls of Kraków, listing 112 people sentenced to death, on the first 33 of whom the sentence of death had already been carried out. Woźniakowski's name was fifth on the list, Weinzieher's further down.

=== Arrest ===
Ginczanka frequently changed hiding places, the last being in the apartment of Holocaust rescuer Elżbieta Mucharska, at ulica Mikołajska 5 in the heart of Kraków Old Town. The circumstances of Ginczanka's arrest were later pondered upon by post-war memoirists, with different accounts of it.

The first account is that of Wincentyna Wodzinowska-Stopkowa (1915–1991), published in her 1989 memoir Portret artysty z żoną w tle (A Portrait of the Artist with His Wife in the Background). Ginczanka's hideout and the passwords used by her rescuers were intercepted by the Gestapo from several clandestine messages intended to be smuggled out of prison and addressed to them. The Stopkowas, who were themselves incriminated by the clandestine messages, managed to get the Gestapo to leave without arresting them by bribing them with bottles of liquor and gold coins, "which disappeared into their pockets in a flash." As soon as the Gestapo were safely away, Wodzinowska-Stopkowa rushed to Ginczanka's nearby hideout to forewarn her of imminent danger, only to be greeted at the door by a woman who sobbed, "They took her already. She yelled, spat at them..." Wodzinowska-Stopkowa then ran breathlessly to the residences of all the other people named in the "kites" written by Woźniakowski, arriving in each case too late, after the arrests of the individuals concerned.

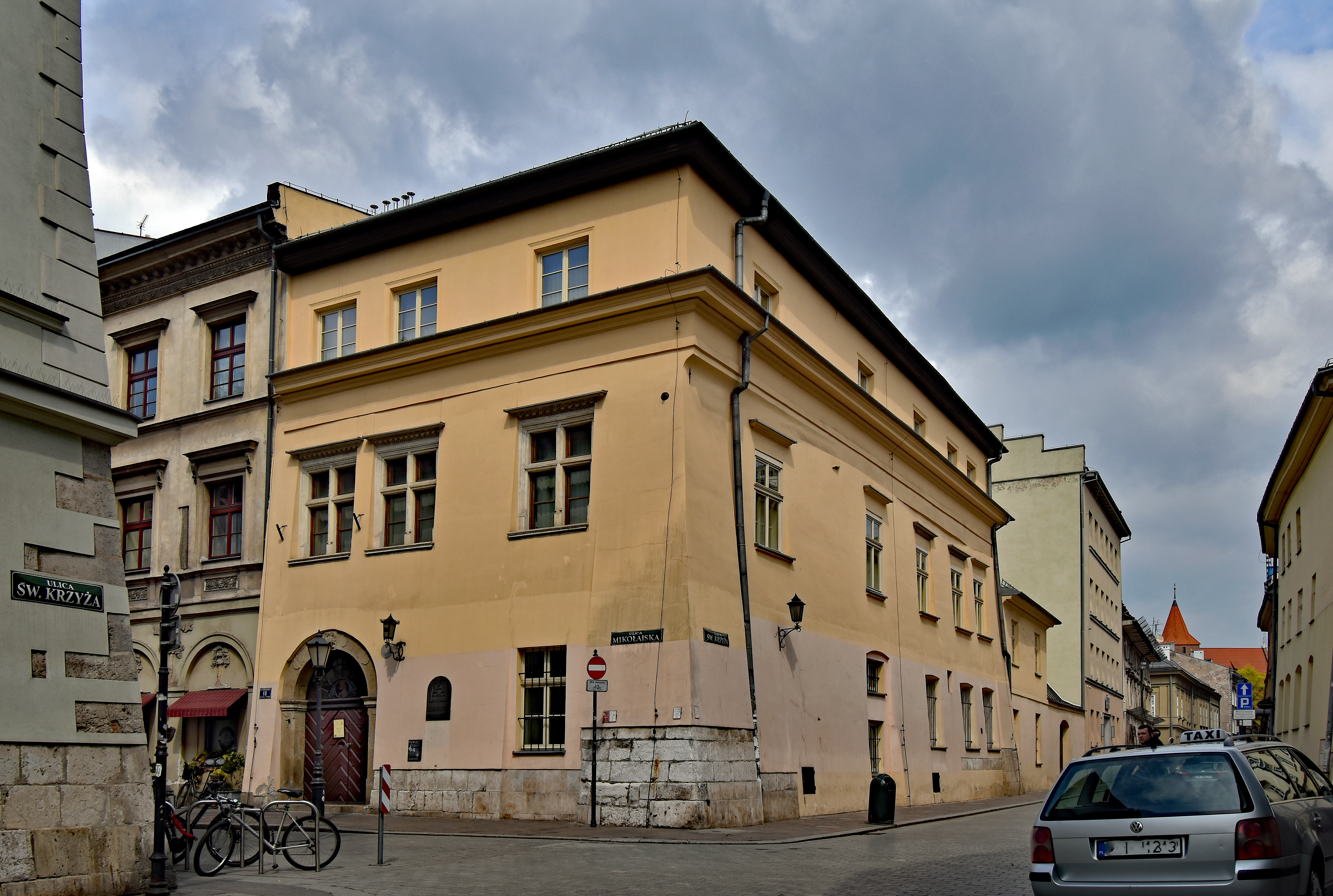
16th-century house at ulica Mikołajska 18 in Kraków, directly across from #5, where Ginczanka lived in 1944 and from which Jerzy Tomczak witnessed her arrest.

A separate account of Ginczanka's arrest was given orally to Professor Izolda Kiec of the University of Poznań, in January 1991 (46 years after the event) by Jerzy Tomczak, grandson of Elżbieta Mucharska, Ginczanka's last hostess in Kraków, and included in Kiec's 1994 book Zuzanna Ginczanka: życie i twórczość (Zuzanna Ginczanka: Life and Work; see Bibliography), to date the most serious book on Ginczanka.

At the time of Ginczanka's arrest in the autumn of 1944, Tomczak was 10 years old, living in one room of the apartment with her for about a month or so. He recalled that during her stay, she never left the premises even once for security reasons or opened the door if she were alone. The only visitor she received was a high-school friend of hers, "a blonde without Semitic features", Blumka Fradis. Returning from school one day he was intercepted on the stairs by a neighbour who told him to back off: "They are at your place..." He went into the entryway of the apartment building across the street, pictured to the right. From this vantage point about a half hour later, he observed Ginczanka and Fradis being escorted by the Gestapo out of his building. He commented: "I have no idea how they managed to track them down. I suspect a denunciation by a neighbour. There is no other possibility."

=== Notes from prison ===
Kiec, the author of the 1994 book on Ginczanka, was able to track down a person who was in direct contact with her after her final arrest in autumn of 1944: Krystyna Garlicka, sister of the Polish writer Tadeusz Breza (1905–1970), who lived in Paris in 1992. Garlicka had been incarcerated with Ginczanka in the same cell at one point, and developed a rapport with her that made her privy to her confessions and much of her ultimate fate unknown to outsiders. According to Garlicka's report given to Kiec in 1992 (47 years after the event), Ginczanka accepted her because she was acquainted with her brother, Tadeusz Breza. They slept together on a single straw mattress spread out on the floor for the night. According to Garlicka, Ginczanka told her that her final arrest was due to betrayal by her Kraków hostess Elżbieta Mucharska, as she never left the house and "no one had any knowledge of her whereabouts".

Detained at first in Montelupich Prison, Ginczanka was very afraid of torture, for which that prison was infamous; and to stave off attacks on her body, she affected particular concern for her hair, repeatedly touching it during interrogations to make small styling corrections. This was noticed by the Gestapo interrogators, and when they came to torment her it was her hair they selected for special treatment, dragging her across the floor by the hair. Although she screamed in pain, she was never broken or nor ever admitted to being Jewish.

This, however, was not the case with her friend Fradis, who broke down, as Garlicka commented, because "perhaps she lacked the courage and the willpower of Ginczanka". Fradis made a confession that spelt the end of the investigations and "sealed the fate for both of them". Ginczanka, resolving to overcome everything and survive, was hoping to be deported in the aftermath to the Kraków-Płaszów concentration camp and thence to Auschwitz. This, however, did not happen, as she was transferred to another prison in Kraków.

=== Place and date of death ===
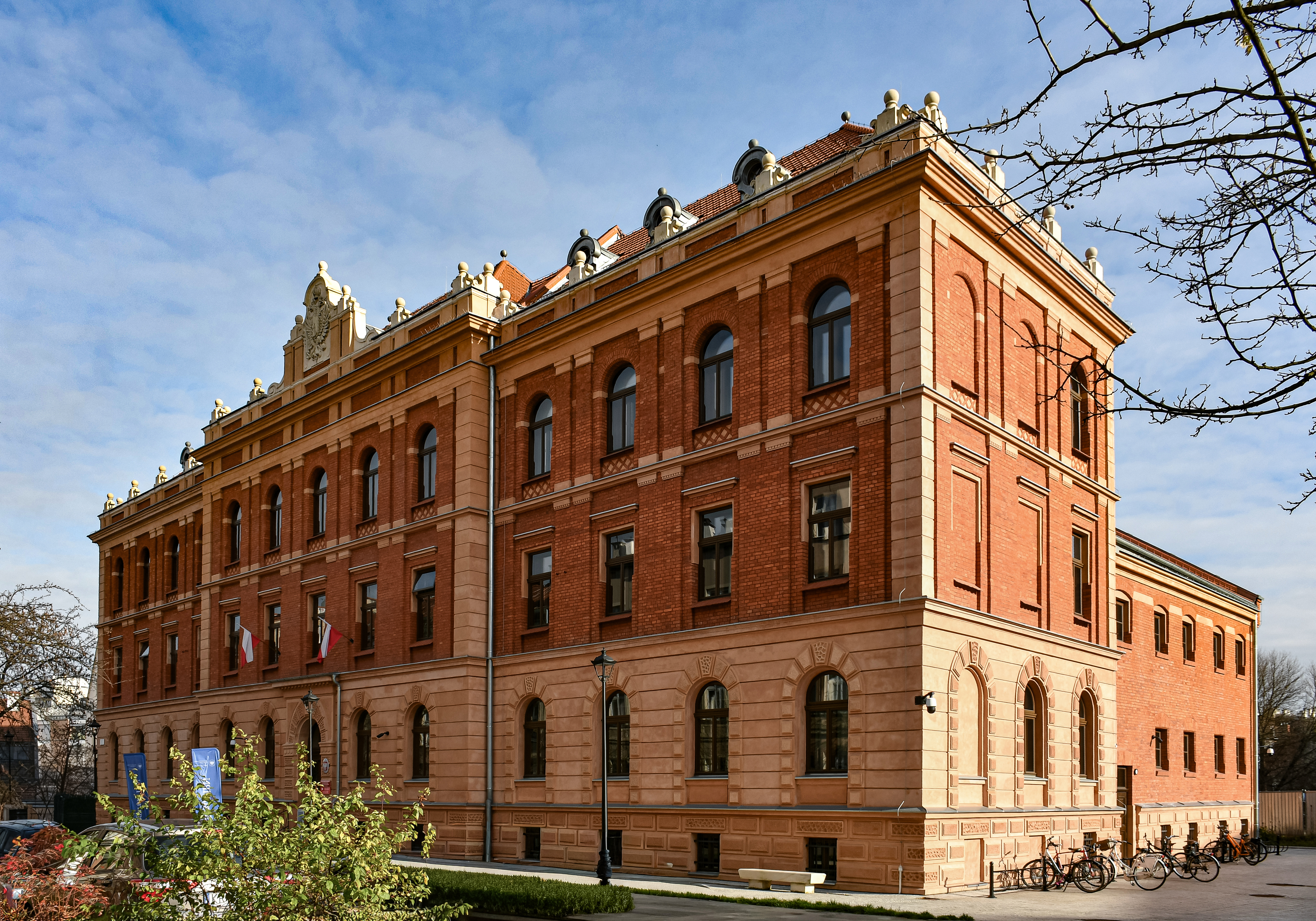
Back side of Kraków-Podgórze Detention Centre (note blocked-out windows), ulica Stefana Czarnieckiego 3 in Kraków, facing courtyard where Ginczanka was executed (2011 photo). The building, originally designed as a courthouse by Polish-Jewish architect Ferdynand Liebling .(1877–1942), was built in 1905.

There is no consensus among the published sources as to the exact place of Ginczanka's death. There is, however, broad consensus on the circumstance of her having been executed by firearm, either by a single firearm or by a firing squad, in a prison located in Kraków's southern suburbs. Many older sources identify the suburb in question as Płaszów (administratively part of the municipality of Kraków since 1912, but colloquially referred to as a separate community)—not, however, to be confused with the Nazi concentration camp of the same name in the same locality. No claim has ever been made that Ginczanka was deported to any concentration camp.

Other sources identify the suburb in question to have been the neighbouring spa locality of Swoszowice (also today within the southern borders of Kraków municipality). Later, the courtyard of the infamous Montelupich Prison was pointed out as the place of her death; but this identification, perhaps conjectural, would contradict the earlier sources, as the prison is in the city center, not in the southern confines of the metropolitan area.

Finally, and perhaps most authoritatively, Izolda Kiec (see Bibliography), basing her conclusions on unpublished written sources as well as on the numerous oral interviews with eyewitnesses and others directly connected with Ginczanka's life conducted in the 1970s and 1980s, indicated the courtyard of the Kraków-Podgórze Detention Centre at ulica Stefana Czarnieckiego 3 in Kraków for the first time as the place of Ginczanka's execution (see picture to the right). This identification does not contradict the earlier sources citing Płaszów, as both the Płaszów precinct and ulica Stefana Czarnieckiego 3 are in the same southern Kraków district of Podgórze. Moreover, Kiec also stated—thereby possibly reconciling all the earlier sources—that Ginczanka was indeed imprisoned at first in Montelupich Prison, where her interrogation under torture took place, and that only afterwards was transferred to the smaller Kraków-Podgórze Detention Centre, where she was executed at the age of 27 together with her high-school friend Blumka Fradis in the courtyard.

Łobodowski reports privileged information he received in the 1980s from an unnamed source that Ginczanka's execution took place "just before" (tuż przed) the liberation of Kraków on 18 January 1945. Without specifying the 1945 date, Kiec says much the same thing ("a few days (na kilka dni) before the end of the war"). If the expressions "just before" and "a few days" were to be interpreted figuratively to mean "a short time" but not necessarily "a very short time", the date of Ginczanka's death could be pushed back to December 1944, although this would involve stretching the literal meaning of the words of these two key witnesses.

Wacław Iwaniuk, a personal acquaintance of Ginczanka, strongly corroborates this dating of Ginczanka's death. In an interview given in 1991, he stated: "Ginczanka was murdered by the Gestapo in Kraków, probably on the last day of Kraków's occupation" (chyba w ostatnim dniu okupacji Krakowa)—that is, on 17 January 1945.

However, in an article published in the Gazeta Wyborcza (Wyborcza Gazette) in December 2015, Ryszard Kotarba, the historian of the Kraków-Płaszów concentration camp, speculates that Ginczanka might have been among several prisoners brought there by truck on 5 May 1944, most of whom were executed on the spot.

==== "Non omnis moriar" ====
Ginczanka's single best-known poem, written in 1942 and untitled but commonly referred to as "Non omnis moriar" from its opening words, the incipit of an ode by Horace, incorporating the name of her purported betrayer within the text, is a paraphrase of Juliusz Słowacki's poem "Testament mój" ("My Testament"). "Non omnis moriar" was first published in the Kraków weekly periodical Odrodzenie (Revival) in 1946 at the initiative of Julian Przyboś, a poet who had been one of the most distinguished members of the so-called Kraków avant-garde (Awangarda Krakowska). To it Przyboś appended a commentary entitled "Ostatni wiersz Ginczanki" ("Ginczanka's Last Poem"), commenting in part:

Hers is the most moving voice in Polish lyrical literature, for it deals with the most terrible tragedy of our time, the Jewish martyrdom. Only the poems of Jastrun, serving as they are as an epitaph on the sepulchre of millions, make a similar impression, but not even do they evince the same degree of bitterness, of irony, of virulence and power or convey the same brutal truth as does the testament of Ginczanka. I find its impact impossible to shake off. We read it for the first time pencilled on a torn and wrinkled piece of paper, like the secret messages that prisoners smuggle out of their dungeons. (…) The most despairing confessions, the most heartrending utterances of other poets before their death fall far below this proudest of all poetic testaments. This indictment of the human beast hurts like an unhealed wound. A shock therapy in verse.

"Non omnis moriar" was highly esteemed by many others, including the poet Stanislaw Wygodzki. Another Polish poet, Anna Kamieńska, considered it one of the most beautiful poems in the Polish language. Scholars have uncovered textual parallels between "Non omnis moriar" and the Petit Testament of François Villon. But perhaps the most significant aspect of "Non omnis moriar" is its indictment of Polish antisemitism by a Jewish woman who wished more than anything else to become a Polish poet and to be accepted as Polish rather than as an "exotic Other". In her entire oeuvre, Ginczanka never espoused anything like a Jewish identity, her preoccupations with identity having been focused exclusively on being a woman. It is the reference made in "Non omnis moriar" to the "Jewish things" ("rzeczy żydowskie", line 6)—Ginczanka's personal effects that would now be looted by her betrayer, the 30 pieces of Jewish silver earned by (and in ethnic contrast with) this kiss of an Aryan Judas—that takes Ginczanka out of the sphere of realisation of her dream.

=== Aftermath ===
In January 1946 on charges of collaborationism Ginczanka's betrayer before the Nazis, Zofja Chomin and her son Marjan Chomin were arrested and tried in a court of law. Ginczanka's poem "Non omnis moriar" formed part of the evidence against them, something considered by many scholars as the only instance in the annals of juridical history of a poem being entered in evidence at a criminal trial. According to an article in the newspaper Express Wieczorny (Evening Express) of 5 July 1948 (page 2), Chomin, the concierge in the building where Ginczanka lived in Lviv, was sentenced to four years' imprisonment for betraying her identity to the Nazis, the poem "Non omnis moriar" again being cited in the writ of the sentence. Her son, however, was acquitted. Chomin's defence before the court were to be her words, intended to refute the charge of collaborationism: "I knew of only one little Jewess in hiding..." ("znałam tylko jedną żydóweczkę ukrywającą się..."). An account of these events is provided in a study by Agnieszka Haska (see Bibliography).

== Remembrance ==
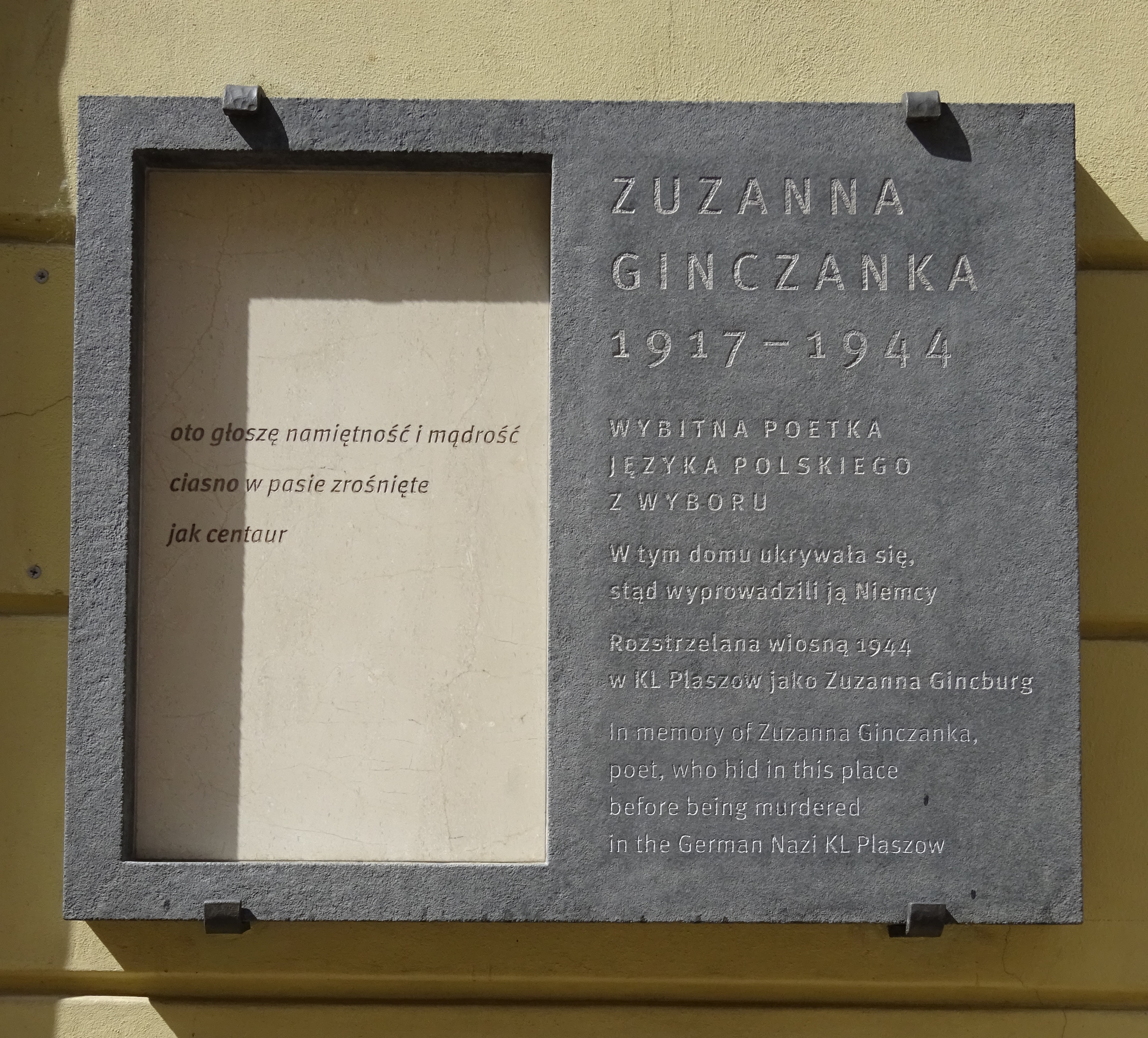
A commemorative plaque devoted to Ginczanka, ulica Mikołajska, Kraków.

Despite the quality of her poetry, Ginczanka was ignored and forgotten in postwar Poland, as communist censors deemed her work to be undesirable. Renewed interest and recognition of her work emerged only after communism's collapse in 1989.

Ginczanka is the subject of a moving poem by Sydor Rey entitled "Smak słowa i śmierci" ("The Taste of the Word and Death") and published in 1967, which ends: "I will know at the furthermost confines | The taste of your death".

Another poem in her honour is the composition "Zuzanna Ginczanka" by Dorota Chróścielewska (1948–1996).

In 1987, the poet Józef Łobodowski published a collection of poems in memory of Ginczanka entitled Pamięci Sulamity (In Memory of Sulamita).

In 1991, after Poland regained independence, a volume of her collected poems was published.

Izolda Kiec published two books devoted to Ginczanka: a biography entitled Zuzanna Ginczanka. Życie i twórczość (Zuzanna Ginczanka. Life and Works) in 1994 and Ginczanka. Nie upilnuje mnie nikt (Ginczanka: No One Can Keep Watch Over Me) in 2020.

In 2001, Agata Araszkiewicz published a book Wypowiadam wam moje życie. Melancholia Zuzanny Ginczanki (I Am Expressing My Life to You: The Melancholy of Zuzanna Ginczanka).

In 2003, the poet Maciej Woźniak dedicated a poem to Ginczanka in his collection of poems Obie strony światła (Both Sides of Light).

In 2015, the Museum of Literature in Warsaw hosted an exhibition devoted to the works of Ginczanka, Tylko szczęście jest prawdziwym życiem (Only Happiness Is Real Life).

In 2017, on the centenary of Ginczanka's birth, a commemorative plaque was unveiled on a tenement house on ulica Mikołajska in Kraków where she was in hiding during her stay in the city.

The same year, Marek Kazmierski translated and published the first book of her work in English.

In 2019, Jarosław Mikołajewski published a book about her life and literary legacy, Cień w cień. Za cieniem Zuzanny Ginczanki (Shadow upon Shadow: In the Shadow of Zuzanna Ginczanka).

In 2021, Hanna Kubiak and Bernhard Hofstötter published the first German edition of works by Ginczanka.

== Publications ==
Books

- O centaurach (About Centaurs) (1936)
- Wiersze wybrane (Selected Poems) (1953)
- Zuzanna Ginczanka [: wiersze] (Zuzanna Ginczanka [: Poems]) (1980)
- "Non omnis moriar" ("Not All of Me Will Die") (before 1990)
- Udźwignąć własne szczęście (To Bear One's Own Happiness) (1991)
- Krzątanina mglistych pozorów: wiersze wybrane (The Bustle of Misty Appearances: Selected Poems) = Un viavai di brumose apparenze: poesie scelte (2011; bilingual edition: text in Polish and Italian)
- Von Zentauren und weitere ausgewählte Gedichte (Of Centaurs and Other Selected Poems) (2021; German edition; ISBN 978-3347232334)

Translation

- Vladimir Mayakovsky, Wiersze (Vladimir Mayakovsky, Poems), translated into Polish by Zuzanna Ginczanka (1940)

Anthologies

- Sh. L. [Shemuʾel-Leyb] Shnayderman, Between Fear and Hope, tr. N. Guterman, New York, Arco Publishing Co., 1947. (Includes an English translation of "Non omnis moriar", pp. 262–263, perhaps the first publication of the poem, in any language, in book form. Important also for the background information on the situation of the Jews within Polish society in the immediate aftermath of World War II, shedding light on their situation before and during the war.)
- R. Matuszewski & S. Pollak, Poezja Polski Ludowej: antologia (Poetry of the People's Poland: An Anthology). Warsaw, Czytelnik, 1955. (Includes the original text of "Non omnis moriar", p. 397.)
- Ryszard Marek Groński, Od Stańczyka do STS-u: satyra polska lat 1944–1956 (From Stańczyk to STS: Polish Satire, 1944–1956), Warsaw, Wydawnictwa Artystyczne i Filmowe, 1975. (Includes the original text of "Non omnis moriar", p. 9.)
- I. Maciejewska, Męczeństwo i zagłada Żydów w zapisach literatury polskiej (The Martyrdom and Extermination of the Jews in Polish Literature), Warsaw, Krajowa Agencja Wydawnicza, 1988. ISBN 8303022792. (Includes the original text of "Non omnis moriar", p. 147.)
- R. Matuszewski & S. Pollak, Poezja polska 1914–1939: antologia (Polish Poetry 1914–1939: An Anthology), Warsaw, Czytelnik, 1962.
- Szczutek. Cyrulik Warszawski. Szpilki: 1919–1939 (The Warsaw Barber: Szpilki, 1919–1939), comp. & ed. E. Lipiński, introd. W. Filler, Warsaw, Wydawnictwa Artystyczne i Filmowe, 1975. (Includes Ginczanka's poem "Słówka" ("Vocabulary"), p. 145.)
- Poezja polska okresu międzywojennego: antologia, 2 vols., comp. & ed. M. Głowiński & J. Sławiński, Wrocław, Zakład Narodowy im. Ossolińskich, 1987.

== See also ==
- Betrayal of Anne Frank
- Henryka Łazowertówna
- Polish culture during World War II
