= Lazowert =

Łazowert (archaic feminine: Łazowertówna (unmarried), Łazowertowa (married) is a Polish-language Yiddish surname. Other variants of the surname include Lasowert and Lazovert. Notable people with this surname include:

- Henryka Łazowertówna (1909–1942), Polish Jewish poet
- Samuel Łazowert ( (1885–1937)) Polish Jewish revolutionary active in Poland and Soviet Russia, "Old Boshevik"
- Stanislav Lazovert (1887–1976), Russian doctor of Polish Jewish descent and conspirator in assassination of Grigory Rasputin.
