= Memorial to the Children, the Victims of the Holocaust =

Monument in Warsaw, Poland

- Pomnik Pamięci Dzieci – Ofiar Holokaustu
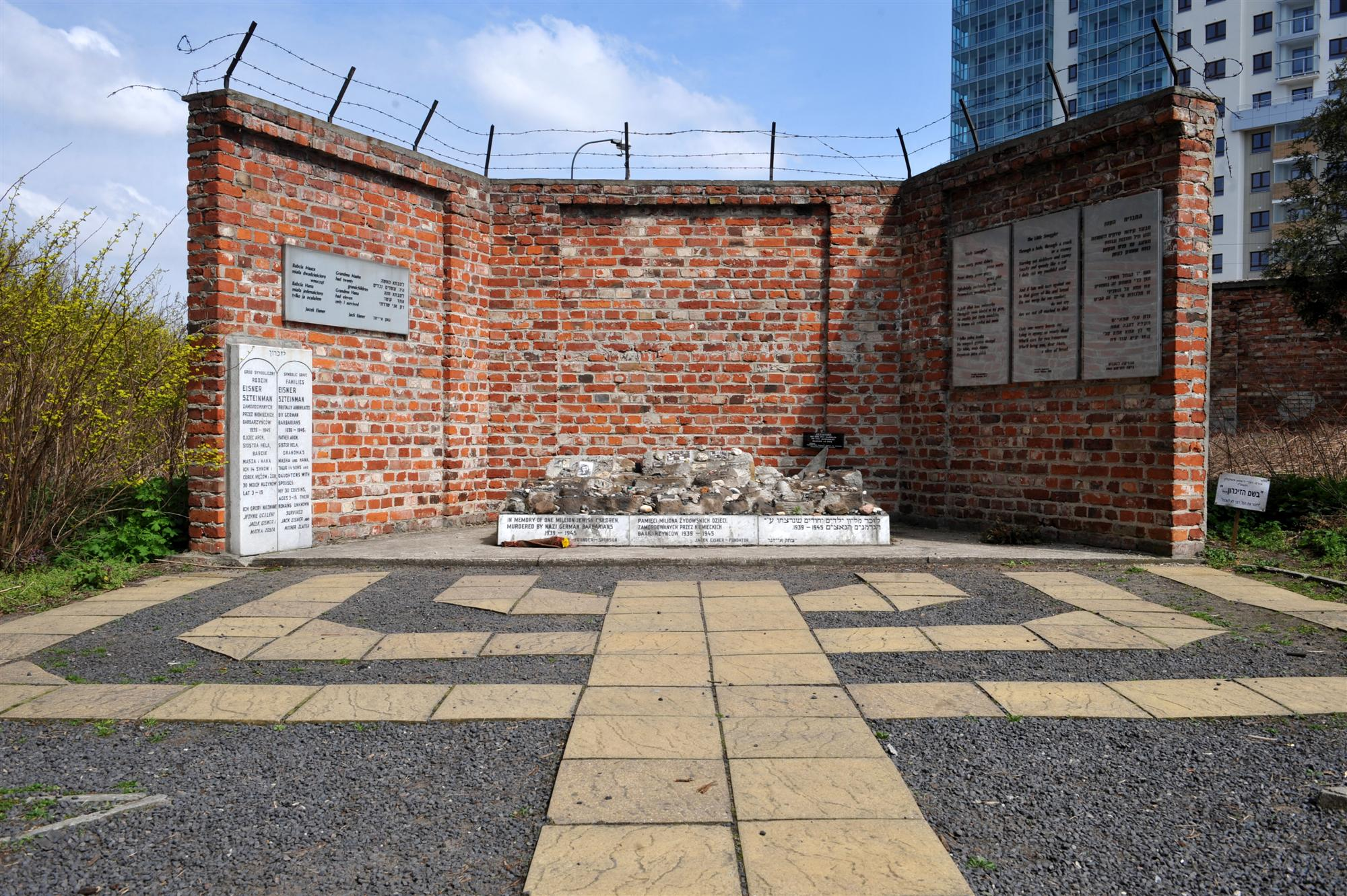
- 52°14′43″N 20°58′36″E
- Location: Jewish Cemetery, Warsaw, Poland
- Designer: Jacek Eisner
- Dedicated to: Jewish children murdered in the Holocaust

The Memorial to the Children, the Victims of the Holocaust is a monument located in the Jewish cemetery on Okopowa Street in Warsaw, Poland, commemorating the children murdered in the Holocaust.

== Description ==
The monument was founded by Jacek Eisner. Its form refers to the high wall of the ghetto with barbed wire, to which plates, arranged in the shape of a menorah, lead. Ruins of the ghetto were placed at the bottom of the monument, on the surface of which are photographs of Jewish children who died during World War II. There is a plaque underneath with the following inscription in Polish, Hebrew and English: To the memory of one million Jewish children murdered by German barbarians 1939-1945. The photographs include a picture of a girl in checkered clothes and a hat; this depicts Lusia, the daughter of Chaskiel Bronstein, the owner of the Fotografika photography studio in Tarnów, mentioned by Paweł Huelle in the short story "Mercedes Benz".

The monument also contains: a symbolic grave of the Szteinman family, murdered during the Holocaust, and two commemorative plaques in Polish, Hebrew and English:

- The first reads: Grandmother Masha had twenty grandchildren. Grandmother Hana had eleven, only I survived. Jacek Eisner.
- The second contains the text of Mały Szmugler (The Little Smuggler), a poem by Henryka Łazowertówna.
