= Jan Lechoń =

Polish writer (1899–1956)

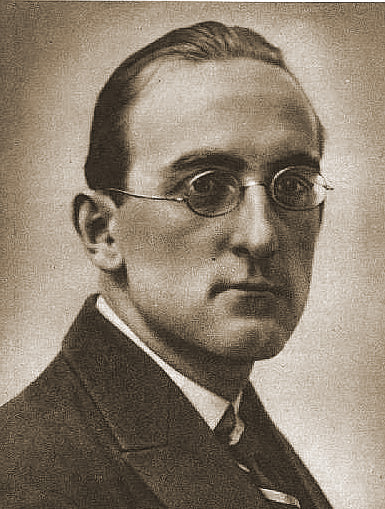
- Jan Lechoń
- Born: Leszek Józef Serafinowicz; 13 March 1899; Warsaw, Congress Poland
- Died: 8 June 1956 (aged 57); New York City, United States
- Resting place: Forest Cemetery in Laski
- Occupation: Poet
- Writing career
- Language: Polish
- Literary movement: Skamander

Leszek Józef Serafinowicz (pen name: Jan Lechoń; 13 March 1899 – 8 June 1956) was a Polish poet, literary and theater critic, diplomat, and co-founder of the Skamander literary movement and the Polish Institute of Arts and Sciences of America.

== Life ==
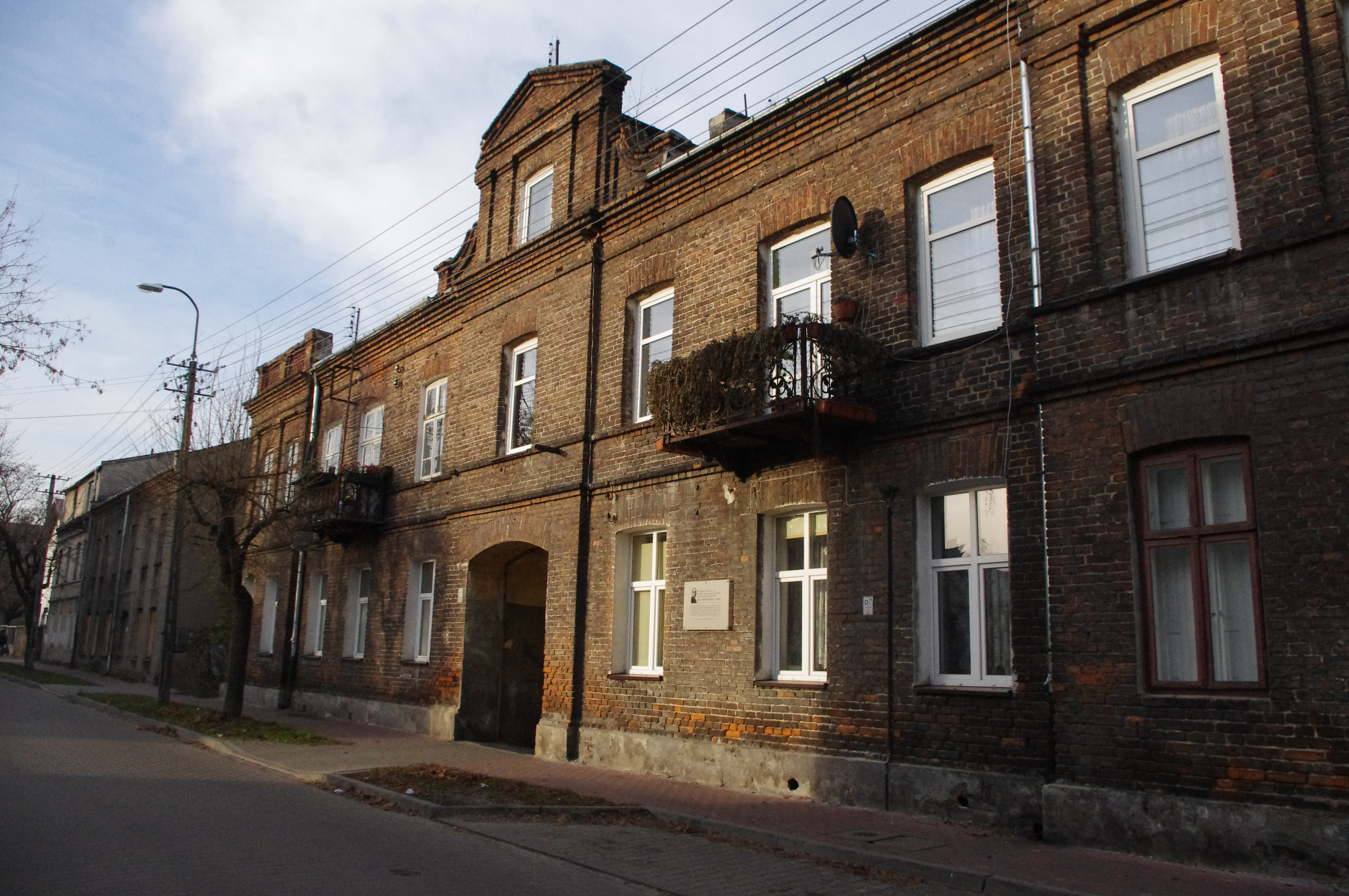
Jan Lechoń's house (1911–1912) in Pruszków

Lechoń studied the Polish language and literature at the University of Warsaw, by which point he had already authored two collections of poetry and a play. He was co-editor of Pro arte et studio magazine. Lechoń created the name Skamander for that literary group and delivered the opening speech at the group's first meeting on 6 December 1919. During the Polish–Soviet War (1919–21), he worked in the press office of Chief of State Józef Piłsudski.

Lechoń was a member of the Pikador literary cabaret, a member of the Polish Writers' Union, and secretary-general of the PEN Club. In 1926–29, he edited the satirical magazine Cyrulik Warszawski ('The Barber of Warsaw'—named in reference to The Barber of Seville). In 1925, he received an award from the Polish Book Publishers' Association, and in 1935 an award from the Polish Academy of Literature.

In 1921, he attempted suicide and spent some time in hospitals or sanatoriums trying to overcome depression. A troubled homosexual affair influenced Lechoń's decision to abandon Warsaw. From 1930 to 1939, he was a cultural attaché at the Polish embassy in Paris. After the fall of France to Nazi Germany, he left for Brazil and later settled in New York City. There, he co-edited many Polish newspapers and magazines; in 1942, he co-founded the Polish Institute of Arts and Sciences of America.

On the suggestion of a psychiatrist, Lechoń started writing a diary (1949–56). Amid recondite autobiographical reminiscences, the diary also documents Lechoń's attempts to come to terms with his homosexuality. "Oppressed by a sense of émigré obsolescence and poetic sterility, unable to resolve the conflict between his programmatically traditionalist Polish public persona and the anxieties of an aging, impecunious homosexual in an America beset by McCarthyism ...", Lechoń committed suicide on 8 June 1956 by jumping from the twelfth floor of the Hudson Hotel. At the time, his motive for doing so was given as depression deepened by "social degradation". The memoirs of Adam Ciołkosz point also to depression caused by the strengthening of the communist regime in Poland.

In 1991, Lechoń's remains were exhumed from Calvary Cemetery in Queens and transferred to a cemetery in Laski, to a family tomb shared with his parents, Władysław and Maria Serafinowicz.

== Work ==
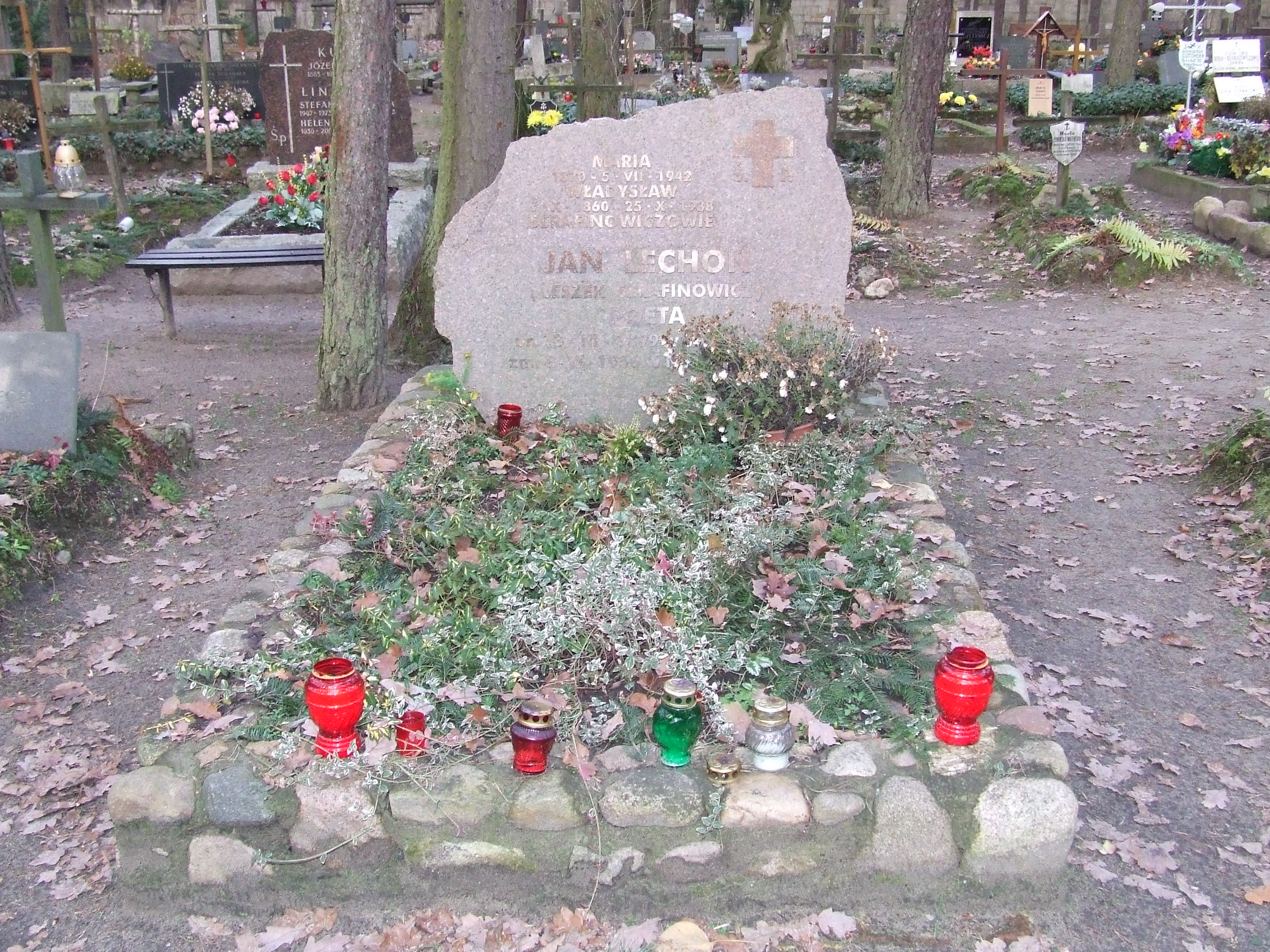
Grave of Lechoń in Laski

Lechoń made his literary debut at the age of 14 with poetry collections entitled Na złotym polu ('In a Golden Field', 1913) and Po różnych ścieżkach ('On Different Paths', 1914). In 1916, his drama W pałacu Stanisława Augusta ('At the Palace of Stanisław August') premiered at the Old Orangery in Warsaw. His poetry collection Srebrne i czarne ('Silver and Black') earned him an award from the Polish Book Publishers' Association. However, growing interest in Lechoń's work and his successes in the field of poetry had a negative influence on him. He found his status and fame overwhelming and did not publish further until the outbreak of World War II.

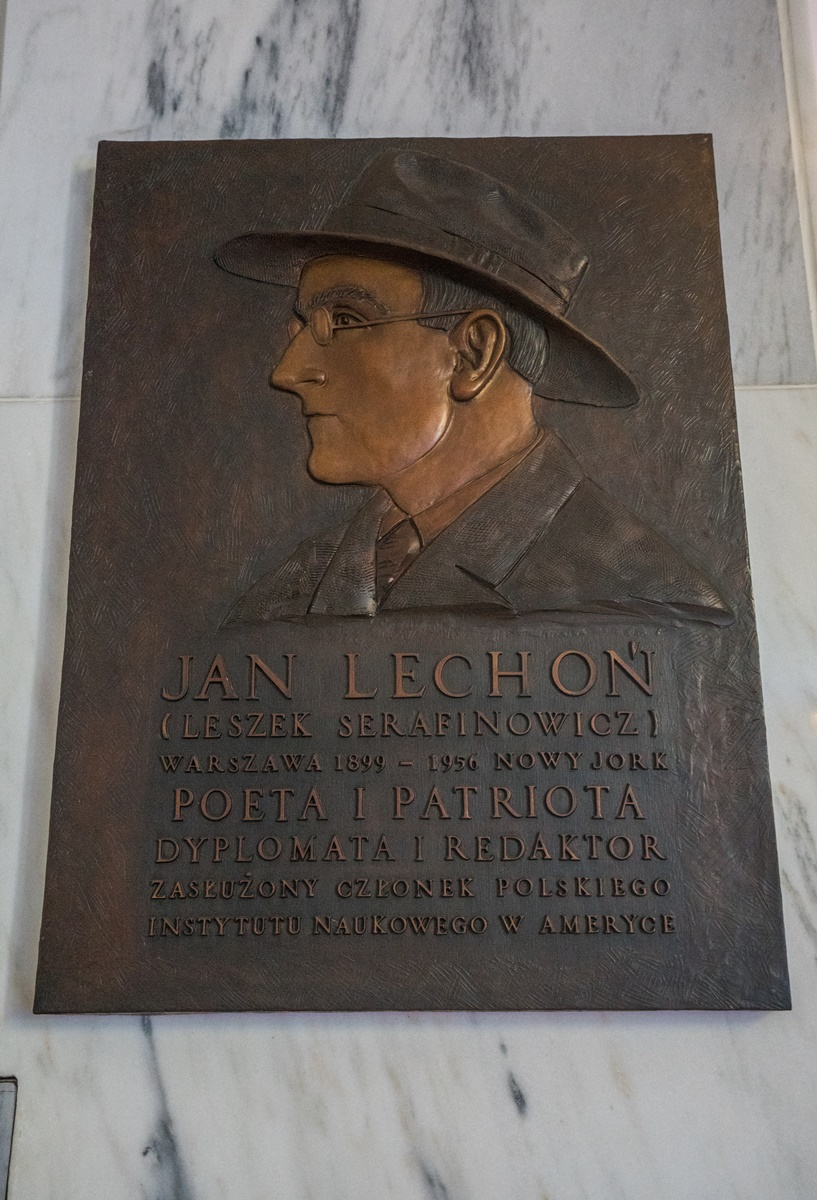
Jan Lechon plaque at Górny Kościół church

Poland's wartime demise awakened in him the passion to continue writing. He published Lutnia po Bekwarku in 1942 and Aria z kurantem in 1945, as well as Marmur i róża. His other works include Karmazynowy poemat and Iliada.

Lechoń's poetry, which combined romantic and classicist elements, was different from that of other members of the Skamander group. He also translated several dramas, wrote reviews and essays.

== From Lechoń's Diaries ==
"Mankind prospers in one of the falsest illusions, that the world is run by wise people. This would be impossible, if only because most of mankind are mediocrities, if not outright stupid people. If we speak with a physician, say about a writer, the physician is convinced that the writer is a good writer. We writers know that maybe 10 percent of writers are good, the rest being mediocrities and idiots. Likewise the writer supposes that a physician with whom he is unfamiliar is an accomplished expert in his line of work—whereas he is usually a mediocrity. It is amazing that, in spite of this, the world looks as it does."

== See also ==
- Polish poets
