= The Little Smuggler =

Poem by the Polish poet Henryka Łazowertówna

"The Little Smuggler" (Polish: Mały szmugler) is a famous poem by the Polish poet Henryka Łazowertówna (1909–1942). Written in the Warsaw Ghetto during the Holocaust, it tells the story of a small child who supports his starving family by — illegally, under Nazi dispensation — bringing over food supplies from the "Aryan side", thereby allowing for his family's survival while at the same time risking his own life. Indeed, the last stanza of the poem gives expression to the heroic child's fear — not of his own death but that of his mother who, in the event of the loss of her child, would be left without her daily sustenance.

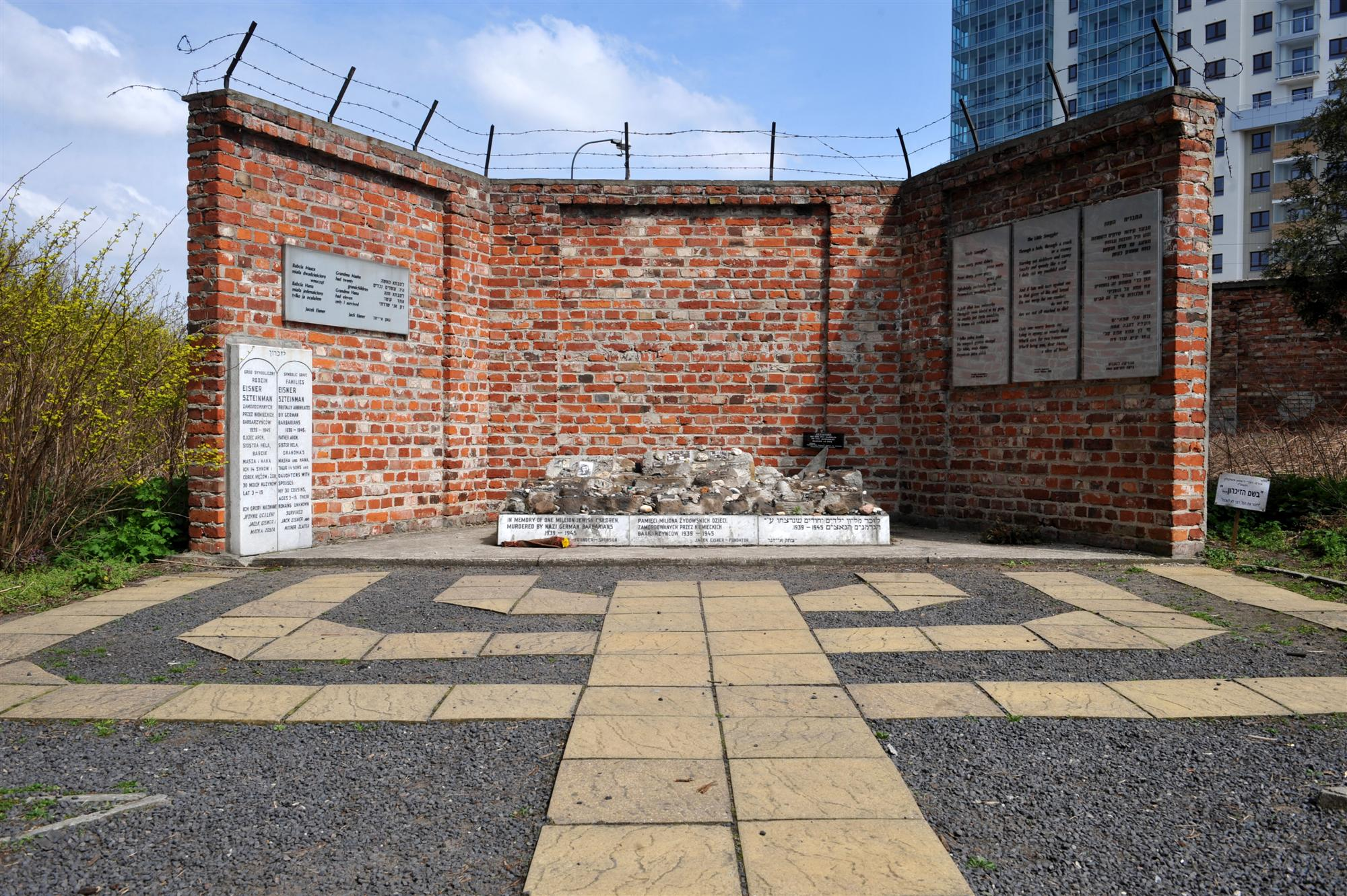
Memorial to the Child Victims of the Holocaust in Warsaw, with the text of the "Mały szmugler" inscribed on it in three languages

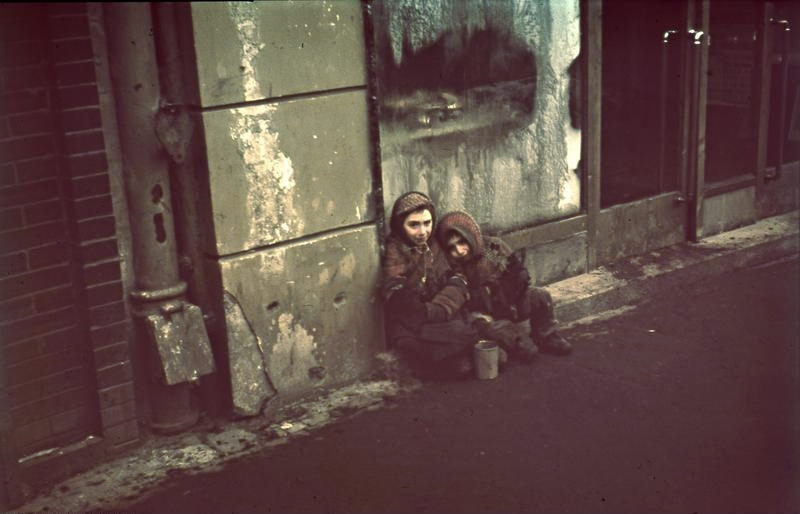
The children reduced to begging in the Warsaw Ghetto, 1940

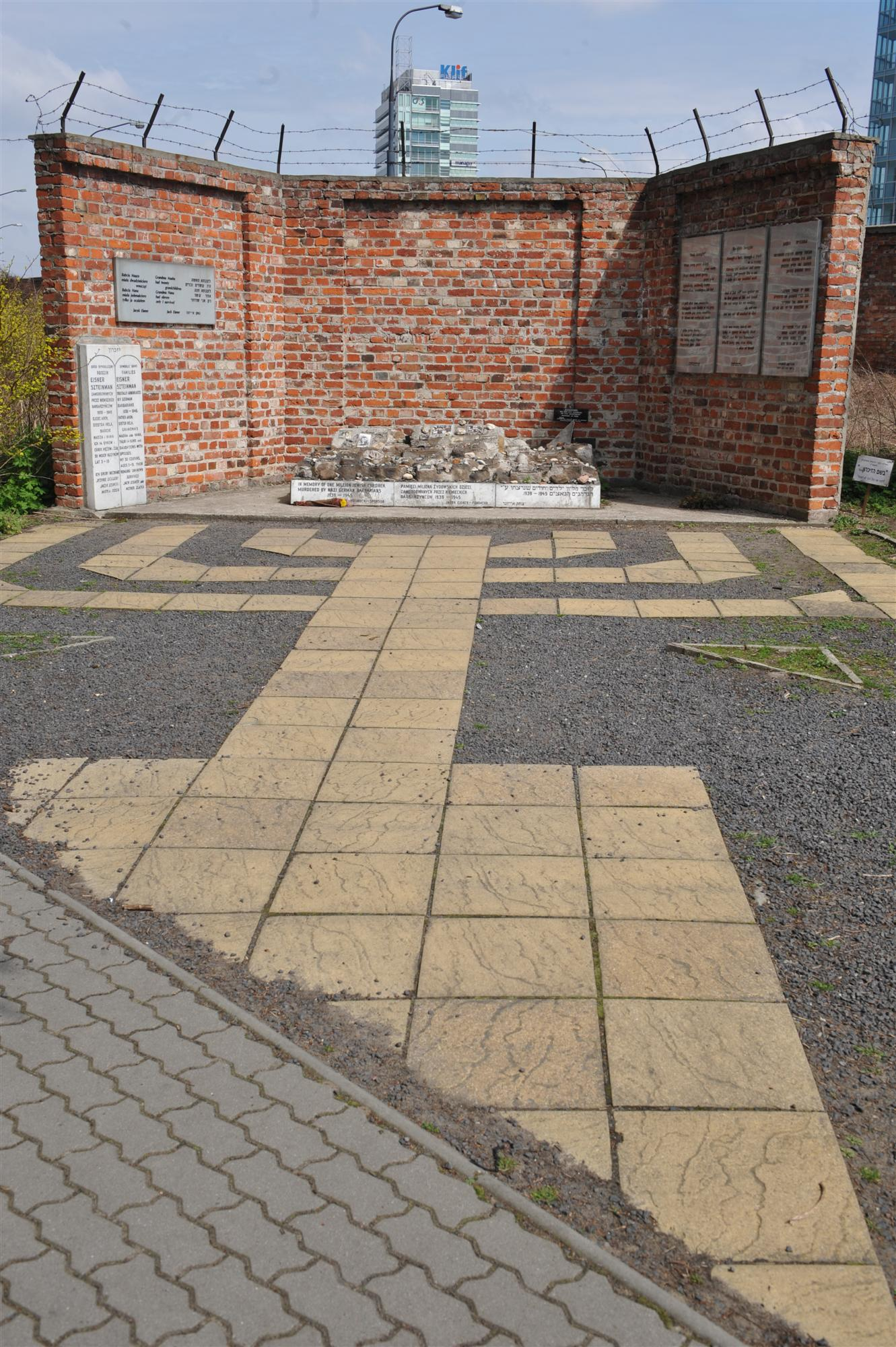
Memorial to the Child Victims of the Holocaust in Warsaw, with the text of the "Mały szmugler" inscribed on it in three languages

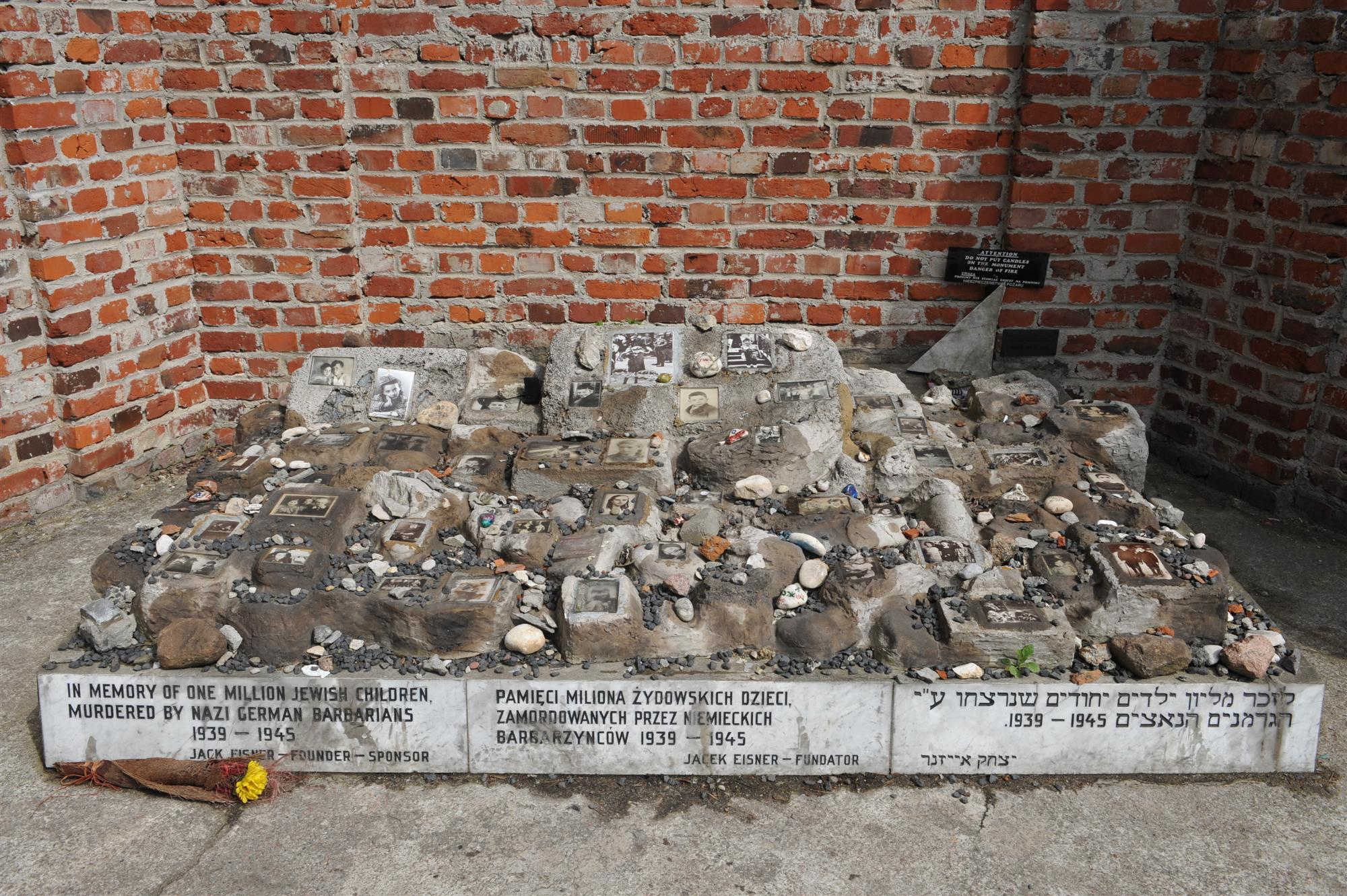
Memorial to the Child Victims of the Holocaust: a close-up

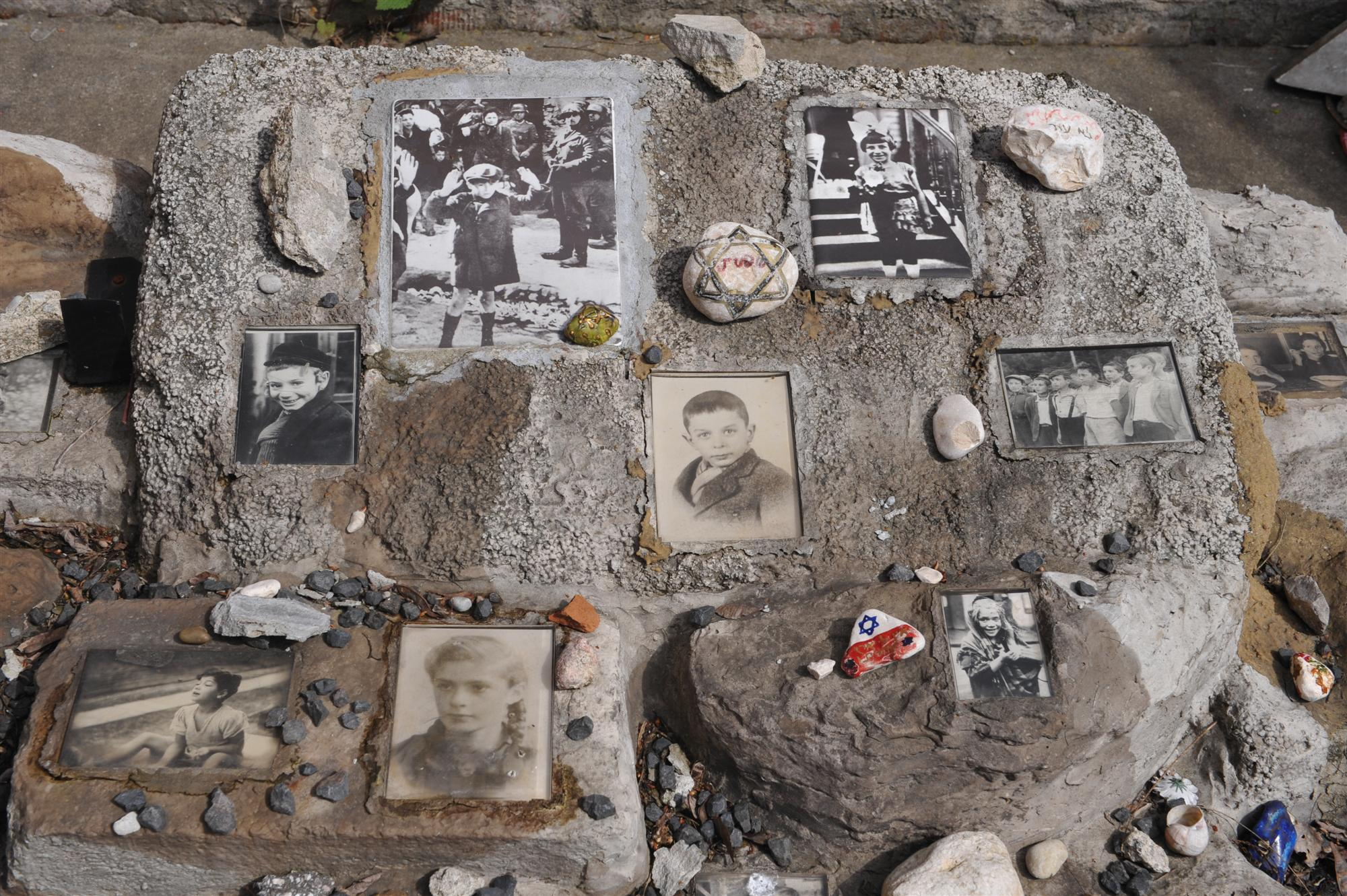
Memorial to the Child Victims of the Holocaust: a close-up

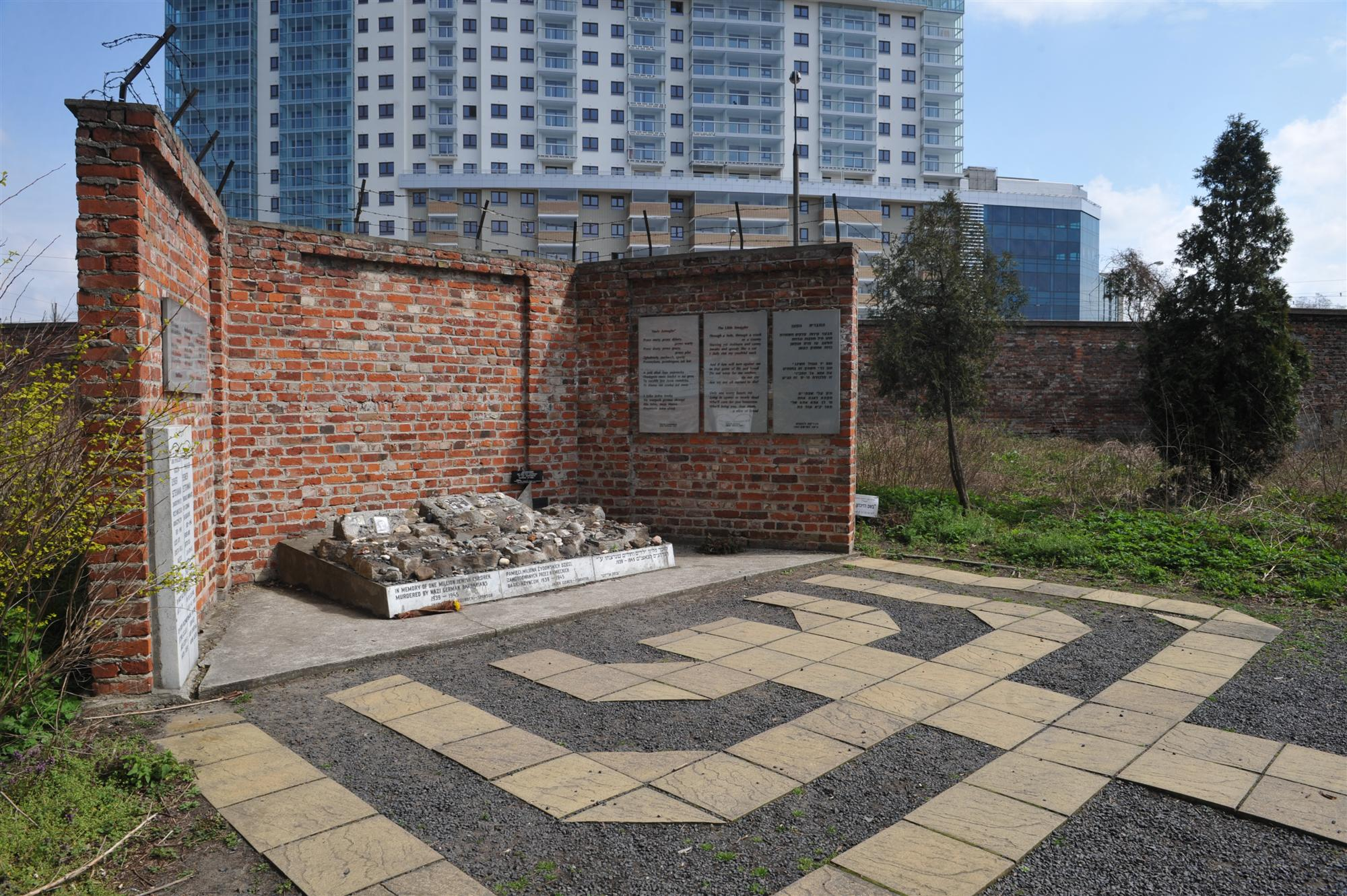
Memorial to the Child Victims of the Holocaust: a close-up

== Background and history of the poem ==
=== The Warsaw Ghetto ===
In 1941 the official daily food rations distributed on the basis of ration cards were allocated by the Nazis according to the following ethnically differentiated scale: the Germans were allotted 2,613 calories per day, the Poles, 669, while persons of Jewish origin were allowed only 184 calories a day, a diet insufficient for survival. Consequently, in the Warsaw Ghetto fully eighty percent of all food consumed had to be smuggled in as illicit contraband. Only those with access to smuggled food, and the very rich able to afford to buy provisions on the black market within the Ghetto at exorbitant prices, stood a chance of survival. For most, children were the best hope for bringing supplies over from the "Aryan side" as they could slither undetected through small openings and sewer lines on their way to and from the Ghetto. These child heroes, as noted by the historian Richard C. Lukas, saved or prolonged the lives of countless adult individuals. But they themselves fell victim in large numbers to the bullets of German police.

Already during the Holocaust the poem "Mały szmugler" enjoyed a sufficient degree of fame and popularity to be translated from the Polish into Yiddish and, set to music, performed to great acclaim by Diana Blumenfeld. The poem — as recited by Łazowertówna herself in August 1941 — moved the hearts of her contemporary listeners so deeply that Emanuel Ringelblum is able to report the voices of those who insisted that, once the Ghetto becomes liberated after the War, it should host a monument dedicated to the Unknown Smuggler depicted in the poem.

However, the Warsaw Ghetto was never liberated; it was "liquidated" by the Nazis in various stages over several months beginning in July 1942, with the result of the hundreds of thousands of residents who had not previously died of starvation or disease — men, women, and children — having been methodically murdered in organized genocide, while the actual municipal structure of the whole precinct was razed to the ground. The author of the poem, Henryka Łazowertówna, together with her mother, Bluma Łazowertowa, were themselves killed in the gas chambers of the Treblinka extermination camp.

=== Composition ===
As has been pointed out by literary scholars, the character of the Little Smuggler in Łazowertówna's poem is idealized. The subject has also been treated in the writings of Bogdan Wojdowski (1930–1994).

=== The present day ===
A three-stanza excerpt from the original text of the poem, together with translations in English and in Hebrew, is today inscribed on the Memorial to the Child Victims of the Holocaust (pictured to the right; see also Pomnik Pamięci Dzieci) in Warsaw — serving as the epitaph for the million children murdered in the Holocaust. As Jenny Robertson puts it, thousands of people visit the Memorial each year and read the extract of the famous work carved there, which, like other of Łazowertówna's works, spoke directly to the hearts of her audience during the existence of the Warsaw Ghetto.

=== First publication ===
The poem, composed at an unknown date c. 1941, received its first publication in an anthology of poems about Jewish experience under Nazi occupation compiled by the Polish poet Michał Maksymilian Borwicz (1911–1987), which appeared two years after the end of the War, in 1947, under the title Pieśń ujdzie cało... ("The Song will Survive Intact..."; see Bibliography). Borwicz was at the time the head of the Kraków-based Centralna Żydowska Komisja Historyczna (Central Jewish Historical Commission), under whose auspices he published the book. In the same year (the year of the final Communist takeover in Poland) he emigrated to France and spent the rest of his life in Paris.

== Text and translation ==
Przez mury, przez dziury, przez warty
Przez druty, przez gruzy, przez płot
Zgłodniały, zuchwały, uparty
Przemykam, przebiegam jak kot.

W południe, po nocy, o świcie
W zawieje, szarugę i skwar
Po stokroć narażam swe życie
Nadstawiam dziecinny swój kark.

Pod pachą zgrzebny worek
Na plecach zdarty łach
I młode zwinne nogi
A w sercu wieczny strach.

Lecz wszystko trzeba ścierpieć
I wszystko trzeba znieść
By Państwo mogli jutro
Do syta chleba mieć.

Przez mury, przez dziury, przez cegły
Po nocy, o świcie i w dzień
Zuchwały, zgłodniały, przebiegły
Przesuwam się cicho jak cień.

A jeśli dłoń losu znienacka
Dosięgnie mnie kiedyś w tej grze,
To zwykła jest życia zasadzka,
Ty, Mamo, nie czekaj już mnie.
Nie wrócę już do Ciebie
Nie dotrze z dala głos
Uliczny pył pogrzebie
Stracony dziecka los.

I tylko jedną prośbą
Na wargach grymas skrzepł
Kto tobie, moja Mamo
Przyniesie jutro chleb.

Through walls, through holes, through sentry points,
Through wires, through rubble, through fences:
Hungry, daring, stubborn
I flee, dart like a cat.

At noon, at night, in dawning hours,
In blizzards, in the heat,
A hundred times I risk my life,
I risk my childish neck.

Under my arm a burlap sack,
On my back a tattered rag;
Running on my swift young legs
With fear ever in my heart.

Yet everything must be suffered;
And all must be endured,
So that tomorrow you can all
Eat your fill of bread.

Through walls, though holes, through brickwork,
At night, at dawn, at day,
Hungry, daring, cunning,
Quiet as a shadow I move.

And if the hand of sudden fate
Seizes me at some point in this game,
It's only the common snare of life.
Mama, don't wait for me.
I won't return to you,
Your far-off voice won't reach.
The dust of the street will bury
The lost youngster's fate.

And only one grim thought,
A grimace on your lips:
Who, my dear Mama, who
Will bring you bread tomorrow?

—Translated by Patricia Heberer,
from Children during the Holocaust

Another translation of the first and the third stanzas, less literal and more adaptive than the above but better capturing the rhythm of the original, is provided in a book by Richard C. Lukas and reads as follows.

Past rubble, fence, barbed wire
Past soldiers guarding the Wall,
Starving but still defiant,
I softly steal past them all.

Clutching a bag of sacking,
With only rags to wear,
With limbs numbed by winter,
And hearts numbed by despair.

=== Title of the poem in English translation ===
The original title of the poem, "Mały szmugler", translates literally as "The Little Smuggler", with all the meanings and connotations of the adjective "little" reflected almost exactly in the original Polish term mały. In one English-language source the title is rendered "To the Child Smuggler", but this introduces a degree of semantic precision, derived retroactively from the main body of the text of the poem, which the original Polish title itself lacks. The addition of the preposition "To", transitive and dedicatory in impact, moreover, belies the fact that the poem is written in the first person as a (would-be) record of personal, intransitive experience of the author.

== See also ==
- Henryka Łazowertówna
- Warsaw Ghetto
- Holocaust
