= Antoni Słonimski =

Polish writer and journalist (1895–1976)

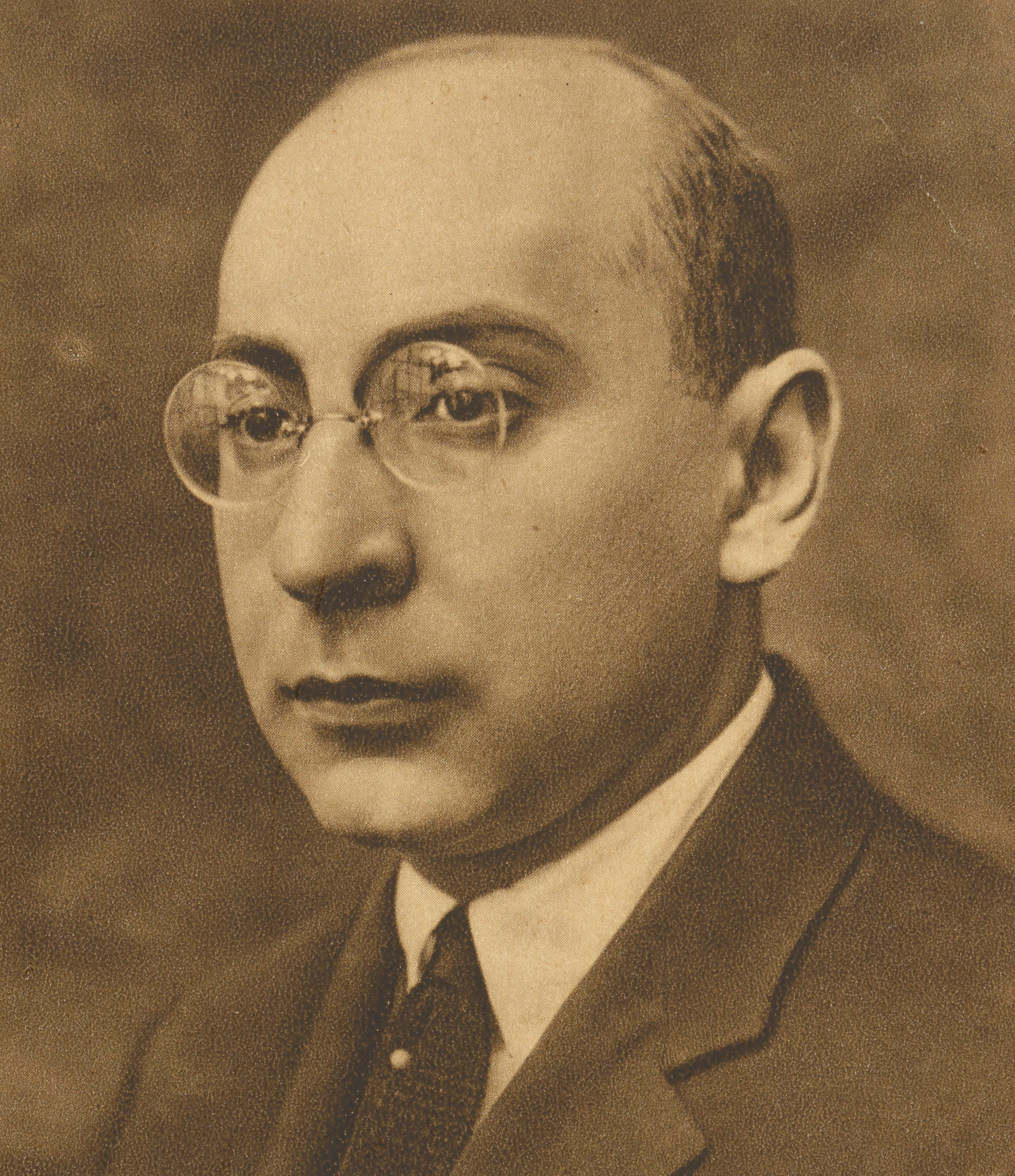
- Antoni Słonimski
- Born: Antoni Słonimski; 15 November 1895; Warsaw, Congress Poland, Russian Empire
- Died: 4 July 1976 (aged 80); Warsaw, Poland
- Resting place: Forest Cemetery in Laski
- Occupation: Writer
- Writing career
- Language: Polish
- Literary movement: Skamander

Antoni Słonimski (15 November 1895 – 4 July 1976) was a Polish poet, artist, journalist, playwright and prose writer, president of the Union of Polish Writers in 1956–1959 during the Polish October, known for his devotion to social justice.

Słonimski was the grandson of Hayyim Selig Slonimski, the founder of "ha-Tsefirah"- the first Hebrew weekly with an emphasis on the sciences. His father, an ophthalmologist, converted to Christianity when he married a Catholic woman. Słonimski was born in Warsaw and baptized and raised as a Christian. Słonimski studied at the Academy of Fine Arts in Warsaw. In 1919 he co-founded the Skamander group of experimental poets with Julian Tuwim and Jarosław Iwaszkiewicz. In 1924 he travelled to Palestine and Brasil and in 1932 to the Soviet Union.

Słonimski spent the war years in exile in England and France, returning to Poland in 1951. He worked as contributor to popular periodicals: Nowa Kultura (1950–1962), Szpilki (1953–73) and Przegląd Kulturalny. He was an active anti-Stalinist and supporter of liberalization. In 1964 he was one of the signatories and the main author of the so-called Letter of 34 to Prime Minister Józef Cyrankiewicz regarding freedom of culture. Słonimski died on 4 July 1976 in a car accident in Warsaw.

== Works ==
- Sonety (1918)
- Parada (1920)
- Godzina poezji (1923)
- Torpeda czasu (Time Torpedo, 1926), a science fiction novel influenced by H. G. Wells
- Droga na wschód (Road to the East; 1924), a collection of poems inspired by his travels to Palestine and Brazil
- Z dalekiej podróży (1926)
- Rodzina (Family; 1933), a comedy about two brothers: a communist, and a fascist
- Okno bez krat (1935)
- Dwa końce świata (Two Ends of the World; 1937), a novel predicting Warsaw's destruction by a Nazi dictator
- Alarm (1940)
- Wiek klęski (1945)
- Nowe wiersze (1959)
- Wiersze 1958–1963 (1963)
- 138 wierszy (1973)

Science Fiction

- Torpeda czasu (1924) Warszawa: Towarzystwo Wydawnicze "Ignis" (E. Wende i S-ka); drukowana odcinkach w drugiej połowie 1923 roku na łamach Kuriera Polskiego (nr 281–352), powojenne wydanie Warszawa: Czytelnik, 1967 (z przedmową Stanisława Lema)
- Dwa końce świata (1937) Warszawa: J. Przeworski, powojenne wydanie Warszawa: Książka i Wiedza, 1991

== Awards and decorations ==
- Commander's Cross of Order of Polonia Restituta (16 July 1954)
- Officer's Cross of Order of Polonia Restituta (22 July 1952)
- Medal of the 10th Anniversary of People's Poland (19 January 1955)

== See also ==
- Polish literature

== Sources ==
- Barry Keane, Skamander. The Poets and Their Poetry (2004), Agade; Warsaw, ISBN 83-87111-29-5.

== Sources ==
- "Antoni Slonimski." Encyclopædia Britannica Online
