= Skamander =

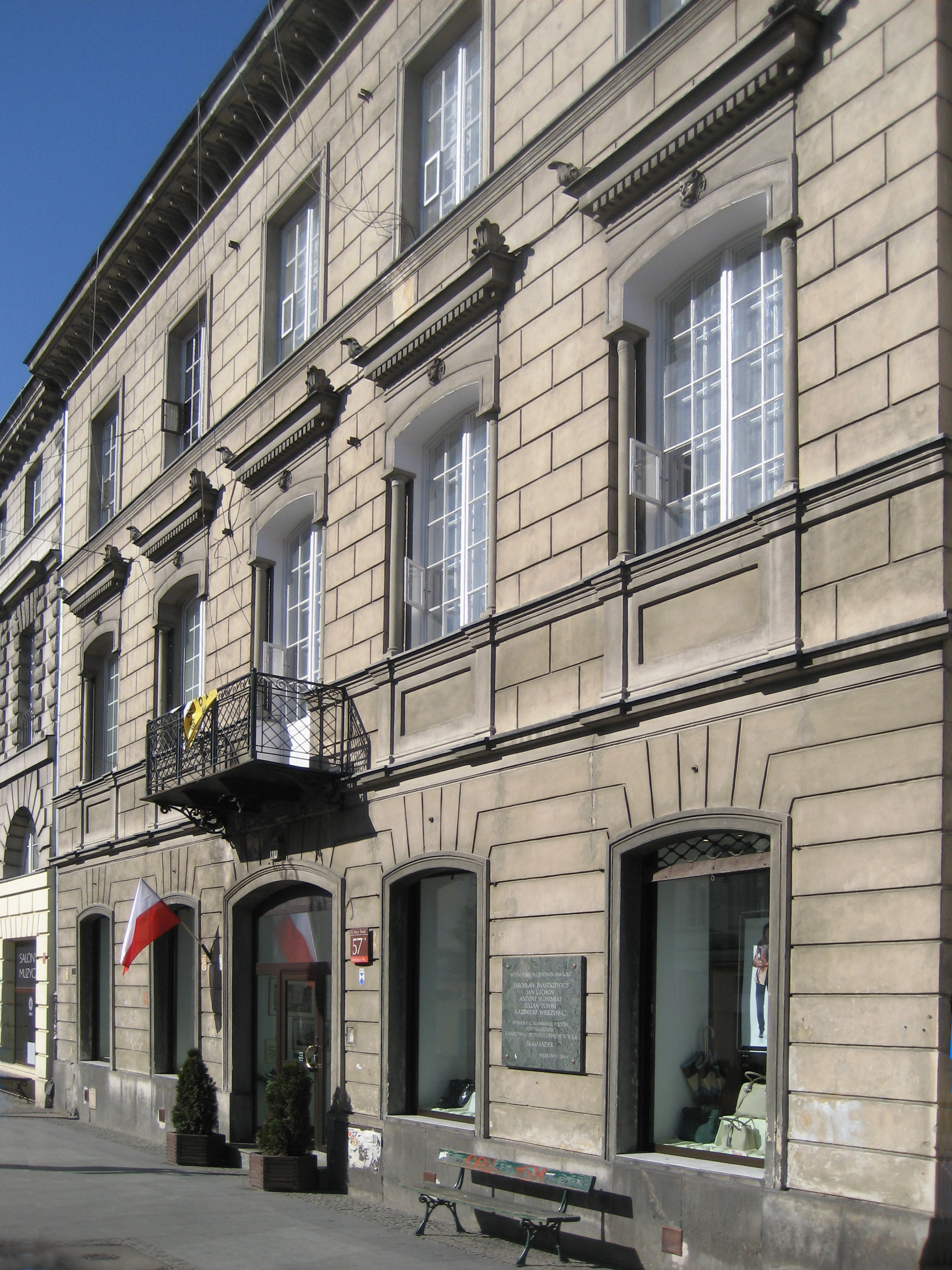
Nowy Świat 57, Warsaw, birthplace of Skamander. Here, on 29 November 1918, five poets opened the Picador Café.

Skamander was a Polish group of experimental poets founded in 1918 by Julian Tuwim, Antoni Słonimski, Jarosław Iwaszkiewicz, Kazimierz Wierzyński and Jan Lechoń. Initially unnamed, in December 1919 it adopted the name Skamander, after the Scamander River in Asia Minor. It gave its name to the monthly review it published from 1920.

== History ==
The group was initially closely related to the Pro Arte et Studio literary monthly and the Pod Picadorem (Picador) Café in Warsaw. In 1920 it created its own publication, the Skamander monthly, though its members also collaborated with Wiadomości Literackie (Literary News) and other newspapers.

The young poets were heavily influenced by Leopold Staff and other neoromantic poets. Their main aims were to break the links between history and poetry and to end the nationalist and patriotic functions of Polish poetry. They also emphasized the need to restore poetry to the common people by returning to everyday-language usage in poetry, including colloquialisms, neologisms and vulgarisms. Finally, the Skamandrites (Skamandryci) emphasized the beauty of everyday life and of all forms of life generally, including the biological side.

In contrast to the basic aims of the late-19th-century Young Poland movement, Skamander's members eschewed semi-mythological heroes and protagonists, replacing them with common people. In contrast to the contemporary Awangarda Krakowska (Kraków Avant-Garde) movement, they saw themselves as continuers of Polish literary traditions, especially those of romanticism and neoromanticism.

Apart from the movement's five chief members, several lesser-known poets and critics adhered to its principles. They included Kazimiera Iłłakowiczówna, Stanisław Baliński, Gabriel Michał Karski, Światopełk Karpiński, Jerzy Paczkowski, Karol Zawodziński and Wilam Horzyca.

== See also ==
- Polish literature
