= Karol Wiktor Zawodziński =

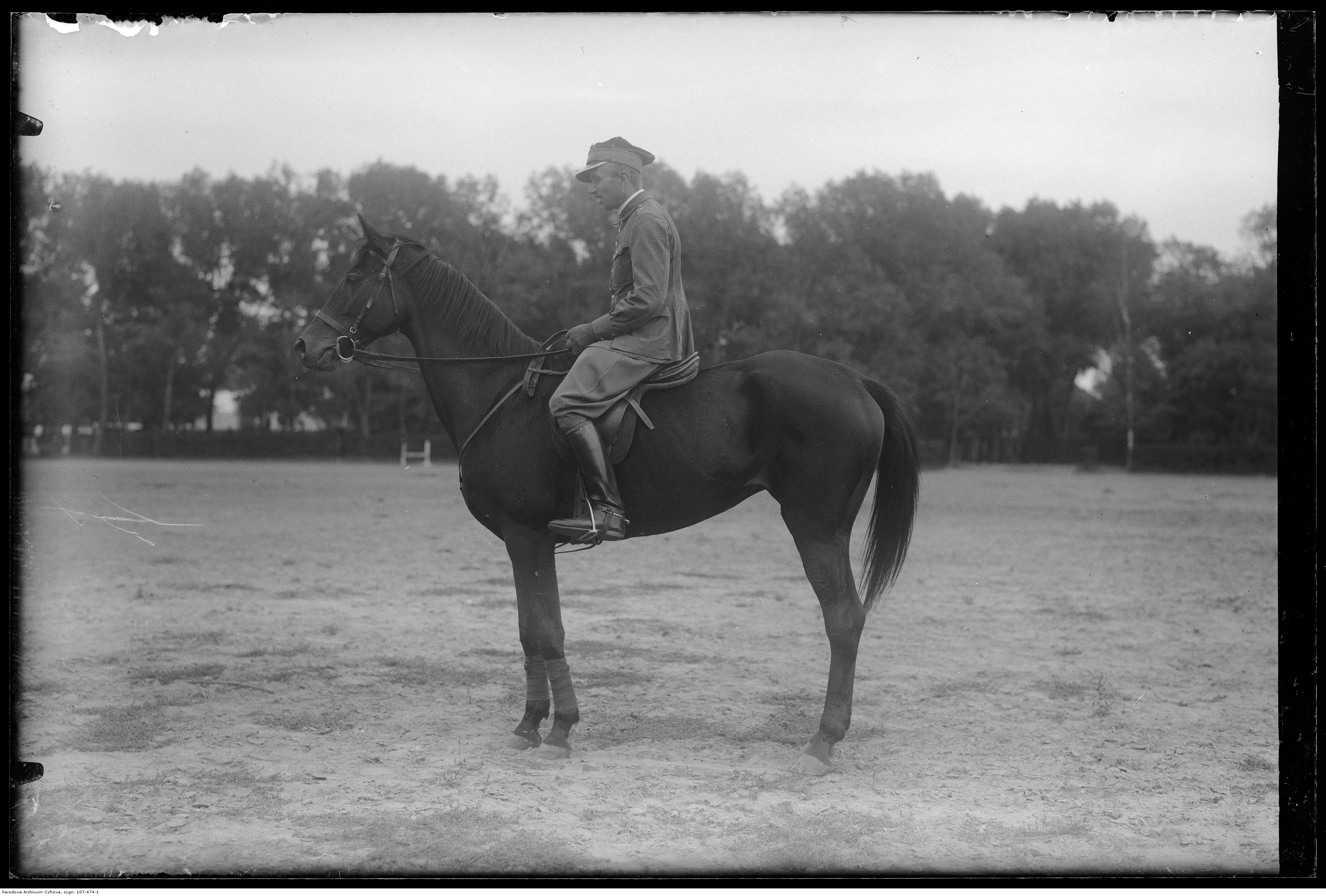
- Born: 1 June 1890; Warsaw, Vistula Land
- Died: 14 December 1949 (aged 59); Toruń, Polish People's Republic
- Education: Saint Petersburg State University
- Occupations: Literary critic Theoretist; Historian of literature
- Writing career
- Pen name: Karol de Johne
- Language: Polish
- Genre: Poetry

Karol Wiktor Zawodziński, also known by his pseudonym Karol de Johne, (1 June 1890 – 14 December 1949) was a Polish literary critic, theoretist and historian of literature. He was associated with the group Skamander.

== Biography ==
Zawodziński was born on 1 June 1890 in Warsaw. In the years of 1908–1913 he studied Latin philology at the university of Saint Petersburg. In 1914 he joined the Polish Legions and during the years of 1918–1932 was an officer in the Polish Army.

In 1921 he made his own debut as a literary critic in Przegląd Warszawski, where he also published his own poetry works, later collected in Descour under pseudonym Karol de Johne. Zawodziński was awarded Golden Laurel of the Polish Academy of Literature (Polish: Złoty Wawrzyn Polskiej Akademii Literatury). In 1946 he became a professor of the Nicolaus Copernicus University in Toruń.

He died on 14 December 1949 in Toruń.

== Notable works ==
- Maria Dąbrowska. Historyczno-literackie znaczenie jej twórczości (1933)
- Zarys wersyfikacji polskiej (Outline of Polish versification), vol. 1–2 (1936–1954)
- Blaski i nędze realizmu powieściowego w latach ostatnich (1937)
- Liryka polska w dobie jej kryzysu (1939)
- Stulecie trójcy powieściopisarzy (1947)

Works published posthumously

- Studia z wersyfikacji polskiej (1954)
- Opowieści o powieści (1963)
- Wśród poetów (1964)
