= Polish culture in the Interbellum =

Polish culture in the interwar period witnessed the rebirth of Polish sovereignty. The nationhood along with its cultural heritage was no longer suppressed by the three foreign partitioners. The cultural development saw the retreat of the 19th century elite cultures of nobility as well as the traditional folk culture, and the rise of a new mass culture integrating Polish society closer to the new intelligentsia educated in the practice of democracy.

== Background ==
Aside from the economic paralysis caused by the century of partitions, one of the most severe consequences of foreign rule was illiteracy, affecting 33.1% of Poland's citizens in 1921, with the worst situation existing in the former Russian Empire. The territories of the Prussian Partition were most developed, although Poles were also subjected to the Germanization policies of Kulturkampf and Hakata. Meanwhile, the eastern and southern territories – parts of the former Russian Partition and Austrian Partition – were among the least developed regions in Europe. Even though the level of economic, cultural and political development between the three former zones of occupation differed substantially, over time, the cultural hubs of Warsaw, Kraków, Wilno (modern Vilnius) and Lwów (modern Lviv) raised themselves to the level of vital European cities.

== Highlights ==
While the term Polish culture refers primarily to the Polish-language culture in Poland, the Second Polish Republic also had numerous vibrant national minorities, most notably Jewish, Ukrainian, Belarusian, Lithuanian and German. It was a multicultural society whose ethno-cultural makeup was shaped over a period of centuries. In 1921 according to the first-ever national census, the Catholic Poles constituted 69.2% of the population, the Ukrainians 14.3%, the Jews 7.8%, the Belarusians 3.9% and the Germans 3.9%. The minorities amounted to 30.8% of the total. The rise of new intelligentsia resulted in the development of a record number of political parties, lobbies and societies. In a dozen or so years the newspaper readership doubled. In 1919, new universities opened in Poznań, Wilno, and Lublin. Universities in Kraków and Lwów were polonized already five years earlier. The Elementary School Teachers Union was formed in 1919. In the first ten years of Poland's redevelopment, the total number of schools increased by almost 10,000 thanks to the official decree on public education. By the time of the Nazi-Soviet invasion of 1939, some 90% of children were in schools across the country, the number limited only by the shortage of qualified staff and lack of adequate locales especially in the villages.

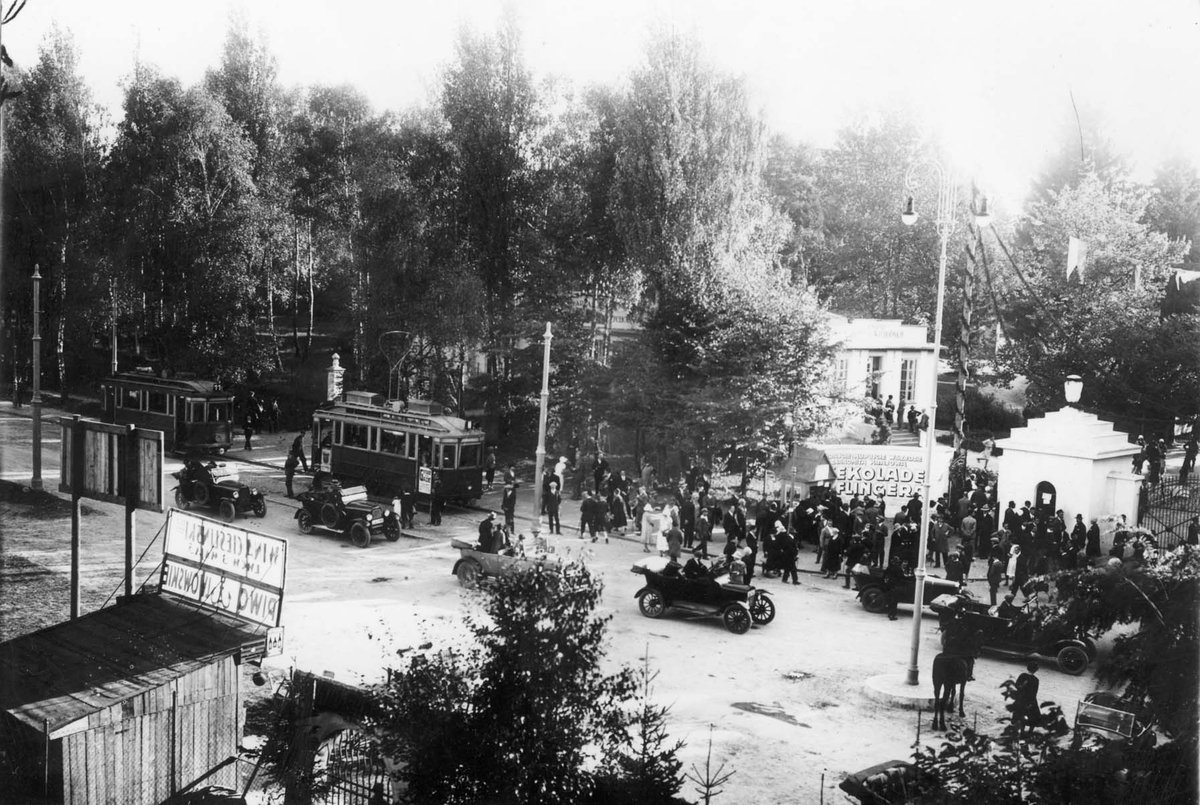
Eastern Trade Fair (Targi Wschodnie), main entrance; Lwów (now Lviv, Ukraine)

In 1921 a major trade fair was established in Lwów right after the end of hostilities there; designed to facilitate new business partnerships from within Poland but also from Greater Romania, Hungary and the Soviet Union among other places. The annual Eastern Trade Fair or the Targi Wschodnie (as it was known in Polish) by 1928 could boast some 1,600 exhibitors, 400 of them being foreign firms. The fair attracted 150,000 visitors that year, with tram connections to the city, customs office and telephone exchange on site. Also in 1928, a similar trade fair was launched in Wilno (now Vilnius, Lithuania) to drum up business in northeastern Poland, reaching out to Lithuania and Latvia. The Northern Trade Fair (Targi Północne) was visited by the staggering 180,000 guests in the first year. It was the biggest annual event locally showcasting textiles, furniture, farm animals, furs, tourist equipment, production machinery and many other commercial products.

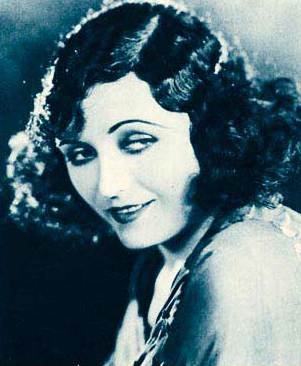
Pola Negri, 1924

New theatres opened in Bydgoszcz (1919), Katowice (1922) and Toruń (1929). In Warsaw, the new Teatr Polski performed since 1913 already, and in 1924 the Teatr Narodowy opened, followed by the Teatr Bogusławskiego (1926, rebuilt) and the Ateneum (1928). There were also several vibrant theatre companies in Kraków and Lwów. By 1936 there were 26 permanent dramatic theatres in the country. The Kraków Philharmonic Concert Hall inspired by the Brussels' Maison du Peuple, was completed in 1931 thanks to the generous sponsorship by Prince and Cardinal Adam Stefan Sapieha. Throughout the interwar period, the Kraków Philharmonic maintained also the Polish Professional Musicians Trade Union set up to protect the welfare of its members as well as the artistic level of their performances.

Music conservatories were established in Warszaw, Poznań, Katowice, Kraków, Łódź and Wilno. In 1934 the main branch of Poland's National Museum was erected in Kraków with holdings reaching 300,000 items. The film industry received major boost around 1934 when a generation of new actors joined in including Stefan Jaracz, Mieczysława Ćwiklińska, Elżbieta Barszczewska, Kazimierz Junosza-Stępowski and Adolf Dymsza. The period saw the introduction of the studio system of filmmaking with Sfinks of Warsaw, founded by Aleksander Hertz, becoming the biggest film production company locally. The studio discovered the then 17-year-old Pola Negri and made eight feature films with her, before Negri became an international sensation based in Hollywood. In 1926 the Polish Radio began its regular broadcasts from Warsaw. The number of publicly owned stations increased to 10 prior to the 1939 invasion.

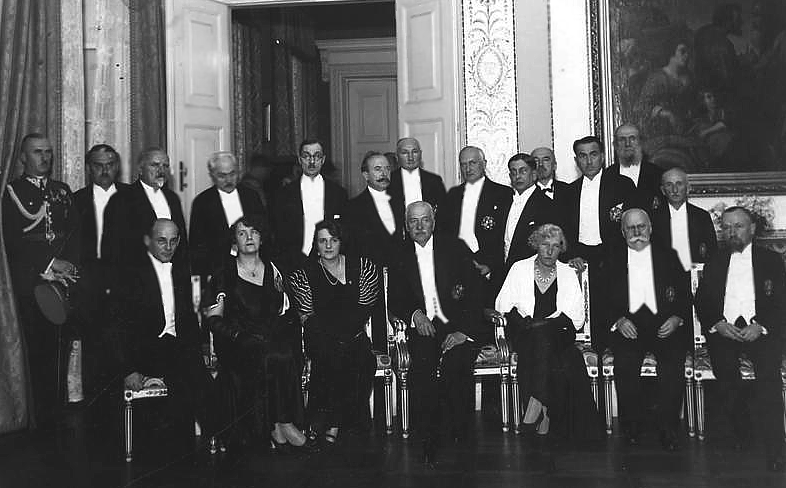
The inaugural session of the Polish Academy of Literature, 1933. Sitting from left to right: Prime Minister Janusz Jędrzejewicz, Zofia Nałkowska, Maria Mościcka, President Ignacy Mościcki, Maria Jędrzejewicz, Wacław Sieroszewski, Leopold Staff. Standing from left: Colonel Jan Głogowski, director Skowroński, Zenon Przesmycki, Wacław Berent, Piotr Choynowski, Juliusz Kleiner, Wincenty Rzymowski, Jerzy Szaniawski, Juliusz Kaden-Bandrowski, Karol Irzykowski, Tadeusz Żeleński, Tadeusz Zieliński, and Bolesław Leśmian

In 1933, the Polish Academy of Literature (PAL) was founded in Warsaw. It was one of the most important state institutions of literary life focused on the advancement of culture and art. It was proposed by Stefan Żeromski in order to speed up the process of recovery from the century of racial anti-Polonism, and implemented on the fifth anniversary of his death. The Academy awarded two highest national honors for contribution to the development of Polish literature: the Gold and the Silver Laurel (Złoty, and Srebrny Wawrzyn). The main objective was to raise the quality level of Poland's book publishing. The honorary members included the Academy's main promoters: President of Poland Ignacy Mościcki and Marshal Józef Piłsudski.

== Cultural contributions of the minorities ==
The spirit of rebirth affected not only Poland's mainstream society, but also national, ethnic, and religious minorities. By the late 1930s, the Ukrainian press could boast some 68 titles published mainly in Lwów, Stanisławów and Kołomyja. The most important, was the Lwów daily Dilo (The Deed) with strong cultural and liberal background. It was published on a weekly basis already since 1880, but in the interwar Poland it had expanded to 10 pages per day (16 pages on Saturday) with 10 full-time workers. Other popular dailies included Nowyi czas and the Ukrainian Visti. The Belarusian press consisted of 16 periodicals; and the Lithuanian as well as Russian press published around 10 titles each. At Warsaw University the seminars on Ukrainian history were held by renowned scholar, prof. Myron Korduba who taught Jerzy Giedroyc among others. However, the Ukrainian attempts at forming a Ukrainian-language-only university did not succeed, attesting to the lack of perspective on the part of various political entities, before the Nazi-Soviet invasion. The plentiful collection of German press included notable anti-Fascist daily Neue Lodzer Zeitung.

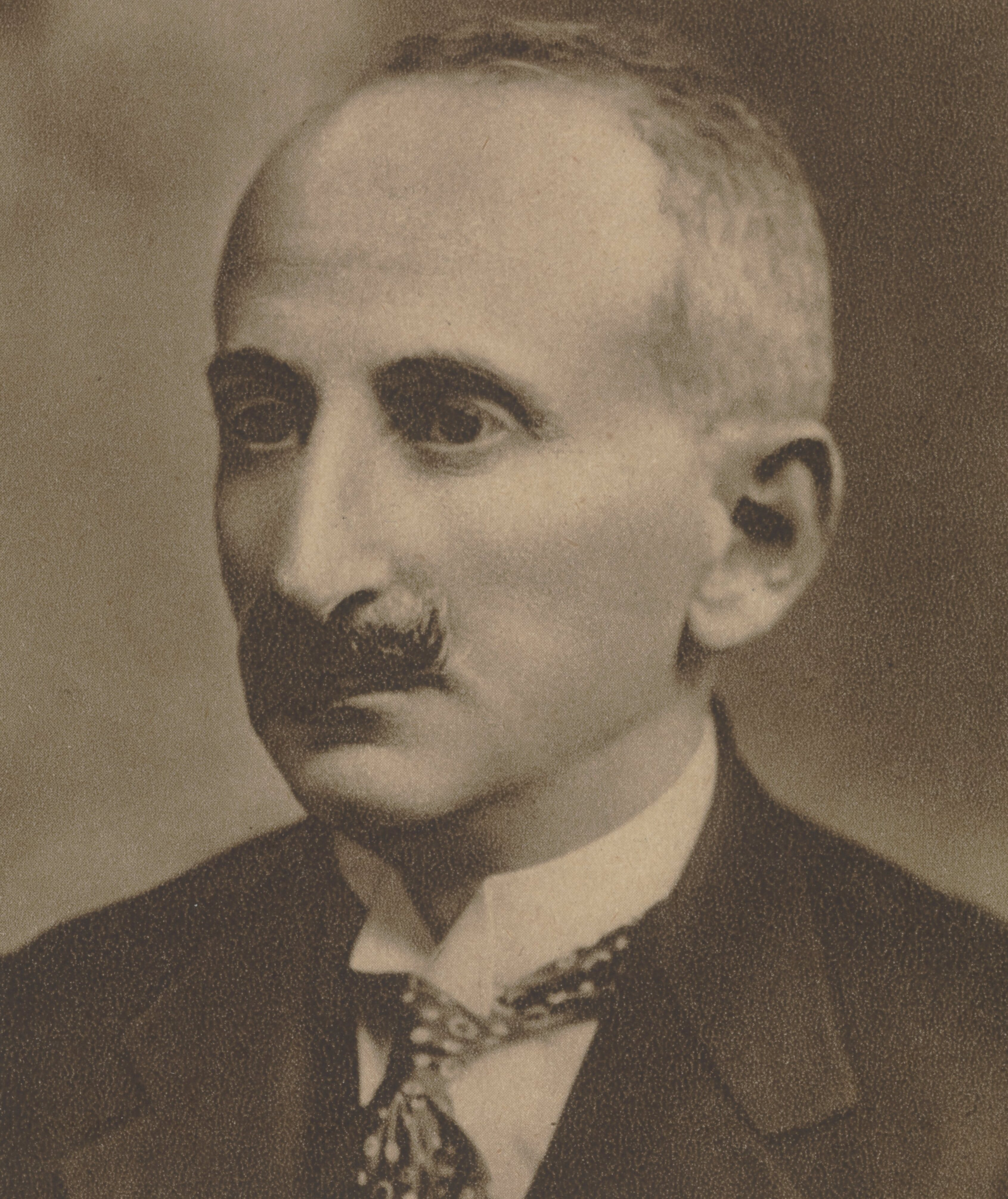
Bolesław Leśmian

The Jewish cultural scene was particularly vibrant, with numerous Jewish publications and over 116 periodicals. Yiddish authors, most notably Isaac Bashevis Singer, went on to achieve international acclaim. Other renowned Jewish authors included Bruno Schulz, Julian Tuwim, Marian Hemar, Emanuel Schlechter, Jan Brzechwa, Zuzanna Ginczanka and Bolesław Leśmian. Konrad Tom and Jerzy Jurandot were less well known internationally, but made important contributions to Polish literature. Singer Jan Kiepura was one of the most famous artists of that era, and so were the Jewish composers of popular music like Henryk Wars, Jerzy Petersburski, Artur Gold, Henryk Gold, Zygmunt Białostocki or Jazzmen célèbres Szymon Kataszek and Jakub Kagan. Among the painters known for their depictions of Jewish life in Poland, were Leopold (Leib) Pilichowski trained by Samuel Hirszenberg, Artur Markowicz, award-winning master-painter Maurycy Trębacz, Izrael Lejzerowicz (pl) – one of the most promising expressionists of the new generation – killed at Auschwitz, and numerous others. Jewish children were mainly enrolled in religious schools. During the school year of 1937–1938 there were 226 elementary schools and twelve high schools as well as fourteen vocational schools with either Yiddish or Hebrew as the instructional language. A network of 219 secular Yiddish language schools was run by TSYSHO (Central Yiddish School Organization) with 24,000 students in 1929. The Realgymnazye run in Wilno by TSBK (branch of TSYSHO) was the first modern high school in history in which Yiddish was the language of instruction.

== See also ==
- Central Industrial Region, one of the biggest economic projects of the Second Polish Republic
- Sztafeta book of analysis written by Melchior Wańkowicz
- German–Polish customs war (1925–1934), consequence of Poland's strive for independence
- Skamander group of experimental poets founded in 1918
- Jarosław Iwaszkiewicz
