= Clausula =

Clausula may refer to:

- Clausula (music)
- Clausula (rhetoric)
