= Jan Lorentowicz =

Polish theatre director, literary critic and editor (1868-1940)

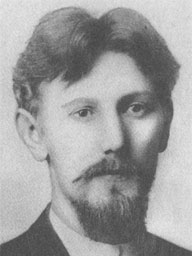
- Born: 14 March 1868; Pabianice
- Died: 15 January 1940 (aged 71); Warsaw
- Writing career
- Notable works: Polska pieśń miłosna Dwadzieścia lat teatru Ziemia polska w pieśni

Jan Lorentowicz (14 March 1868 – 15 January 1940; occasional pen name, M. Chropieński) was a Polish theatre director, literary critic, publicist, editor and book collector; president of the Polish PEN Club (1925–27); and from 1938, an elected member of the prestigious Polish Academy of Literature.

In 1919, in celebration of Poland's return to independence (1918) after over a century of partitions, Lorentowicz published the most complete collected works of the poet Jan Kochanowski (1530–1584), who had laid the foundations for Polish literary language.

== Life ==
Lorentowicz was born in Pabianice, in present-day central Poland, in 1868, five years after the opening of the Polish 1863 Uprising that was eventually suppressed by the Russian Imperial Army. His parents had moved to present-day central Poland from the old eastern Kresy borderlands, escaping poverty and oppression. Jan obtained his secondary-school diploma at Płock by way of home schooling and soon went to France, where he lived until 1903 and studied at the Sorbonne.

While in Paris, he became editor-in-chief of Pobudka (Awake!) in 1891, and on 17 November 1892 took part in an assembly leading to the founding of the Polish Socialist Party (Polska Partia Socjalistyczna, or PPS). A major controversy surrounded the Paris conference, regarding the potential use of terror by the PPS. Supporters of such violence against the Russian governorate included Aleksander Dębski, but the idea did not take hold and no terror attack took place in the following decade.

In 1903 Lorentowicz returned to Poland and settled in Warsaw.

He joined the editorial board of Kurier Codzienny as managing editor about the time of the Polish Revolution of 1905, and in 1906–18 served as literary editor of Nowa Gazeta (the New Gazette). He co-founded the Polish Society of Writers and Journalists in 1909 and served as its president, 1916–18. Poland's freedom was in the air.

In 1916–22 Lorentowicz was director of the Warsaw School of Drama and, in 1918–22, executive director of the Warsaw City Theatres. In 1919 he published a three-volume collected works of the 16th-century poet Jan Kochanowski, who had founded Polish literary language; in 1925 the book on Władysław Reymont, commemorating Reymont's Nobel Prize in Literature; and the same year became president of the Polish PEN Club after the death of Stefan Żeromski.

In 1926–28 Lorentowicz served as director of Warsaw's National Theatre, and in 1935 he completed the publication of his monumental five-volume monograph, Dwadzieścia lat teatru (Twenty Years of Theatre), comprising some 480 collected articles. In 1938 he was elected a member of the Polish Academy of Literature after the untimely death of Piotr Choynowski and Bolesław Leśmian. He continued publishing until the Nazi German invasion of Poland, and died in Warsaw in mid-January 1940. Lorentowicz was buried in the city's Powązki Cemetery.

== Legacy ==
Jan Lorentowicz received many awards for his contributions to theatre and its history, including the French Legion of Honour and the Polish Order of Polonia Restituta. He was well known for his vast collection of books, some rare and expensive. He was a Renaissance man with broad interests and accomplishments. Immediately after World War I he participated in rebuilding theatre in Poland's capital. His Dwadzieścia lat teatru is a primary source of information on the history of Warsaw theatre in 1904–34. To this day, Poland's interwar actors and cultural luminaries are best remembered through his monographs, including Spojrzenie wstecz (Looking Back), Dzieje teatru w Polsce (History of Theater in Poland), and Teatr Polski w Warszawie (Polish Theater in Warsaw). In 1989 the Pabianice public library was named for him.

The memoirs of Lorentowicz's daughter – writer, teacher and award-winning set-designer Irena Lorentowicz – Oczarowania (Enchantments) show Jan Lorentowicz as a remarkable father. Irena, who never married, inherited part of his library. In old age demented and alone, she was found by a friend in the middle of her small Warsaw apartment, cutting up books with scissors into a pile of scraps. She died in 1985 and was buried near her father.

== Works ==
- Jan Lorentowicz, Polska pieśń miłosna: antologia (1913, in Polish), book, 8 editions
- Jan Lorentowicz, Ziemia polska w pieśni: antologia (1913, in Polish), book, 6 editions
- Jan Lorentowicz, Polska pieśń niepodległa; zarys literacki (1916 and 1917, in Polish), book, 3 editions
- Jan Lorentowicz (editor), Dzieła polskie Jana Kochanowskiego: wydanie kompletne (1919, in Polish), book
- Jan Lorentowicz, Ladislas Reymont: essai sur son œuvre (1924, 1925, in French, and 3 other languages), book, 6 editions
- Jan Lorentowicz, Dwadzieścia lat teatru (1929 and 1930, in 3 languages), book in 4 volumes, 5 editions
- Jan Lorentowicz, La Pologne en France; essai d'une bibliographie raisonée (1935, in French), book, 5 editions
- Jan Lorentowicz, Spojrzenie wstecz (1935), book, 12 editions in 3 languages
- Jan Lorentowicz, Teatry w stolicy i inne artykuły (in Polish), book, 4 editions
- Jan Lorentowicz, Teatr Polski w Warszawie, 1913-1938 (1938, in Polish and English), book, 2 editions
- Jan Lorentowicz, Młoda Polska (in Polish), book in 3 volumes
- Jean Lorentowicz, Littérature, Théâtre, beaux-arts (1935, in French and undetermined), book, 3 editions
- Jan Lorentowicz, Juljusz Slowacki śród Francuzów; szkic literacki (1927, in Polish and English), book, 3 editions
- Jan Lorentowicz, La Pologne en France: essai d'une bibliographie raisonnée. Avec la collaboration de A. M. Chmurski. II Encyclopédies, langue, voyage, histoire (1938, in French), book, 1 edition
- Jan Lorentowicz, Nowa francya literacka: portrety i wrażenia (1911, in Polish), book, 3 editions
- Jan Lorentowicz, Géographie, sciences, droit, suppléments (1941, in French), book, 2 editions
- Jan Lorentowicz (editor), Wielcy poeci romantyczni Polski: Mickiewicz, - Słowacki, -Krasiński by Gabriel Sarrazin (in Polish), book

== See also ==
- Polish literature
- Bolesław Prus, note 26.
