= Wacław Sieroszewski =

Polish writer and activist (1858–1945)

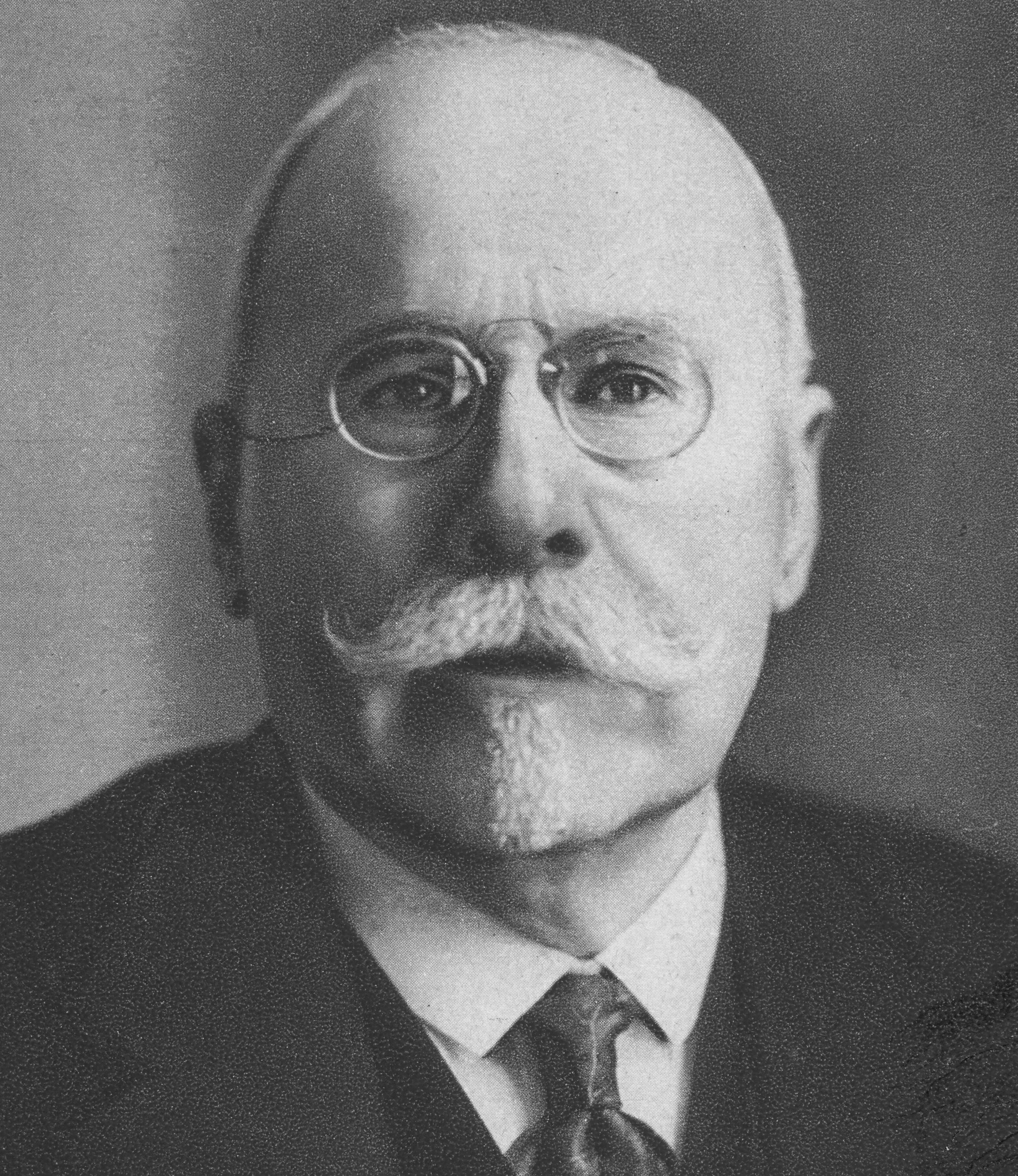
- Wacław Sieroszewski before World War II

President of the Polish Academy of Literature
- In office 1933–1939
- Preceded by: position established
- Succeeded by: position abolished

Member of the Senate of Poland
- In office 1935–1938

President of the Trade Union of Polish Writers
- In office 1927–1930
- Preceded by: Juliusz Kaden-Bandrowski

Personal details
- Born: August 24, 1858 Gmina Tłuszcz, Russian Empire
- Died: April 20, 1945 (aged 86) Piaseczno, Poland
- Resting place: Powązki Cemetery, Warsaw
- Party: Polish Socialist Party
- Awards: Virtuti Militari

Military service
- Allegiance: Austria-Hungary
- Branch/service: Austro-Hungarian Army
- Years of service: 1914-1915
- Unit: 1st Uhlans Regiment of Polish Legions
- Battles/wars: World War One

Wacław Kajetan Sieroszewski (24 August 1858 – 20 April 1945) was a Polish writer, Polish Socialist Party activist, and soldier in the World War I-era Polish Legions (decorated with the Virtuti Militari). For activities subversive of the Russian Empire, he had spent many years in Siberian exile.

Sieroszewski's Siberian experiences became the subjects of his many stories and novels—Na kresach lasów (At the Edge of the Woods, 1894), Dno nędzy (The Depths of Misery, 1900), Risztau (1899), Ucieczka (The Escape, 1904), Zamorski diabeł (The Overseas Devil, 1900). He also authored the popular Bajki (Fables, 1910). His 12 lat w kraju Jakutów (12 years in the Yakut country, 1900) provides the first extensive ethnographic account of the Yakut people.

Sieroszewski visited Korea (then the Korean Empire) in 1903. He arrived via boat to Busan, then traveled through the peninsula with an interpreter, speaking with locals on the way to the capital Seoul. He published a book on his experiences in the peninsula in 1905. The trip appeared to make an impression on him, and he would frequently mention Korea in later interviews. He once likened Korea's political situation, in which multiple foreign powers were encroaching on it, to Poland's.

Whilst in Paris in 1910, he heard that Jan Wacław Machajski had been asking his friend Stefan Żeromski to provide a reference so that Machajski's wife would be employed by Kazimierz Dłuski. Having heard rumours circulated by the Polish Social Democratic Party of Galicia that Machajski was a terrorist, Sieroszewski wrote to Dłuski warning against getting involved with the Machajskis. When this letter fell into the hands of the police, they promptly arrested Machajski.

== Professional background ==
Under the Second Polish Republic, Sieroszewski was a senator, and president of the Union of Polish Writers (Związek Zawodowy Literatów Polskich, 1927–30) and the Polish Academy of Literature (Polska Akademia Literatury, 1933–1939).

== Selected filmography ==
- Exile to Siberia (1930)
