= Personnel (film) =

- Theatrical release poster
- Written by: Krzysztof Kieślowski
- Directed by: Krzysztof Kieślowski
- Starring: Juliusz Machulski; Michal Tarkowski; Wlodzimierz Borunski
- Country of origin: Poland
- Original language: Polish

Production
- Producer: Zespol Filmowy
- Cinematography: Witold Stok
- Editor: Lidia Zonn
- Running time: 72 minutes

Original release
- Release: 13 January 1976

Personnel (Polish: Personel) is a 1975 Polish television drama film written and directed by Krzysztof Kieślowski and starring Juliusz Machulski, Michal Tarkowski, and Wlodzimierz Borunski. The film won the Grand Prize during the Mannheim International Filmfestival in October 1975 and numerous awards at national festivals, including the Grand Prix IV Koszalin Film Encounters "The Young and Film" in 1976. The film also won the Grand Prize in the field of television films in the Third Polish Film Festival in Gdańsk in 1976, where Kieślowski was also honored by the award of journalists. Personnel is Krzysztof Kieślowski's first feature-length film.

== Plot ==
Romek Januchta (Juliusz Machulski) is a sensitive and honest young man who has a fascination with the magic of art. He finds work as a tailor at the opera. Confronted by the behind the scenes reality of stage productions—the bickering, the petty jealousies, the vindictiveness, and the corruption—Romek's illusions are soon shattered. A fellow tailor has been fired through the maliciousness of one of the performers, and Romek is faced with the choice of denouncing his friend.

== Cast ==
- Juliusz Machulski as Romek Januchta
- Michal Tarkowski as Sowa
- Wlodzimierz Borunski
- Edward Ciosek
- Waldemar Karst
- Wilhelm Klonowski
- Mieczyslaw Kobek
- Helena Kowalczykowa as Romek's aunt
- Tomasz Lengren
- Irena Lorentowicz
- Ludwik Mika
- Henryk Sawicki
- Andrzej Siedlecki
- Krzysztof Sitarski
- Janusz Skalski

== Reception ==
=== Awards and nominations ===
- 1975 Mannheim International Filmfestival Grand Prize (Krzysztof Kieślowski) Won
- 1976 Polish Film Festival Critics Award for Television Film (Krzysztof Kieślowski) Won
- 1976 Polish Film Festival Silver Lion Award (Krzysztof Kieślowski) Won
