= Irena Lorentowicz =

Polish artist, set designer and art teacher (1908–1985)

- Born: 25 September 1908; Warsaw, Poland
- Died: 11 February 1985 (aged 76); Warsaw
- Known for: Painting and set and costume design
- Parent(s): Jan Lorentowicz and Ewa Lorentowicz (née Rościszewska)

Irena Lorentowicz (1908–1985) was a Polish artist, set and costume designer, and art teacher.

== Early life and education ==
Lorentowicz was born on 25 September 1908 in the Polish capital of Warsaw. She was the daughter of Jan Lorentowicz, a theatre director, critic, and publicist, and Ewa Lorentowicz (née Rościszewska), a graphic artist and bookbinder. From 1925 to 1931, she studied at the School of Fine Arts in Warsaw under the guidance of Miłosz Kotarbiński and Tadeusz Pruszkowski. With the latter, she participated in plein-air painting sessions in Kazimierz Dolny in Poland. At one of these events, she met the writer, Maria Kuncewiczowa, and they became lifelong friends. In 1931, she travelled for six months to Czechoslovakia, Austria, Italy, France, Spain, and Belgium. In 1934–35 she studied set design at the State Institute of Theatre Arts (PIST) and trained in theatre decoration. At an early age she married Jan Karwowski, but the marriage did not last.

== Paris ==
Between 1930 and 1935, Lorentowicz worked as a set designer with Warsaw's theatres and cabarets. In 1935 she was chosen by the management of the Paris Opera to design the set for the 1936 Paris premiere of Karol Szymanowski's ballet Harnasie, directed by Leon Schiller. Her stage and costume designs were considered innovative for the time and were well received. As a result, she was awarded a five-year scholarship by the French government. In 1937 she did the set design for performances by the Polish National Ballet of the ballet Return, with music by Bolesław Woytowicz. She also designed for French companies, including Opéra-Comique and the Casino de Paris, as well as doing sets for ballets by Serge Lifar. Additionally, she studied humanities at the Sorbonne and exhibited her paintings, including in the February 1937 exhibition called Les femmes artistes d'Europe, the first international all-woman art show in France, held at the Jeu de Paume in Paris. In May 1937, she presented more than a dozen set designs at the Exposition Internationale des Arts et Techniques dans la Vie Moderne in Paris, receiving a gold medal. Her work was also exhibited at the 1939 New York World's Fair. While in Paris, she also found time to send articles on cultural events in that city to newspapers in Poland, such as the Kurjer Warszawski and Wiadomości Literackie .

== United States ==
After the outbreak of World War II she initially stayed in Paris but, following the Battle of France in May–June 1940, she made her way with difficulty through France, Spain and Portugal to the Portuguese capital, Lisbon, from where she was eventually able to emigrate to the United States in 1941. There she designed sets for the Polish Theatre of Artists in New York, which performed in many cities in the US, as well as with the Metropolitan Opera House in New York and the Ruth Sorel ballet company. She also worked in Canada. Later, she did sacred paintings, frescoes, and stained glass, including for the Holy Trinity Church in Chicago, and produced illustrations for children's and young adult's books. She taught painting at schools in New York and gave lectures on Polish culture and art. While in the US she wrote for the New York Herald Tribune and Polish newspapers.

== Return to Poland ==
In 1959 or 1960, Lorentowicz returned to Poland. She found work designing sets for musical theatres in Poznań, Bytom, Wrocław, Szczecin, and for the Polish Dance Ensemble of Eugeniusz Papliński in Łódź. In Warsaw, she designed sets for opera premieres and taught the history of costumes and theatre technique at the State Secondary School of Theatre Technology until 1969. Her last work as a set designer was for Die Fledermaus at the Warsaw Operetta in 1971. From then she mainly occupied herself with painting. She also found time to write her memoirs, called Oczarowania (Enchantments), which were published in Warsaw in 1972. The Warsaw theatre museum organized an exhibition of her work with the same name in 1981, including her designs for Harnasie in Paris. One of her students had been the film director, Krzysztof Kieślowski, who invited her to appear as herself in the 1975 television drama, Personnel.

== Death and legacy ==
Lorentowicz died in Warsaw on 11 February 1985. Only a few of her works are held in museums, largely because of her practice of giving them away to friends. The Nadwiślańskie Museum in Kazimierz Dolny has a collection of costume designs by her and, in 2022, also organized an exhibition of her work, consisting of loans from private collections.
