= Leopold Staff =

Polish poet (1878–1957)

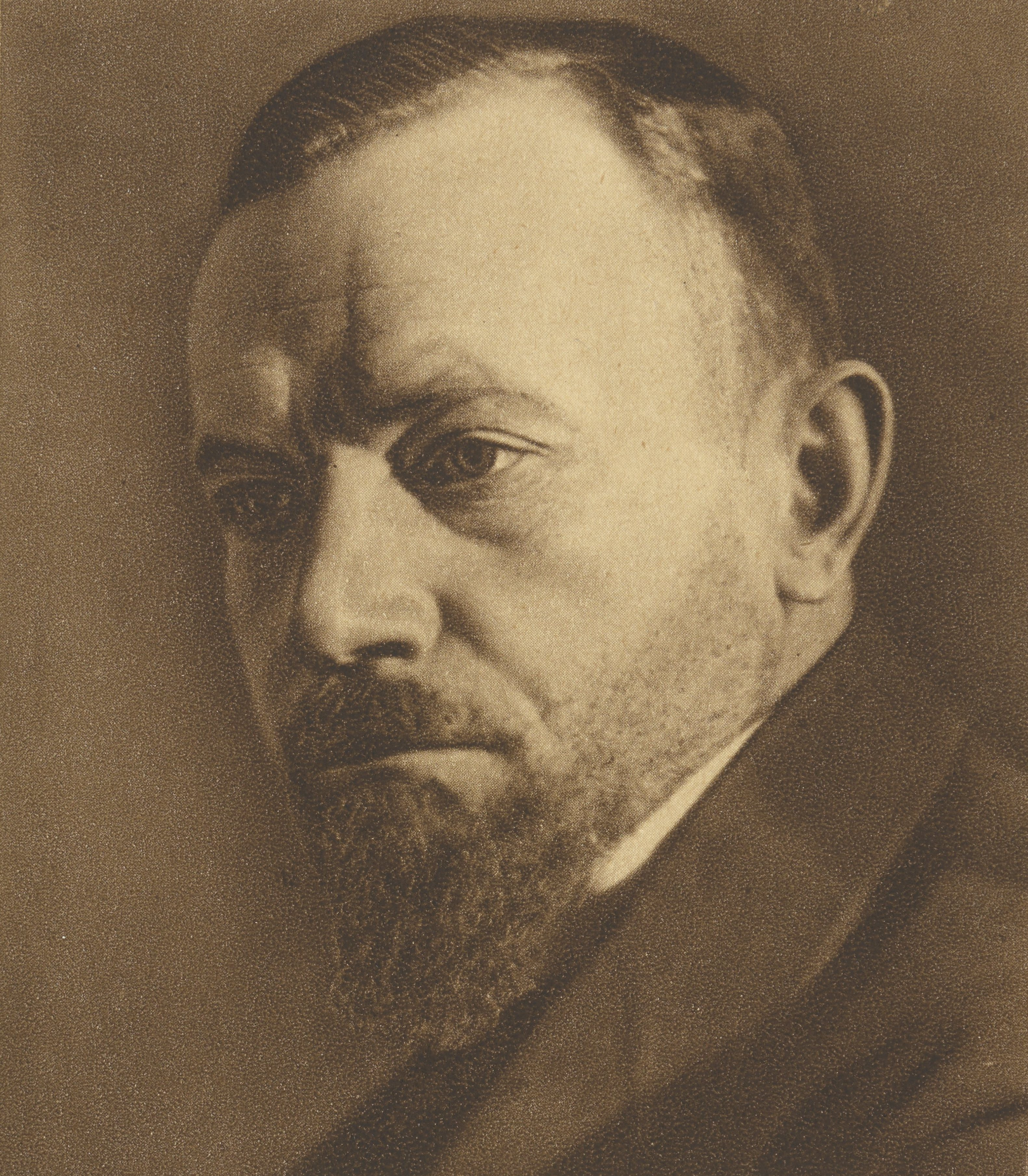
- Born: Leopold Staff; 14 November 1878; Lemberg, Austrian partition
- Died: 31 May 1957 (aged 78); Skarżysko-Kamienna, Poland
- Occupations: Poet, artist
- Writing career
- Language: Polish

Leopold Henryk Staff (November 14, 1878 – May 31, 1957) was a Polish poet; an artist of European modernism twice granted the Degree of Doctor honoris causa by universities in Warsaw and in Kraków. He was also nominated for the Nobel Prize in Literature by Polish PEN Club. Representative of classicism and symbolism in the poetry of Young Poland, he was an author of many philosophical poems influenced by the philosophy of Friedrich Nietzsche (from whom he translated several books into Polish), the ideas of Franciscan order as well as paradoxes of Christianity.

== Life ==
Staff was born in Lwów (then in the Austrian partition; now Lviv, Ukraine) during the military partitions of Poland. He was one of three children of the local confectioner of Czech & German origin. He studied law and philosophy at the Lwów University, and in 1918 settled in Warsaw at the cusp of Poland's return to independence. He died at the age of 78 in Skarżysko-Kamienna soon after the end of Stalinism in postwar Poland, and was buried in Warsaw at the renowned Powązki Cemetery.

Staff was highly influential in the interwar period, including in the literary life of Julian Tuwim, one of Poland's best-known poets. He served as vice-president of the Polish Academy of Literature since 1933, and since 1949 resided in Warsaw.

== Literary career ==
Staff's writing can be divided into three periods: Young Poland until 1918, Interwar period (1918–39), and postwar Poland (following the end of World War II).

In the early 20th century, Staff became probably the most famous and influential Polish poet. He called his popularity a retiring, soft glory. He was also the main role-model for Polish group of experimental poets named Skamander (founded in 1918). In the 1950s, he moved to blank verse in line with the ideals of Polish avant-garde.

Some of his best-known short poems include The Bridge ("Most"), Foundations ("Podwaliny", transl. by Czesław Miłosz), and Three Towns ("Trzy miasta", 1954).
