= Clausula (rhetoric) =

Rhythmic sentence ending used in rhetoric

In Roman rhetoric, a clausula (/ˈklɔːzjʊlə/, plural clausulae /ˈklɔːzjʊli/; Latin for "little close or conclusion") was a rhythmic figure used to add finality to the end of a sentence or phrase. There was a large range of popular clausulae. One of the most common rhythms was cretic + trochee (– u – – x), for example vīta trānscurrit or illa tempestās, and variations of this, such as the well-known Ciceronian esse videātur (– u uu – x).

Different authors had different preferences for clausulae. For example, the cretic + trochee and its variants make up 35% of the clausulae in Seneca's letters, but only 11% of the clausulae in Livy's history. Conversely, the double spondee (e.g. accēpērunt – – – –) makes up 36% of Livy's clausulae, but only 11% in Seneca's letters.

== Types of clausulae ==
Every long sentence can be divided into sections called by the Greek word cola (singular colon), in Latin membra (singular membrum); the last few syllables of every colon tend to conform to certain favourite rhythmic patterns, which are known as clausulae. Shorter cola were known as commata /ˈkɒmətə/ (singular comma), or in Latin incīsa (singular incīsum), which also often display rhythmic endings.

The constant use of clausulae in Cicero's speeches was first thoroughly investigated by the Polish philologist Tadeusz Zieliński in a monumental work published in German in 1904, following an earlier dissertation by G. Wüst in 1881 and work by other scholars. Zieliński established that a Ciceronian clausula had two parts: a "base", generally a cretic | – u – | or a variation on it, and a "cadence", generally of a trochaic rhythm such as | – x |, | – u x |, or | – u – x |. (Here "–" indicates a long syllable, "u" a short syllable, and "x" a syllable which can be either long or short, while "|" demarcates the edges of these parts.)

The most common clausulae in Cicero are the following:

- | – u – | – x | and variations (32.4% of Cicero's clausulae)
- | – x – | – u x | (24.4%)
- | – x – | – u – x | (30.1%)

Variations may include resolving one of the long syllables in the rhythm into two short ones, for example | – u uu | – x | (esse videātur) instead of | – u – | – x |. Another type of allowable variation is to substitute | – uu – | or | – u – – | for the base.

The above clausulae account for about 87% of Cicero's clausulae. Other clausulae are rarer. For example, the cadence may have five elements | – u – u – | or consist of two spondees | – – – – |. This last type (commoner in Livy than in Cicero) is compared by Zieliński to the blows of a hammer. Certain clausulae, such as the hexameter ending | – u u | – x |, were avoided (it occurs in Cicero, but only in about 0.6% of cases, and often for a reason such as mock-heroic description).

Zieliński noted that Cicero's preferences changed gradually over the years. For example, the rhythm | – – – | – u x | was more common in his earlier speeches, while from his consulate onwards he preferred the lighter | – u – | – u x |.

According to Zieliński, it is a principle of clausulae that the word-accent tends to follow the ictus of the feet, that is, there is usually an accent on the first syllable of the base and on the penultimate long syllable of the cadence, e.g. ílla tempéstās, egéstās audácia, incéndium civitátis, Cáesarī d(e) eius áctīs, etc. However, there are often exceptions to this rule, and Cicero was not so strict as later writers such as Augustine and Arnobius.

There is no doubt that the skilful use of clausulae was one of the techniques which an orator used to excite an audience. Cicero writes of one occasion when the use of a certain clausula (a dichoreus or double trochee – u – x) by the orator Carbo the Younger was so effective that the audience all gave a shout.

== Examples from Cicero ==
An example of Cicero's use of clausulae in a speech is given below, with the two sentences divided into cola:

ecc(e) illa tempestās, | – u – | – – |
cālīgō bonōr(um) et subit(a) atqu(e) imprōvīsa formīdo, | – u – | – – |
tenebrae rēī pūblicae, | – – – | – u – |
ruīn(a) atqu(e) incendium cīvitātis, | – u – | – u – – |
terror iniectus Caesarī d(ē) eius āctīs, | – u – | – u – – |
metus caedis bonīs omnibus, | – u – | – u – |
cōnsulum scelus, cupiditās, egestās, audācia! | – – – | – u – |

sī non s(um) adiūtus, non dēbuī; | – – – | – u – |
sī dēsertus, sibī fortasse prōvīdit; | – u – | – – |
s(ī) eti(am) oppugnātus, ut quīd(am) aut putant aut volunt, | – u – | – u – |
violāt(a) amīcitia (e)st, | – u – | uu – |
accēp(ī) iniūriam; | – – – | – u – |
inimīcus esse dēbuī, nōn negō. | – u – | – u – |

"Behold that storm, the gloom of good men and a sudden and unforeseen fear, the darkness of the republic, the ruin and conflagration of the state, terror given to Caesar concerning his acts, fear of slaughter for all good men, the wickedness, greed, indigence, and audacity of the consuls! If I was not helped, I did not deserve it; if I was deserted, perhaps he was providing for his own safety; if I was even attacked, as certain people either think or wish, our friendship was violated, I received an injury; I should have been his enemy, I do not deny it."

The "heroic clausula" (– uu – x), which resembles a hexameter ending, is rare but can be used for comic effect, as in the following quotation from pro Caelio:

in balneīs dēlituērunt: | – u – | – uu – – |
testīs ēgregiōs! | – – – | uu – |
dein temerē prōsiluērunt: | – uu – | – uu – – |
hominēs temperantīs! | uu – | – u – – |

"They hid in the baths. Outstanding witnesses! Then they rashly leapt out. Cool-headed men!"

As Adams points out, the passage is made even funnier by the pun on testes, which can mean "testicles" as well as "witnesses".

The following passage from the 2nd Catilinarian oration shows some of the less commonly used cadences, including the five-syllable | – u – u – | and the "hammer-blow" spondaic | – – – – |:

nōn est iam lēnitātī locus; | – u – | – u – |
sevēritātem rēs ipsa flāgitat. | – – – | – u – u – |
ūn(um) etiam nunc concēdam: | – uu – | – – – – |
exeant, proficīscantur; | – uu – | – – |
nē patiantur dēsīderiō suī Catilīnam miserum tābēscere. | uu – – | – u – |
dēmōnstrāb(o) iter: Aurēliā viā profectus est; | – uu – | – u – u – u – u – |
s(ī) accelerāre volent, ad vesperam cōnsequentur. | – u – | – u – – |

"There is no place for leniency any longer; the situation itself calls for severity. But one thing I will concede even now: let them go out, let them depart; let them not allow Catiline to pine away miserably with desire for them. I will show them the route: he departed by the Aurelian Way. If they are willing to hurry, by evening they will catch up with him."

It is characteristic of the emphatic spondaic ending (– – – –) that in Cicero there is always a word-break between the base and the cadence. With the clausula – u – – x on the other hand, as in illa tempestas, the most usual place for a word-break is after the second syllable.

The following passage from the pro Scauro is analysed explicitly by Cicero himself into four incīsa (commata), followed by two membra (cola), and then a long spondaic period ending in a dichoreus or double trochee:

domus tibī deerat? at habēbās. | u | – u – | – – || uu – – |
pecūnia superābat? at egēbās. | u | – uu uu | – – || uu – – |
incurrist(i) āmēns in columnās, | – – | – – – | – u – – |
in aliēnōs īnsānus īnsānistī; | u u u – – – | – u – | – – – |
dēpressam, caecam, iacentem domum | – – – – | – u – | – u – |
plūris quam t(e) et quam fortūnās tuās aestimāstī. | – – – – – – – | – u – | – u – – |

"Did you lack a house? No, you already had one. Did you have plenty of money? No, you didn't have enough. You ran madly into the columns, you raged crazily against other people's slaves; you reckoned a decrepit, dark, fallen down house as worth more than yourself and your fortunes."

Cicero comments that the incīsa (commata), because of their shortness, are rather freer in their rhythm, and should be used "like little daggers". The rhythmical period (numerōsa comprehēnsiō), he says, is a longer sentence composed of at least two cola, and is more sparingly used. The style which consists of a mixture of commata, cola, and the occasional longer period is particularly effective, he says, in passages arguing a case or refuting one.

== Clausulae in other writers ==
Clausulae are found not only in Cicero but in many Roman (as well as Greek and medieval) writers, especially in oratory but also in other types of writing. Each writer has their own preferences and "rhythmic signature". For example, Livy avoids clausulae which are common in Cicero, such as | – u – | – x |, but frequently ends a sentence with a series of long syllables, for example lēgātī Rōmān(i) occurrērunt.

The earliest orator to make extensive use of rhythmic prose in Greek is said to have been the sophist Thrasymachus of Chalcedon (the same person who appears as a speaker in book 1 of Plato's Republic). Plato himself favoured the clausulae | – u – | – u x |, | – – – | – u x |, and | – u u | – u x |, among others. His preferences changed in the course of his life, and he used | u u u x | and | – u u u – x | more often in the later works. Lysias, Aeschines, Isaeus, Plutarch and others also had their own preferences. Clausulae are prominent in the orations of Demosthenes, especially the ditrochaeus (– u – x), dispondaeus (– – – x), cretic + trochee (– u – – x), and choriamb + trochee (– uu – – x). But Demosthenes' most characteristic practice (known as "Blass's Law") is to avoid series of more than three short syllables anywhere in his sentences. Some writers such as Thucydides, wrote prose almost free of rhythmical influence, however.

In Latin, rhythmical prose was characteristic of the so-called "Asiatic" style of oratory, whereas followers of the plainer "Attic" style avoided it. The younger Pliny, Seneca, Suetonius, Apuleius and Tertullian more or less followed the Ciceronian pattern, though several writers avoided | – – – | – u x | and the famous esse videātur clausula | – u u u | – x |, as being overly Ciceronian.

== Recent research ==
Recently computer software has been written to analyse large quantities of Latin prose from numerous authors. This has confirmed the findings of earlier investigators and made it easy to compare one author with another. Thus for example, it appears that the double cretic clausula (– x – – u –) is quite common in Cato's book on farming (21%) but rare in Varro's work on the same subject (8%). The cretic + trochee (– u – – x) is exceptionally common in Curtius Rufus (48%). This same cretic + trochee occurs in 34% of the clausulae in Cicero's Catilinarian orations, but in only 17% of clausulae in his letters to Atticus.

Those clausulae which are considered most "rhythmic" or "artistic" are the following together with their variants:

- cretic + trochee (– u – – x)
- cretic/molossus + cretic (– x – – u –)
- double trochee (– u – x)
- hypodochmiac (– u – u x)

Cicero's speeches typically have a high percentage of clausulae of the "artistic" type, for example 90% in the Catilinarians. Even in the letters to Atticus the percentage is 70%. In fact, most of the 25 authors analysed by Keeline and Kirby have a majority of artistic-type clausulae. Suetonius's biographies have 81%, as do Seneca's letters; Nepos's lives have 70%; Caesar's Gallic War has a slightly lower percentage (63%). Even a technical writer such as Vitruvius in his de Architectura has 61%, and the medical writer Celsus has 70%.

Sallust and Livy, however, seem to have avoided the "artistic" clausulae or used them less often. Sallust's Jugurthine War has only 46% of such clausulae. Livy varies in different parts of his work. In books 1–10 the percentage of "artistic" clausulae is 50%, but in books 21–30 it is only 33%. The spondaic clausula (as in accēpērunt) is more common in Livy than in other writers, but it too varies, being less common in books 1–10 (29%) and more common in books 21–30 (40%).

Keeline and Kirby also investigate whether there is any difference in clausula use in historical works between the narrative parts and the speeches. For Sallust there appears to be almost no difference. However, in Tacitus's Histories there is a difference, since the narrative parts have 56% "artistic" clausulae, while the speeches have 68%. (Similar percentages are found in Tacitus's earliest work, the Agricola.) However, in Tacitus's last work, the Annals, the difference is much less, the narrative having 56% as before but the speeches only 60%. Two other early works of Tacitus, the Dialogus (70%) and the Germania (67%), are more similar to the speeches of the Histories than to the narrative.

Pliny the Younger, both in his one surviving oration, the Panegyricus, and in his letters, shows a high proportion of "artistic" clausulae, with 85% in both works. His favourite clausula is the cretic + trochee (– u – – x), with 40%. However, the letters of the Emperor Trajan, which are included in book 10 of Pliny's letters, have a different profile, with 68% artistic clausulae overall, and only 26% cretic + trochee.

For the purpose of obtaining the percentages given above, a clausula was defined as the last few syllables leading up to places where editors have traditionally punctuated the Latin text with a full-stop, question-mark, exclamation-mark, colon, or semicolon. The researchers acknowledge that clausulae can also often be found before places where editors place a comma, but not consistently so, and for this reason this type was excluded from the calculations.

== Medieval clausulae (cursūs) ==
In the medieval period, Latin ceased to be pronounced in a quantitative way, and clausulae tended to be accentual rather than based on quantity. Three end-of-sentence rhythms were especially favoured, the so called plānus (– x x – x) (where – indicates an accented syllable and x an unaccented one), the tardus (– x x – x x), and the velōx (– x x x x – x). These rhythms are found for example in the writings of Gregory of Tours (6th century), Bernard of Clairvaux and Héloïse (12th century), and Dante (13th-14th century). They are known to modern scholars (although apparently not to the medieval writers themselves) as cursūs. However, not all writers made use of them. The professors of the period specified that the last word of the sentence had to be of either three or four syllables.

== Ancient writers on clausulae ==
The first writer to mention rhythm in prose is Aristotle in his Ars Rhētorica; he says that prose should not be entirely metrical, like poetry, but also not unrhythmical either. Cicero himself discusses the use of clausulae in his books on oratory, especially in dē Ōrātōre 3.173-198, and Ōrātor 204-226. Terentianus Maurus (c. 290 AD) also discusses clausulae in a work itself written in verse. He says of the cretic (– u –) that it is the best kind of foot, especially when used in penultimate position before a dactyl (– u x). The teacher of rhetoric Quintilian treats clausulae at length, especially in books 5 and 9; like Terentianus, he approves of the double cretic | – u – | – u x |, but recommends avoiding the heroic clausula | – x – | – uu – x |, since it too much resembles the end of a line of verse.

== Applications of clausula-study ==
The analysis of a piece of Latin into cola and clausulae can not only help the modern student to read the passage with authentic phrasing, but also is a useful tool in investigating an author's style. So, for example, Riggsby notes that the cola in the earlier part of the 2nd Catilinarian oration are shorter, and the clausulae more varied, than in the last paragraph. He takes this as an indication of Cicero's shift in emphasis from chaos and danger to peace and resolution. Often the clausulae will throw light on the writer's choice of word, tense or word order. For example, patent portae, proficīscere! "the gates are open; depart!" makes an effective clausula, whereas *portae patent, proficīscere does not. Clausulae can also help editors decide which of two manuscript readings is the correct one, or whether an editor's conjecture is acceptable.

Clausulae have sometimes helped editors to decide on the authenticity or otherwise of a work. For example, the speech dē domō suā, whose authorship was once in doubt, has been shown to exhibit exactly the same proportions of clausulae as Cicero's other speeches. In the case of authors whose practice varied over the years, such as Plato, clausulae analysis can throw light on the date of a work.

From examining the clausulae it is sometimes possible to uncover the exact pronunciation of individual words by a particular author. For example, it appears that Cicero pronounced reddūcō "I bring back" and relliquus "remaining" with a long first syllable, as did Lucretius. Nōn modō "not only" was pronounced with the last vowel long. For ordinary nouns ending in -ium or -ius, the genitive -i was preferred by Cicero (e.g. iūdicī "of the trial"), although in proper names such as Clōdiī "of Clodius" the ending "-iī" was often used. In nīl and nihil "nothing" and perīculum and perīclum "danger" both forms occur. In the future perfect tense, as in fēcerīmus "we'll have made", it appears that Cicero, contrary to the rule given in some grammars such as Kennedy, pronounced the "i" long, as did his contemporary Catullus.

In many instances, where manuscripts of a text differ, the clausula can help to decide which is the original reading. For example, in Cicero's In Pisonem 9, Fūfi(a) ēversa (e)st (– u – – –) is preferable to Fūfia versa (e)st (– u u – –). An emendation suggested by an editor that corrupts a good clausula is to be regarded with suspicion.

== Bibliography ==
- Adams, Elizabeth D. (2013). Esse videtur: Occurrences of Heroic Clausulae in Cicero’s Orations. (University of Kansas MA thesis).
- Berry, D. H. (ed). (1996) Cicero: Pro P. Sulla Oratio. Cambridge.
- Clark, Albert C. (1905). Review: Zielinski's Clauselgesetz (available on JSTOR)
- Cunningham, Maurice P. (1957) "Some Phonetic Aspects of Word Order Patterns in Latin". Proceedings of the American Philosophical Society, Vol. 101, No. 5, pp. 481–505.
- Grillo, Luca (ed.) (2015). Cicero's de Provinciis Consularibus Oratio. OUP.
- Habinek, Thomas N. (1985). The Colometry of Latin Prose. University of California Press.
- Keeline, Tom; Kirby, Tyler (2019). "Auceps syllabarum: A Digital Analysis of Latin Prose Rhythm". Journal of Roman Studies 109 (2019), pp. 161–204.
- Major, Tristan (2023). "Rhythmic «cursus» in Pre-Conquest Anglo-Latin Literature". Filologia mediolatina 30 (2023), pp. 1-56.
- Nisbet, R. G. M. (1961). Cicero: In L. Calpurniam Pisonem Oratio. Oxford. pp. xvii–xx.
- Riggsby, Andrew M. (2010). “Form as global strategy in Cicero’s Second Catilinarian.” In Berry, D. H., and Erskine, A., eds. Form and Function in Roman Oratory, New York: Cambridge. 92–104.
- Shewring, W.H. & Denniston, J.D. (1970). "Prose Rhythm", in The Oxford Classical Dictionary, 2nd edition.pp. 888–890.
- Srebrny, Stefan (1947 (2013)) Tadeusz Zieliński (1859-1944). (English translation of Polish original.)
- Tunberg, Terence O. (1996) "Prose Styles and Cursus". In Mantello, F. A. C. & Rigg, A. G. Medieval Latin: An Introduction and Bibliographical Guide, pp. 111–120.
