= Polish Academy of Literature =

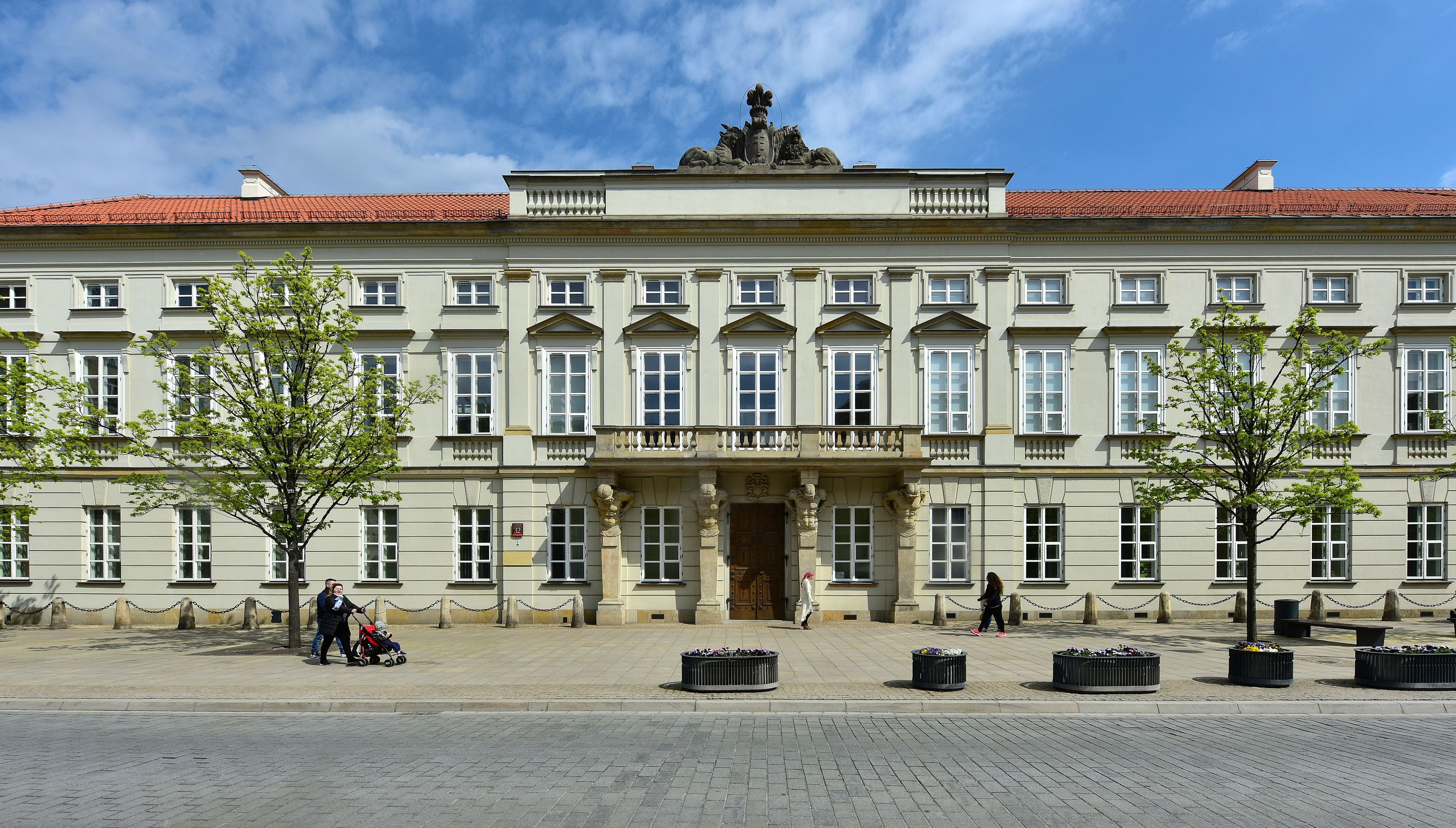
Tyszkiewicz Palace, formerly the residence of the Polish Academy of Literature in Warsaw along Krakowskie Przedmieście

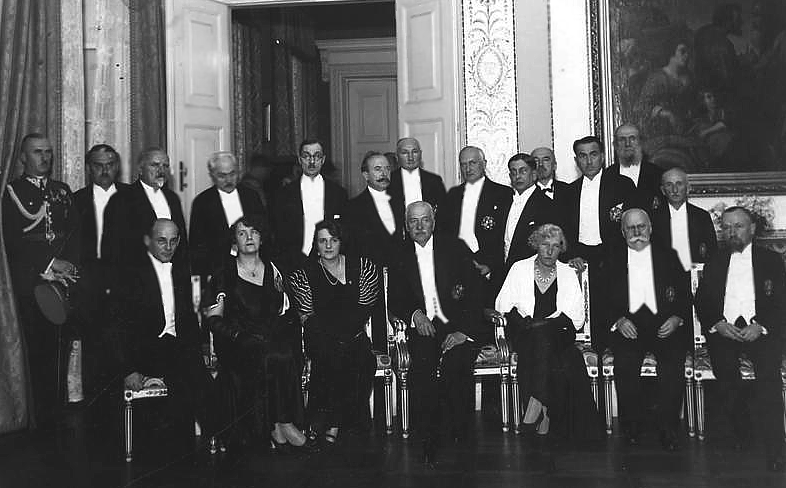
The inaugural session of the Polish Academy of Literature, 1933. Sitting from left to right: Prime Minister Janusz Jędrzejewicz, Zofia Nałkowska, Maria Mościcka, President Ignacy Mościcki, Maria Jędrzejewicz, Wacław Sieroszewski, Leopold Staff. Standing from left: Colonel Jan Głogowski, director Skowroński, Zenon Przesmycki, Wacław Berent, Piotr Choynowski, Juliusz Kleiner, Wincenty Rzymowski, Jerzy Szaniawski, Juliusz Kaden-Bandrowski, Karol Irzykowski, Tadeusz Żeleński, Tadeusz Zieliński, and Bolesław Leśmian

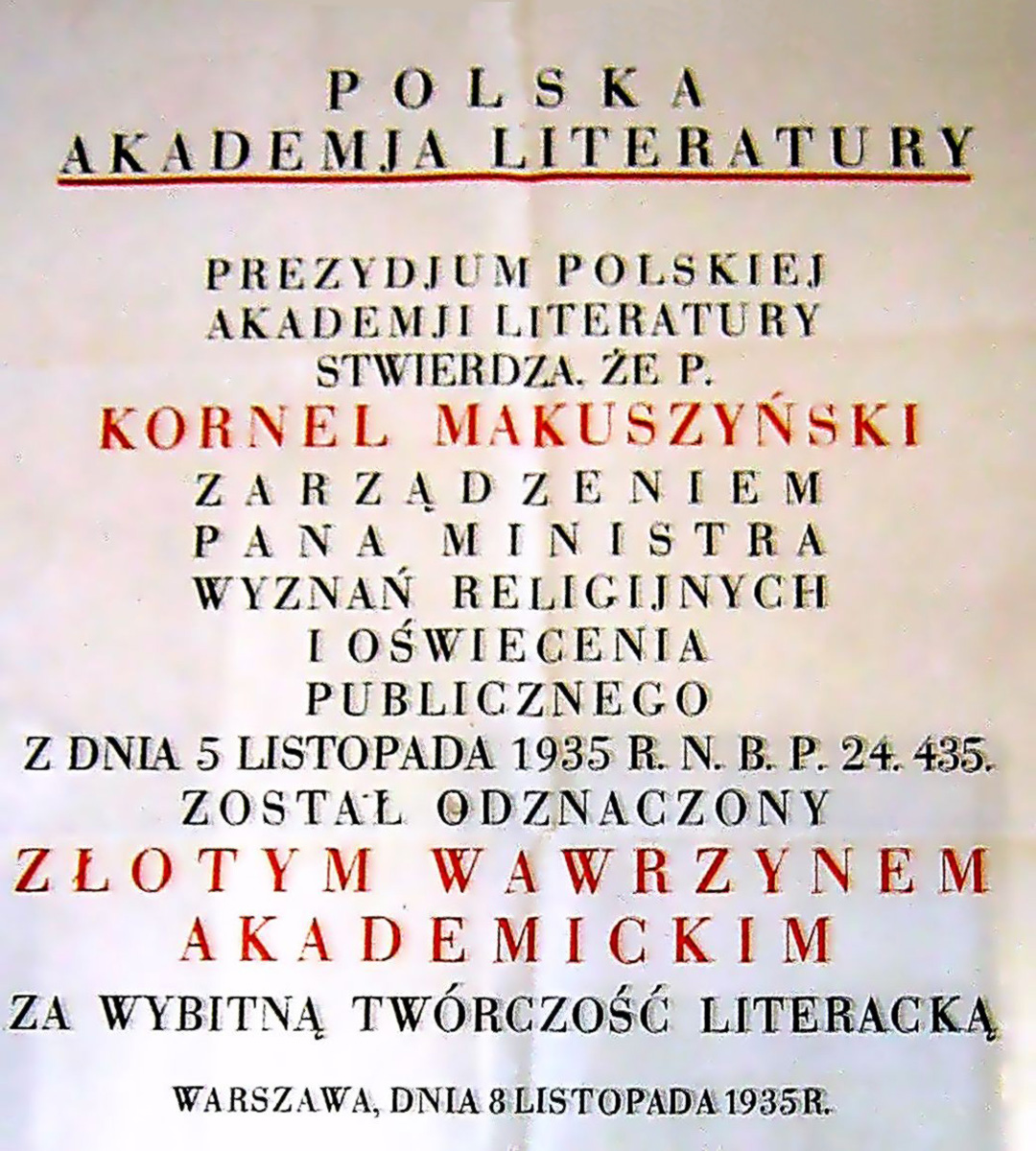
Diploma of the Polish Academy of Literature Golden laurel awarded to Kornel Makuszyński in 1935

The Polish Academy of Literature (Polish: Polska Akademia Literatury, PAL) was one of the most important state institutions of literary life in the Second Polish Republic, operating between 1933 and 1939 with the headquarters in Warsaw. It was founded by the decree of the Council of Ministers of the Republic (Rada Ministrów RP).

The academy was the highest opinion-forming authority in the country, in charge of all aspects of promoting and honoring the most outstanding contemporary achievements of Polish literature. According to its own statute, the main objective of the academy was to raise the quality level of Poland's publishing, while working in conjunction with the government efforts and NGO endeavors focused on the advancement of Polish culture and art in general. The century of foreign Partitions of Poland, ending in 1918, was marked by the forcible suppression of Polish education, language and religion under Prussian (and later German rule, see Kulturkampf), and outright Russification in the territories occupied by the Tsarist Empire, reaching its epitome under Otto von Bismarck on the one hand, and Nicholas II on the other. It resulted in staggering levels of illiteracy on Polish lands, as noted by Stefan Żeromski in 1923. PAL was called forth to reinforce the historic standards of quality, exalt the honor of Poland's literary tradition and explore the intricacies of her heritage. It was proposed for the first time by Żeromski in 1920 already, but accepted as an idea only nine years later (and five years after his death), in 1929.

== Organization and the awards for contributions to literature ==
The structure of the academy was modeled on the corresponding French Académie des Inscriptions et Belles-Lettres. It consisted of 15 members chosen for life, seven of whom were selected by the Minister of Religion and Public Education. The remaining eight were proposed by the members of the first group. Notably, socialist writer and Freemason, Andrzej Strug declined the offer, upset by voices of official criticism of the movement.

The academy awarded two highest national honors for contribution to the development of Polish literature: the Gold and the Silver Laurel (Złoty, and Srebrny Wawrzyn). Another prize, also widely regarded, was the Young Writer's Award, a door-opener for new and emerging talent. The honorary members included also the academy's main promoters: President of Poland Ignacy Mościcki and Marshal Józef Piłsudski.

Among the members of the academy were the luminaries of Poland's literary life including its own president Wacław Sieroszewski, vicepresident Leopold Staff, secretary general Juliusz Kaden-Bandrowski, and popular writers such as Wacław Berent, Piotr Choynowski, Zofia Nałkowska, Zenon Przesmycki, Karol Irzykowski, Juliusz Kleiner, Bolesław Leśmian, Karol Hubert Rostworowski, Wincenty Rzymowski, Tadeusz Boy-Żeleński, Jerzy Szaniawski, and Tadeusz Zieliński.

The composition changed after the death Choynowski (1935) and Leśmian (1937) and after the withdrawal from PAL by Rzymowski accused of plagiarism (1937), and by Rostworowski (1937) protesting against the change of government. The new members were soon appointed, including writers Ferdynand Goetel, Kornel Makuszyński, Jan Lorentowicz, and Kazimierz Wierzyński. The academy ceased to exist following the Nazi-Soviet invasion of Poland in 1939.

=== Epilogue ===
In 1947 following World War II, in the Soviet-controlled Polish People's Republic, there was a discussion among some communist writers about whether to reinstate the academy. The leading proponent of Polish Stalinism from Kuźnica, Jan Kott, summarized the subject in the following way: "The Academy is like the monarchy; if it has existed for some time, one can get used to it, just as one can get accustomed to progressive bulbar palsy. But to start it afresh – that leads to trouble."
