= Wacław Berent =

Polish novelist and translator

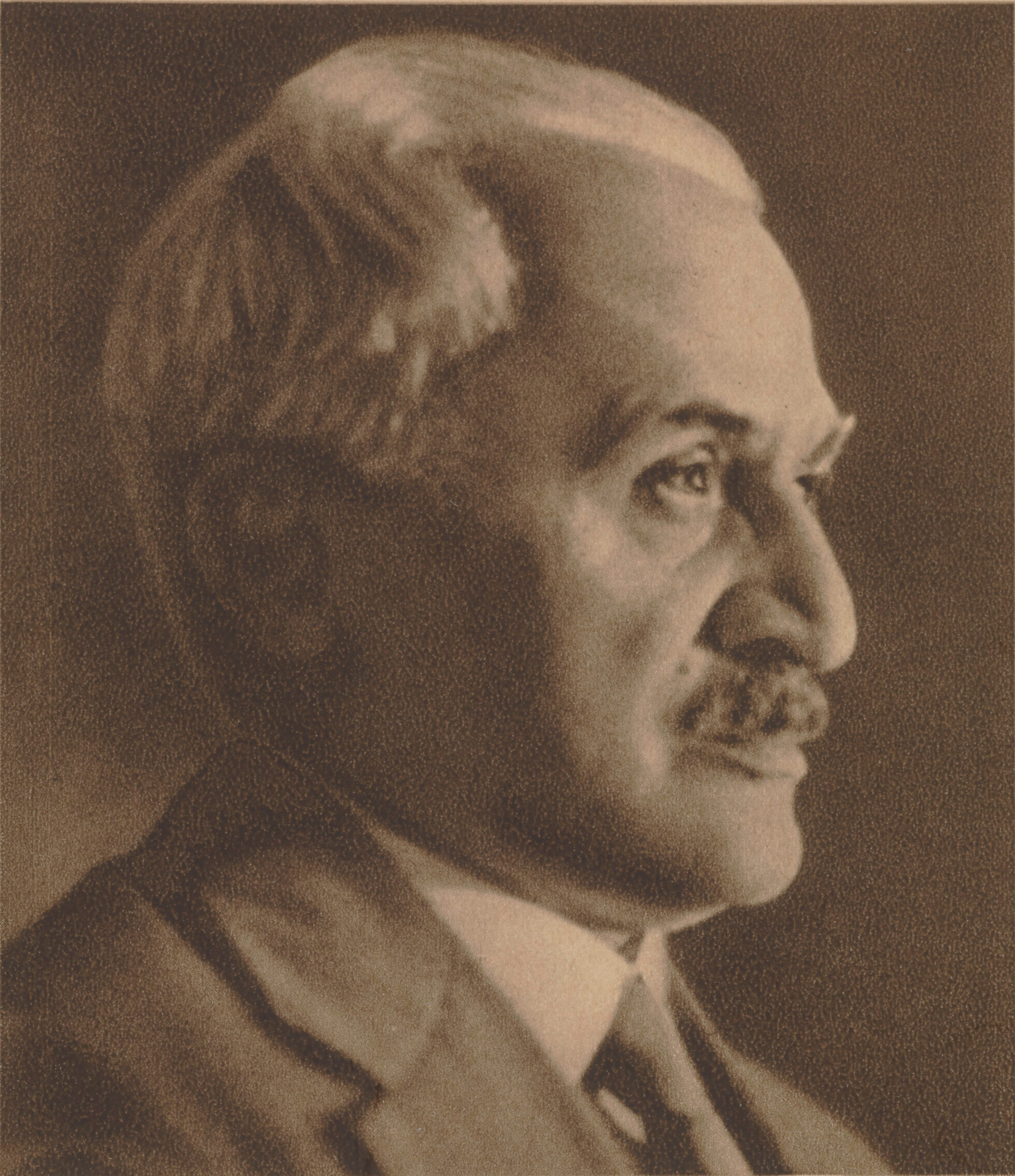
Wacław Berent

Wacław Berent (Warsaw, 28 September 1878 – 19 November or 22 November 1940, Warsaw) was a Polish novelist, essayist and literary translator from the Art Nouveau period, publishing under the pen names S.A.M. and Wł. Rawicz. He studied Natural Science in Kraków and Zurich, and obtained a PhD in Munich before returning to Warsaw and embarking on a literary career around the turn of the century. Having devoted himself to writing he was influenced by Nietzsche, whom he translated. Berent became a member of the prestigious Polish Academy of Literature (Polish: Polska Akademia Literatury) in 1933.

== Literary output ==
Berent translated into Polish Thus Spoke Zarathustra by the German philosopher Friedrich Nietzsche. Along with Władysław Reymont, he was a leading representative of the realist trend in the Young Poland movement (Polish: Młoda Polska). His main work, a social novel Żywe kamienie (Stones Alive), depicted the circumstances which threatened traditional moral values in the industrial era.

He was a critic of late nineteenth-century Positivist slogans, modernist Polish philosophy and European bohemianism, which postulated "art for art's sake". In his novel Ozimina (Winter Crop) he depicted the emergence of the Polish independence movement prior to the Revolution of 1905. He was an aesthetic opponent of Romanticism.

== Works ==
- Próchno (Rotten Wood, 1903)
- Ozimina (Winter Crop, 1911)
- Żywe kamienie (Living Stones, 1918)
- Nurt (Trend, 1934)
- Diogenes w kontuszu (Diogenes in a Kontusz, 1937)
- Zmierzch wodzów (The Dusk of the Commanders, 1939)
