= Juliusz Kleiner =

Polish historian and literary theorist

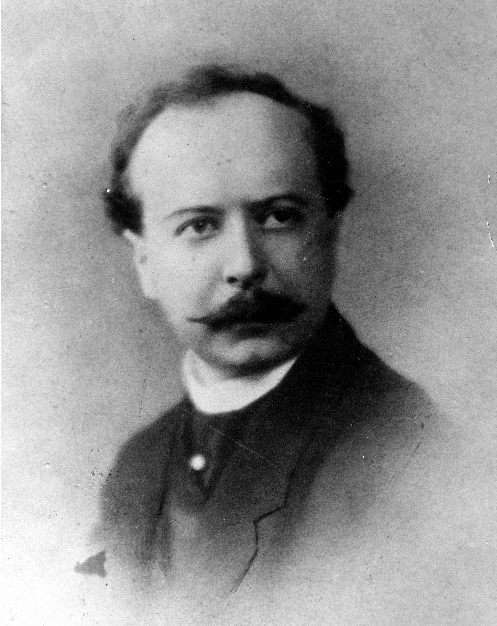
- Born: 24 April 1886; Lwów
- Died: March 23, 1957 (aged 70); Kraków

Juliusz Kleiner (April 24, 1886, Lwów – March 23, 1957, Kraków) was a Polish historian and literary theorist.

== Education and early life ==
Kleiner graduated from high school in Lwów and then studied Polish and German literature as well as philosophy at the University of Lwów. In 1908, Kleiner was awarded a doctorate in philosophy. In 1910 and 1911 he studied abroad in Germany and France.

== Working life ==
In 1912 he was habilitated at the University of Lwów. Between 1916 and 1920 he was a professor at University of Warsaw and after that at University of Lwów. Beginning in 1919 he was a member the Polish Academy of Sciences (PAU), from 1933 of the Polish Academy of Literature and from 1951 of Polish Academy of Sciences (PAN).

== Second World War ==
During the Soviet occupation of Lwów he retained his position at the University, teaching one of the few remaining courses in Polish. In 1940 he succeeded in advocating his best scientific pupil Stefania Skwarczyńska to be released from labour camp in Kazakhstan. Then during the Nazi occupation, Skwarczyńska hid him as "Jan Zalutyński" in the Teleżyński family (Wilkołaz in Lublin area) and later in the Żółtowski family (Milejów).

In 1940 and 1941, Juliusz Kleiner advocated for the release of a Polish woman who had been deported to a forced labour camp in Kazakhstan.

After the war he settled in Lublin. Between 1944 and 1947 at the Catholic University of Lublin (now "John Paul II Catholic University of Lublin"). In 1947 he moved to Kraków and took a position at the Jagiellonian University.

== Published works ==
- "On Konrad Wallenrod", Twórczość, No. 4, 1945
- Zarys Dziejów Literatury Polskiej 1963
- Zarys Dziejow Literatury Polskiej Jezyka Polskiego Tom Drugi Wydanie II co-author Aleksander Bruckner, 1947
- Sentymentalizm I Preromantyzm
- Pojęcie idei u Berkeleya [The Concept of Idea in Berkeley] (in Polish). Lwów: Nakładem Polskiego Towarzystwa we Lwowie. 1910.
