= Samuel Hirszenberg =

Polish-Jewish Realist and later Symbolist painter (1865-1908)

Samuel (Szmul) Hirszenberg
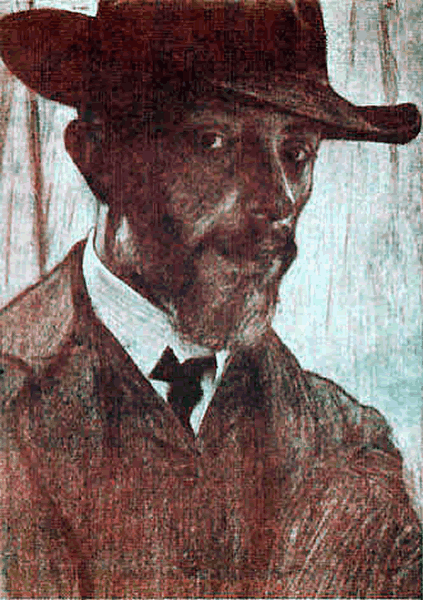
- Self-Portrait, 1907
- Born: February 22, 1865; Łódź, Russian Empire
- Died: September 15, 1908 (aged 43); Jerusalem, Ottoman Empire
- Education: Jan Matejko Academy of Fine Arts; Academy of Fine Arts, Munich; Académie Colarossi
- Known for: Painting
- Notable work: The Wandering Jew, Exile, The Sabbath Rest, The Eternal Jew
- Movement: Realism

Samuel Hirszenberg (also Schmul Hirschenberg; February 22, 1865 – September 15, 1908) was a Polish-Jewish realist and later symbolist painter active in the late 19th and early 20th century.

== Biography ==
Szmul (Samuel) Hirszenberg was born in Polish Łódź in 1865. He was the eldest son of a weaving mill worker. Against the will of his father, but thanks to the financial assistance of a doctor, he chose to be an artist. At the age of 15 he began his studies at the Academy of Fine Arts in Kraków, where he was heavily influenced by the realistic painting of Jan Matejko.

After two years of training in Kraków, he continued his studies from 1885 until 1889 at the Royal Academy of Arts in Munich.

== Art career ==
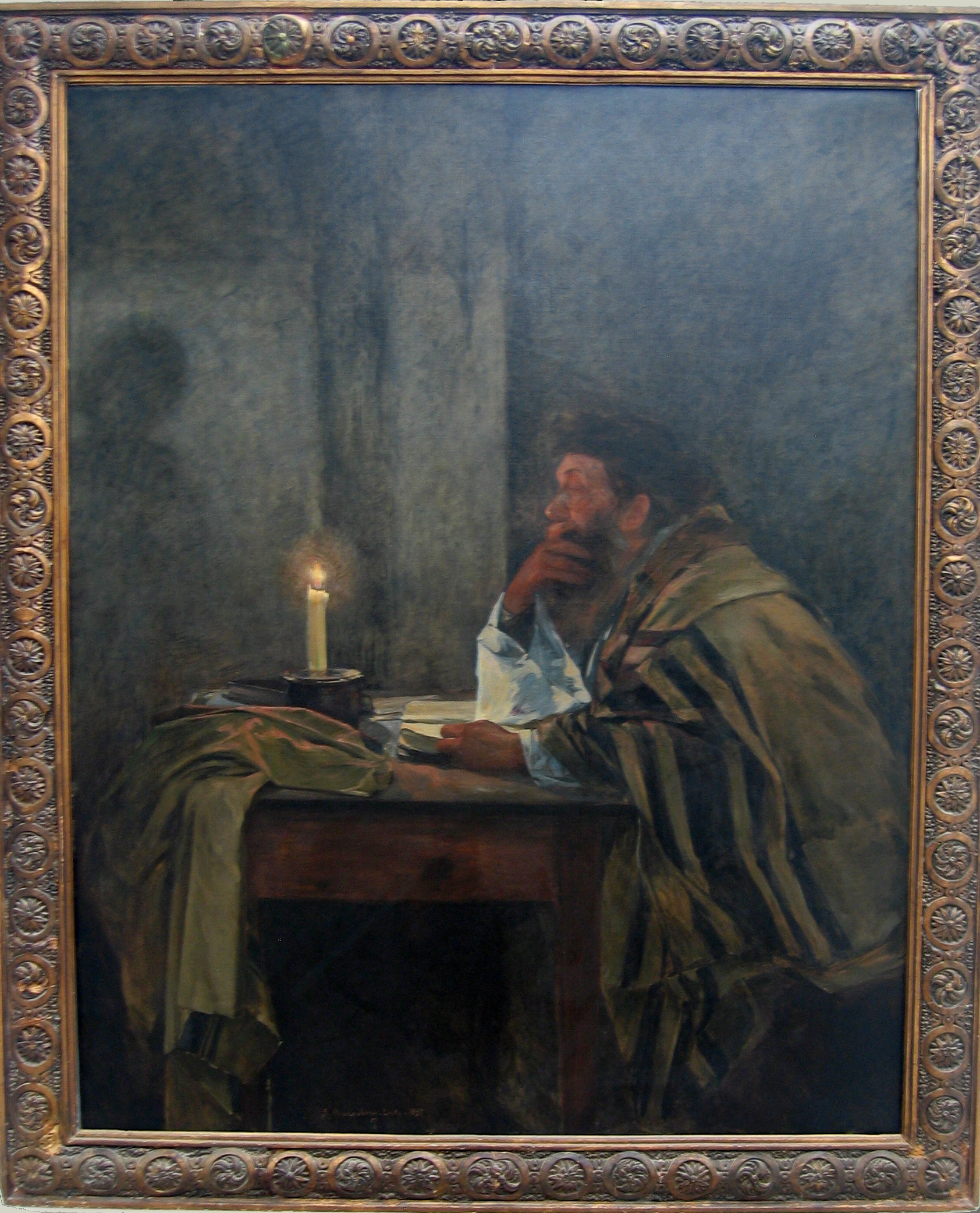
The Last Prayer, Hirszenberg, Ein Harod

His first major work to attract attention was Yeshiva (1887). After an exhibition at the Kunstverein Munich (1889), he showed at the art exhibition in Paris and was awarded a silver medal. In Paris, he completed his artistic training at the Académie Colarossi.

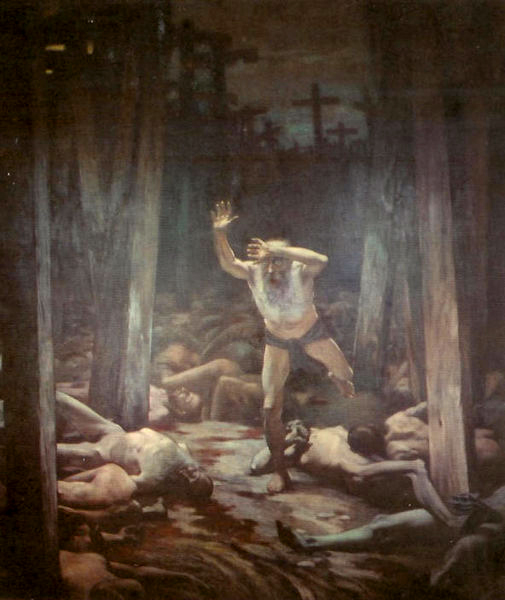
The Wandering Jew (1899), Israel Museum

In 1891, Hirszenberg returned to Poland. In 1893 he resettled in his hometown of Łódź. While the images of the early years, like the paintings Talmudic Studies, Sabbathnachmittag, Uriel Acosta, and The Jewish cemetery show a certain kinship with the Jewish genre painting by Leopold Horowitz, Isidor Kaufmann, and Maurycy Gottlieb, his later works can be rather assigned to the symbolism. Themes of the "tearful" Jewish history came to the fore. Noteworthy are the three most famous pictures of this period: The Wandering Jew (1899), Exile (1904), and Czarny Sztandar / Black Banner (1905).

In 1900, after working on a large painting, The Eternal Jew, for over four years, it was exhibited in the Paris Salon. Disappointed by the poor response in Paris Munich and Berlin, he retired for health reasons.

In 1901, he went for a year on a trip to Italy. In 1904, Hirszenberg moved to Kraków. In 1907, he immigrated to Palestine and began to work as a lecturer at the newly founded Bezalel School in Jerusalem, headed by Boris Schatz. After a short and intense creative period, he died in 1908 in Jerusalem.

== Selected paintings ==
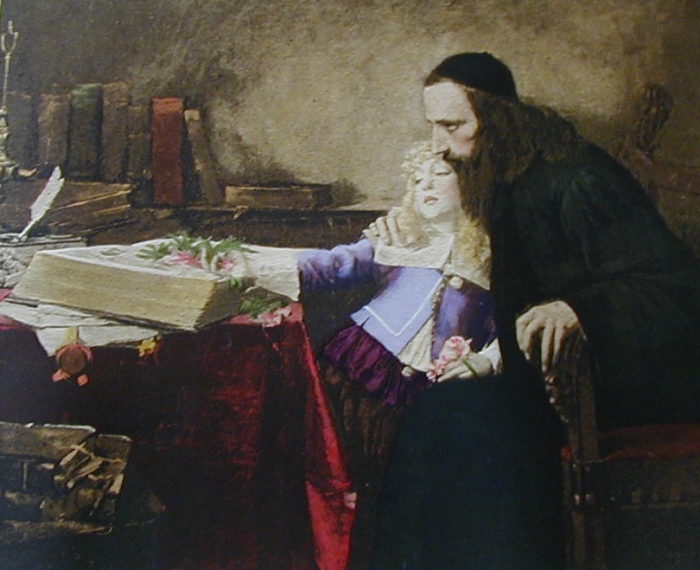
Uriel da Costa teaching the young Spinoza (1901)

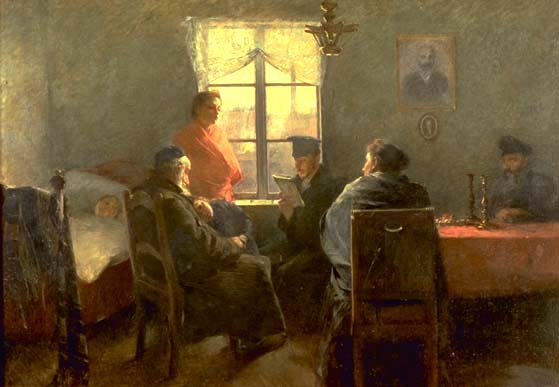
The Sabbath Rest (1894)

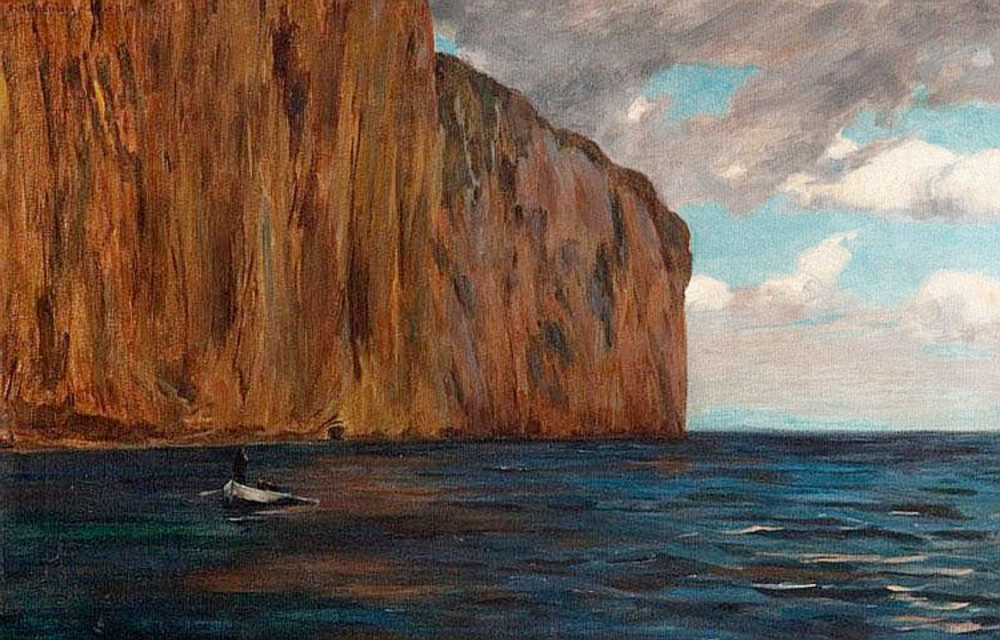
Capri (1901)

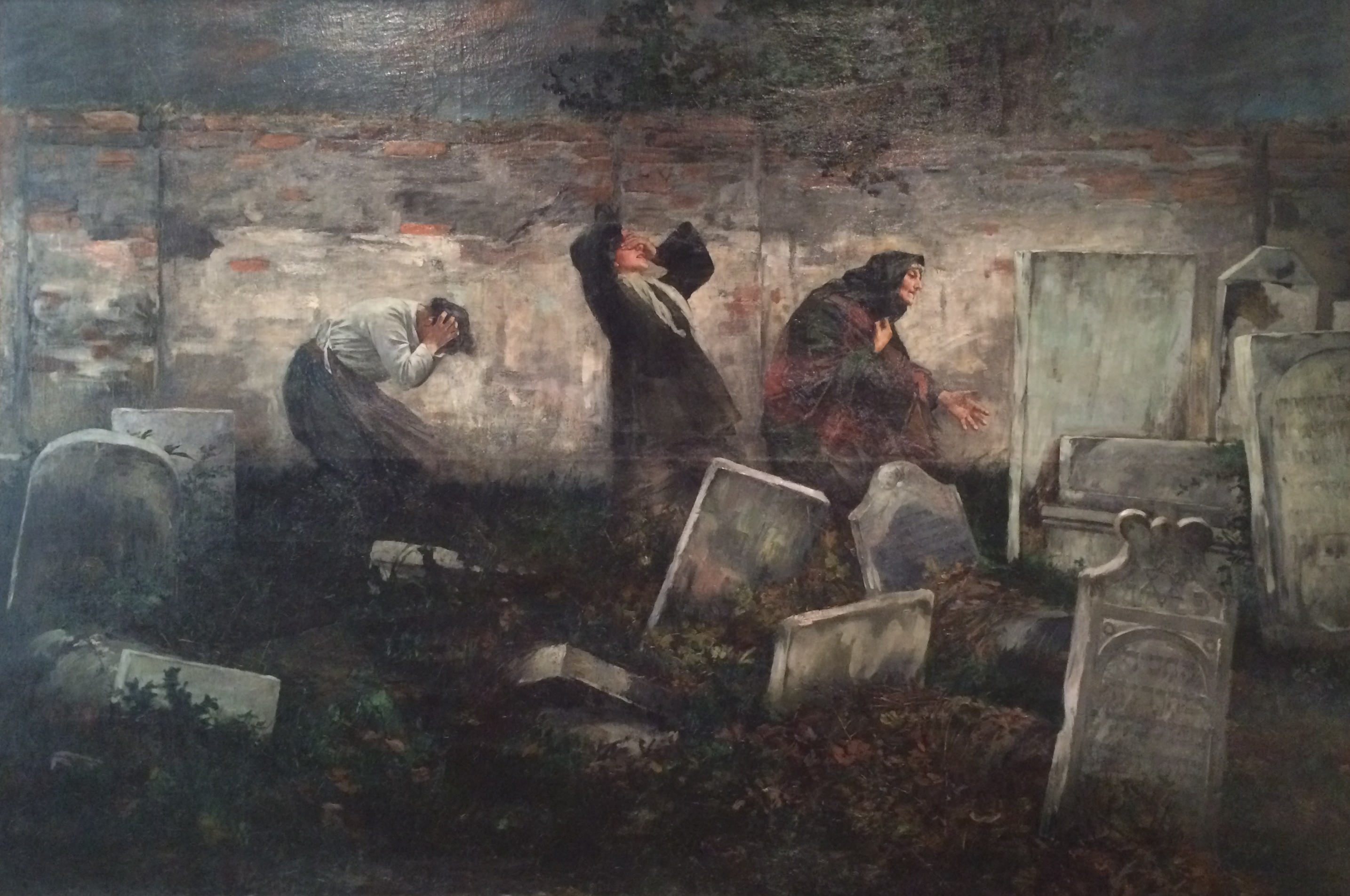
Jewish Cemetery (1892), Musée d'Art et d'Histoire du Judaïsme

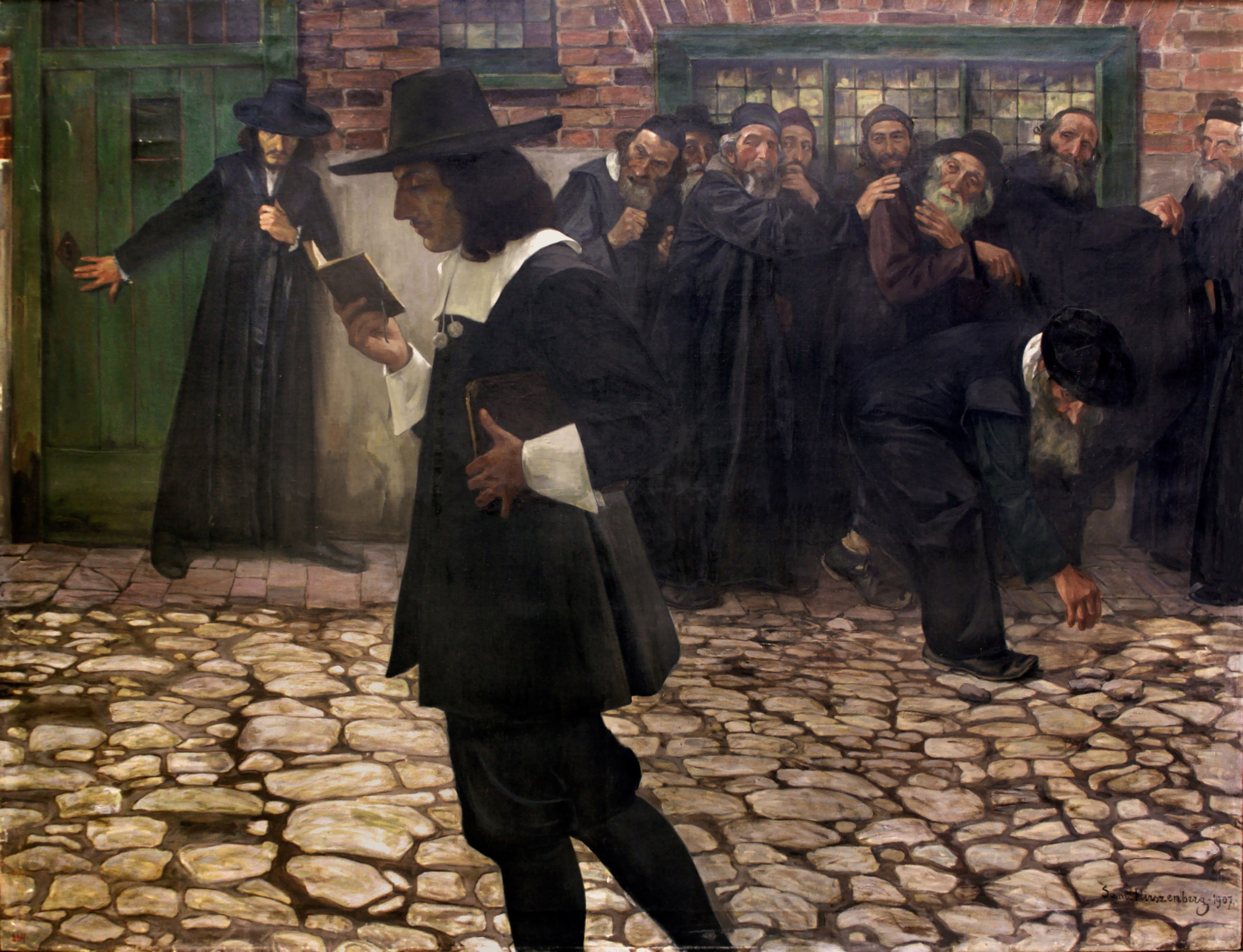
Spinoza, Excommunicated

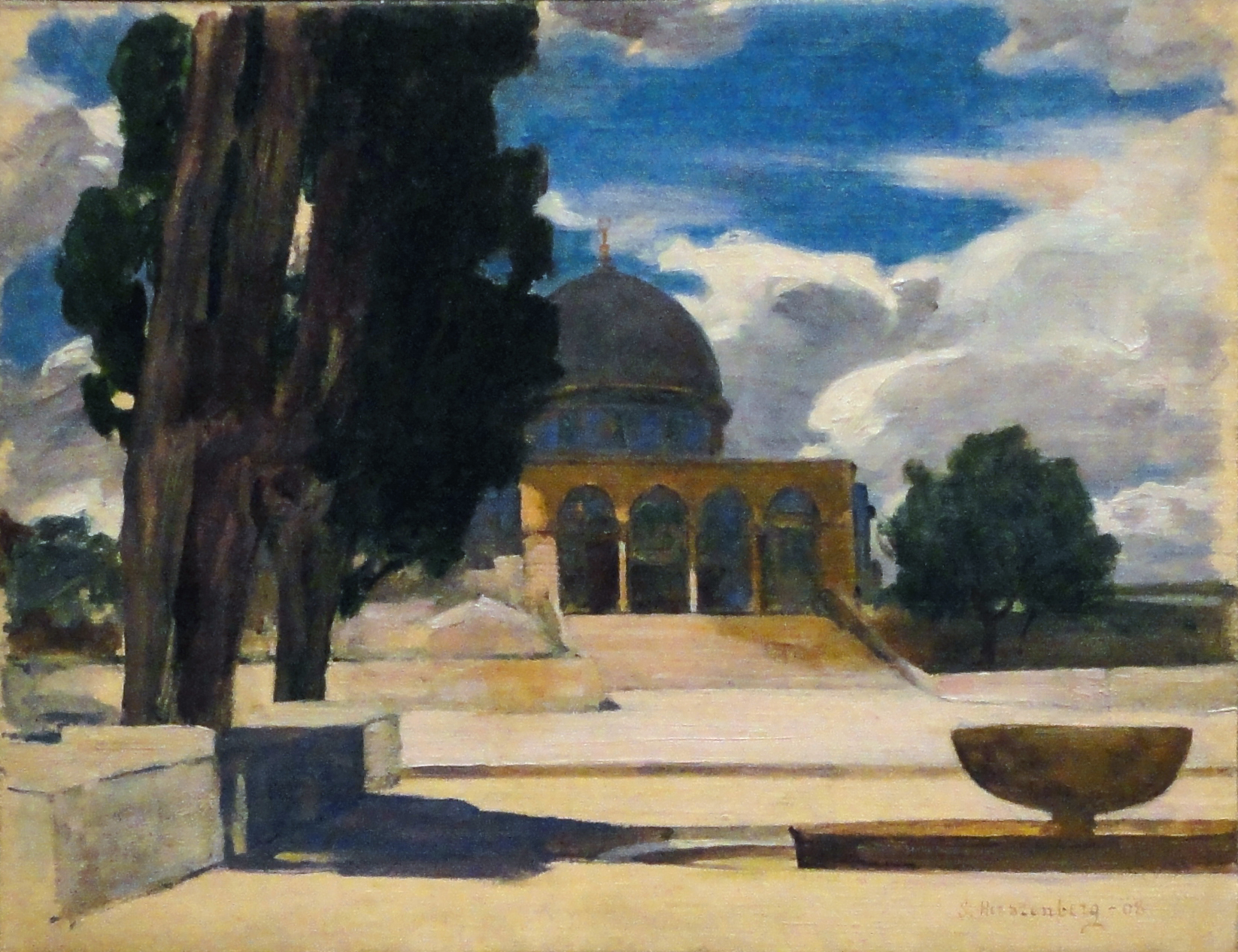
Dome of the Rock, Tel Aviv Museum of Art, 1908

== See also ==
- Israeli art
- Maurycy Trębacz (1861–1941), Polish-Jewish painter.
