= Piotr Choynowski =

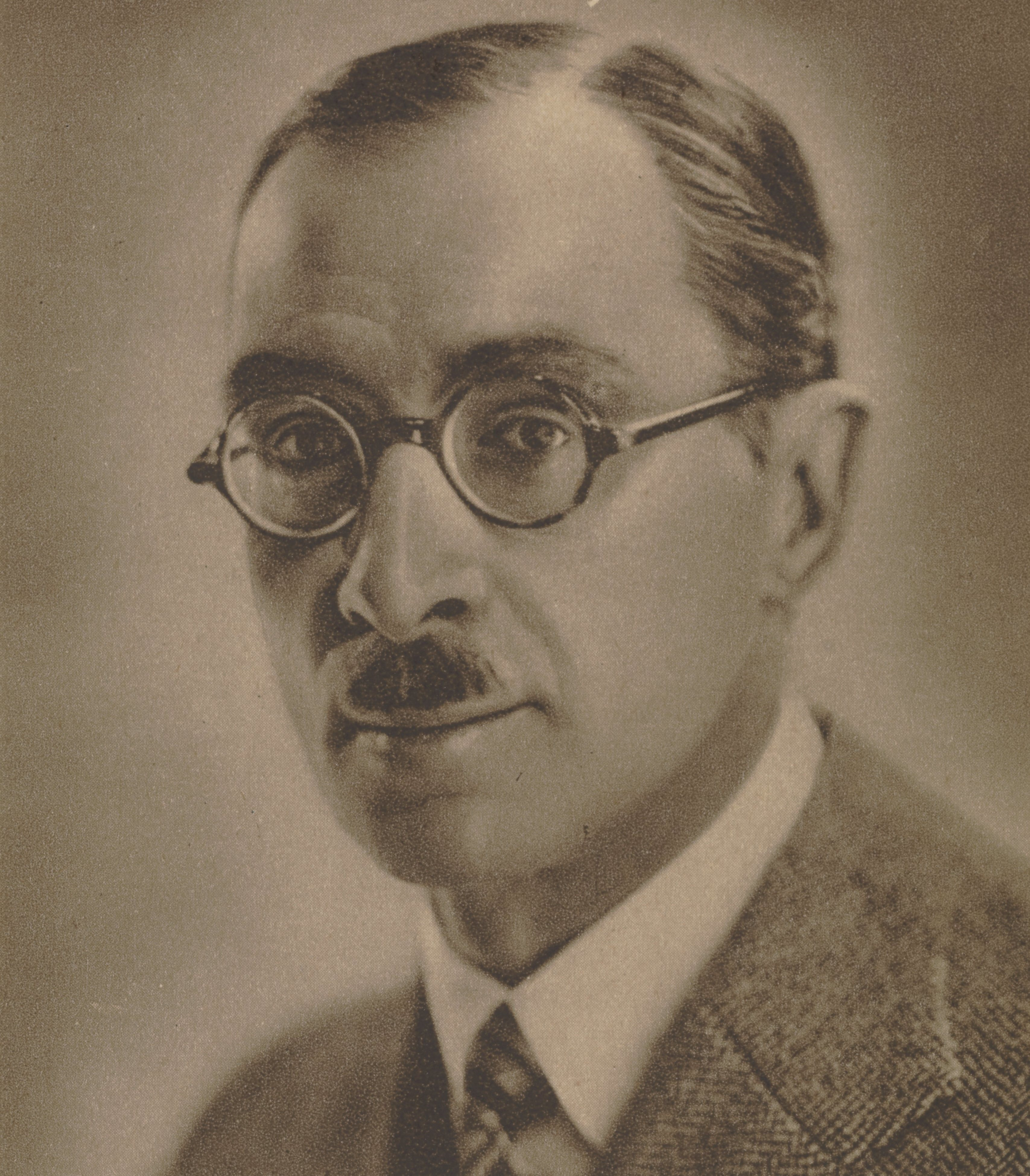
Piotr Choynowski

Piotr Choynowski (Warsaw, 27 August 1885 – 25 November 1935, Otwock) was a Polish writer, novelist and translator; an elected member of the prestigious Polish Academy of Literature from 1933.

Choynowski studied chemistry originally, in Warsaw and in Lwów (now Lviv), then from 1908, history and philosophy in Zurich and at the Jagiellonian University in Kraków. In 1914 during World War I he joined the Polish Legions (Legiony Polskie) to fight for Poland's independence, but his poor health forced him to quit. Since 1916 Choynowski lived in Warsaw. He became the editor-in-chief of Tygodnik Ilustrowany with which he worked until 1930. From 1933 he served as member of the Academy (Polska Akademia Literatury).

Choynowski was an accomplished novelist writing in the realist style based on authenticism and truthfulness of observation. In his prose, he focused on the life of Polish upper classes, inspired by writings of Henryk Sienkiewicz. One of his most notable novels, devoted to Warsaw in the year 1920, was Dom w śródmieściu (A House Downtown, 1924). He also translated into Polish The Sorrows of Young Werther by Johann Wolfgang Goethe among other works.

Choynowski was nearly forgotten in communist Poland under the Soviet domination. In 1953, during Polish Stalinism one of his stage plays was revived temporarily called Ruchome piaski (Shifting Sands, from 1913). In 1988 his novel W młodych oczach (In the Young Eyes, 1933) was reprinted, and in 1991 another one, called Młodość, miłość, awantura (Youth, Love and Disturbance, from 1926).

== Selected works ==
- Ruchome piaski (Shifting Sands, 1913), play
- Kuźnia (The Forge, 1919), novel
- Kij w mrowisku (Stick in an Anthill, 1921), collection of novels
- Dom w śródmieściu (A House Downtown, 1924), novel
- Młodość, miłość, awantura (Youth, Love and Disturbance, 1926), novel
- O pięciu panach Suleżyckich (On the Five Sirs Suleżyckis, 1928), collection of novels
- W młodych oczach (In the Young Eyes, 1933), novel
- Opowiadania szlacheckie (Nobility Stories, 1937), collection of novels

== Bibliography ==
- K. Czachowski, Żywioł ujarzmiony ("Tygodnik Ilustrowany" 1935, nr 49)
- M. Kurowski, O pisarstwie P. Ch. ("Tygodnik Powszechny" 1953, nr. 15)
- J. Nowakowski, Piotr Choynowski. Zarys monograficzny (Rzeszów 1972)
- J. Koprowski, Sztuka opowiadania ("Argumenty" 1979, nr 7)
