= Maurycy Trębacz =

Jewish-polish painter

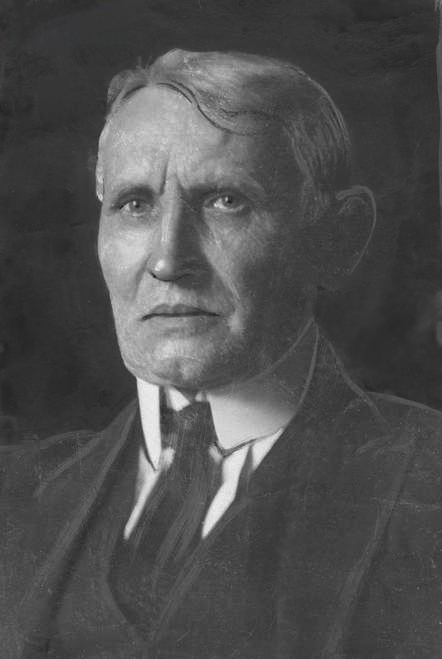
- 1932 photograph
- Born: Maurycy (Mojżesz) Trębacz; May 3, 1861; Warsaw, Poland
- Died: January 29, 1941 (aged 79); Łódź, Wartheland, German-occupied Poland
- Known for: Painting and illustration
- Movement: Realism

Maurycy Trębacz (May 3, 1861 – January 29, 1941) was one of the most popular Jewish painters in Poland in the late 19th and early 20th century. Many of his paintings were lost in the Holocaust, but a representative selection of his artwork survived. Trębacz died of starvation in the Litzmannstadt Ghetto during the Nazi German occupation of Poland.

Maurycy Trębacz, along with Samuel Hirszenberg, Jakub Weinles, and Leopold Pilichowski, belonged to the first generation of Jewish artists in Poland who broke away from the religious prohibition on portraying a human figure (see below). The studies show his mastery of painting, his own unique style and great imagination. Trębacz was noted within the European art-world as a master portrait and landscape painter, but above all he was also a rare chronicler of the contemporary Jewish life, depicting a world that is now lost. His popular subjects included praying Rabbis, old men, street and Jewish domestic scenes, and genre painting depicting the everyday side of life. His psychological portraits of Jews earned him the greatest popularity and critical acclaim, and influenced the work of other Jewish painters in Poland. Notably, Trębacz's oil painting "The Good Samaritan", reportedly stolen in 1904 at the World's Fair, was recently sold at auction at Sotheby's.

== Life ==
Born in 1861 in Warsaw, the son of David Trębacz, a house painter, Maurycy (Mojżesz) at the age of 16 years was admitted to the school of drawing by professor Wojciech Gerson and Aleksander Kamiński. Three years later, with the support of Leopold Horowitz, he received a scholarship sponsored by lawyer Stanisław Rotwand, and moved to Kraków where he enrolled in the Academy of Fine Arts in the studios of Jan Matejko, Leopold Loeffler and Władysław Łuszczkiewicz.

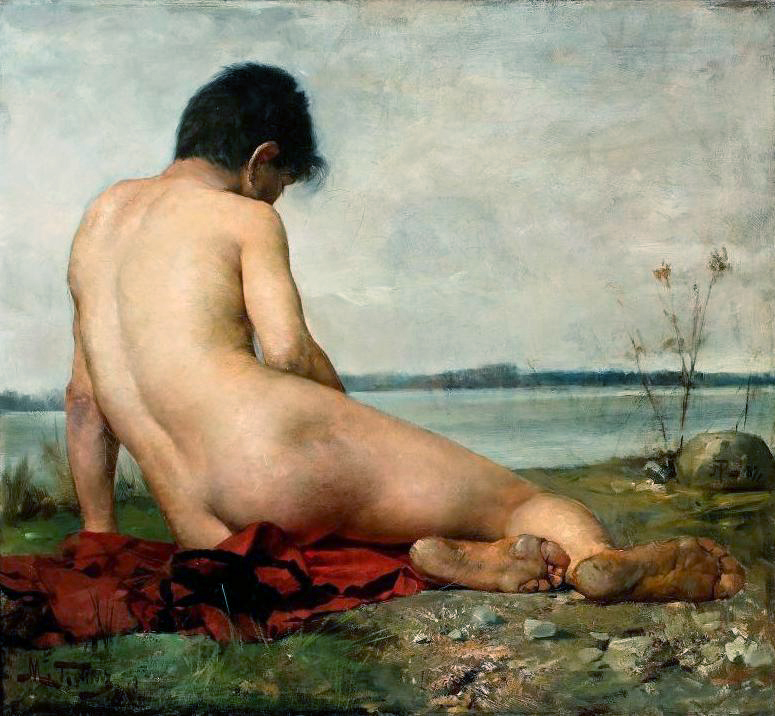
Reclining male nude, 1887. National Museum, Warsaw

From 1882, he studied at the Academy of Fine Arts in Munich with Sandor Wagner (until 1884) and received the grand silver medal there at the completion of his studies for the work "Martyrdom". Between 1889 and 1890, he studied in Paris at the Académie Colarossi. He lived and worked in Munich for 4 years before returning to Warsaw. Over time, Trębacz worked in Lviv and Drohobych, and eventually moved permanently to Łódź, where he founded and ran a private art school until September 1939. He is often criticized for giving in to popular demand later on in his career. Pressured by financial sponsors, he began to produce sentimental theme portraits pertaining to the bucolic life of country folk.

Trębacz made his successful artistic début twice, first at the Munich Kunstverein, and then at the Krywult Salon in Warsaw as a 23-year-old painter. His other big success was the participation of painting "Good Samaritan" (1886, pictured) in a Kunstverein exhibition in Munich as well as at the I National Art Exhibition in Kraków and in Warsaw at the Zachęta Society for the Promotion of Fine Arts. The painting was also awarded a gold medal at the Universal World Exposition in Chicago. Subsequently, Trębacz also received a bronze medal at the Paris Universal World Exposition of 1889.

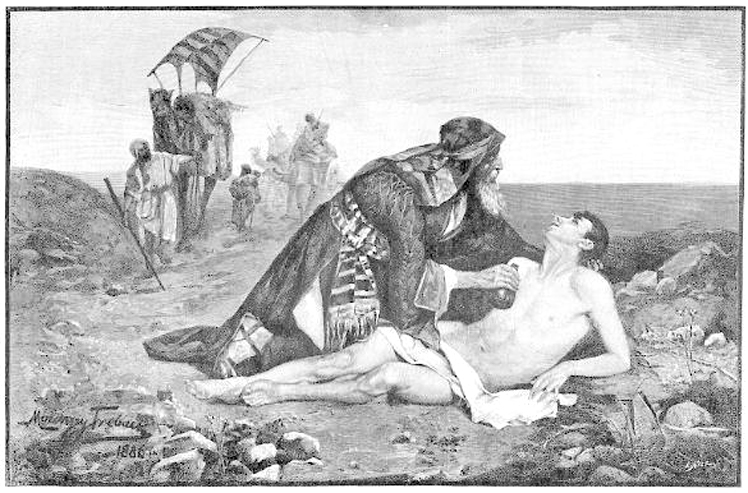
"Good Samaritan" (1886), book engraving from painting by Maurycy Trębacz, Warsaw

Maurycy Trębacz died of hunger in the Łódź Ghetto during the Holocaust in occupied Poland, and is buried at the Bracka Street Cemetery in Łódź, grave #490. His wife Pola (Perla) also died in the ghetto in 1941, at the age of 79. They had three children, Edward, Zofia and Bronisław. Until the occupation of Lodz by the Wehrmacht and establishment of the Ghetto, he lived with his family in Wolczanska 140. In the ghetto, he lived in Limanowskiego 19 street.

Soon after the war ended, some 70 paintings of Maurycy Trębacz (along with works of Izrael Lejzorowicz, Amos Szwarc, Mendel Grosman and others, wrote Dr. Cieślińska-Lobkowicz) (Note: Nawojka Cieślińska-Lobkowicz in her PhD-thesis made available by Art Antiquity and Law (Vol. XIV, Issue 2) from June 2009, does not cite whether the 70 paintings mentioned (smuggled out by Zonabend from postwar Poland), were produced by just one artist or more, considering their exceptional number. See also: The Polish official decree of 1 Mar. 1946 on registration and prohibition of taking abroad artworks and objects of artistic, historical or cultural value.) were located in Poland by Nachman Zonabend on behalf of the Jewish Cultural Reconstruction (JCR) and the Jewish Restitution Successor Organization (JRSO) from the United States. Most were taken out of the country by Zonabend in 1947 against the official policy on protecting the national heritage and then split between the YIVO Institute of New York and Yad Vashem. The illegal removal of the collection was criticized by the Jewish press not only in communist Poland but also in Canada and France.
