= Tadeusz Stefan Zieliński =

Polish philologist (1859–1944)

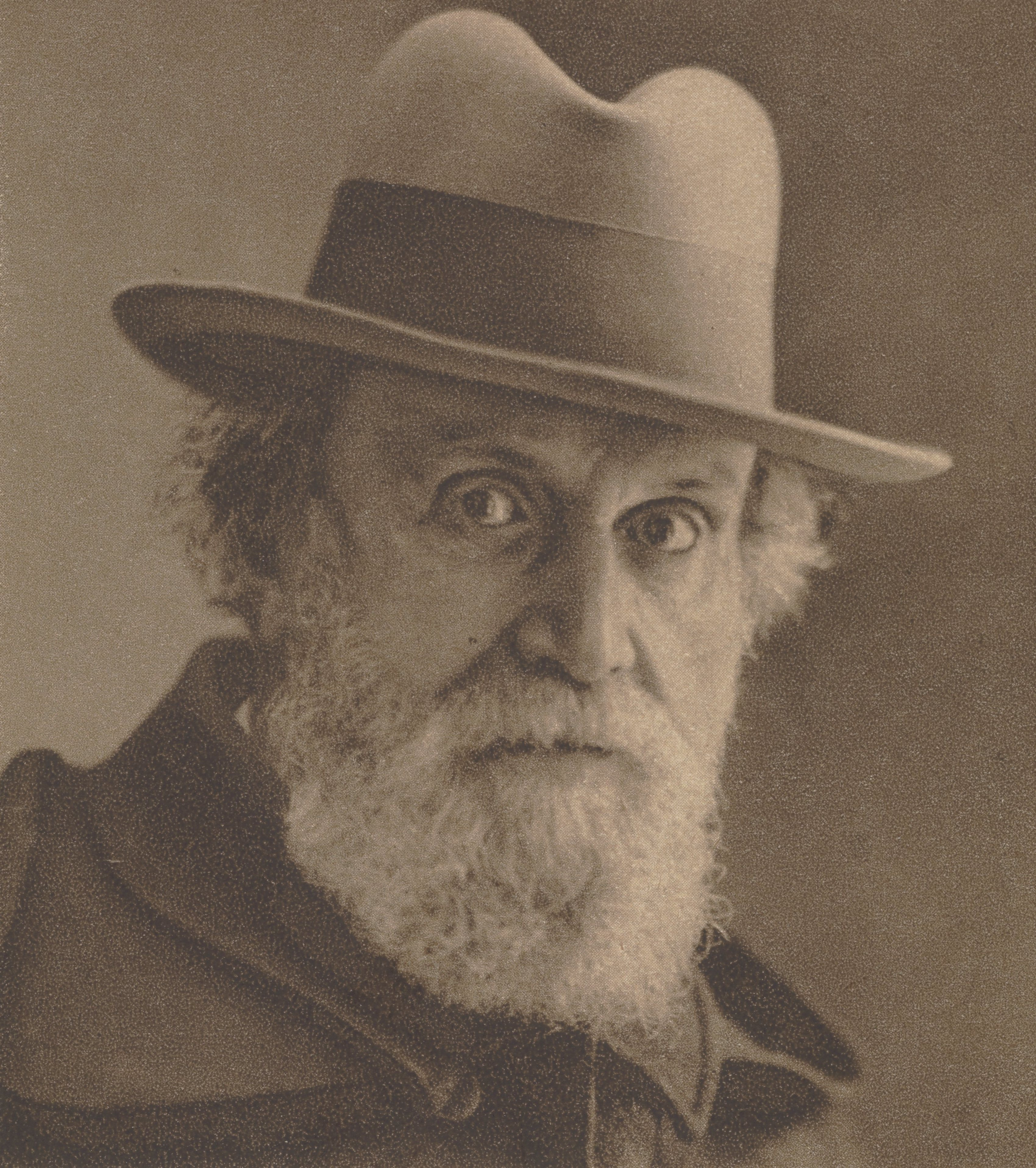
- Zieliński in 1933
- Born: September 14, 1859; Skrzypczyńce, Kiev Governorate, Russian Empire
- Died: May 8, 1944 (aged 84); Schondorf am Ammersee, Bavaria, Nazi Germany

Tadeusz Stefan Zieliński (Polish: [taˈdɛ.uʐ ʑɛˈlij̃skʲi]; Russian: Фадде́й Фра́нцевич Зели́нский, romanized: Faddéy Frántsevich Zelínskiy; (Note: In this name that follows East Slavic naming customs, the patronymic is Frantsevich and the family name is Zelinskiy.) September 14, 1859 – May 8, 1944) was a Polish classical philologist, historian, and translator of Sophocles, Euripides and other classical authors into Russian. His most well-known works are Die Gliederung der altattischen Komoedie, Tragodumenon libri tres, and Iresione, the last of which is a collection of essays.

== Life and career ==
He was born on 14 September 1859 in Skrzypczyńce, near Uman in Kiev Governorate of the Russian Empire (present-day Ukraine) to father Franciszek and mother Ludwika (née Grudzińska), both of them of Polish descent. Between 1869 and 1876, he attended secondary school in Saint Petersburg and subsequently in the years 1876–1881 he studied in Leipzig, Munich and Vienna. In 1880 he earned his doctorate from the University of Leipzig for his dissertation, Die Gliederung der altattischen Komoedie. He was author of works on the history of ancient Greek culture and religion, classical education, and popularization of classical studies (published largely in Russian and German).

In 1884 he became a professor at the University of St. Petersburg, and following Polish independence he held the chair of Classical Studies at Warsaw University for 17 years (1922–1939) during the interwar period. He was the recipient of honorary doctorates from the Jagiellonian University, Kraków (1930), and twelve western European universities. Between 1933 and 1939 Zieliński was a member of the prestigious Polish Academy of Literature.

His daughter became the wife of Prof. Vladimir Beneshevich, executed by the Soviet regime in 1938. Adrian Piotrovsky, his natural son, was arrested by the NKVD in November 1937 and executed.

After the outbreak of World War II, Zieliński left Poland to live with his son in Bavaria, where he lived until his death in 1944 after completing Religions of the Ancient World, which he considered to be his magnum opus.

== Scholarly work ==
Although Zieliński was active in many areas of classical scholarship, one of the studies for which he is best known in the West is his investigation of the prose rhythm of Cicero, published in 1904, which is still often referred to today. (See Clausula (rhetoric)). He was also an early mentor to Mikhail Bakhtin. Zieliński's concept of pliaska, in which logocentricism is challenged by incorporating gesture and dance into speech, is referenced in Bakhtin's communication theories that emphasize group participation in the interpretation of meaning between self and other.

His work Tragodumena: De trimetri Euripidei evolutione is a primary reference work for chronology, style, and resolution within Euripides' individual plays as well as across Euripides' body of work, and employs an early narratological methodology.

Zieliński's defense of the significance of classical antiquity in education in a series of lectures in 1903 resulted in the publication of "Our Debt to Antiquity" (in Russian: "Drevnij mir i my") in 1905. In this work, Zieliński argues for a classically-influenced education's compatibility with the natural sciences and Charles Darwin's theory of evolution. By 1911, the work was translated into French, English, Czech, and Italian, and its German translation appeared in the third edition.

== Works ==
- Cicero im Wandel der Jahrhunderte. (Leipzig 1897, 2nd ed. 1908)
- Das Clauselgesetz in Ciceros Reden. Grundzüge einer oratorischen Rhythmik (1904)
- Der Constructive Rhythmus in Ciceros Reden. Der oratorischen Rhythmik zweiter Teil (1913)
- Rzym i jego religia (1920, Polish) OCLC 119328185
- Chrześcijaństwo starożytne a filozofia rzymska (1921, Polish)
- Grecja. Budownictwo, plastyka, krajobraz (1923, Polish)
- Literatura starożytnej Grecji epoki niepodległości (1923, Polish)
- Rozwój moralności w świecie starożytnym od Homera do czasów Chrystusa (1927, Polish)
- Filheleńskie poematy Byrona (1928, Polish)
- Kleopatra (1929, Polish)
- Zieliński, Tadeusz. "Homeric psychology" (PDF).
- Zieliński, Tadeusz (1971) [1909]. Our debt to antiquity. Port Washington, NY: Kennikat Press. ISBN 978-0-8046-1205-0. LCCN 75113317. OCLC 109089.
- Zielinski, Thaddeus (1970) [1926]. The Religion of Ancient Greece: An Outline [from original in Polish: Religya starożytnej Grecji]. Translation by Noyes, George Rapall. Freeport, NY: Books for Libraries Press. ISBN 978-0-8369-5222-3. LCCN 76107838. OCLC 61443. OCLC-number for the translated edition: OCLC 753279017
