= Juliusz Kaden-Bandrowski =

Polish journalist and novelist

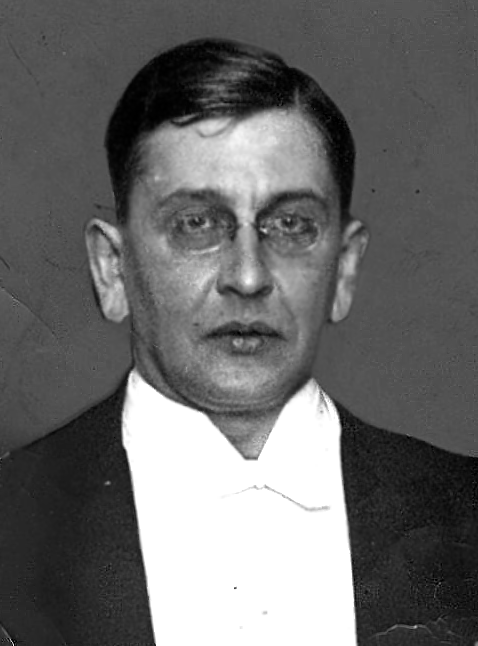
- Born: 24 February 1885; Rzeszów
- Died: 8 August 1944 (aged 59)

Juliusz Kaden-Bandrowski (Polish: [ˈjuljuʂ ˌkadɛm banˈdrɔfskʲi]; 24 February 1885 – 8 August 1944) was a Polish journalist and novelist. Between 1933 and 1939 he was a secretary general of the Polish Academy of Literature (Polska Akademia Literatury) in the Second Polish Republic.

== Life ==
Born in Rzeszów, Juliusz Kazimierz Kaden-Bandrowski studied piano at conservatories in Lwów, Kraków and Leipzig. While studying at Brussels, he switched his interests to philosophy. During World War I, he served as aide to Józef Piłsudski and as chronicler to the First Brigade of the Polish Legions.

In 1907 he had begun working as a correspondent for the Polish press. After World War I, he associated himself with the Skamander group of Polish experimental poets founded in 1918, and in 1933 joined the Polish Academy of Literature. During World War II, Kaden-Bandrowski declined to leave German-occupied Warsaw, to which he had moved during the Interbellum. He participated in underground teaching and gave music lessons. He was arrested and interrogated by the Gestapo. He died on 8 August 1944 in Warsaw, a week into the Warsaw Uprising.

His novels show insights and fidelity to facts; behaviorist and expressionist elements; and combinations of different styles and literary techniques.

== Family ==
Kaden-Bandrowski was the son of Juliusz Marian Bandrowski and his wife, Helena, née Kaden. Juliusz's brother was Jerzy Bandrowski (1883–1940), a journalist, novelist and translator from English to Polish.

He was a member of the Polish Reformed Church. By his wife, Romana, née Szpak (1882–1962; she had a son, Kazimierz Lewiński, an engineer who graduated from the Paris Polytechnique, from her first marriage), Kaden-Bandrowski had twin sons: Andrzej (1920–43), a Home Army second lieutenant who died in action in Warsaw in June 1943; and Paweł (1920–44), a Home Army lieutenant who fought in the Warsaw Uprising and died in the Czerniaków neighborhood of Warsaw's Mokotów district on 15 September 1944.

Juliusz Kazimierz Kaden-Bandrowski and his sons are interred at Warsaw's Protestant Reformed Cemetery.

== Bibliography ==
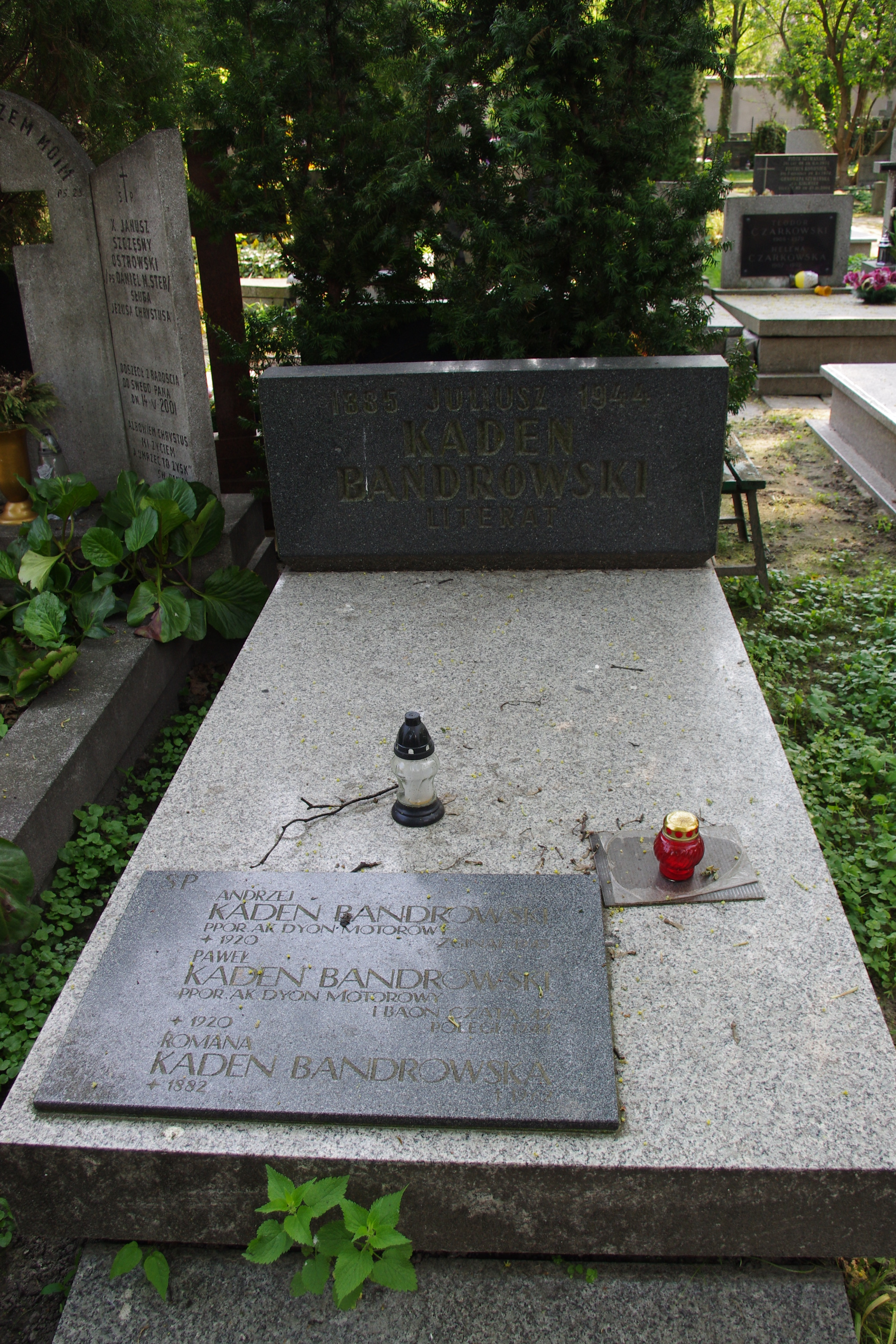
Grave of Juliusz Kaden-Bandrowski, his wife Romana, and their two sons at the Protestant Reformed Cemetery, Warsaw

- 1911: Niezguła (The Lubber)
- 1913: Proch (Dust)
- 1915: Piłsudczycy (The Piłsudskiites); Iskry (Sparks)
- 1916: Mogiły (Tombs)
- 1919: Łuk (The Bow)
- 1922: Generał Barcz (General Barcz)
- 1924: Przymierze serc (Alliance of Hearts)
- 1925: Wakacje moich dzieci (My Children's Vacation)
- 1928: Czarne skrzydła (Black Wings)
- 1932: Aciaki: z I-szej A (A First Grade Pupils)
- 1933: Mateusz Bigda
- ? : W cieniu zapomnianej olszyny (In the Shadow of a Forgotten Alden Forest)

== See also ==
- List of Poles
