= Baczynski =

Baczynski or Baczyński is a Polish surname. People with the surname include:

- Krzysztof Kamil Baczyński (1921–1944), Polish poet killed during the Warsaw Uprising
- Seth Baczynski (born 1981), American mixed martial artist
- Stanisław Baczyński (1890–1939), Polish writer and literary critic

== See also ==
- Bachinsky, Ukrainian/Russian version
