= In Purest Sorrow =

1942 poetry volume by Krzysztof Kamil Baczyński

- National Library of Poland
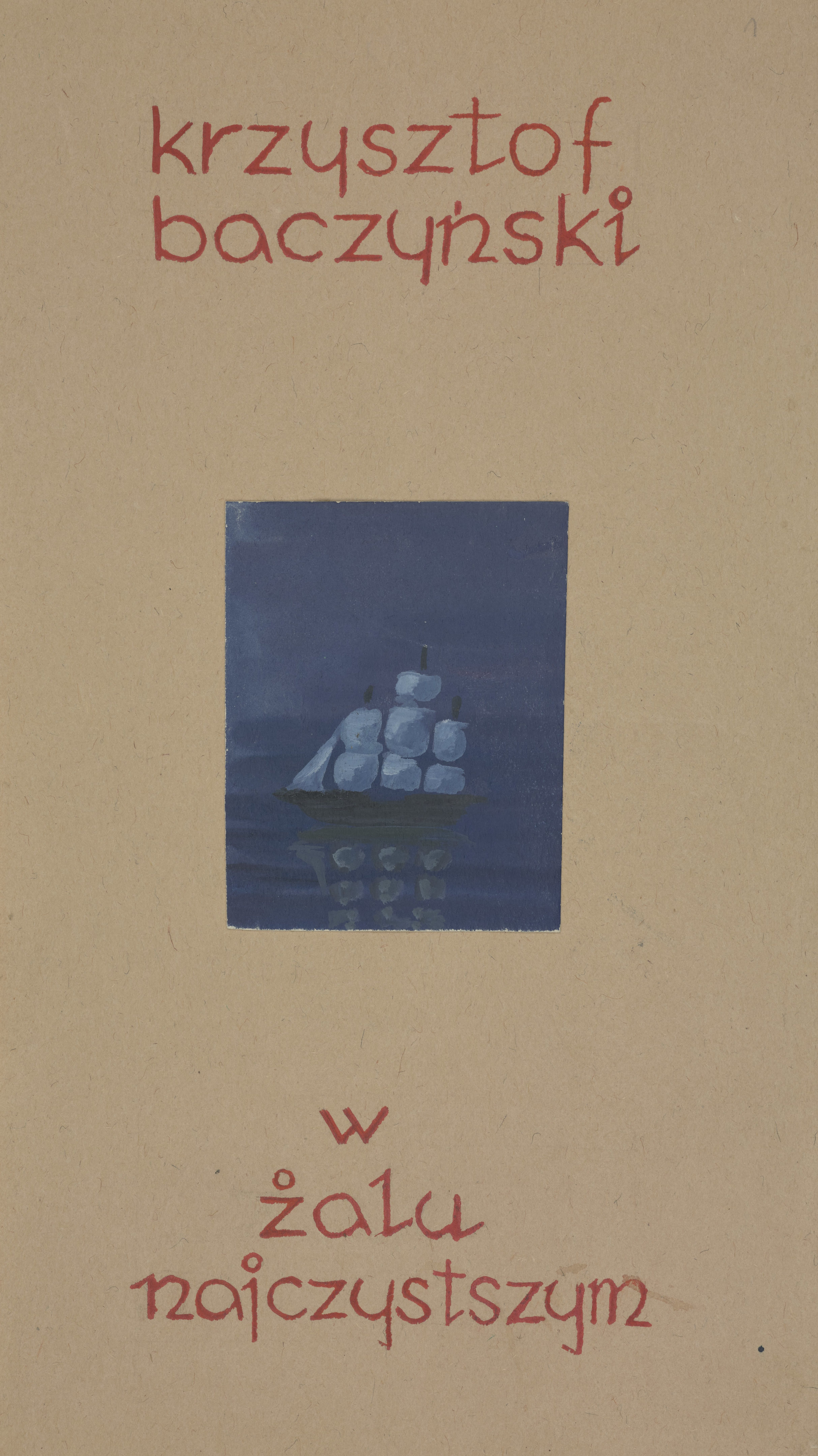
- Also known as: W żalu najczystszym
- Date: 1942
- Language: Polish
- Size: 23×14 cm, 20 leaves
- Accession: Rps 7978 I

In Purest Sorrow (Polish: W żalu najczystszym) is a hand-made volume of poetry by Krzysztof Kamil Baczyński from 1942.

Krzysztof Kamil Baczyński was the greatest Polish poet of the Generation of Columbuses. He died in 1944 in the Warsaw Uprising. The volume was the poet's wedding gift to his wife, Barbara Baczyńska (née Drapczyńska). It was hand-written and ornamented by the poet himself. The manuscript consists of 20 thick, light brown leaves sewn together with cotton filament. Each of the 18 poems in the volume, written in Baczyński's own hand, opens with a large colourful initial. Beneath the autographs of 13 poems are small watercolours painted by the poet.

The manuscript was purchased by the National Library of Poland in 1963 from Baczyński's mother-in-law, Feliksa Drapczyńska. In 2021, the volume was inscribed on UNESCO’S Memory of the World Register. From May 2024, the manuscript is presented at the permanent exhibition in the Palace of the Commonwealth.

== Bibliography ==
- Makowski, Tomasz; Sapała, Patryk, eds. (2024). The Palace of the Commonwealth. Three times opened. Treasures from the National Library of Poland at the Palace of the Commonwealth. Warsaw: National Library of Poland.
- Tchórzewska-Kabata, Halina; Dąbrowski, Maciej, eds. (2003). More precious than gold. Treasures of the Polish National Library (electronic version) (PDF). Translated by Dorosz, Janina. Warsaw: National Library of Poland. ISBN 83-7009-402-3.
