= Polish Sign Language =

Deaf sign language of Poland

- Polski Język Migowy
- Native to: Poland
- Native speakers: 40,000 to 50,000 (2014)
- Language family: unclassified, possibly an isolate: Polish Sign Language

Language codes
- ISO 639-3: pso
- Glottolog: poli1259

Polish Sign Language (Polish: Polski język migowy, PJM) is the language of the deaf community in Poland. Polish Sign Language uses a distinctive one-handed manual alphabet based on the alphabet used in Old French Sign Language and therefore appears to be related to French Sign Language. It may also have common features with Russian Sign Language and German Sign Language, which is related to the history of Poland during the Partitions, when Russification and Germanization influenced the Polish language, and may also have borrowings from the sign language used in the Austrian partition. Its lexicon and grammar are distinct from the Polish language, although there is a manually coded version of Polish known as System Językowo-Migowy (SJM, or Signed Polish), which is often used by interpreters on television and by teachers in schools.

Polish Sign Language was first formed/became prevalent around 1817. Around that time, the Instytut Głuchoniemych (Institute for the Deaf-Mute) was founded by Jakub Falkowski, who began teaching deaf children after meeting a deaf boy by the name of Piotr Gąsowski. In 1879, its first dictionary was published by Józef Hollak and Teofil Jagodziński, titled "Słownik mimiczny dla głuchoniemych i osób z nimi styczność mających" ("The Mimic Dictionary for the Deaf-Mute and Persons Having Contact with Them").

In 2012, under the "Sign Language Act", the language received official status in Poland and can be chosen as the language of instruction by those who require it.

== History ==
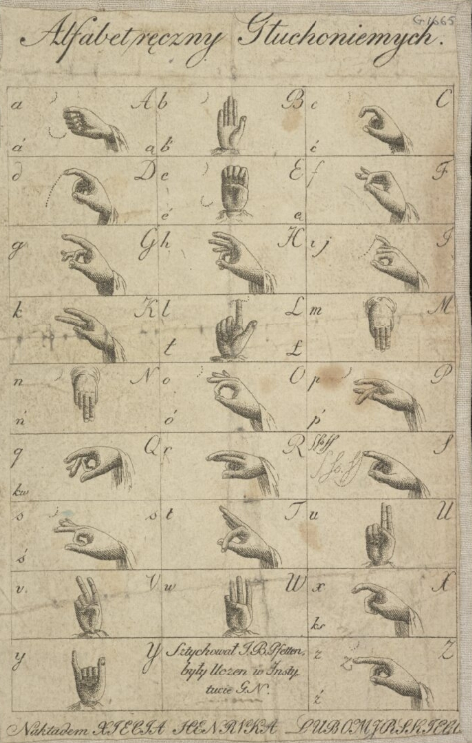
An alphabet of sign language sketched by a student of the Institute for the Deaf (IGN) and published by Prince Henryk Lubomirski (19th century)

The first mentions of Polish Sign Language appeared in the second decade of the 19th century. In 1817, Father Jakub Falkowski founded the Institute for the Deaf and Blind (Instytut Głuchoniemych i Ociemniałych) in the Casimir Palace in Warsaw. This created the possibility of educating deaf people in their natural language. The Institute for the Deaf was later moved to Three Crosses Square (Plac Trzech Krzyży), where it still operates today.

Early observations and analyses of the language of the deaf in Poland—at that time not yet called Polish Sign Language—were included in the first sign language dictionary, published in 1879 (J. Hollak, T. Jagodziński, "Mimic Dictionary for the Deaf and Those in Contact with Them", Warsaw, 1879).

Polish Sign Language uses a one-handed manual alphabet derived from Old French Sign Language, which makes it appear related to French Sign Language. It may also share features with Russian and German Sign Language, linked to Poland’s history during the partitions, when russification and germanisation strongly influenced the Polish language. It may also contain borrowings from the sign language used in the Austrian partition.

For over 100 years—from the mid-19th century to the mid-1980s—the oralist doctrine dominated deaf education. According to this approach, deaf people were expected to learn lip reading. Signing was forbidden, and in schools there were cases of tying students’ hands to prevent them from signing. (Note: "In 1957, Kazimierz Kirejczyk, who was involved in creating special education in Poland, wrote: 'Let us remember: it is forbidden to use signs! It is absolutely necessary to isolate them from the lives of deaf children. It is best if they do not know signs at all'.") As a result, many deaf people believe that sign language was marginalized by hearing people trying to impose their own views on deaf communication.

In 1984, Wacław Kur, an official working on deaf education at the Ministry of Education, visited Stockholm, where he observed teaching conducted in sign language and its clearly better results compared to lip reading. After returning, he permitted the auxiliary use of the Signed Language System (system językowo-migowy) for teaching speech to deaf students. Teachers also began to be trained in this system. However, Polish Sign Language (PJM) itself was not introduced into schools. Consequently, a hybrid artificial communication system combining sign elements with manually coded Polish was introduced into the deaf community.

There are still no official curricula for teaching Polish Sign Language, nor are there standards for PJM teachers, meaning that deaf students cannot learn or develop skills in their own natural language at school. The beginnings of professional sign language interpreting education only appeared in 2008 at the University of Warsaw.

The term “Polish Sign Language” (polski język migowy, PJM) was introduced by Michael Farris, a linguist at the Institute of Linguistics of Adam Mickiewicz University in Poznań, who used it in his 1994 paper Sign Language Research and Polish Sign Language (Lingua Posnaniensis, 1994, No. 36). Until the 1990s, no scientific research had been conducted on Polish Sign Language.[7]

The Sign Language Linguistics Laboratory (PLM) at the Faculty of Polish Studies, University of Warsaw, is one of the four largest sign language research databases in the world—alongside those for Australian, German, and British Sign Languages.

By March 2014, PLM had identified 6,610 lexemes in PJM, appearing in a corpus of more than 200,000 uses. Based on this material, the Corpus Dictionary of Polish Sign Language was created, presenting the polysemy (multiple meanings) of signs and their usage in specific contexts. The laboratory, in cooperation with the Ministry of National Education, is also preparing textbooks for learning sign language.

For deaf Poles who use Polish Sign Language as their native language, spoken Polish is a foreign language that they learn only to a limited extent. Although they can write in Polish, they often make grammar mistakes typical of foreigners.

Some deaf individuals are unable to learn spoken Polish at all. Today, some people consider requiring the deaf to use the oral method (speaking and lip reading) a form of violence, aimed at destroying their culture, comparable to the assimilation of Indigenous minorities in Canada.

== Grammatical structure ==
For a long time in Poland, sign languages were considered primitive and thought to lack grammar. In reality, PJM, like other sign languages, forms a system with its own grammatical structure, distinct from Polish. Contrary to popular belief, it is possible to express complex concepts on any topic familiar to hearing people using sign language.

=== Phonology ===
In PJM, there are no sound-based equivalents of phonemes; instead, there are visual realizations of these elements. Thus, one can speak of PJM phonemes as abstract representations of bundles of distinctive features.

However, some scholars argue that it is not accurate to speak of phonemes in PJM, but rather of isolated distinctive features (diacritics) that directly participate in the formation of morphemes. Therefore, it would be a kind of diacritic phonology, not a phoneme-based phonology.

=== Morphology ===
PJM has a rich morphology, encompassing both inflection and derivation. It features analytical as well as synthetic inflectional mechanisms.

Its inflectional categories are very different from those in Polish:

- there is no grammatical case,
- the agent person category is weakly developed.

Unique inflectional categories in PJM include:

- the object person category,
- the inclusivity–exclusivity category,
- the class category.

Some linguists argue that the "class" should not be treated as a separate inflectional category, but rather as a specialized part of speech — a classifier (understood differently, however, than classifiers in spoken languages).

=== Syntax ===
In longer sentences, PJM typically follows the SVO (Subject–Verb–Object) word order, with modifiers added at the end. In shorter sentences, the SOV (Subject–Object–Verb) order also appears.

Relationships between clauses in complex sentences are expressed through special mimetic morphemes (facial or body expressions with grammatical meaning).

=== Non-manual features ===
Non-manual elements play an essential role in PJM communication—particularly the position and movement of the torso and head (tilts, turns) and facial expressions.

The use of these elements is grammaticalized—that is, it belongs to the language system itself, not just to personal expression.

=== Simultaneity / Synchronicity ===
The difficulty in distinguishing phonology, morphology, and syntax in PJM arises partly from its different communicative structure compared to spoken languages.

Because of the functional independence of articulators—such as the left hand, right hand, and face—it is possible to produce several signs simultaneously. In many cases, the way these signs are combined is strictly determined by grammatical rules.

== Scientific research on Polish Sign Language ==
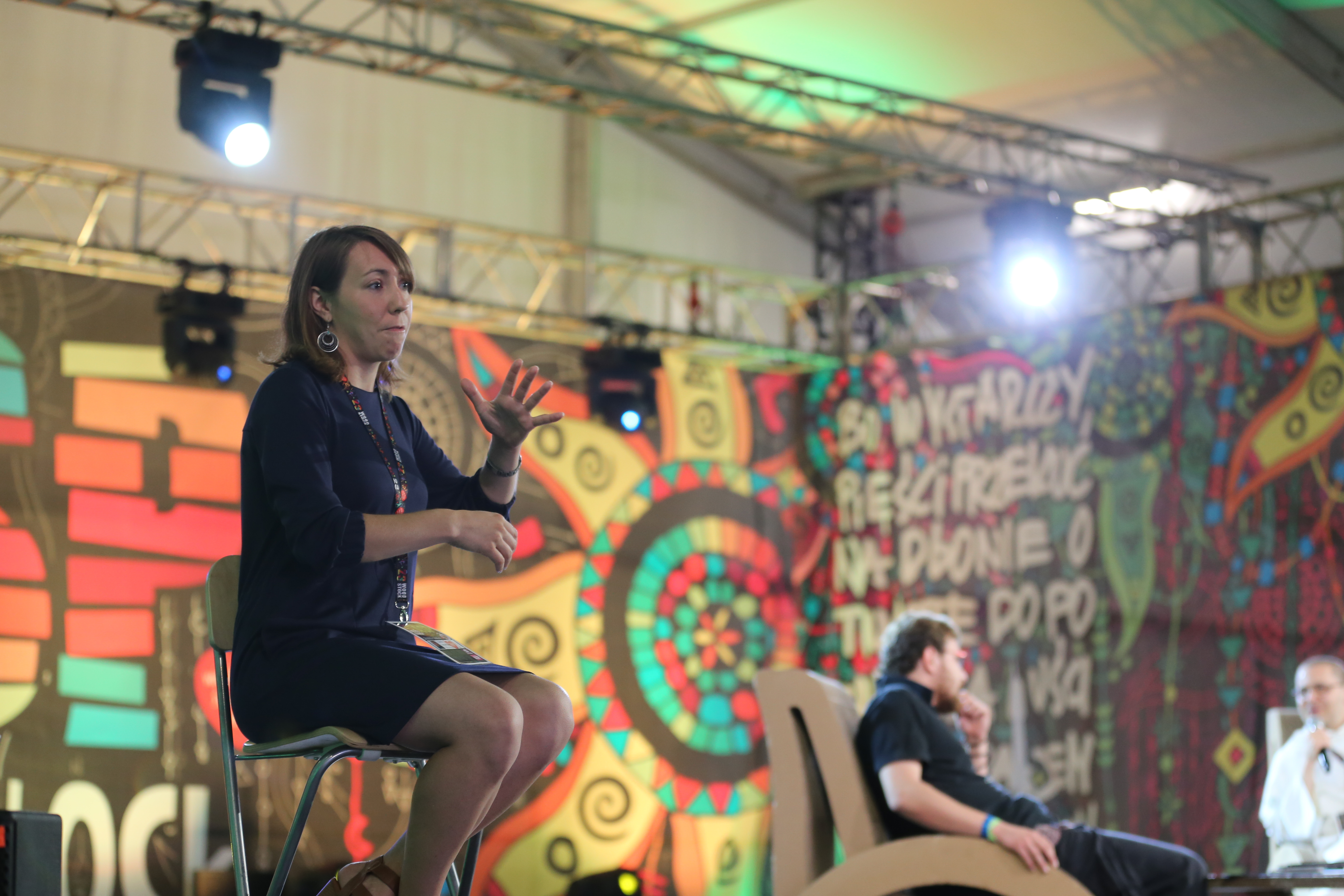
A Polish Sign Language interpreter at ASP tent (Academy of Finest Arts) at Przystanek Woodstock in 2017

Scientific research on Polish Sign Language (PJM) began relatively recently, with a significant delay compared to studies of sign languages in Western countries. The term “Polish Sign Language” (Polski Język Migowy) and its abbreviation PJM were introduced into linguistic research in 1994 by Michael A. Farris (Adam Mickiewicz University in Poznań) in the first linguistic paper devoted to this language. Since then, additional articles have been published by Farris and by members of a research group formed in the second half of the 1990s, led by Marek Świdziński at the University of Warsaw. All works published so far provide only partial descriptions of the grammatical structure of PJM.

A few texts published before 1994, which claimed to be scientific and included “Polish Sign Language” in their titles, in fact dealt with the Signed Language System (system językowo-migowy) — mainly the works of Bogdan Szczepankowski and Jacek Perlin. PJM as a research topic was only recognized in the mid-1990s.

At the University of Warsaw, the Faculty of Polish Studies offers a master’s degree program in Polish Sign Language Philology (Filologia Polskiego Języka Migowego). It is the only academic program in Poland providing education in this field and enabling students to achieve C1-level language proficiency according to the Common European Framework of Reference for Languages (CEFR).

== Scholarly literature ==
- Piotr Fabian and Jarosław Francik. "Synthesis and presentation of the Polish sign language gestures." 1st International Conf. on Applied Mathematics and Informatics at Universities. 2001.
- Farris, M. A. Sign language research and Polish sign language. Lingua Posnaniensis 36 (1994): 13–36.
- Mariusz Oszust and Marian Wysocki. Polish sign language words recognition with Kinect. Human System Interaction (HSI), 2013 The 6th International Conference on. IEEE, 2013.
- Włodarczak, Aleksandra, Agnieszka Kossowska, and Małgorzata Haładewiczygrzelak. "Understanding Loans from Standard Polish into the Polish Sign Language." Communication as a Life Process, Volume Two: The Holistic Paradigm in Language Sciences (2019): 73ff. Cambridge Scholars Publishing.
