= Languages of Poland =

Languages spoken in Poland

- Official: Polish
- Regional: Silesian (467,145), German (216,342), Kashubian (89,198), Belarusian (17,325), Rusyn (8,444), Romani (7,284), Lithuanian (5,422), Czech (5,328)
- Immigrant: English (737,276), Russian (63,271), Ukrainian (55,104), French (41,895), Italian (38,388), Spanish (29,480), Dutch (17,633), Norwegian (14,157), Swedish (10,318), Greek (5,339), and others
- Foreign: English, German, Russian, Spanish
- Signed: Polish Sign Language, Signed Polish

Polish is the only official language recognized by Poland's constitution, and the majority of the country's population speak it as a native language or use it for home communication. However, there are various regional languages and languages brought by immigrants. Deaf communities in Poland use Polish Sign Language, which belongs to the German family of Sign Languages.

Languages other than Polish that have existed in the region for at least 100 years can gain recognition as a regional or minority language, which have appropriate rules of use. In areas where the speakers of these languages make up more than 20% of the population, the language can receive the status of auxiliary language, while Polish remains the official language.

According to the Act of 6 January 2005 on national and ethnic minorities and on the regional languages, 16 languages have been recognized as minority languages; 1 regional language, 10 languages belonging to 9 national minorities (minorities from another sovereign state) and 5 languages belonging to 4 ethnic minorities (minorities that do not belong to another sovereign state). Jewish and Romani minorities each have 2 recognized minority languages.

== Household languages ==
Language used in households by population as reported in the 2021 national census:

1. Polish (37,868,618)
2. English (737,276)
3. Silesian (467,145)
4. German (216,342)
5. Kashubian (89,198)
6. Russian (63,271)
7. Ukrainian (55,104)
8. French (41,895)
9. Italian (38,388)
10. Spanish (29,480)
11. Dutch (17,633)
12. Belarusian (17,325)
13. Norwegian (14,157)
14. Swedish (10,318)
15. Polish Sign Language (9,267)
16. Rusyn (8,444)
17. Romani (7,284)
18. Lithuanian (5,422)
19. Greek (5,339)
20. Czech (5,328)
21. Danish (4,787)
22. Vietnamese (4,735)
23. Arabic (3,848)
24. Podlachian (3,761)
25. Portuguese (3,686)
26. Turkish (2,883)
27. Japanese (2,455)
28. Chinese (2,435)
29. Slovak (2,382)
30. Armenian (2,220)
31. Others (30,520)
32. Unreported (32,381)

== National minority languages ==
- Armenian
- Belarusian
- Czech
- German
- Yiddish
- Hebrew
- Lithuanian
- Russian
- Slovak
- Ukrainian

== Ethnic minority languages ==
- Karaim
- Rusyn, called Lemko in Poland (Polish: "Łemkowski", see Lemko)
- Two Romani languages are officially recognised: Polska Roma and Bergitka Roma.
- Tatar, called Tartar in the English translation of the act.

Official recognition gives the representatives of the minority under certain conditions the right to education in their language, having their language established as a secondary administrative language or help language in their municipality, financial support in the promotion of their language and culture, etc.

== Regional languages ==
Official recognition as a regional language:

- Kashubian

== Unrecognised regional languages ==
Article 19 of the Act defines a regional language as being "different from the official language of that State; it shall not include either dialects of the official language of the State or the languages of migrants", meaning that a select few of minority languages, which are sometimes considered dialects or varieties of an existing language (such as Polish or German), were either deliberately or unintentionally omitted, as listed below:

- Silesian, a regional language closely related to Polish. Its status is still hotly debated to be either a dialect of Polish or a language in its own right by linguists.
- Podlachian is an East Slavic language variety spoken by Podlashuks near the southern area of the Podlachian Voivodeship, variously described as a dialect of Belarusian or Ukrainian.
- Wymysorys is a West Germanic endangered language with very few speakers. It is native to Wilamowice, Silesian Voivodeship, but, unlike the similarly endangered Karaim language, it was practically unknown during the preparation of the aforementioned Act.
- Alzenau, is an East Central German dialect spoken in the former village of Hałcnów, which is now a district of Bielsko-Biała, Silesian Voivodeship.

== Auxiliary languages ==
The bilingual status of gminas (municipalities) in Poland is regulated by the Act of 6 January 2005 on National and Ethnic Minorities and on the Regional Languages, which permits certain gminas with significant linguistic minorities to introduce a second, auxiliary language to be used in official contexts alongside Polish. The following is a list of languages by the number of gminas that have them as auxiliary languages.

- Kashubian (5)
- Lithuanian (1)
- German (22)
- Belarusian (5)

== Languages of bilingual settlements ==
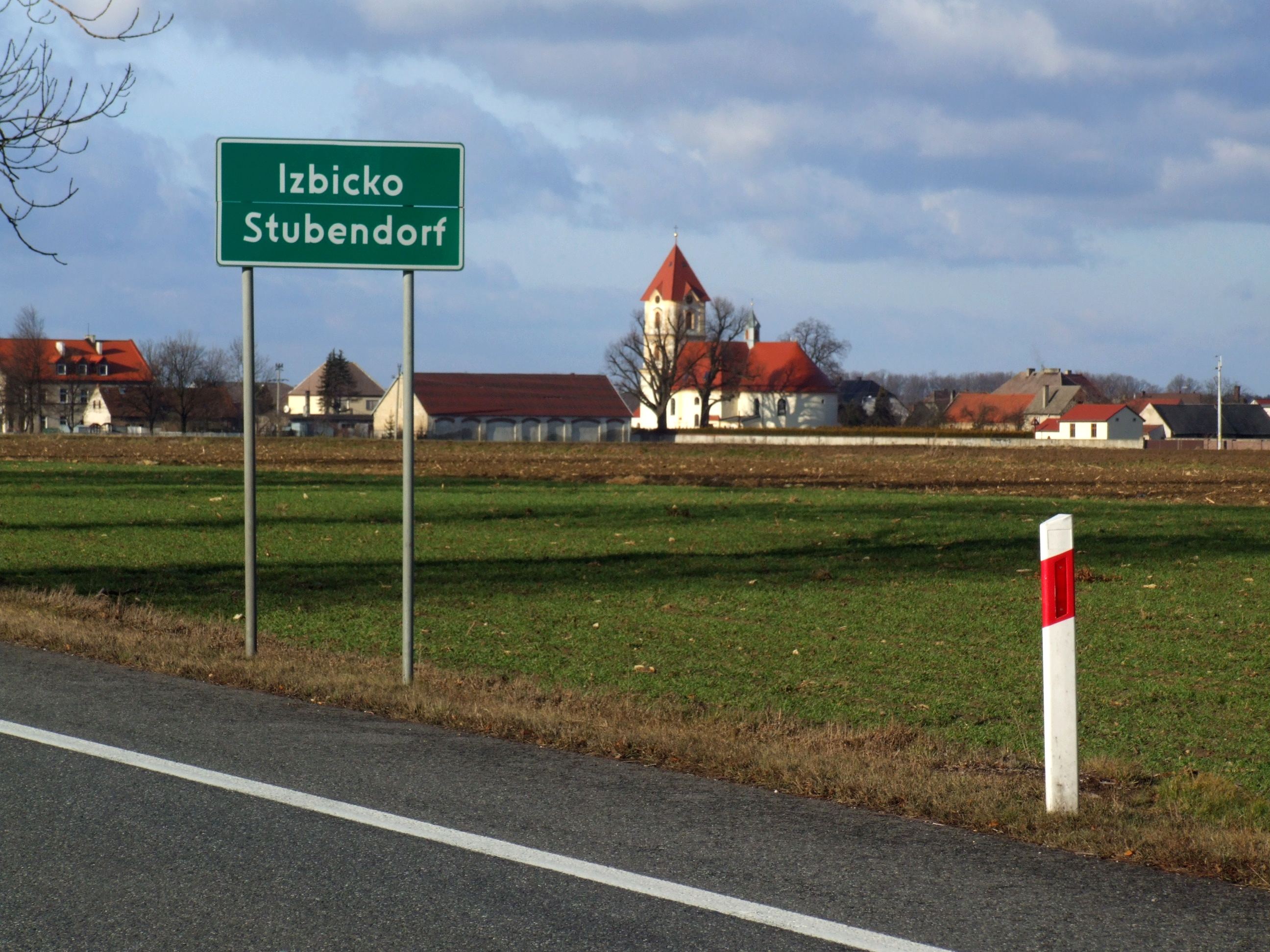
Polish and German bilingual road sign in village Izbicko, Opole Voivodeship

A settlement can use any officially recognised, regional, or minority languages in their name. Currently only 5 settlements have exercised this power. The following is a list of languages by their use in settlements dual language names.

- Belarusian (27)
- German (359)
- Kashubian (827)
- Lithuanian (30)
- Rusyn (9)

== Languages of diasporas and immigrants ==
These languages are not recognised as minority languages, as the Act of 2005 defines minority as "a group of Polish citizens (...) striving to preserve its language, culture or tradition, (...) whose ancestors have been living on the present territory of the Republic of Poland for at least 100 years":

- Greek: the language of the Greek diaspora in Poland of 1950s.
- Vietnamese: the language of the biggest immigrant community in Poland since the 1960s, having their own newspapers, schools, churches etc.

== Sign languages ==
The Polish Sign Language is the language of the deaf community in Poland. It descends from German Sign Language. Its lexicon and grammar are distinct from the Polish language, although there is a manually coded version of Polish known as System Językowo-Migowy (SJM, or Signed Polish), which is often used by interpreters on television and by teachers in schools. In 2012, under the "Sign Language Act", the language received official status and can be chosen as the language of instruction by those who require it.

== Dead and artificial languages ==
Among languages used in Poland, Ethnologue mentions one constructed language – the International Auxiliary Language Esperanto (created in Poland), and one dead language – Prussian, but does not mention two other known defunct languages: Slovincian, which consists of dialects of Pomeranian, died out in the beginning of the 20th century, and is closely related to Kashubian, and Yatvingian, which died around the mid-16th (or possibly end of 19th) century. As the result of post-WW2 border shift at Germany's expense and ethnic cleansing, various dialects of German historically prevalent in Poland's western and northwestern regions have become endangered, such as Lower Silesian and Low German.

== Foreign languages ==
Eurobarometer studies in 2012 showed that 33%, 19%, and 18% of Poles declared themselves able to have a conversation in English, German, and Russian, respectively. As of 2015, around 32% of Polish citizens declared knowledge of the English language according to the Centre for Public Opinion Research. However, other surveys show that over 50% of Poles can speak English. Another study shows that 89% of Polish students are learning and/or can speak English.

== See also ==
- Dialects of Polish
