= Polish manual alphabet =

Alphabet used in Polish Sign Language

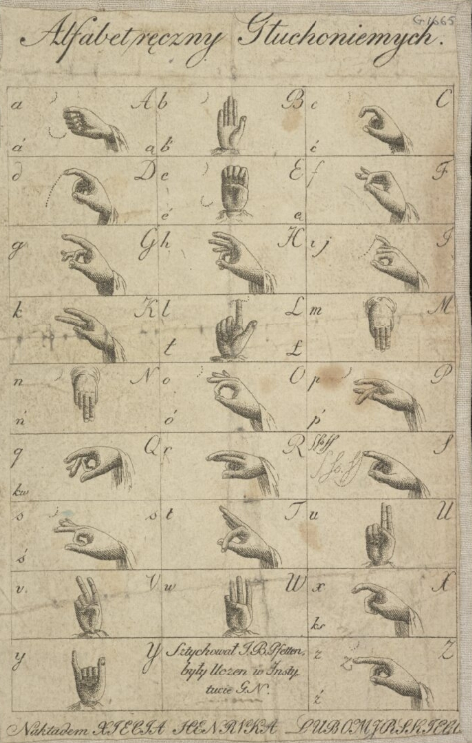
First published version of the Polish manual alphabet

The Polish manual alphabet is a single-handed manual alphabet used in Polish Sign Language (Polski język migowy; PJM).

PJM users fingerspell via this alphabet, to express words that are not otherwise available within PJM. Such use cases include names, technical jargon, and abbreviations/acronyms.
