= Bachinsky =

Bachinsky (Russian: Бачи́нский), female form Bachinskaya (Russian: Бачи́нская), also transliterated as Bachynsky and Bachinskiy is a Slavic surname, prevalent in Ukraine, Russia, Canada and the United States.

Notable people with this surname include:

== Bachinsky ==
- Elizabeth Bachinsky (born 1976), Canadian poet
- Gennady Bachinsky (1971–2008), Russian radio host

== Bachynsky ==
- Nicholas Bachynsky (1887–1969), Canadian politician
- Yulian Bachynsky (1870–1940), Ukrainian diplomat

== See also ==
- Baczynski, Polish version
