= Barbara Drapczyńska =

Barbara Stanisława Drapczyńska (November 1922 in a village of Wiecznia Kościelna near Ciechanów – 1 September 1944 in Warsaw) was the wife of Krzysztof Kamil Baczyński, and a student of Polish Philology at the secret Warsaw University, during the German occupation of Warsaw.

Drapczyńska's father ran a printing shop at Piękna Street in Warsaw. She met her future husband on 1 December 1941. 6 months later, they were engaged. The wedding took place on 3 June 1942 at 10am in the church of the Holy Trinity in the district of Solec. After the ceremony they lived together. Drapczyńska was Baczyński's muse; he wrote several erotic poems dedicated to her.

She died pregnant on 1 September 1944, during the Warsaw Uprising, struck in the head by fragmenting glass shards that penetrated her skull, damaging her brain. At the moment of death, she had in her hands the Kennkarte of her husband as well as his book. Baczyński had foreseen this in a poem written a few weeks earlier, on 13 July 1944. According to witnesses, Drapczyńska was mortally wounded on 26 August and suffered terribly for five days before her death. She died not knowing that her husband had been killed by a sniper in the early days of the Uprising.

== Sources ==
- Tygodnik Ciechanowski online - śladami Barbary Drapczyńskiej z Wieczfni Kościelnej: żona Krzysztofa Kamila at www.tc.ciechanow.pl
- Krzysztof Kamil Baczyński at www.powstanie-warszawskie-1944.ac.pl
