= Sign Language System =

Manually coded form of Polish

Sign Language System, (Note: Polish: System Językowo-Migowy, abbreviation: SJM) also known as Signed Language (Note: Polish: język migany) or Signed Polish, is a manually coded form of Polish that uses the signs of Polish Sign Language. It is commonly used for simultaneous "translation" of Polish into sign.

In 2011, Polish Sign Language System was legally recognized.
