= Stanisław Baczyński =

Polish writer (1890–1939)

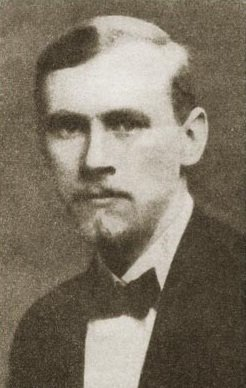
- Born: 5 May 1890; Lemberg, Kingdom of Galicia and Lodomeria, Cisleithania, Austria-Hungary
- Died: 27 July 1939 (aged 49); Warsaw, Poland
- Other names: Adam Kersten, Bittner, Akst
- Occupations: Literary critic, writer
- Political party: Polish Socialist Party
- Children: Krzysztof Kamil Baczyński

Signature
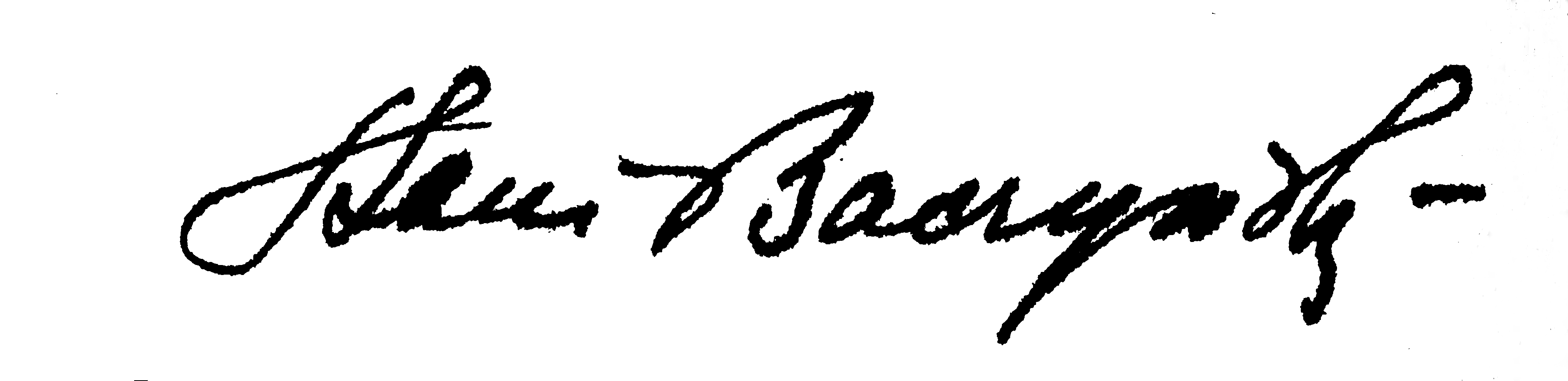

Stanisław Baczyński aka "Adam Kersten", "Bittner", "Akst" (27 July 1890 in Lwów – 27 July 1939 in Warsaw, Poland) was a Polish writer, literary critic, socialist, journalist, soldier of the Polish Legions and captain of the Polish Army. He was the father of Krzysztof Kamil Baczyński.

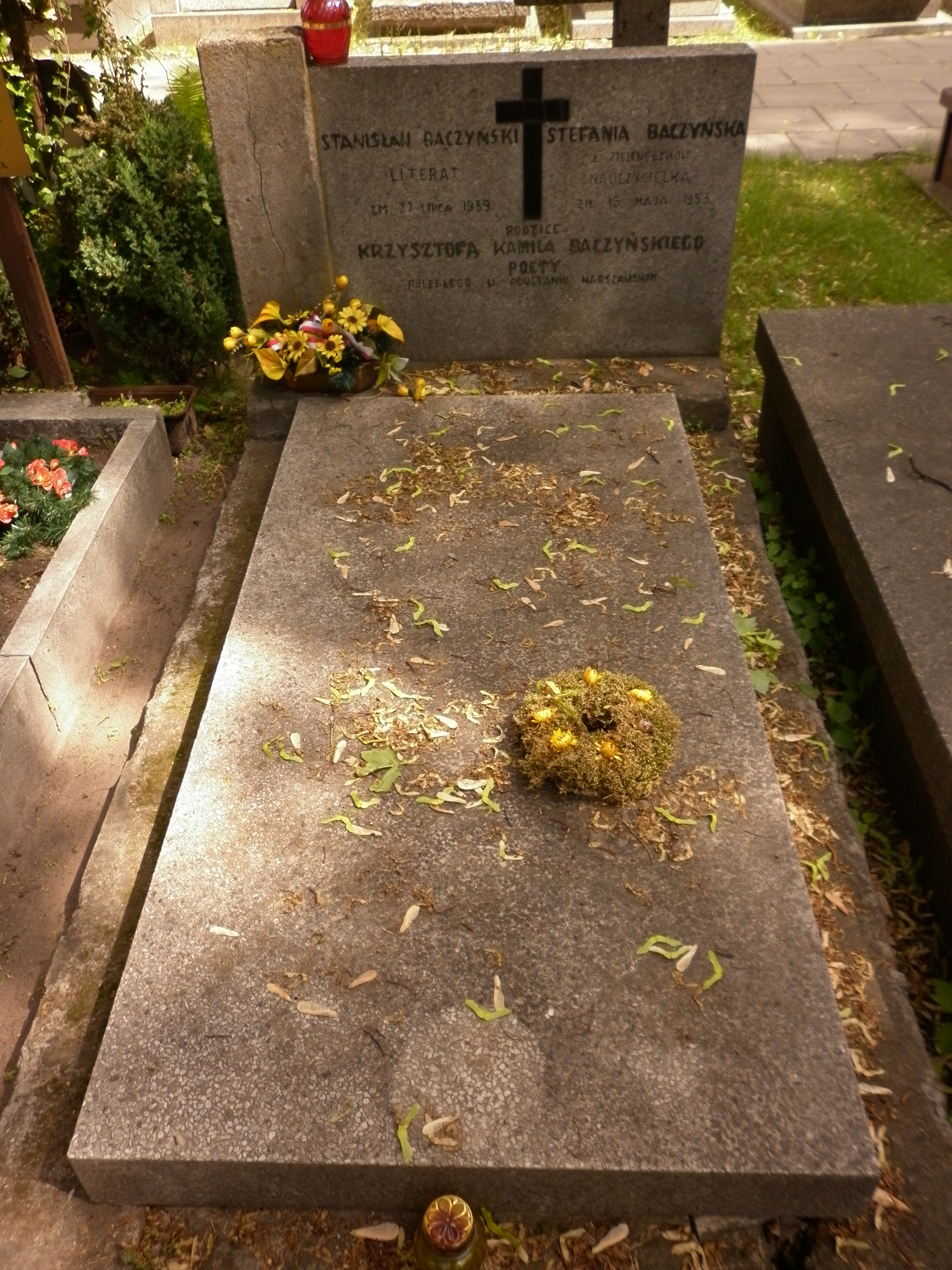
Tombstone of Stanisław Baczyński and Stefania Baczyńska (Warsaw, Powązki Cemetery)

== Works ==
- Losy romansu,
- Prawo sądu,
- Syty Praklet i głodny Prometeusz,
- Literatura w ZSRR,
- Wiszary

== Awards ==
- Cross of Independence
- Cross of Valor - three times
- Cross of Merit
- Silesian Ribbon of Valour and Merit
