= Krzysztof Kamil Baczyński =

Polish poet and Home Army soldier

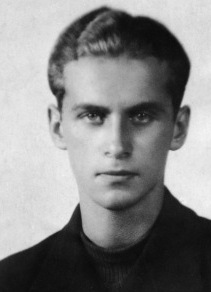
- Baczyński during the Second World War
- Born: 22 January 1921; Warsaw, Second Polish Republic
- Died: 4 August 1944 (aged 23); Warsaw, General Government
- Burial place: Powązki Military Cemetery
- Military career
- Allegiance: Home Army
- Branch: Grey Ranks
- Rank: Starszy szeregowy (Private first class)
- Nickname: Krzyś
- Unit: Parasol Battalion
- Conflicts: Warsaw Uprising
- Awards: Commander's Cross of Polonia Restituta; Cross of the Home Army; Medal for Warsaw 1939–1945
- Other work: poet

Krzysztof Kamil Baczyński, (Polish pronunciation: [ˈkʂɨʂtɔf ˈkamil baˈt͡ʂɨɲskʲi]; nom de guerre: Jan Bugaj; 22 January 1921 – 4 August 1944) was a Polish poet and Home Army soldier, one of the most well known of the Generation of Columbuses, the young generation of Polish poets, of whom several perished in the Warsaw Uprising and during the German occupation of Poland.

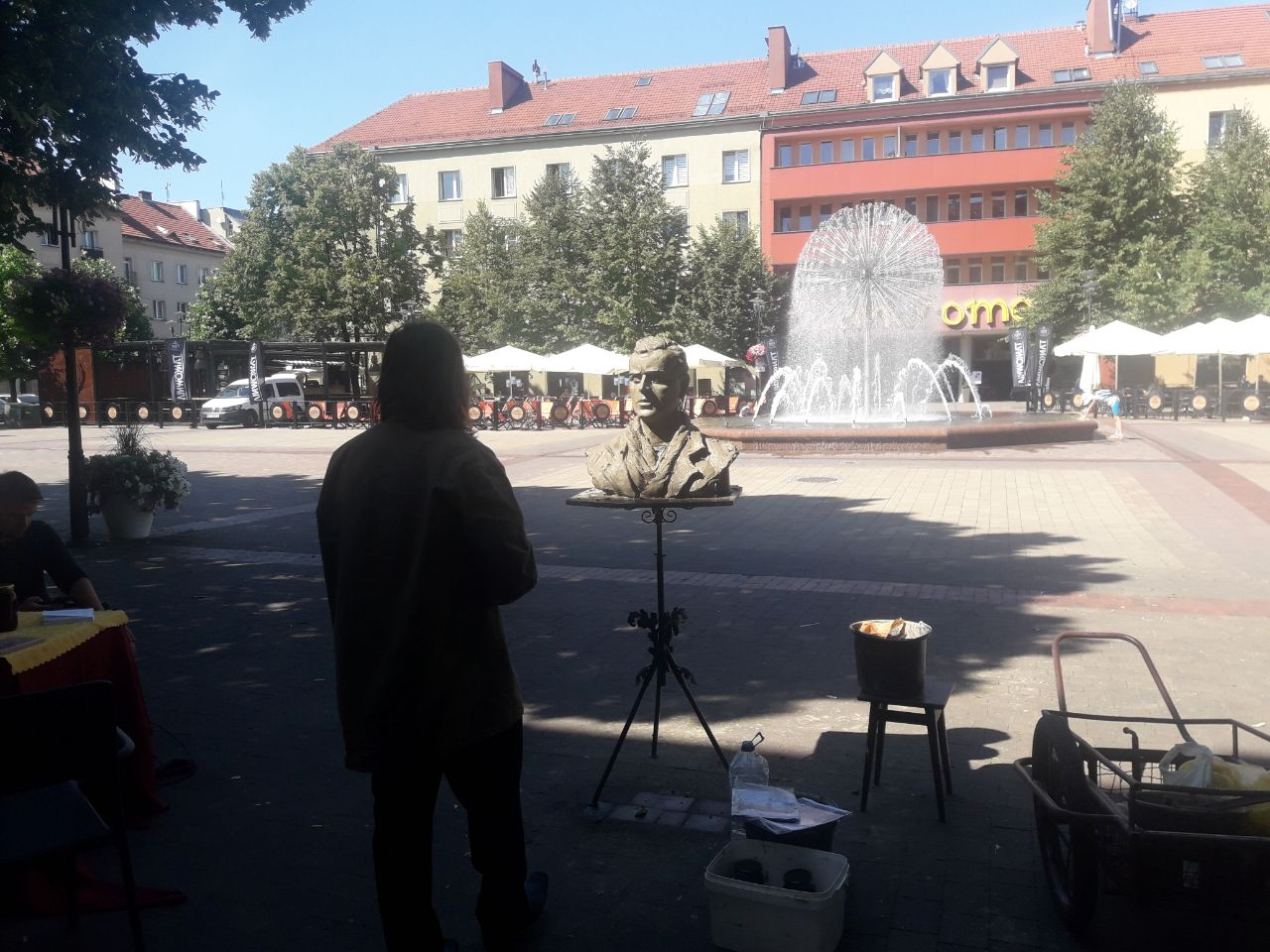

== Biography ==
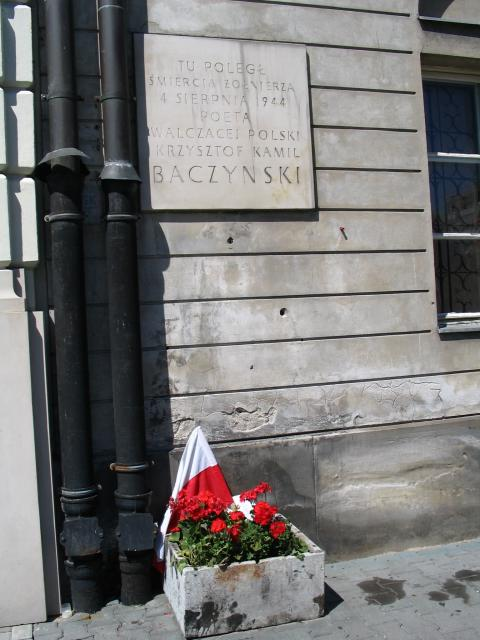
Stone tablet marking the place of death of Krzysztof Kamil Baczyński

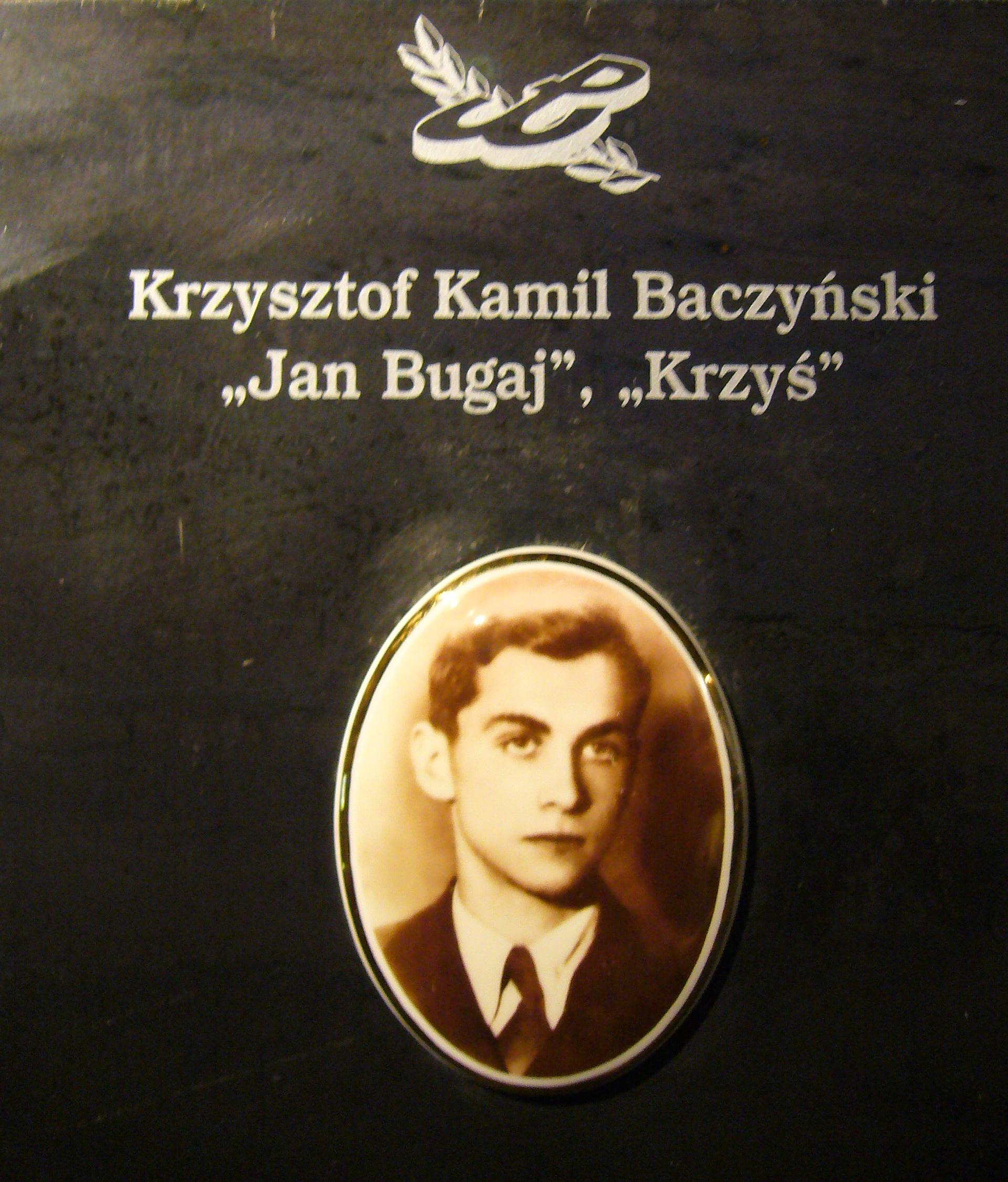
Stone tablet of Krzysztof Kamil Baczyński in the Warsaw Uprising Museum

Baczyński was born in Warsaw into the family of renowned literary critic and soldier of the Polish Legions in World War I, Stanisław Baczyński and school teacher Stefania Zieleńczyk. His mother was Catholic with Jewish roots and was therefore treated as Jewish by the Germans. His uncle, Dr. Adam Zieleńczyk, escaped from the Warsaw Ghetto and was killed by Germans in 1943.

Baczynski was baptized on 7 September 1922 in Warsaw. As a child, he suffered from asthma, his heart was very weak and he was in constant threat of tuberculosis. In 1933, he began education at Gimnazjum i Liceum im. Stefana Batorego, he graduated in May 1939. His graduating class cohort included future Szare Szeregi heroes Jan Bytnar (Rudy), Maciej Aleksy Dawidowski (Alek) and Tadeusz Zawadzki (Zośka).

Baczyński debuted as a poet some time in 1938 in Strzała - a magazine published by the Organization of Socialist Youth Spartakus, to which he belonged himself. After graduation, he wished to continue his education at Warsaw's Academy of Fine Arts, but the outbreak of World War II ended these plans.

During the German and Soviet (until 1941) occupation of Poland, he continued to work with the left-wing underground press, most notably with the "Płomienie" (Flames) and "Droga" (Way) magazines. At the same time he was a student of Polish language at the secret underground Warsaw University and the Armia Krajowa's "Agricola" NCOs School. He took up several jobs, and in 1943 joined Batalion Zośka, after which he gave up studies, committing himself to the Polish resistance activities. In his apartment, he hid several pieces of weaponry, including submachine guns and grenades.

On 3 June 1942, he married Barbara Drapczyńska, a university colleague. The marriage resulted in a set of erotica written by Baczyński, reputedly one of the most notable in the Polish language. In 1942, he gave his wife a hand-made volume of poetry In Purest Sorrow as a wedding gift. Shortly before the Warsaw Uprising Baczyński gave a copy of all his poems to one of his friends, to hide in Żoliborz. Because of that, they survived the war.

As a member of Scouting Assault Groups (Harcerskie Grupy Szturmowe), Baczyński took part in many sabotage actions throughout the occupation. One of them was derailment of a German military train in August 1944, which resulted in a 26-hour delay of traffic on the strategic connection Warsaw-Białystok.

After the Warsaw Uprising broke out, he joined the Parasol battalion. He was killed in action by a German sniper at approximately 4pm on 4 August 1944 in the Blank Palace in the Warsaw Old Town. He is buried in the Powązki Military Cemetery, together with his pregnant wife, who was killed on 1 September 1944. He was posthumously awarded the cross of the Home Army and in 1947 the Medal for Warsaw 1939–1945 (pl).

In his poems and short novels, Baczyński demonstrated both romantic traditions and catastrophism. His poems depict the brutality of war, and suggest that love is the only force that can effectively defend a human being against it. His talent was highly appreciated by his contemporaries, Stanisław Pigoń, upon hearing news of Baczyński joining the Szare Szeregi, said to Kazimierz Wyka: We belong to a nation, whose fate is to shoot at the enemy with diamonds.

== Baczyński in Polish culture ==
- The 1984 film The Fourth Day (Dzień czwarty) tells the story of the last four days of his life.
- In 1965, Polish singer Ewa Demarczyk sang Baczyński poems on the LP "Wiersze wojenne" (eng. "War Poems")
- 1990 Jacek Kaczmarski: Kosmopolak – "Barykada (Śmierć Baczyńskiego)"
- 1991 Grzegorz Turnau: "Naprawdę nie dzieje się nic"
- 2005 Lao Che: Powstanie Warszawskie – "Godzina W"
- 2007 Zbigniew Hołdys - "Pocałunek"
- 2012 Tadek (FIRMA) - "Elegia o chłopcu polskim"
- The 2013 film "Baczyński"
- 2020 "Astronomia Poety. Baczyński." − Album by Kwadrofonik and Mela Koteluk
- 2022 Sanah - Baczyński (pisz do mnie listy)

== Published works ==
- White Magic and Other Poems trans. by Bill Johnston (Los Angeles: Green Integer, 2005).
