= Polish language =

West Slavic language

Polish
- polski
- Pronunciation: [ˈpɔlskʲi]
- Native to: Poland, Lithuania, and bordering regions
- Ethnicity: Polish
- Speakers: L1: 40 million (2021); L2: 2.1 million (2021); Total: 43 million (2021)
- Language family: Indo-European: Balto-Slavic; Slavic; West Slavic; Lechitic; East Lechitic; Polish
- Early forms: Old Polish: Middle Polish
- Dialects: Greater Poland; Goral; Lesser Poland; Masovian; New mixed dialects; Northern Borderlands; Silesian (Note: Also considered a separate language, see Silesian language#Dialect vs. language); Southern Borderlands
- Writing system: Latin script (Polish alphabet)
- Signed forms: Sign Language System

Official status
- Official language in: Poland; European Union
- Recognised minority language in: Bosnia and Herzegovina; Brazil; Czech Republic; Hungary; Lithuania; Romania; Slovakia; Ukraine
- Regulated by: Polish Language Council (of the Polish Academy of Sciences)

Language codes
- ISO 639-1: pl
- ISO 639-2: pol
- ISO 639-3: pol
- Glottolog: poli1260
- Linguasphere: 53-AAA-cc 53-AAA-b..-d (varieties: 53-AAA-cca to 53-AAA-ccu)
- Majority of Polish speakers Polish used alongside other languages Significant minority of Polish speakers outside of Poland

Polish (endonym: język polski, [ˈjɛ̃zɘ̟k ˈpɔlskʲi], polszczyzna [pɔlˈʂt͡ʂɘ̟zna] or simply polski, [ˈpɔlskʲi]) is a West Slavic language of the Lechitic subgroup, within the Indo-European language family, and is written in the Latin script. It is primarily spoken in Poland and serves as the official language of the country, as well as the language of the Polish diaspora around the world. In 2024, there were over 39.7 million Polish native speakers. It ranks as the sixth-most-spoken among languages of the European Union. Polish is subdivided into regional dialects. It maintains strict T–V distinction, obligatory honorifics, and other formalities when addressing individuals.

The traditional 32-letter Polish alphabet has nine additions (ą, ć, ę, ł, ń, ó, ś, ź, ż) to the letters of the basic 26-letter Latin alphabet, while removing three (x, q, v). Those three letters are at times included in an extended 35-letter alphabet. The traditional set comprises 23 consonants and nine written vowels, including two nasal vowels (ę, ą) denoted by a reversed diacritic hook called an ogonek. Polish is a synthetic and fusional language which has seven grammatical cases. It has fixed penultimate stress and an abundance of palatal consonants. Contemporary Polish developed in the 1700s as the successor to the medieval Old Polish (10th–16th centuries) and Middle Polish (16th–18th centuries).

Among the major languages, it is most closely related to Slovak and Czech but differs in terms of pronunciation and general grammar. In addition, Polish was profoundly influenced by Latin and other Romance languages like Italian and French as well as Germanic languages (most notably German), which contributed a large number of loanwords and grammatical structures. Extensive usage of nonstandard dialects has also shaped the standard language; many colloquialisms and expressions were directly borrowed from German or Yiddish and subsequently adopted into the vernacular of Polish in everyday use.

Historically, Polish was a lingua franca, important both diplomatically and academically in Central and part of Eastern Europe. In addition to being the official language of Poland, Polish is also spoken as a second language in eastern Germany, northern Czech Republic and Slovakia, western parts of Belarus and Ukraine as well as in southeast Lithuania and Latvia. Because of the emigration from Poland during different time periods, most notably after World War II, millions of Polish speakers can also be found in countries such as Canada, Argentina, Brazil, Israel, Australia, the United Kingdom and the United States.

== History ==
Polish began to emerge as a distinct language around the 10th century, the process largely triggered by the establishment and development of the Polish state. At the time, it was a collection of dialect groups with some mutual features, but much regional variation was present. Mieszko I, ruler of the Polans tribe from the Greater Poland region, united a few culturally and linguistically related tribes from the basins of the Vistula and Oder before eventually accepting baptism in 966. With the arrival of Western Christianity, Poland also adopted the Latin alphabet, which made it possible to write down Polish, which until then had existed only as a spoken language. The closest relatives of Polish are the Elbe and Baltic Sea Lechitic dialects (Polabian and Pomeranian varieties). All of them, except Kashubian, are extinct. The precursor to modern Polish is the Old Polish language. Ultimately, Polish descends from the unattested Proto-Slavic language.

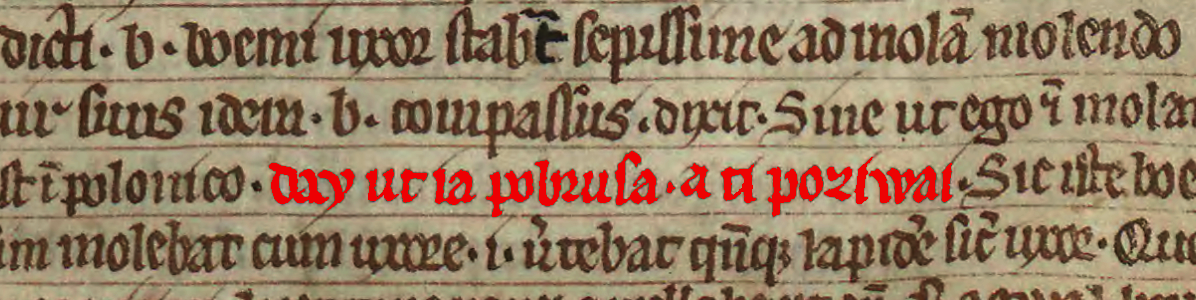
The Book of Henryków is the earliest document to include a sentence written entirely in what can be interpreted as Old Polish – Day, ut ia pobrusa, a ti poziwai, meaning "let me grind, and you have a rest" highlighted in red.

The Book of Henryków (Polish: Księga henrykowska, Latin: Liber fundationis claustri Sanctae Mariae Virginis in Heinrichau), contains the earliest known sentence written in the Polish language: Day, ut ia pobrusa, a ti poziwai (in modern orthography: Daj, uć ja pobrusza, a ti pocziwaj; the corresponding sentence in modern Polish: Daj, niech ja pomielę, a ty odpoczywaj or Pozwól, że ja będę mełł, a ty odpocznij; and in English: Come, let me grind, and you take a rest), written around 1280. The book is exhibited in the Archdiocesal Museum in Wrocław, in 2015 was added to UNESCO's "Memory of the World" list.

The medieval recorder of this phrase, the Cistercian monk Peter of the Henryków monastery, noted that "Hoc est in polonico" ("This is in Polish").

The earliest treatise on Polish orthography was written by Jakub Parkosz around 1470. The first printed book in Polish appeared in either 1508 or 1513, while the oldest Polish newspaper was established in 1661. Starting in the 1520s, large numbers of books in the Polish language were published, contributing to increased homogeneity of grammar and orthography. The writing system achieved its overall form in the 16th century, which is also regarded as the "Golden Age of Polish literature". The orthography was modified in the 19th century and in 1936.

Tomasz Kamusella notes that "Polish is the oldest, non-ecclesiastical, written Slavic language with a continuous tradition of literacy and official use, which has lasted unbroken from the 16th century to this day." Polish evolved into the main sociolect of the nobles in Poland–Lithuania in the 15th century. The history of Polish as a language of state governance begins in the 16th century in the Kingdom of Poland. Over the later centuries, Polish served as the official language in the Grand Duchy of Lithuania, Congress Poland, the Kingdom of Galicia and Lodomeria, and as the administrative language in the Russian Empire's Western Krai. The growth of the Polish–Lithuanian Commonwealth's influence gave Polish the status of lingua franca in Central and Eastern Europe.

The process of standardization began in the 14th century and solidified in the 16th century during the Middle Polish era. Standard Polish was based on various dialectal features, with the Greater Poland dialect group serving as the base. After World War II, Standard Polish became the most widely spoken variant of Polish across the country, and most dialects stopped being the form of Polish spoken in villages.

== Geographic distribution ==
Poland is one of the most linguistically homogeneous European countries; nearly 97% of Poland's citizens declare Polish as their first language. Elsewhere, Poles constitute large minorities in areas which were once administered or occupied by Poland, notably in neighboring Lithuania, Belarus, and Ukraine. Polish is the most widely used minority language in Lithuania's Vilnius County, by 26% of the population, according to the 2001 census results, as Vilnius was part of Poland from 1922 until 1939. Polish is found elsewhere in southeastern Lithuania. In Ukraine, it is most common in the western parts of Lviv and Volyn Oblasts, while in West Belarus it is used by the significant Polish minority, especially in the Brest and Grodno regions and in areas along the Lithuanian border. There are significant numbers of Polish speakers among Polish emigrants and their descendants in many other countries.

In the United States, Polish Americans number more than 11 million but most of them cannot speak Polish fluently. According to the 2000 United States census, 667,414 Americans of age five years and over reported Polish as the language spoken at home, which is about 1.4% of people who speak languages other than English, 0.25% of the US population, and 6% of the Polish-American population. The largest concentrations of Polish speakers reported in the census (over 50%) were found in three states: Illinois (185,749), New York (111,740), and New Jersey (74,663). Enough people in these areas speak Polish that PNC Financial Services (which has a large number of branches in all of these areas) offers services available in Polish at all of their cash machines in addition to English and Spanish.

According to the 2011 census there are now over 500,000 people in England and Wales who consider Polish to be their "main" language. In Canada, there is a significant Polish Canadian population: There are 242,885 speakers of Polish according to the 2006 census; in particular, there are concentrations of Polish speakers in Toronto (91,810 speakers) and Montreal.

The geographical distribution of the Polish language was greatly affected by the territorial changes of Poland immediately after World War II and Polish population transfers (1944–46). Poles settled in the "Recovered Territories" in the west and north, which had previously been mostly German-speaking. Some Poles remained in the previously Polish-ruled territories in the east that were annexed by the USSR, resulting in the present-day Polish-speaking communities in Lithuania, Belarus, and Ukraine, although many Poles were expelled from those areas to areas within Poland's new borders. To the east of Poland, the most significant Polish minority lives in a long strip along either side of the Lithuania-Belarus border. Meanwhile, the flight and expulsion of Germans (1944–50), as well as the expulsion of Ukrainians and Operation Vistula, the 1947 migration of Ukrainian minorities in the Recovered Territories in the west of the country, contributed to the country's linguistic homogeneity.

Geographic language distribution maps of Poland from pre-WWII to present

The "Recovered Territories" (in pink) were parts of Germany, including the Free City of Danzig (Gdańsk), that became part of Poland after World War II. The territory shown in grey was lost to the Soviet Union, which expelled many Poles from the area.

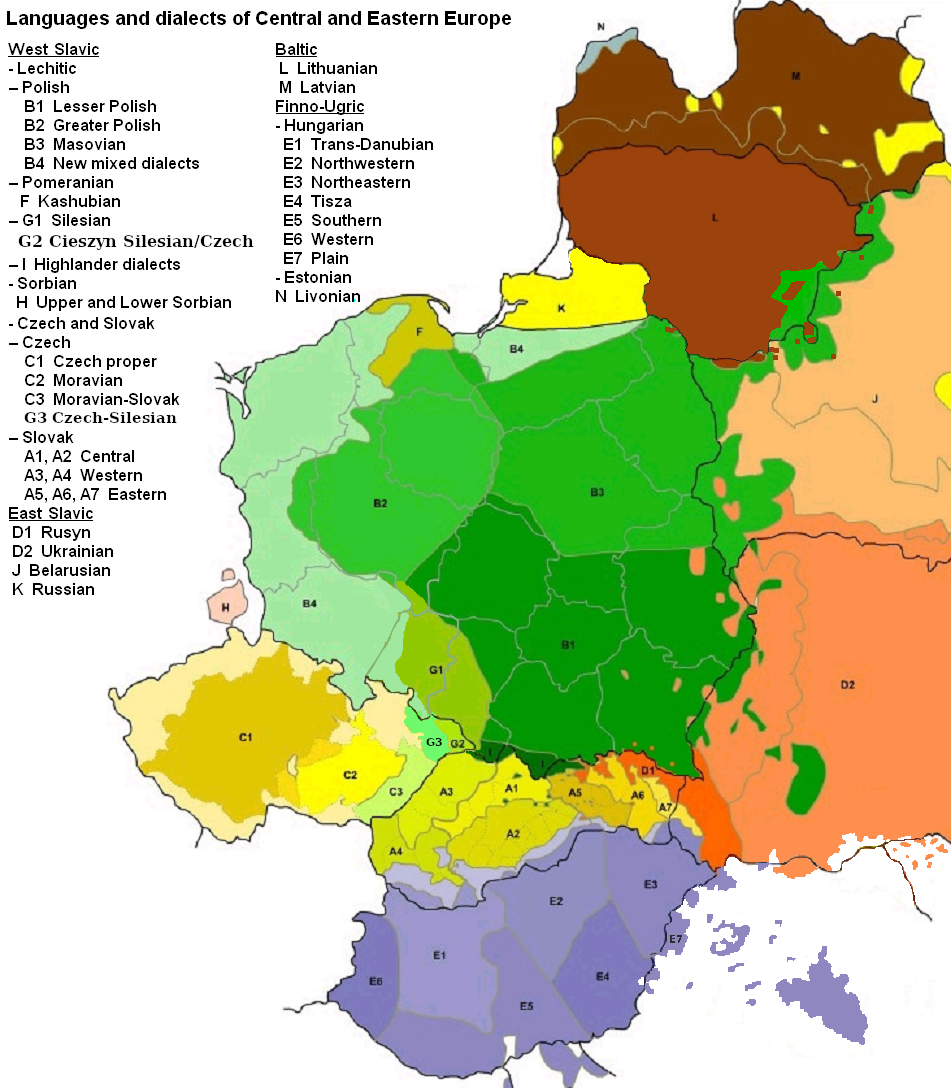
Geographical distribution of the Polish language (green) and other Central and Eastern European languages and dialects. A large Polish-speaking diaspora remains in the countries located east of Poland that were once the Eastern Borderlands of the Second Polish Republic (1918–1939).

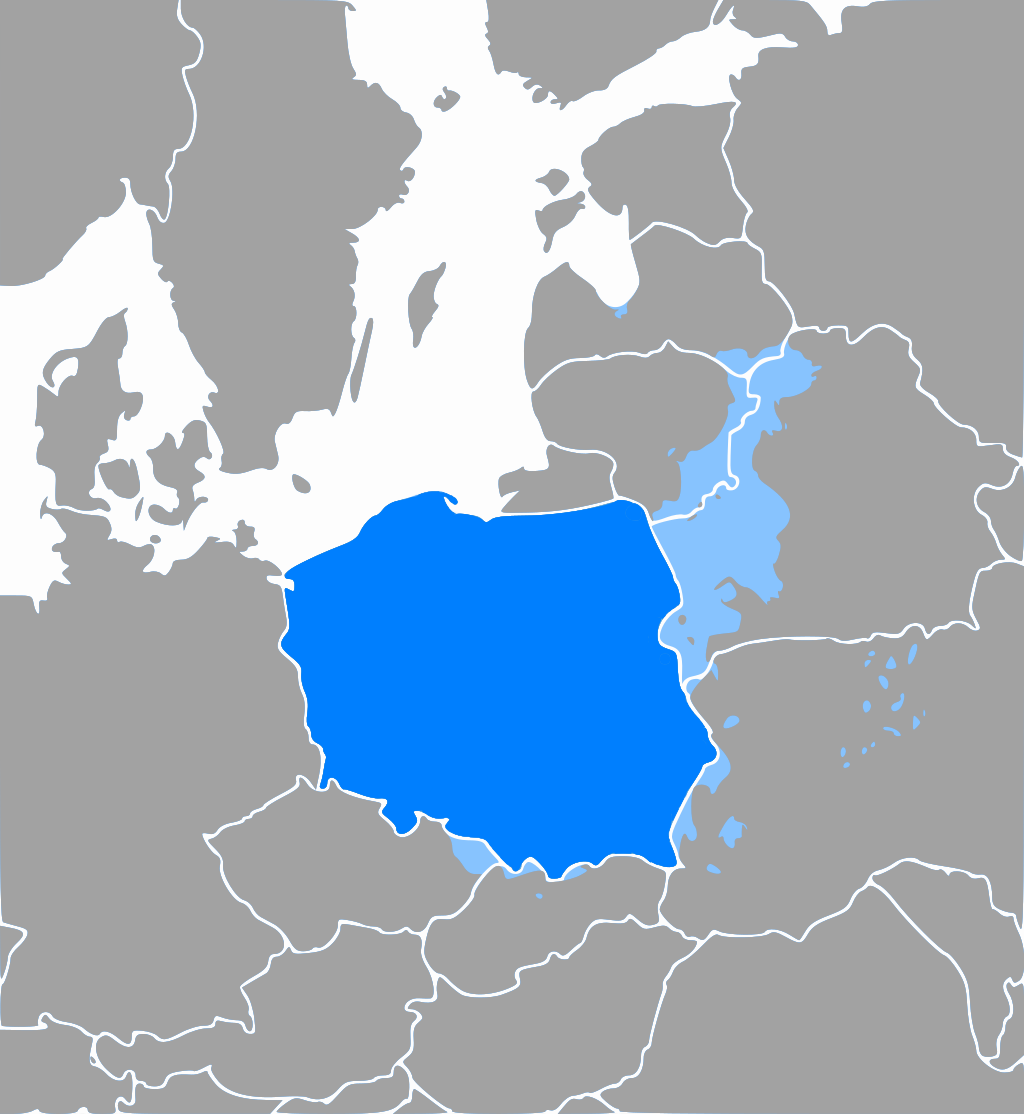
Knowledge of the Polish language within parts of Europe. Polish is not a majority language of any nation outside of Poland, though areas that speak and are majority Polish are present in some neighboring countries.

== Dialects ==
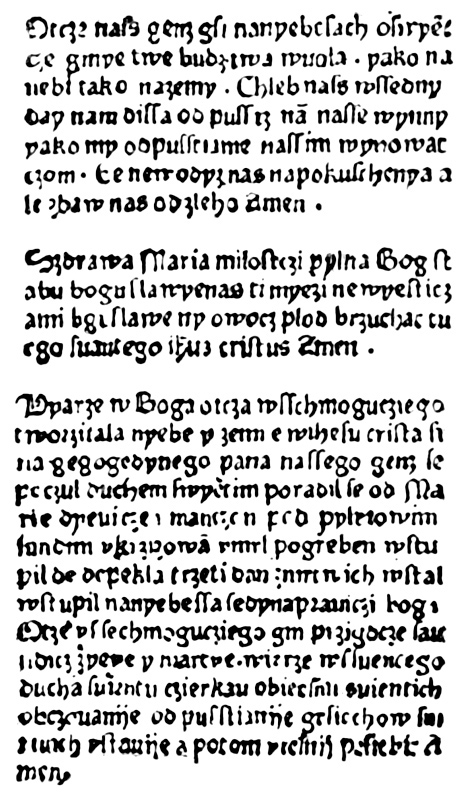
The oldest printed text in Polish – Statuta synodalia Episcoporum Wratislaviensis printed in 1475 in Wrocław by Kasper Elyan.

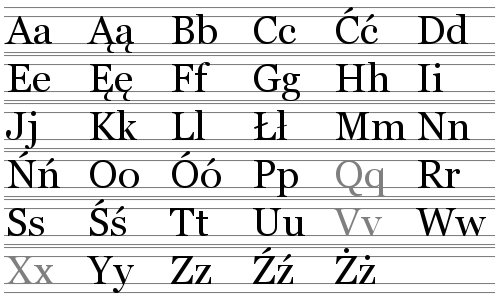
The Polish alphabet contains 32 letters. Q, V and X are not used in the Polish language.

The inhabitants of different regions of Poland still speak Polish somewhat differently, although the differences between modern-day vernacular varieties and standard Polish (język ogólnopolski) appear relatively slight. Most of the middle aged and young speak vernaculars close to standard Polish, while the traditional dialects are preserved among older people in rural areas. First-language speakers of Polish have no trouble understanding each other, and non-native speakers may have difficulty recognizing the regional and social differences. The modern standard dialect, often termed as "correct Polish", is spoken or at least understood throughout the entire country.

Polish has traditionally been described as consisting of three to five main regional dialects:

- Greater Polish, spoken in the west
- Lesser Polish, spoken in the south and southeast
- Masovian, spoken throughout the central and eastern parts of the country

Silesian and Kashubian, spoken in Upper Silesia and Pomerania respectively, are thought of as either Polish dialects or distinct languages, depending on the criteria used.

Kashubian contains a number of features not found elsewhere in Poland, e.g. nine distinct oral vowels (vs. the six of standard Polish) and (in the northern dialects) phonemic word stress, an archaic feature preserved from Common Slavic times and not found anywhere else among the West Slavic languages. However, it was described by some linguists as lacking most of the linguistic and social determinants of language-hood.

Many linguistic sources categorize Silesian as a regional language separate from Polish, while some consider Silesian to be a dialect of Polish. Many Silesians consider themselves a separate ethnicity and have been advocating for the recognition of Silesian as a regional language in Poland. The law recognizing it as such was passed by the Sejm and Senate in April 2024, but was vetoed by President Andrzej Duda in late May 2024.

According to the last official census in Poland in 2011, over half a million people declared Silesian as their native language. Many sociolinguists (e.g. Tomasz Kamusella, Agnieszka Pianka, Alfred F. Majewicz, Tomasz Wicherkiewicz) assume that extralinguistic criteria decide whether a lect is an independent language or a dialect: speakers of the speech variety or/and political decisions, and this is dynamic (i.e. it changes over time). Also, research organizations such as SIL International and resources for the academic field of linguistics such as Ethnologue, Linguist List and others, for example the Ministry of Administration and Digitization recognized the Silesian language. In July 2007, the Silesian language was recognized by ISO, and was attributed an ISO code of szl.

Some additional characteristic but less widespread regional dialects include:

1. The distinctive dialect of the Gorals (Góralski) occurs in the mountainous area bordering the Czech Republic and Slovakia. The Gorals ("Highlanders") take great pride in their culture and the dialect. It exhibits some cultural influences from the Vlach shepherds in the 14th–17th centuries.
2. The Poznański dialect, spoken in Poznań and to some extent in the whole region of the former Prussian Partition (excluding Upper Silesia), with noticeable German influences.
3. In the northern and western (formerly German) regions where Poles from the territories annexed by the Soviet Union resettled after World War II, the older generation speaks a dialect of Polish characteristic of the Kresy that includes a longer pronunciation of vowels.
4. Poles living in Lithuania (particularly in the Vilnius region), in Belarus (particularly the northwest), and in the northeast of Poland continue to speak the Eastern Borderlands dialect, which sounds "slushed" (in Polish described as zaciąganie z ruska, "speaking with a Ruthenian drawl") and is easily distinguishable.
5. Some city dwellers, especially the less affluent population, had their own distinctive dialects – for example, the Warsaw dialect, still spoken by some of the population of Praga on the eastern bank of the Vistula. However, these city dialects are now mostly extinct due to assimilation with standard Polish.
6. Many Poles living in emigrant communities (for example, in Brazil and the United States), whose families left Poland during the 20th century, retain a number of minor features of Polish vocabulary as spoken in the first half of that century that now sound archaic to contemporary visitors from Poland.

Polish linguistics has been characterized by a strong strive towards promoting prescriptive ideas of language intervention and usage uniformity, along with normatively oriented notions of language "correctness" (unusual by Western standards).

== Phonology ==
Spoken Polish in a neutral informative tone

A Polish speaker, recorded in Poland

=== Vowels ===
Polish has six oral vowels (seven oral vowels in written form), which are all monophthongs, and two nasal vowels. The oral vowels are /i/ (spelled i), /ɨ/ (spelled y and also transcribed as /ɘ/ or /ɪ/), /ɛ/ (spelled e), /a/ (spelled a), /ɔ/ (spelled o) and /u/ (spelled u and ó as separate letters). The nasal vowels are /ɛw̃/ (spelled ę) and /ɔw̃/ (spelled ą). Unlike Czech or Slovak, Polish does not retain phonemic vowel length — the letter ó, which formerly represented lengthened /ɔː/ in older forms of the language, is now vestigial and instead corresponds to /u/.

Polish oral vowels depicted on a vowel chart. Main allophones (in black) are in broad transcription, whereas positional allophones (in red and green) are in narrow transcription. Allophones with red dots appear in palatal contexts. The central vowel [ɐ] is an unstressed allophone of /ɛ, ɔ, a/ in certain contexts

	Front	Central	Back
Close	i	ɨ	u
Mid	ɛ		ɔ
Open		a	
Nasal diphthong	ɛw̃		ɔw̃

=== Consonants ===
The Polish consonant system shows more complexity: its characteristic features include the series of affricate and palatal consonants that resulted from four Proto-Slavic palatalizations and two further palatalizations that took place in Polish. The full set of consonants, together with their most common spellings, can be presented as follows (although other phonological analyses exist):

		Labial	Dental/ alveolar	Retroflex	(Alveolo-) palatal	Velar
Nasal		m	n		ɲ	(ŋ)
Plosive	voiceless	p	t			k
Plosive	voiced	b	d			ɡ
Affricate	voiceless		t͡s	t͡ʂ	t͡ɕ	
Affricate	voiced		d͡z	d͡ʐ	d͡ʑ	
Fricative	voiceless	f	s	ʂ	ɕ	x
Fricative	voiced	v	z	ʐ	ʑ	(ɣ)
Trill			r			
Approximant		w	l		j	w

Neutralization occurs between voiced–voiceless consonant pairs in certain environments, at the end of words (where devoicing occurs) and in certain consonant clusters (where assimilation occurs). For details, see Voicing and devoicing in the article on Polish phonology.

Most Polish words are paroxytones (that is, the stress falls on the second-to-last syllable of a polysyllabic word), although there are exceptions.

=== Consonant distribution ===
Polish permits complex consonant clusters, which historically often arose from the disappearance of yers. Polish can have word-initial and word-medial clusters of up to four consonants, whereas word-final clusters can have up to five consonants. Examples of such clusters can be found in words such as bezwzględny [bɛzˈvzɡlɛndnɨ] ('absolute' or 'heartless', 'ruthless'), źdźbło [ˈʑd͡ʑbwɔ] ('blade of grass'), wstrząs [ˈfstʂɔw̃s] ('shock'), and krnąbrność [ˈkrnɔmbrnɔɕt͡ɕ] ('disobedience'). A popular Polish tongue-twister (from a verse by Jan Brzechwa) is W Szczebrzeszynie chrząszcz brzmi w trzcinie [fʂt͡ʂɛbʐɛˈʂɨɲɛ ˈxʂɔw̃ʂt͡ʂ ˈbʐmi fˈtʂt͡ɕiɲɛ] ('In Szczebrzeszyn a beetle buzzes in the reed').

Unlike languages such as Czech, Polish does not have syllabic consonants – the nucleus of a syllable is always a vowel.

The consonant /j/ is restricted to positions adjacent to a vowel. It also cannot precede or follow the letter Y.

=== Prosody ===
The predominant stress pattern in Polish is penultimate stress – in a word of more than one syllable, the next-to-last syllable is stressed. Alternating preceding syllables carry secondary stress, e.g. in a four-syllable word, where the primary stress is on the third syllable, there will be secondary stress on the first.

Each vowel represents one syllable, although the letter i normally does not represent a vowel when it precedes another vowel (it represents /j/, palatalization of the preceding consonant, or both depending on analysis). Also the letters u and i sometimes represent only semivowels when they follow another vowel, as in autor /ˈawtɔr/ ('author'), mostly in loanwords (so not in native nauka /naˈu.ka/ 'science, the act of learning', for example, nor in nativized Mateusz /maˈte.uʂ/ 'Matthew').

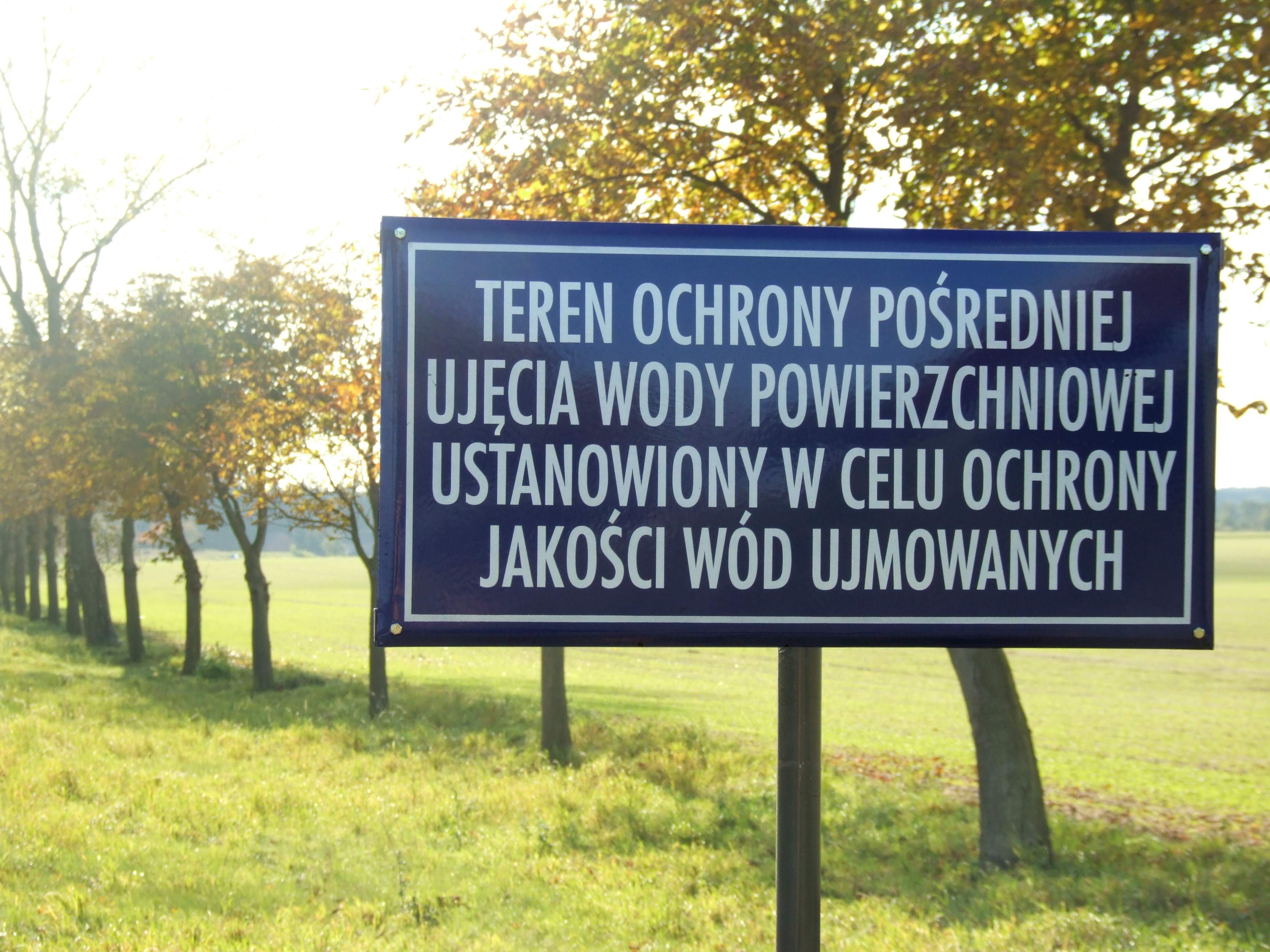
A formal-tone informative sign in Polish, with a composition of vowels and consonants and a mixture of long, medium and short syllables

Some loanwords, particularly from the classical languages, have the stress on the antepenultimate (third-from-last) syllable. For example, fizyka (/ˈfizɨka/) ('physics') is stressed on the first syllable. This may lead to a rare phenomenon of minimal pairs differing only in stress placement, for example muzyka /ˈmuzɨka/ 'music' vs. muzyka /muˈzɨka/ – genitive singular of muzyk 'musician'. When additional syllables are added to such words through inflection or suffixation, the stress normally becomes regular. For example, uniwersytet (/uɲiˈvɛrsɨtɛt/, 'university') has irregular stress on the third (or antepenultimate) syllable, but the genitive uniwersytetu (/uɲivɛrsɨˈtɛtu/) and derived adjective uniwersytecki (/uɲivɛrsɨˈtɛt͡skʲi/) have regular stress on the penultimate syllables. Loanwords generally become nativized to have penultimate stress. In psycholinguistic experiments, speakers of Polish have been demonstrated to be sensitive to the distinction between regular penultimate and exceptional antepenultimate stress.

Another class of exceptions is verbs with the conditional endings -by, -bym, -byśmy, etc. These endings are not counted in determining the position of the stress; for example, zrobiłbym ('I would do') is stressed on the first syllable, and zrobilibyśmy ('we would do') on the second. According to prescriptive authorities, the same applies to the first and second person plural past tense endings -śmy, -ście, although this rule is often ignored in colloquial speech (so zrobiliśmy 'we did' should be prescriptively stressed on the second syllable, although in practice it is commonly stressed on the third as zrobiliśmy). These irregular stress patterns are explained by the fact that these endings are detachable clitics rather than true verbal inflections: for example, instead of kogo zobaczyliście? ('whom did you see?') it is possible to say kogoście zobaczyli? – here kogo retains its usual stress (first syllable) in spite of the attachment of the clitic. Reanalysis of the endings as inflections when attached to verbs causes the different colloquial stress patterns. These stress patterns are considered part of a "usable" norm of standard Polish - in contrast to the "model" ("high") norm.

Some common word combinations are stressed as if they were a single word. This applies in particular to many combinations of preposition plus a personal pronoun, such as do niej ('to her'), na nas ('on us'), przeze mnie ('because of me'), all stressed on the bolded syllable.

== Orthography ==
The Polish alphabet derives from the Latin script but includes certain additional letters formed using diacritics. The Polish alphabet was one of three major forms of Latin-based orthography developed for Western and some South Slavic languages, the others being Czech orthography and Croatian orthography, the last of these being a 19th-century invention trying to make a compromise between the first two. Kashubian uses a Polish-based system, Slovak uses a Czech-based system, and Slovene follows the Croatian one; the Sorbian languages blend the Polish and the Czech ones.

Historically, Poland's once diverse and multi-ethnic population utilized many forms of scripture to write Polish. For instance, Lipka Tatars and Muslims inhabiting the eastern parts of the former Polish–Lithuanian Commonwealth wrote Polish in the Arabic alphabet. The Cyrillic script is used to a certain extent today by Polish speakers in Western Belarus, especially for religious texts.

The diacritics used in the Polish alphabet are the kreska (graphically similar to the acute accent) over the letters ć, ń, ó, ś, ź and through the letter in ł; the kropka (superior dot) over the letter ż, and the ogonek ("little tail") under the letters ą, ę. The letters q, v, x are used only in foreign words and names.

Polish orthography is largely phonemic—there is a consistent correspondence between letters (or digraphs and trigraphs) and phonemes (for exceptions see below). The letters of the alphabet and their normal phonemic values are listed in the following table.

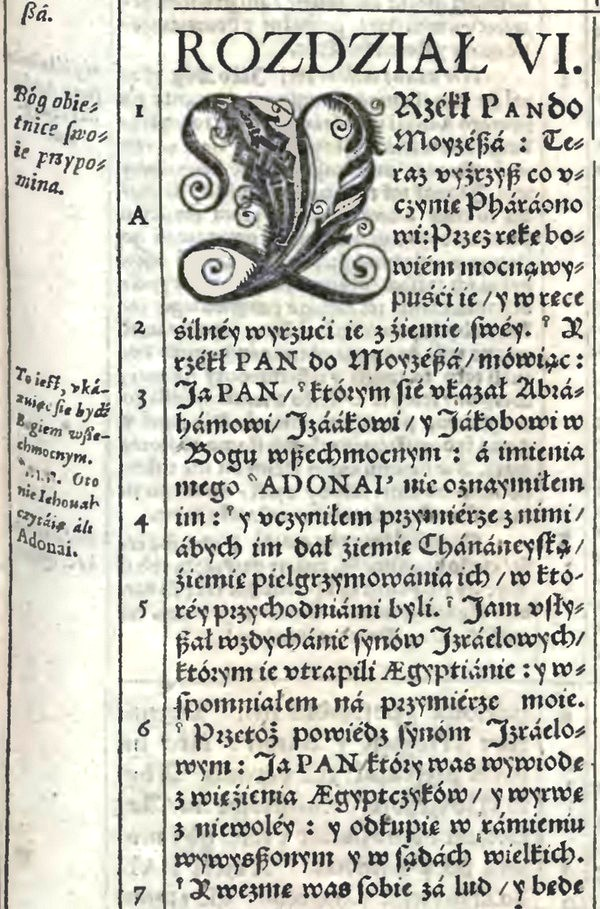
The Jakub Wujek Bible in Polish, 1599 print. The letters á and é were subsequently abolished, but survive in Czech.

Upper case	Lower case	Phonemic value(s)	Upper case	Lower case	Phonemic value(s)
A	a	/a/	Ń	ń	/ɲ/
Ą	ą	/ɔ̃/, [ɔn], [ɔm]	O	o	/ɔ/
B	b	/b/ (/p/)	Ó	ó	/u/
C	c	/ts/	P	p	/p/
Ć	ć	/tɕ/	Q	q	Only loanwords
D	d	/d/ (/t/)	R	r	/r/
E	e	/ɛ/	S	s	/s/
Ę	ę	/ɛ̃/, [ɛn], [ɛm], /ɛ/	Ś	ś	/ɕ/
F	f	/f/	T	t	/t/
G	g	/ɡ/ (/k/)	U	u	/u/
H	h	/x/ (/ɣ/)	V	v	Only loanwords
I	i	/i/, /j/	W	w	/v/ (/f/)
J	j	/j/	X	x	Only loanwords
K	k	/k/	Y	y	/ɨ/, /ɘ/
L	l	/l/	Z	z	/z/ (/s/)
Ł	ł	/w/, /ɫ/	Ź	ź	/ʑ/ (/ɕ/)
M	m	/m/	Ż	ż	/ʐ/ (/ʂ/)
N	n	/n/			

The following digraphs and trigraphs are used:

Digraph	Phonemic value(s)	Digraph/trigraph (before a vowel)	Phonemic value(s)
ch	/x/	ci	/tɕ/
cz	/tʂ/	dzi	/dʑ/
dz	/dz/ (/ts/)	gi	/ɡʲ/
dź	/dʑ/ (/tɕ/)	(c)hi	/xʲ/
dż	/dʐ/ (/tʂ/)	ki	/kʲ/
rz	/ʐ/ (/ʂ/)	ni	/ɲ/
sz	/ʂ/	si	/ɕ/
		zi	/ʑ/

Voiced consonant letters frequently come to represent voiceless sounds (as shown in the tables); this occurs at the end of words and in certain clusters, due to the neutralization mentioned in the Phonology section above. Occasionally also voiceless consonant letters can represent voiced sounds in clusters.

The spelling rule for the palatal sounds /ɕ/, /ʑ/, /tɕ/, /dʑ/ and /ɲ/ is as follows: before the vowel i the plain letters s, z, c, dz, n are used; before other vowels the combinations si, zi, ci, dzi, ni are used; when not followed by a vowel the diacritic forms ś, ź, ć, dź, ń are used. For example, the s in siwy ("grey-haired"), the si in siarka ("sulfur") and the ś in święty ("holy") all represent the sound /ɕ/. The exceptions to the above rule are certain loanwords from Latin, Italian, French, Russian or English—where s before i is pronounced as s, e.g. sinus, sinologia, do re mi fa sol la si do, Saint-Simon i saint-simoniści, Sierioża, Siergiej, Singapur, singiel. In other loanwords the vowel i is changed to y, e.g. asymilacja.

The following table shows the correspondence between the sounds and spelling:

Digraphs and trigraphs are used:

Phonemic value	Single letter/Digraph (in pausa or before a consonant)	Digraph/Trigraph (before a vowel)	Single letter/Digraph (before the vowel i)
/tɕ/	ć	ci	c
/dʑ/	dź	dzi	dz
/ɕ/	ś	si	s
/ʑ/	ź	zi	z
/ɲ/	ń	ni	n

Similar principles apply to /kʲ/, /ɡʲ/, /xʲ/ and /lʲ/, except that these can only occur before vowels, so the spellings are k, g, (c)h, l before i, and ki, gi, (c)hi, li otherwise. Most Polish speakers, however, do not consider palatalization of k, g, (c)h or l as creating new sounds.

Except in the cases mentioned above, the letter i if followed by another vowel in the same word usually represents /j/, yet a palatalization of the previous consonant is always assumed.

The reverse case, where the consonant remains unpalatalized but is followed by a palatalized consonant, is written by using j instead of i: for example, zjeść, "to eat up".

The letters ą and ę, when followed by plosives and affricates, represent an oral vowel followed by a nasal consonant, rather than a nasal vowel. For example, ą in dąb ("oak") is pronounced [ɔm], and ę in tęcza ("rainbow") is pronounced [ɛn] (the nasal assimilates to the following consonant). When followed by l or ł (for example przyjęli, przyjęły), ę is pronounced as just e. When ę is at the end of the word it is often pronounced as just [ɛ].

Depending on the word, the phoneme /x/ can be spelt h or ch, the phoneme /ʐ/ can be spelt ż or rz, and /u/ can be spelt u or ó. In several cases it determines the meaning, for example: może ("maybe") and morze ("sea").

In occasional words, letters that normally form a digraph are pronounced separately. For example, rz represents /rz/, not /ʐ/, in words like zamarzać ("freeze") and in the name Tarzan.

Doubled letters are usually pronounced as a single, lengthened consonant, however, some speakers might pronounce the combination as two separate sounds.

There are certain clusters where a written consonant would not be pronounced. For example, the ł in the word jabłko ("apple") might be omitted in ordinary speech, leading to the pronunciation japko.

== Grammar ==
Polish is a highly fusional language with relatively free word order, although the dominant arrangement is subject–verb–object (SVO). There are no articles, and subject pronouns are often dropped.

Nouns belong to one of three genders: masculine, feminine and neuter. The masculine gender is also divided into subgenders: animate vs inanimate in the singular, human vs nonhuman in the plural. There are seven cases: nominative, genitive, dative, accusative, instrumental, locative and vocative.

Adjectives agree with nouns in terms of gender, case, and number. Attributive adjectives most commonly precede the noun, although in certain cases, especially in fixed phrases (like język polski, "Polish (language)"), the noun may come first; the rule of thumb is that generic descriptive adjectives normally precede (e.g. piękny kwiat, "beautiful flower") while categorizing adjectives often follow the noun (e.g. węgiel kamienny, "black coal"). Most short adjectives and their derived adverbs form comparatives and superlatives by inflection (the superlative is formed by prefixing naj- to the comparative).

Verbs are of imperfective or perfective aspect, often occurring in pairs. Imperfective verbs have a present tense, past tense, compound future tense (except for być "to be", which has a simple future będę etc., this in turn being used to form the compound future of other verbs), subjunctive/conditional (formed with the detachable particle by), imperatives, an infinitive, present participle, present gerund and past participle. Perfective verbs have a simple future tense (formed like the present tense of imperfective verbs), past tense, subjunctive/conditional, imperatives, infinitive, present gerund and past participle. Conjugated verb forms agree with their subject in terms of person, number, and (in the case of past tense and subjunctive/conditional forms) gender.

Passive-type constructions can be made using the auxiliary być or zostać ("become") with the passive participle. There is also an impersonal construction where the active verb is used (in third person singular) with no subject, but with the reflexive pronoun się present to indicate a general, unspecified subject (as in pije się wódkę "vodka is being drunk"—note that wódka appears in the accusative). A similar sentence type in the past tense uses the passive participle with the ending -o, as in widziano ludzi ("people were seen"). As in other Slavic languages, there are also subjectless sentences formed using such words as można ("it is possible") together with an infinitive.

Yes–no questions (both direct and indirect) are formed by placing the word czy ("whether") at the start, although it's often omitted in casual speech. Negation uses the word nie, before the verb or other item being negated; nie is still added before the verb even if the sentence also contains other negatives such as nigdy ("never") or nic ("nothing"), effectively creating a double negative.

Cardinal numbers have a complex system of inflection and agreement. Zero and cardinal numbers higher than five (except for those ending with the digit 2, 3 or 4 but not ending with 12, 13 or 14) govern the genitive case rather than the nominative or accusative. Special forms of numbers (collective numerals) are used with certain classes of noun, which include dziecko ("child") and exclusively plural nouns such as drzwi ("door").

== Borrowed words ==
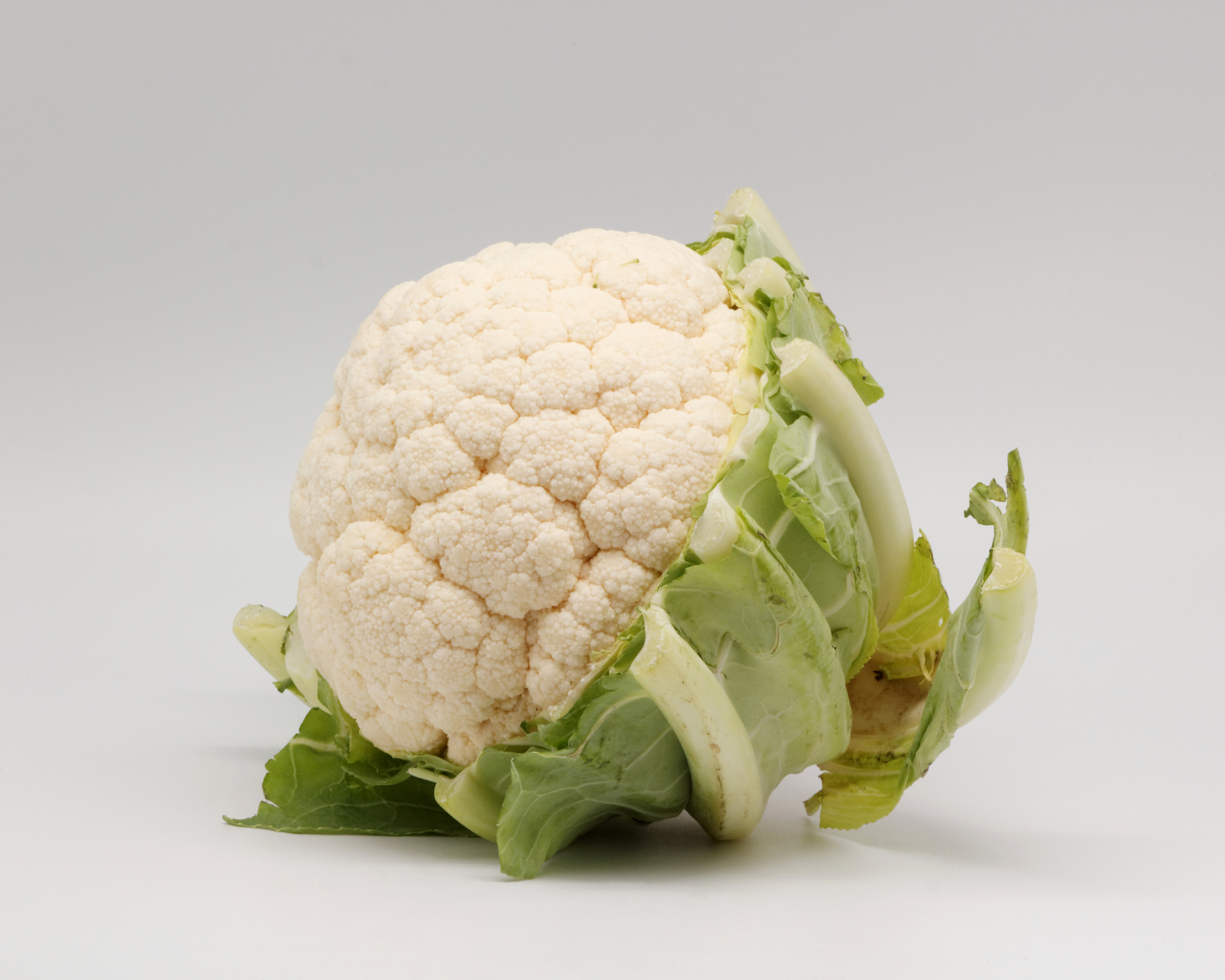
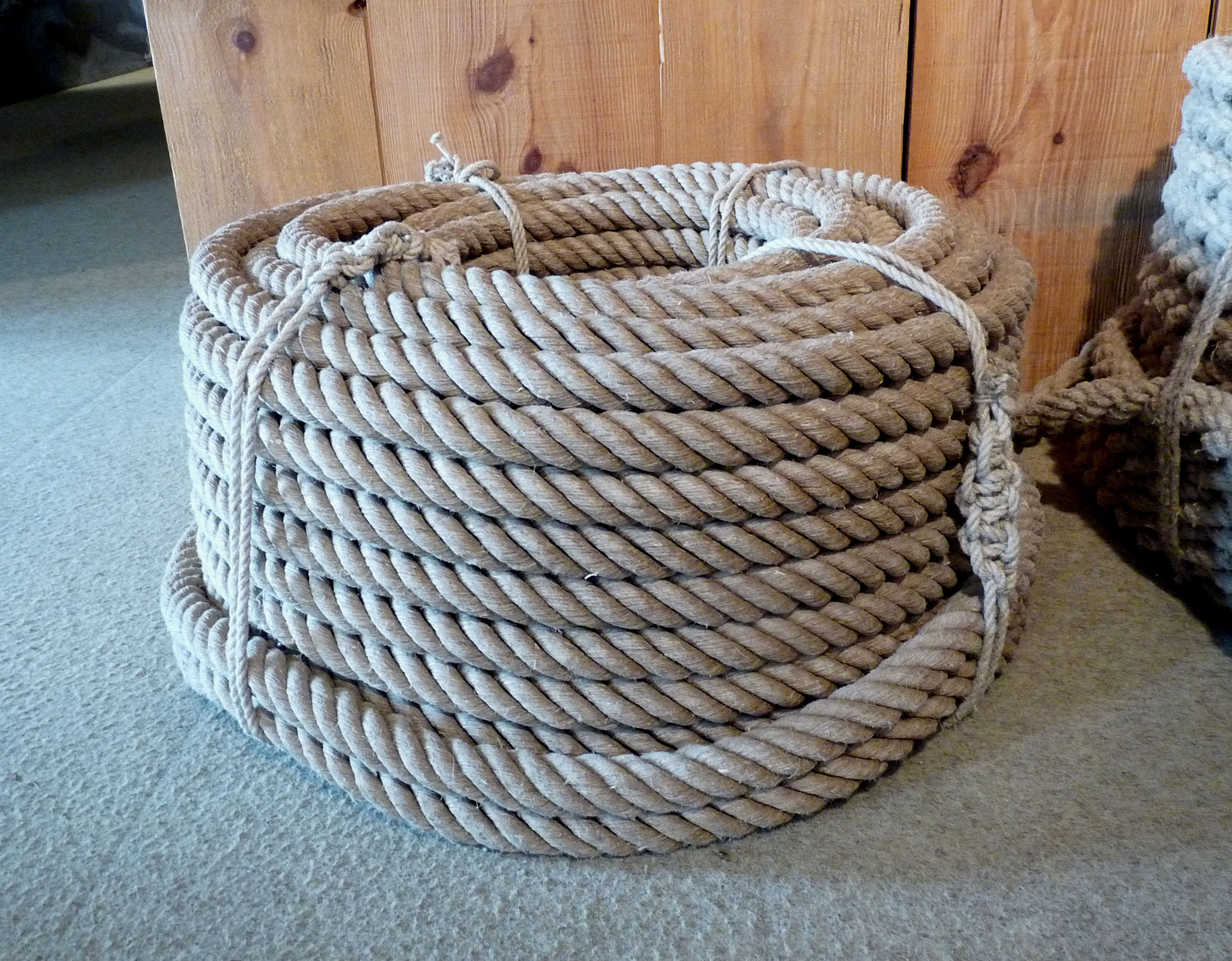
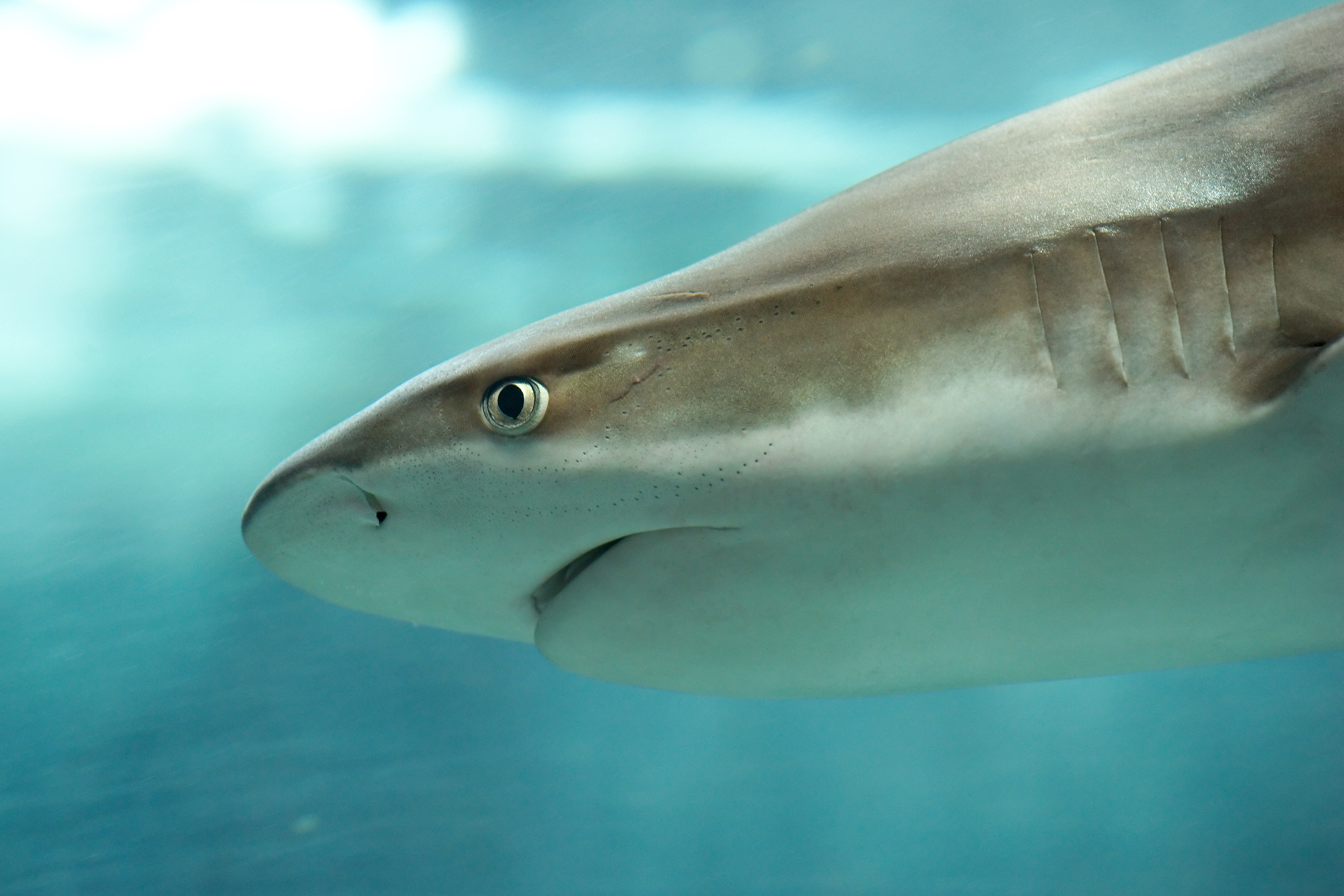
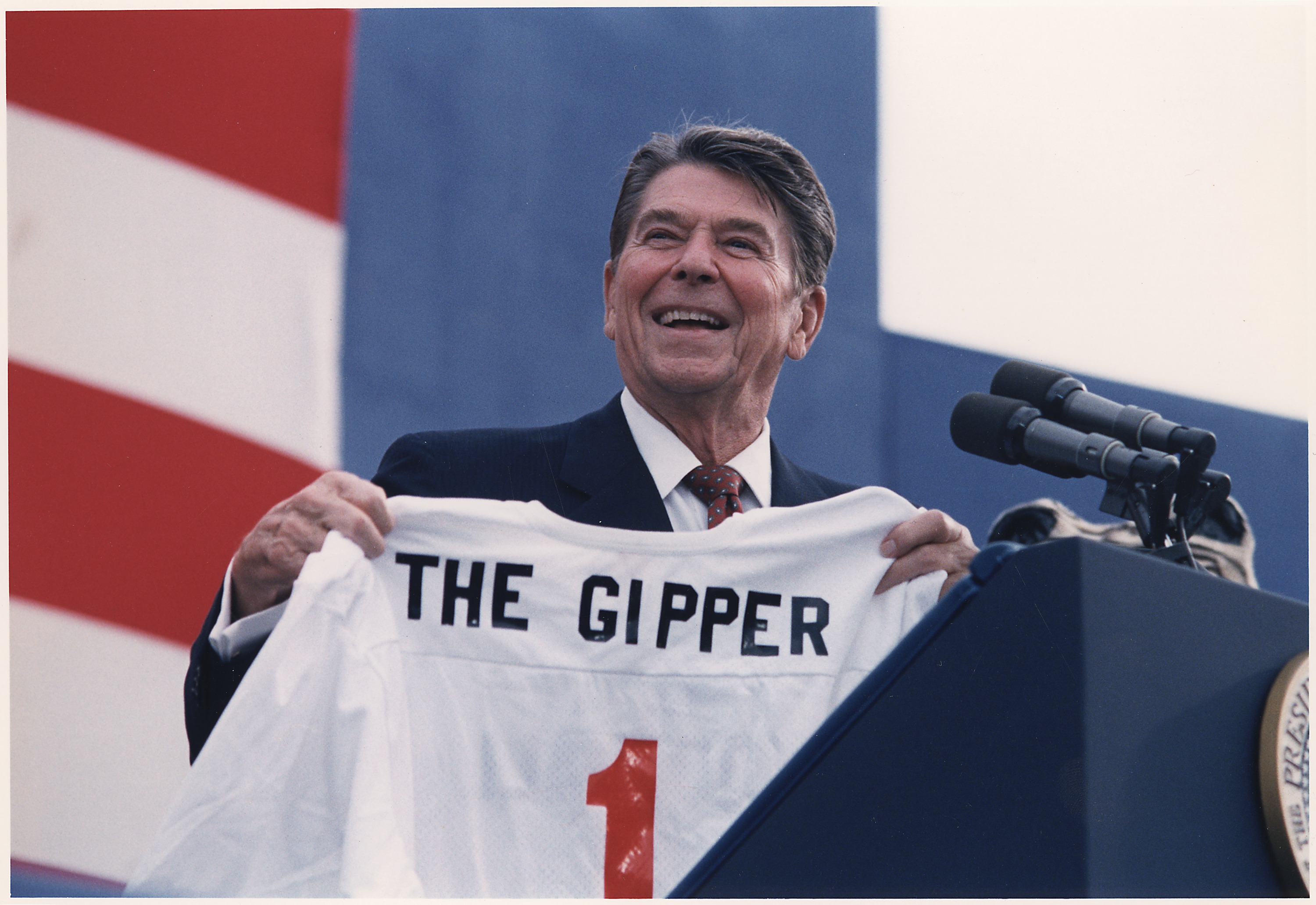
Poland was once a multi-ethnic nation with many minorities that contributed to the Polish language.
1. Top left: cauliflower (Polish kalafior from Italian cavolfiore).
2. Top right: rope (sznur from German Schnur).
3. Bottom left: shark (rekin from French requin).
4. Bottom right: nickname (ksywa (colloquial) from Yiddish כּתיבֿה ksive)

Polish has, over the centuries, borrowed a number of words from other languages. When borrowing, pronunciation was adapted to Polish phonemes and spelling was altered to match Polish orthography. In addition, word endings are liberally applied to almost any word to produce verbs, nouns, adjectives, as well as adding the appropriate endings for cases of nouns, adjectives, diminutives, double-diminutives, augmentatives, etc.

Depending on the historical period, borrowing has proceeded from various languages. Notable influences have been Latin (10th–18th centuries), Czech (10th and 14th–15th centuries), Italian (16th–17th centuries), French (17th–19th centuries), German (13–15th and 18th–20th centuries), Hungarian (15th–16th centuries) and Turkish (17th century). Currently, English words are the most common imports to Polish.

Loanwords make up 26.2% of the Polish vocabulary, with 36.3% originating from Latin, 19.7% from German, 15.9% from French, 7.1% from Czech, 3.8% from Greek, 3.5% from English, 3.1% from Italian, 1.9% from Ukrainian and Belarusian, 1.4% from Russian, and 1.5% from other languages; 5.9% are artificial borrowings (usually compound words of undetermined origin).

The Latin language, for a very long time the only official language of the Polish state, has had a great influence on Polish. Many Polish words were direct borrowings or calques (e.g. rzeczpospolita from res publica) from Latin. Latin was known to a larger or smaller degree by most of the numerous szlachta in the 16th to 18th centuries (and it continued to be extensively taught at secondary schools until World War II). Apart from dozens of loanwords, its influence can also be seen in a number of verbatim Latin phrases in Polish literature (especially from the 19th century and earlier). During the 12th and 13th centuries, Mongolian words were brought to the Polish language during wars with the armies of Genghis Khan and his descendants, e.g. dzida (spear) and szereg (a line or row).

Words from Czech, an important influence during the 10th and 14th–15th centuries include sejm ('parliament'), manele (slang for 'oddments'), myszygene (slang for 'lunatic'), pinda (slang for 'girl, pejoratively'), plajta (slang for 'bankruptcy'), rejwach ('noise'), szmal (slang for 'money'), and trefny ('dodgy').

The mountain dialects of the Górale in southern Poland, have quite a number of words borrowed from Hungarian (e.g., baca, gazda, juhas, hejnał) and Romanian as a result of historical contacts with Hungarian-dominated Slovakia and Wallachian herders who travelled north along the Carpathians.

Thieves' slang includes such words as kimać ('to sleep') or majcher ('knife') of Greek origin, considered then unknown to the outside world.

In addition, Turkish and Tatar have exerted influence upon the vocabulary of war, names of oriental costumes etc. Russian borrowings began to make their way into Polish from the second half of the 19th century on.

Polish has also received a great number of English loanwords, particularly after World War II. Recent loanwords come primarily from the English language, mainly those that have Latin or Greek roots, for example komputer ('computer'), korupcja (from corruption, but sense restricted to 'bribery'), etc. Concatenation of parts of words (e.g., auto-moto), which is not native to Polish but common in English, for example, is also sometimes used. When borrowing English words, Polish often changes their spelling. For example, the Latin suffix '-tio' corresponds to -cja. To make the word plural, -cja becomes -cje. Examples of this include inauguracja ('inauguration'), dewastacja ('devastation'), recepcja ('reception'), konurbacja ('conurbation') and konotacje ('connotations'). Also, the digraph qu becomes kw: kwadrant ('quadrant'), kworum ('quorum').

== Loanwords from Polish in other languages ==
There are numerous words in both Polish and Yiddish (Jewish) languages which are near-identical due to the large Jewish minority that once inhabited Poland. One example is the fishing rod, ווענטקע (ventke), borrowed directly from Polish wędka.

The Polish language has influenced others. Particular influences appear in other Slavic languages and in German — due to their proximity and shared borders. Examples of loanwords include German Grenze ('border'), Dutch and Afrikaans grens from Polish granica; German Peitzker from Polish piskorz ('weatherfish'); German Zobel, French zibeline, Swedish sobel, and English sable from Polish soból; and ogonek (literally "little tail") — the word describing a diacritic hook-sign added below some letters in various alphabets. The common Germanic word quartz comes from the dialectal Old Polish kwardy. The word szmata, a Polish, Slovak and Ruthenian word for "mop" or "rag", became part of Yiddish. The Polish language exerted significant lexical influence upon Ukrainian, particularly in the fields of abstract and technical terminology; for example, the Ukrainian word панство panstvo ('country') is derived from Polish państwo. The Polish influence on Ukrainian is particularly marked on western Ukrainian dialects in western Ukraine, which for centuries was under Polish cultural domination.

There are a substantial number of Polish words which officially became part of Yiddish, once the main language of European Jews. These include basic items, objects or terms such as a bread bun (Polish bułka, Yiddish בולקע bulke), a fishing rod (wędka, ווענטקע ventke), an oak (dąb, דעמב demb), a meadow (łąka, לאָנקע lonke), a moustache (wąsy, וואָנצעס vontses) and a bladder (pęcherz, פּענכער penkher).

Quite a few culinary loanwords exist in German and in other languages, some of which describe distinctive features of Polish cuisine. These include German and English Quark from twaróg (a kind of fresh cheese) and German Gurke, English gherkin from ogórek ('cucumber'). The word pierogi (Polish dumplings) has spread internationally, as has pączki (Polish donuts) and kiełbasa ('sausage', e.g., kolbaso in Esperanto). As far as pierogi concerned, the original Polish word is already in plural (sing. pieróg, plural pierogi; stem pierog-, plural ending -i; NB. o becomes ó in a closed syllable, like here in singular), yet it is commonly given the English plural ending -s in Canada and the United States, yielding pierogis—a "double plural". A similar phenonemon occurred with the Polish loanword from English czipsy ('potato chips')—from English chips, which was already plural (chip + -s)—which has obtained the Polish plural ending -y. (Note: However, the word chip (or in the Polish spelling: czip; in the plural – chipy or czipy) in Polish means only an integrated circuit.)

It is believed that the English word spruce was derived from Prusy, the Polish name for the region of Prussia. It became spruce because in Polish, z Prus, sounded like "spruce" in English (transl. "from Prussia") and was a generic term for commodities brought to England by Hanseatic merchants and because the tree was believed to have come from Polish Ducal Prussia. However, it can be argued that the word is actually derived from the Old French term Pruce, meaning literally Prussia.

== Literature ==
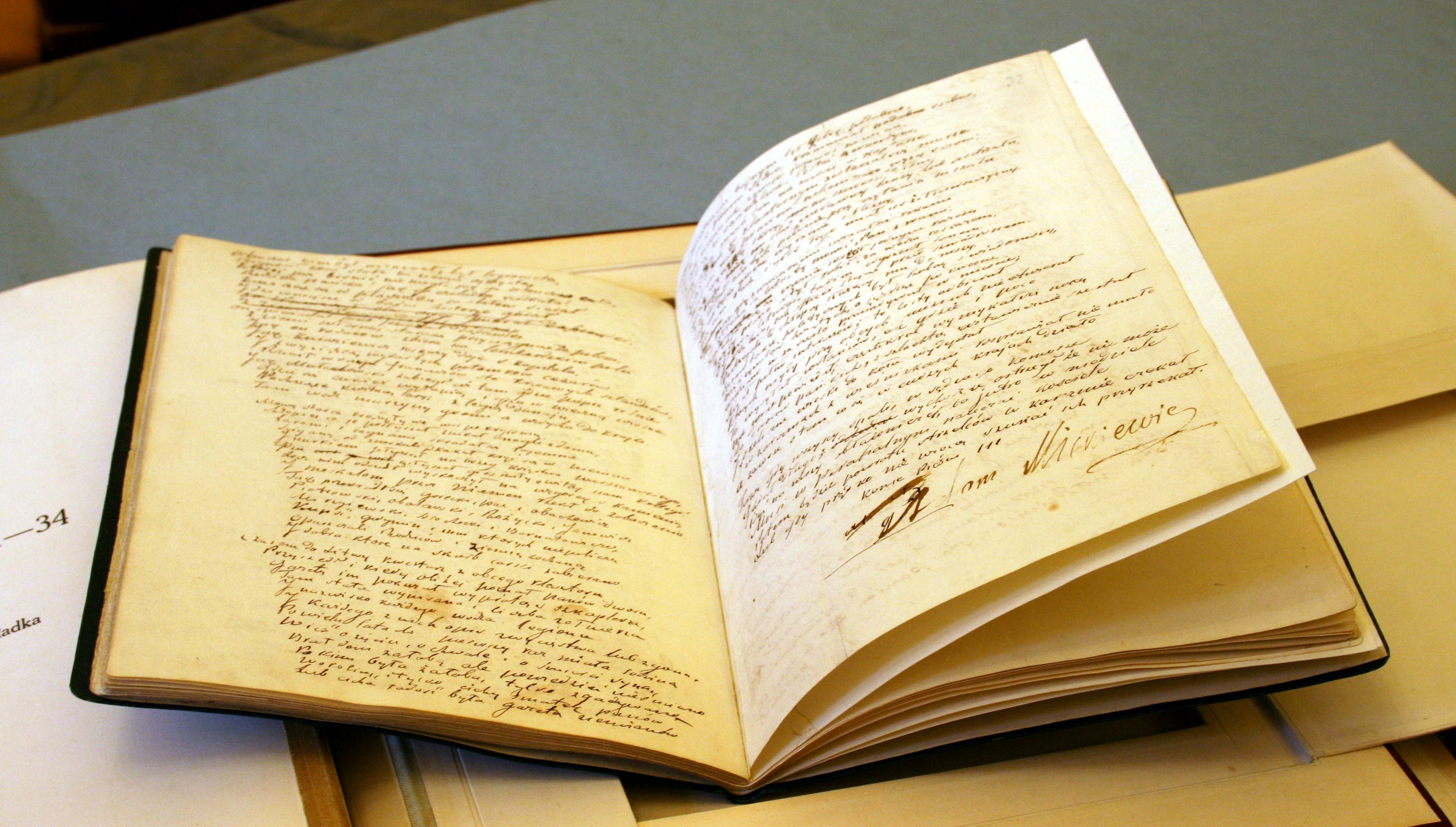
The manuscript of Pan Tadeusz held at Ossolineum in Wrocław. Adam Mickiewicz's signature is visible.

The Polish language started to be used in literature in the Late Middle Ages. Notable works include the Holy Cross Sermons (13th/14th century), Bogurodzica (15th century) and Master Polikarp's Dialog with Death (15th century). The most influential Renaissance-era literary figures in Poland were poet Jan Kochanowski (Laments), Mikołaj Rej and Piotr Skarga (The Lives of the Saints) who established poetic patterns that would become integral to the Polish literary language and laid foundations for modern Polish grammar. During the Age of Enlightenment in Poland, Ignacy Krasicki, known as "the Prince of Poets", wrote the first Polish novel, The Adventures of Mr. Nicholas Wisdom as well as Fables and Parables. Another significant work form this period is The Manuscript Found in Saragossa by Jan Potocki.

In the Romantic Era, the most celebrated national poets, referred to as the Three Bards, were Adam Mickiewicz (Pan Tadeusz and Dziady), Juliusz Słowacki (Balladyna) and Zygmunt Krasiński (The Undivine Comedy). Poet and dramatist Cyprian Norwid is regarded by some scholars as the "Fourth Bard". Important positivist writers include Bolesław Prus (The Doll, Pharaoh), Henryk Sienkiewicz (author of numerous historical novels, the most internationally acclaimed of which is Quo Vadis), Maria Konopnicka (Rota), Eliza Orzeszkowa (Nad Niemnem), Adam Asnyk and Gabriela Zapolska (The Morality of Mrs. Dulska). The period known as Young Poland produced such renowned literary figures as Stanisław Wyspiański (The Wedding), Stefan Żeromski (Homeless People, The Spring to Come), Władysław Reymont (The Peasants) and Leopold Staff. The prominent interbellum period authors include Maria Dąbrowska (Nights and Days), Stanisław Ignacy Witkiewicz (Insatiability), Julian Tuwim, Bruno Schulz, Bolesław Leśmian, Witold Gombrowicz and Zuzanna Ginczanka.

Other notable writers and poets from Poland active during World War II and after are Aleksander Kamiński, Zbigniew Herbert, Stanisław Lem, Zofia Nałkowska, Tadeusz Borowski, Sławomir Mrożek, Krzysztof Kamil Baczyński, Julia Hartwig, Marek Krajewski, Joanna Bator, Andrzej Sapkowski, Adam Zagajewski, Dorota Masłowska, Jerzy Pilch, Ryszard Kapuściński and Andrzej Stasiuk.

Five people writing in the Polish language have been awarded the Nobel Prize in Literature: Henryk Sienkiewicz (1905), Władysław Reymont (1924), Czesław Miłosz (1980), Wisława Szymborska (1996) and Olga Tokarczuk (2018).

Notable Polish language authors
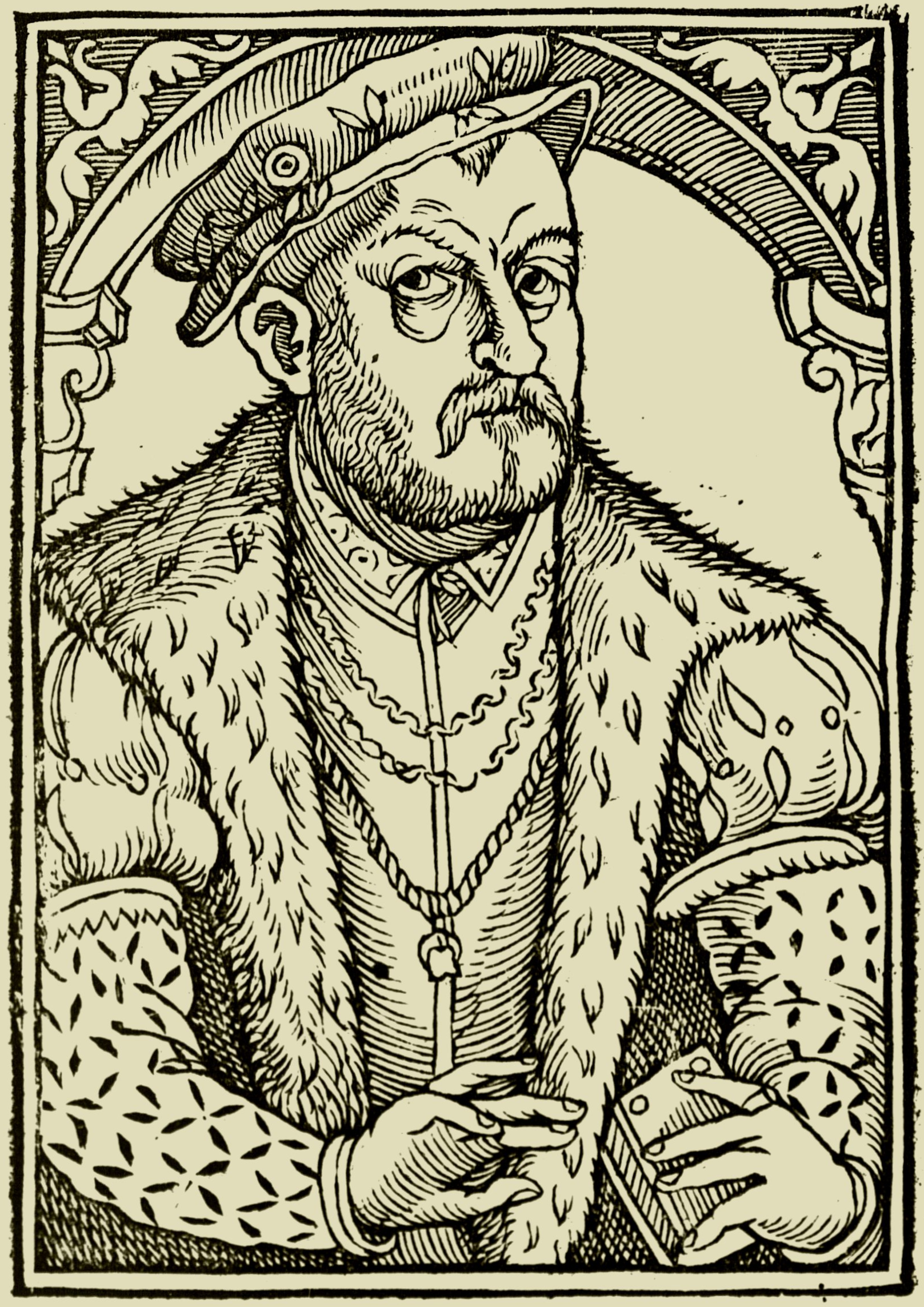
Mikołaj
Rej
(1505–1569)

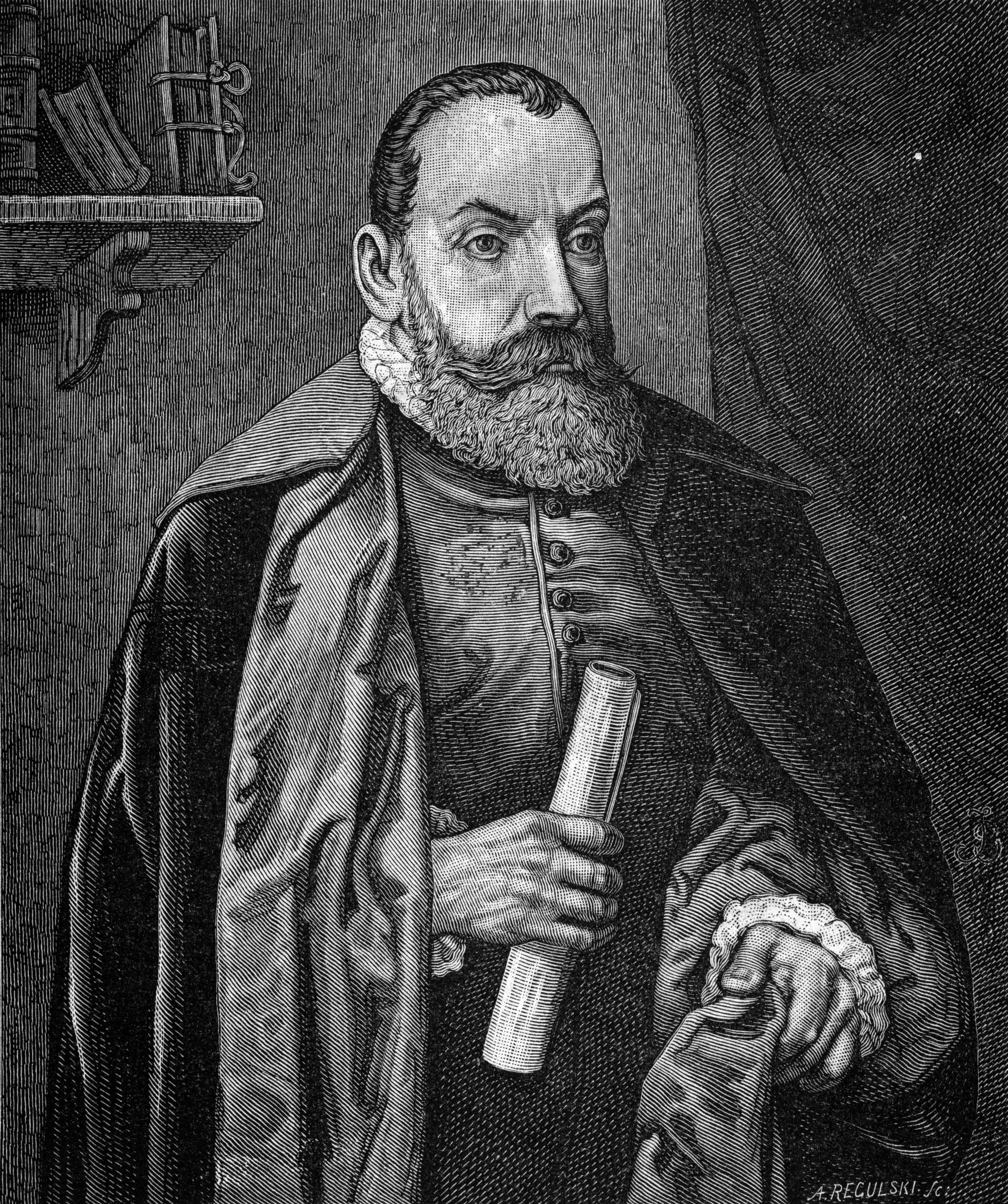
Jan
Kochanowski
(1530–1584)

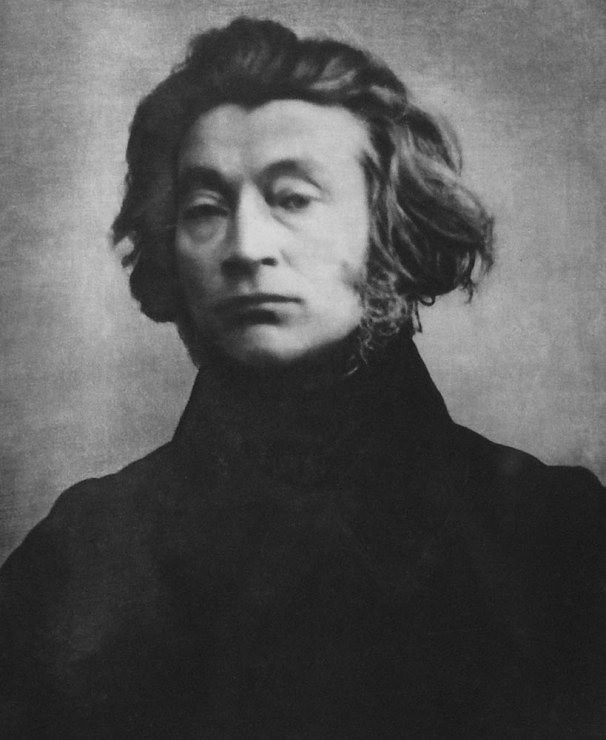
Adam
Mickiewicz
(1798–1855)

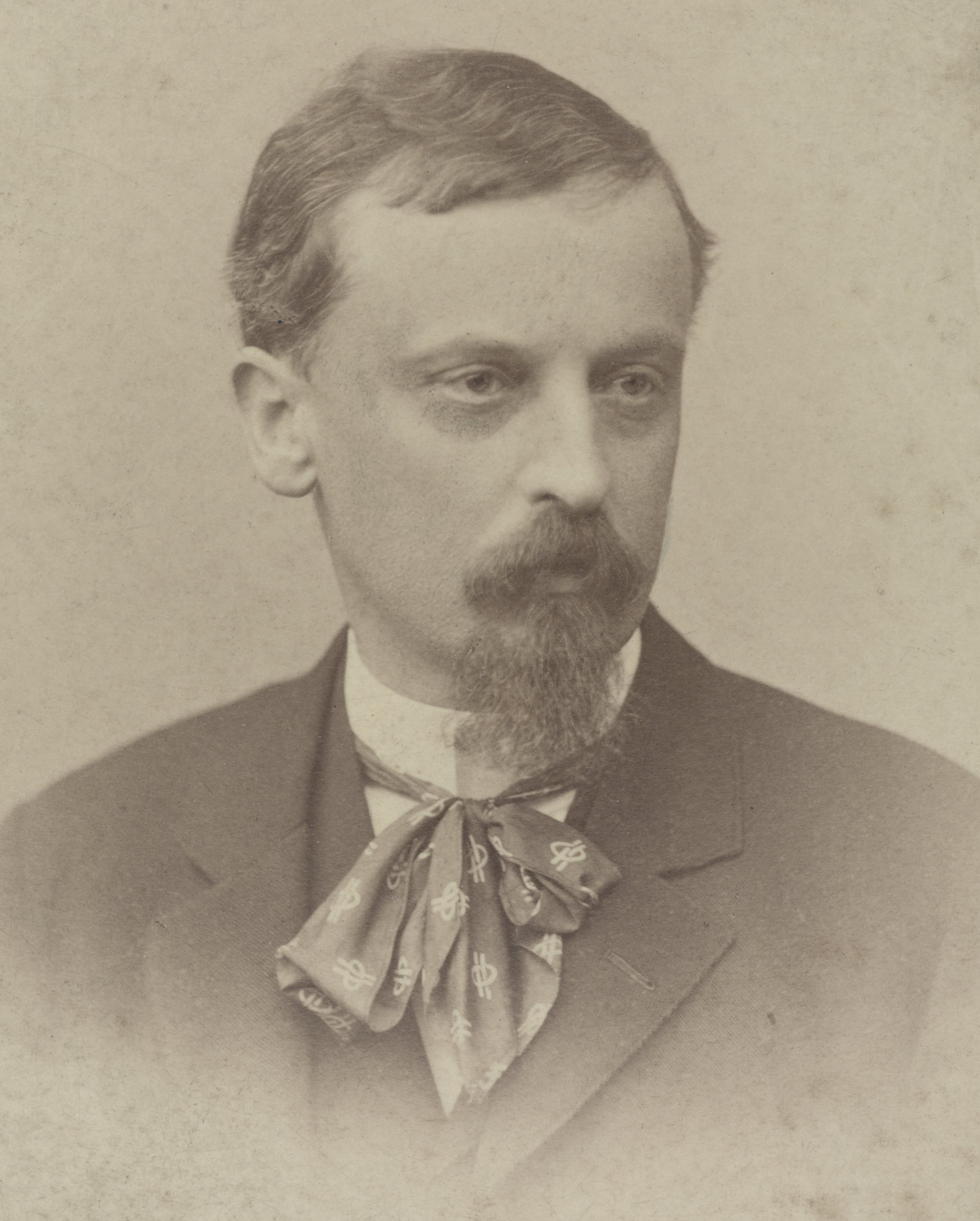
Henryk
Sienkiewicz
(1846–1916)

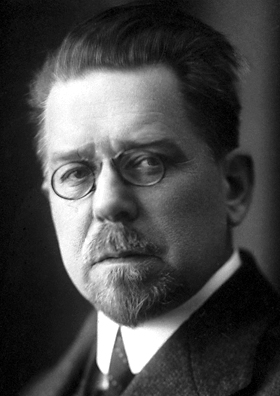
Władysław
Reymont
(1867–1925)

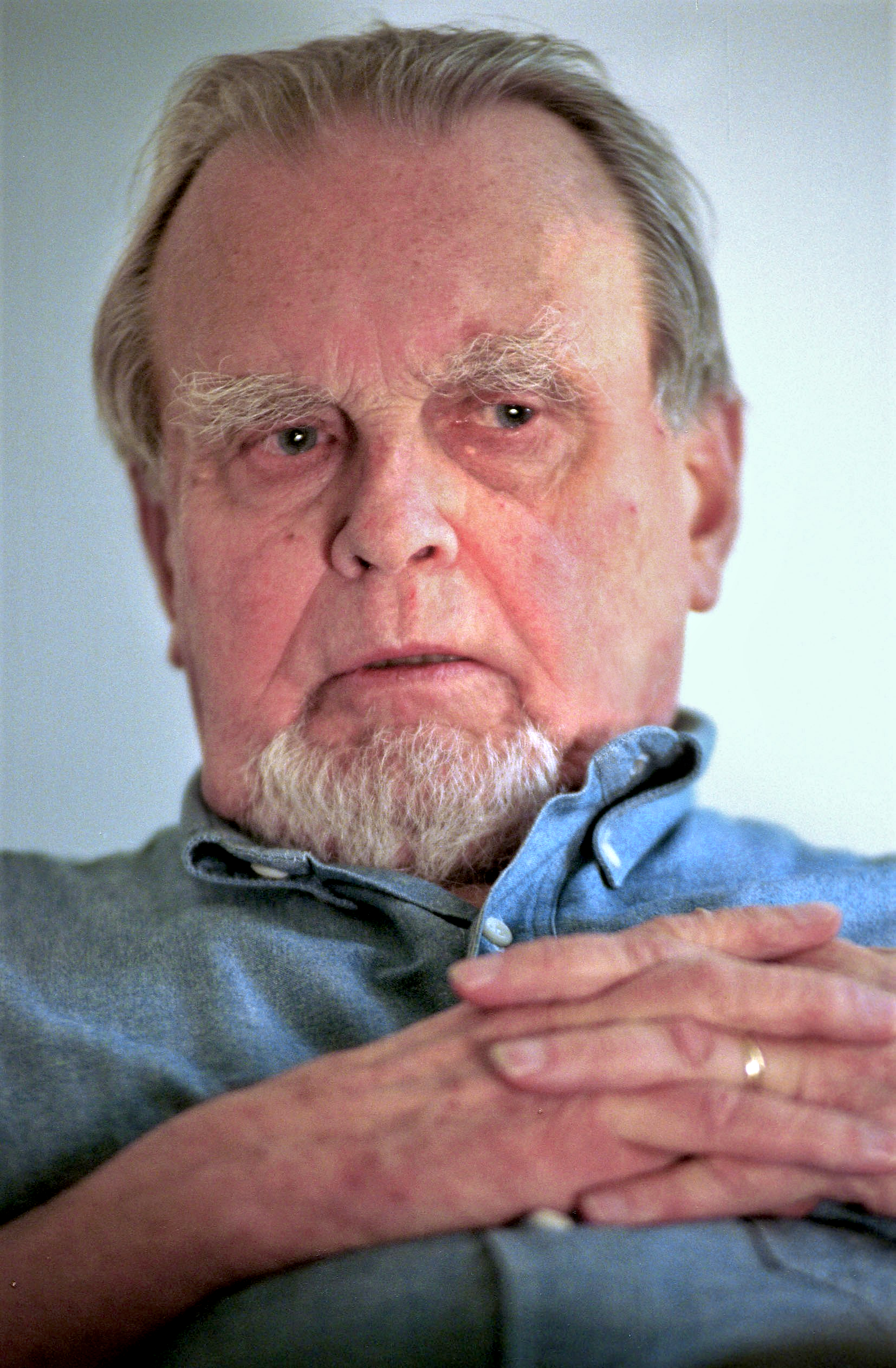
Czesław
Miłosz
(1911–2004)

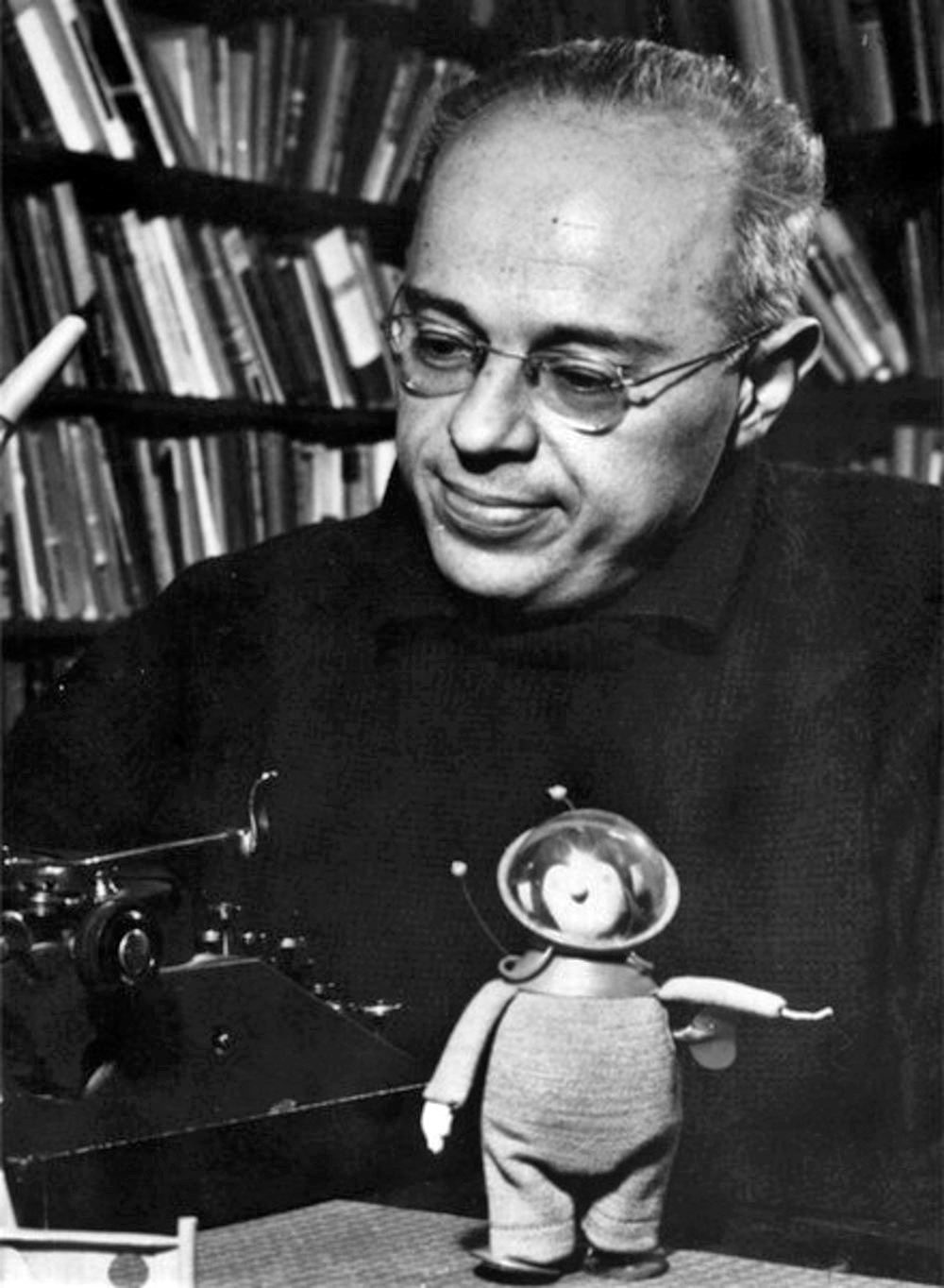
Stanisław
Lem
(1921–2006)

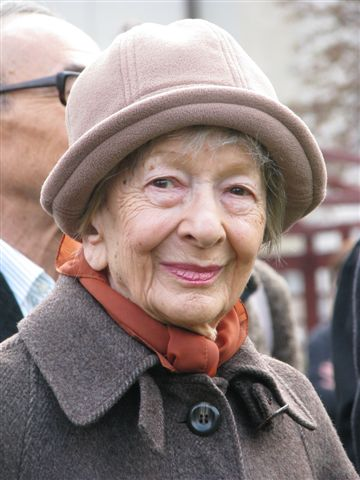
Wisława
Szymborska
(1923–2012)

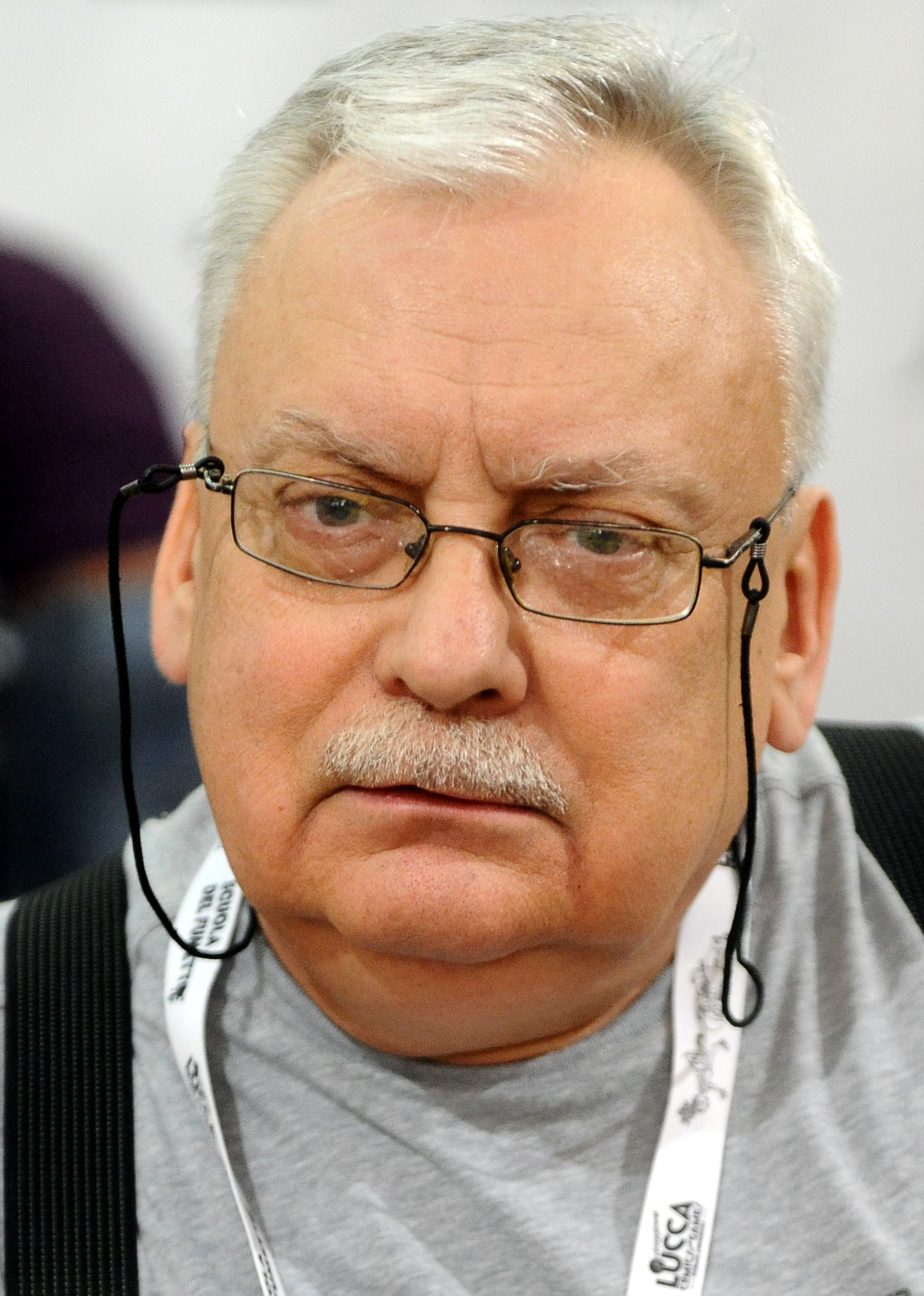
Andrzej
Sapkowski
(born 1948)

== Sample text ==
Polish pronunciation

Article 1 of the Universal Declaration of Human Rights in Polish:

Wszyscy ludzie rodzą się wolni i równi pod względem swej godności i swych praw. Są oni obdarzeni rozumem i sumieniem i powinni postępować wobec innych w duchu braterstwa.

Article 1 of the Universal Declaration of Human Rights in English:

All human beings are born free and equal in dignity and rights. They are endowed with reason and conscience and should act towards one another in a spirit of brotherhood.

== See also ==
- Polonism (words of Polish origin)
- Adam Mickiewicz Institute
- Holy Cross Sermons
- Lechitic languages
- University of Łódź School of Polish for Foreigners
- West Slavic languages

== Sources ==
- Gussmann, Edmund (2007). The Phonology of Polish. Oxford: Oxford University Press. ISBN 978-0-19-926747-7. OCLC 320907619.
- Rubach, Jerzy; Booij, Geert E. (1985), "A grid theory of stress in Polish", Lingua, 66 (4): 281–319, doi:10.1016/0024-3841(85)90032-4, hdl:1887/11158, S2CID 170536799
