= Permanent exhibition in Krasiński Palace =

Polish exhibition

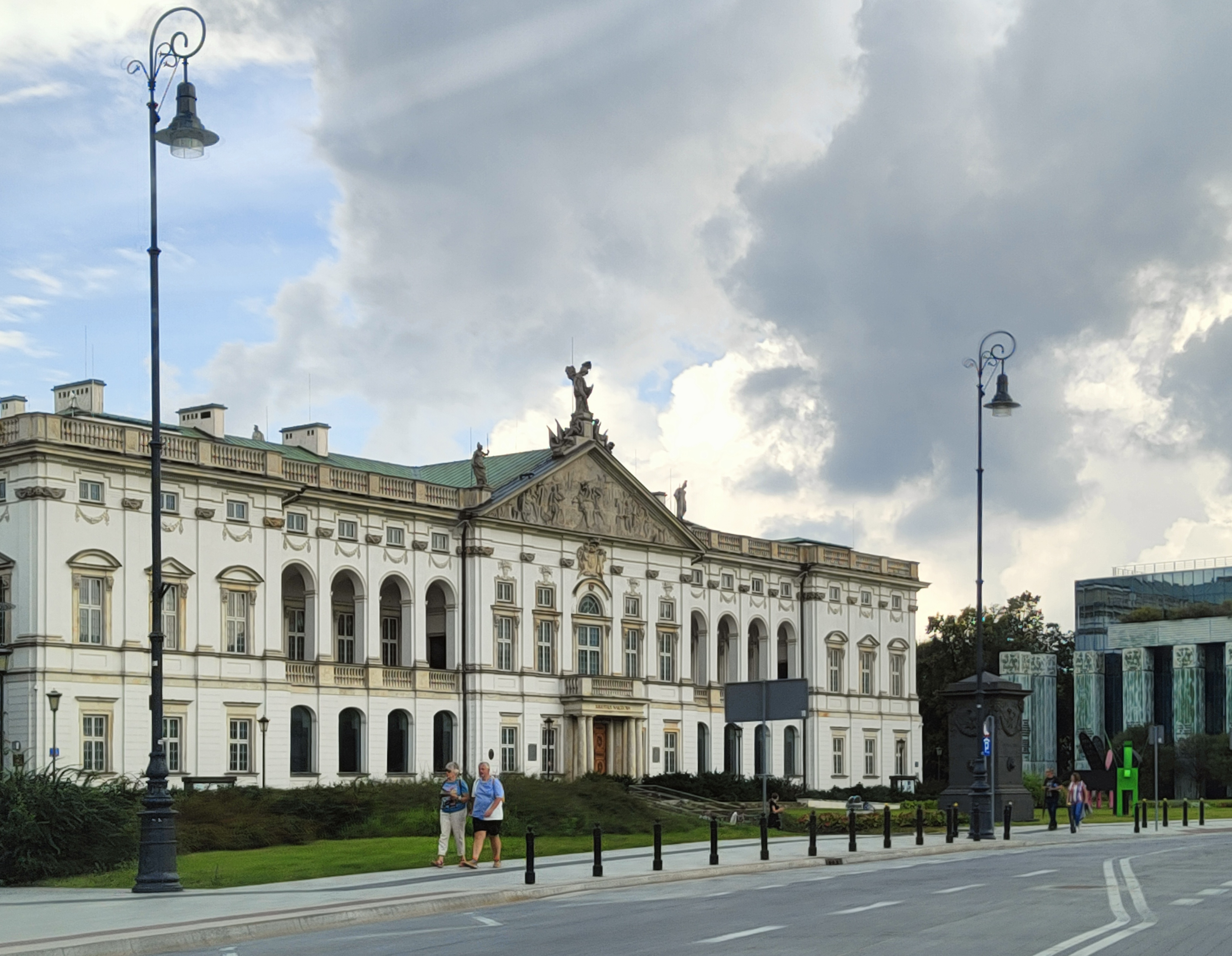
Palace of the Commonwealth on Warsaw's Krasiński Square

Permanent exhibition in Krasiński Palace is an exhibition of the most valuable objects from the collection of the National Library of Poland in the baroque interiors of the Krasiński Palace (Palace of the Commonwealth) in Warsaw.

== Background ==
The exhibition features objects from Polish and global written heritage such as the Holy Cross Sermons, the Sankt Florian Psalter, the Old Annals of the Holy Cross, Polish Chronicle of Gallus Anonymus, Chronicle of Wincenty Kadłubek and medieval and Renaissance works by European illuminators. Literary manuscripts are displayed in a special section of exhibition. They include manuscripts by Jan Kochanowski, Juliusz Słowacki, Adam Mickiewicz, Cyprian Kamil Norwid, Zbigniew Herbert and Czesław Miłosz. Items relating to musical culture are also on display, such as handwritten scores or original copies of works by Frédéric Chopin, Henryk Górecki, Agnieszka Osiecka and Jacek Kaczmarski.

The exhibition was opened on 22 May 2024. Admission is free of charge. The exhibition is open 6 days a week (except Tuesdays).

== Objects ==
Image	Name	Author	Date	Description
	Old Annals of the Holy Cross		first half of 12th century	The oldest Polish written history, recording key events from the very beginnings of the Polish state. It contains informations from an earlier yearbook that has not survived.
	Polish Chronicle of Gallus Anonymus		second half of 14th century	The oldest Polish chronicle, describing events from the reign of the country's first rulers. The chronicle was written at the beginning of 12th century, but this oldest surviving manuscript was produced in the second half of the 14th century.
	Polish Chronicle	Wincenty Kadłubek	1430–1440	A copy from 15th century of first chronicle of Polish history written by a Pole, Wincenty Kadłubek, Bishop of Kraków, dates from the late 12th, early 13th century.
	Annals	Jan Długosz	1573–1576	The most comprehensive and reliable account of Polish history produced in the Middle Ages by Jan Długosz in the 15th century. This carefully produced copy of Długosz's work dates from 1573 to 1576.
	Tyniec Sacramentarium		circa 1060–1070	A luxurious liturgical manuscript kept in Poland for almost 1,000 years. The richly decorated parchment manuscript is partly written in gold and silver on purple-stained pages and contains 13 decorated initials and two fullpage miniatures.
	Codex Suprasliensis		late 10th century	Inscribed on UNESCO'S Memory of the World Register, the Codex Suprasliensis is one of the oldest records of writing in Cyrillic and of the Old Church Slavonic language.
	Sankt Florian Psalter		late 14th century / early 15th century	The oldest fully preserved work in the Polish language. It contains Psalms from the Bible translated into three languages: Polish, Latin and German.
	Duchess Anastasia′s Gospel Book		12th century	This parchment manuscript still has its original, richly decorated binding made of oak covered with silver. Inside the binding is manuscript from around 1160, the origins of which are connected with Duchess Anastasia, or Viacheslava of Novgorod.
	Holy Cross Sermons		first half of 14th century	The oldest surviving prose text in literary Polish, comprising six sermons recorded in the first half of the 14th century. The text of the sermons, written bilingually in Polish and Latin, testifies to the high level of development of the Polish language and its literary maturity.
	Bogurodzica		1456	Bogurodzica is considered the original Polish national anthem. The first two stanzas are believed to date from around the mid-13th century. This is the third oldest manuscript version of the song.
	Seven Deadly Sins		15th century	One of the many historically important 15th century works in Polish. The manuscript contains, among other things, the seven deadly sins listed.
	Psalter of Jesus	Ladislas of Gielniów	late 15th century / early 15th century	Psalter of Jesus is one of the oldest and most popular Polish songs about the Passion of Christ. The song was intended to be sung, read or spoken as a personal prayer.
	Przemyśl Meditation		late 15th century, early 16th century	A collection of apocryphal texts in Polish from the 15th century describing the lives of Jesus, Mary and Joseph. The Przemyśl Meditation is one most important early texts in the Polish language. The manuscript was produced sometime after 1512.
	The Life of the Lord Jesus Christ	Baltazar Opec	1522	The oldest entirely preserved printed book in Polish. This treatise by Baltazar Opec is a reworking of a composition traditionally attributed to St Bonaventure, Meditationes vitae Christi. It is one of the few copies that have survived to this day.
	Love letter of 1444		1444	This love letter is a remarkable example of medieval personal correspondence in Polish. After being transcribed it was crossed out as not belonging to the rest of the manuscript.
	Antiquities of the Jews	Flavius Josephus	1466	A manuscript written and illuminated in Kraków. The manuscript contains twelve of the series of twenty books by the Jewish historian Flavius Josephus. This is a rare case of a medieval book made entirely in Poland that has survived unchanged to the present day.
	Gradual of Abbot Mścisław		circa 1390	A medieval illuminated liturgical book from the Benedictine Abbey of Tyniec. The parchment manuscript contains the Latin text of liturgical songs along with their musical notation, richly decorated by illuminators from Lesser Poland.
	Antiphonary of Abbot Mścisław		circa 1395–1400	A Latin manuscript written and illuminated in the monastery scriptorium at Tyniec, which contains antiphons. The manuscript is decorated with ten illuminated initials.
	Skawinka′s Gradual		circa 1450	This richly illuminated gradual was produced at the Benedictine Abbey of Tyniec. It contains the words and music that make up the chants for mass for the entire liturgical year.
	Gradual of the Kraków Augustinians		1528	A Latin manuscript written and richly illuminated at the Augustinian Eremite monastery in Kazimierz near Kraków. It contains the words and music of the liturgical chants, as well as figural initials and numerous pen-flourished initials.
	Miniature book of hours		circa 1500	A thumb-sized miniature prayer book for lay people. This book of hours contains daily prayers asking for the intercession of the Blessed Virgin Mary. Despite its tiny format, the creator included the full-page miniatures.
	Statutes of Casimir the Great		early 16th century	A collection of laws issued by Casimir III the Great, the reformer king and most eminent lawmaker of medieval Poland. This manuscript is the early 16th century Polish translation of the Statutes.
	Statuta Regni Poloniae		1478	The first printed edition of Polish land laws known as Syntagmata. Its creation testifies to the demand for legal texts, which could no longer be satisfied by manuscripts alone. This copy belonged to Tadeusz Czacki.
	Łaski's Statute		early 16th century	The first modern collection of Polish laws. The collection was an official work, approved by the King during a meeting of the Sejm. A number of copies of this edition were printed on parchment and the engraving coloured. This copy belonged to Jan Tarnowski.
	Theatre of the Virtues of the Venerable Stanislaus Hosius	Tomasz Treter	circa 1595–1600	A collection of 105 drawings by the eminent engraver Tomasz Treter, depicting the life of Stanislaus Hosius, one of the most important figures of the European Counter-Reformation.
	First Statute of Lithuania		16th century	The first of the three 16th-century codifications of the law of the Grand Duchy of Lithuania. The work is written in Western Ruthenian, the official language of the Grand Duchy. The showcased fair copy belonged to Albertas Goštautas.
	Second Statute of Lithuania		1566–1568	The second in the series of three 16th-century codifications of the law of the Grand Duchy of Lithuania. This manuscript copy contains a translation from Western Ruthenian into Polish.
	Kormchaia Book from Dzików		15th century	A collection of rules of the Orthodox Church from the 15th century, providing a unique example of the activity of canonists in the lands that once belonged to the Grand Duchy of Lithuania.
	New Testament from the 8th century		8th century	One of the oldest manuscripts in any Polish collection. This 8th century New Testament in Latin probably comes from somewhere on the border between present-day Germany and France.
	The oldest Anglo-Saxon lectionary		early 11th century	This manuscript, containing Gospel readings, was written around the year 1000. The tome contains three full-page miniatures with images of the Evangelists. The manuscript was probably purchased for the first Polish National Library, founded in 1747 in Warsaw.
	Skevra Evangeliary		late 12th century	One of the world's most valuable Armenian manuscripts, also known as the Lemberg Gospel. This is an outstanding example of the illuminator's art from Lesser Armenia, or the Armenian Kingdom of Cilicia.
	Revelations	Bridget of Sweden	1375–1377	This manuscript, produced in Italy, is one of the oldest surviving copies of the original version of the Revelations by Bridget of Sweden. The illuminations are attributed to a Neapolitan artist known as “Maestro del Seneca dei Girolamini”.
	Potocki Psalter		13th century	An example of a French illuminated manuscript from the 13th century, containing collection of psalms in Latin. The illuminations of manuscript were so valuable that some of them were later cut out and are now in foreign museums.
	Calendarium Parisiense		third quarter of 14th century	An example of medieval illumination produced in the 14th century, probably in Paris. It contains a liturgical calendar with the days dedicated to specific saints clearly indicated.
	Roman de la Rose	Guillaume de Lorris	circa 1385–1395	One of the most popular texts about love, copied many times during the Middle Ages. This copy dates to the late 14th century and was illuminated in Paris. It contains 40 miniatures.
	Golden Legend	Jacobus de Voragine	circa 1480–1490	The most popular collection of saints' lives in the Middle Ages. The manuscript was mainly illuminated by two miniaturists active in Padua and Venice. The incomplete decoration of the book consists of 84 miniatures.
	The oldest printed work in Cyrillic		before 1491	The earliest surviving example of a work in Old Church Slavonic printed in Cyrillic script, published in Kraków by Schweipolt Fiol.
	Jan Zamoyski's Prayer Book		circa 1485	The only copy in the world of the first printed edition of the French book of hours, published in the printshop of Jean du Pré in Paris. It is decorated with full-page coloured woodcuts.
	La Sforziada	Giovanni Simonetta	1490	One of the most famous books printed in Renaissance Italy. Four luxurious copies of the book were printed in Florence, for four different members of the Sforza family. This is most valuable copy containing the artist's signature.
	Catalogue of the Archbishops of Gniezno	Jan Długosz	1530–1535	This manuscript, decorated in Kraków by Stanisław Samostrzelnik, was created for the Bishop Piotr Tomicki. It contains biographies of successive archbishops of Gniezno written by Jan Długosz.
	Bishop Tomicki's Missal		1532	Published in Venice, this missal for the diocese of Kraków was compiled at the request of Bishop Piotr Tomicki. It has a Renaissance binding featuring the Bishop's coat of arms.
	Ciołek's Missal		circa 1515	A liturgical book created during the heyday of the Kraków school of illumination. It was commissioned by Erazm Ciołek. Stanisław Samostrzelnik probably contributed to the decoration of the manuscript.
	Liber chamorum	Walerian Nekanda Trepka	circa 1626	Liber chamorum is a 17th-century catalogue of individuals and families. Its author tracked down individuals and families whose membership of this class was, in his opinion, illegitimate. This autograph copy contains the author's own corrections.
	De revolutionibus orbium coelestium	Nicolaus Copernicus	1543	A first edition of Nicolaus Copernicus's De revolutionibus orbium coelestium. Surviving copies of this edition are a great rarity. The National Library's of Poland copy was donated in 1982 by Colonel Roman Umiastowski.
	A Short Conversation... (Polish: Krótka rozprawa...)	Mikołaj Rej	1543	The only surviving copy of the first edition of the well-known work A Short Conversation Between Three Persons, a Squire, a Bailiff, and a Parson by Mikołaj Rej, one of the masters of the Polish Renaissance.
	First printed work from the printing house of Isaac Ben Aaron Prostitz	Naftali Hirc ben Menachem	1569	An important early example of Jewish printing in Kraków. The copy is the earliest book printed by Isaac ben Aaron Prostitz. It contains a commentary by Naftali Hirc ben Menachem of Lviv on the Midrash on the Five Megillot.
	Memoirs (Polish: Pamiętniki)	Jan Chryzostom Pasek	first half of 18th century	Memoirs of Jan Chryzostom Pasek is a colourful description of life in Poland in the turbulent, war-filled 17th century. This manuscript is the only surviving early copy of the work, dating from the first half of the 18th century.
	The Dismissal of the Greek Envoys (Polish: Odprawa posłów greckich)	Jan Kochanowski	1578	The first printed edition of the earliest Polish Renaissance tragedy by Jan Kochanowski. It was printed in the so-called “flying printing house”, which moved around with the monarch's court.
	Only copy of a work by Jan Kochanowski in the author′s hand	Jan Kochanowski	1578	A fair copy of the poem Dryas Zamchana by Jan Kochanowski. The manuscript formed the basis for the first printed edition of the work.
	Song of St John′s Eve (Polish: Pieśń świętojańska o sobótce)	Jan Kochanowski	1570s–1580s	A manuscript version of Song of St John's Eve by Jan Kochanowski in a slightly earlier version of the work than the first printed edition of 1586. This copy forms part of a collection of poems by various late Renaissance authors.
	Book binding from the Silver Library of Duke Albrecht of Prussia		after 1555	A masterpiece of Renaissance goldsmithing. The Silver Library was the collection of prints for which Duke Albrecht Hohenzollern of Prussia had artistic cover decorations made of precious metals. This binding was made by the Basel-based goldsmith Paul Hoffmann.
	Geography	Claudius Ptolemy	before 1467	Renaissance maps based on the treatise on geography by Claudius Ptolemy. Jan Zamoyski received the work as a gift from Pope Gregory XIII.
	Portolan of Angelo Freducci	Angelo Freducci	1554	The first of two known nautical atlases by Angelo Freducci, a 16th-century cartographer from Ancona. This is an example of an accordion-folded portolan, or collection of charts for sailors.
	Portolan of Antonio Millo	Antonio Millo	1583	A hand-drawn atlas, consisting of eight ornately executed portolans on parchment, one of the few objects of this type so well preserved in a Polish collection.
	Flora Sinensis	Michał Boym	1656	One of the first European albums on the natural history of East Asia. This is the best-known work by Michał Boym, a Polish Jesuit and pioneer of sinology.
	Historiae naturalis	Jan Jonston	circa 1652	The first Polish zoology textbook written by John Jonston. He aimed to provide basic information about all the animal species known at the time, including fantastic ones.
	Album of Turkish costumes		18th century	A collection of 90 miniatures depicting characteristically dressed figures – dignitaries and functionaries of the Sultan's court from the reign of Ibrahim I.
	The Garden of Knowledge	Inayatullah Kambu	1784	A lavishly illuminated collection of stories in the Persian language about the love between the Mughal Prince Jahandar and Queen Bahrewar Banu. Its author was Inayatullah Kambu.
	The Manuscript Found in Saragossa	Jan Potocki	late 18th century / early 19th century	Manuscript excerpt covering Days 41–51 of the famous frame-tale novel by Jan Potocki, written in French.
	Concerning the Horses of the Orient	Wacław Seweryn Rzewuski	early 19th century	A description of the Arabian Peninsula by Wacław Seweryn Rzewuski. Manuscript was published in 2017 in its entirety by the National Library of Poland.
	Constitution of 3 May 1791		1791	The first modern constitution in Europe and the second in the world after the Constitution of the United States of America. This copy belonged to Paweł Ksawery Brzostowski.
	Can Poles Win Their Independence? (Polish: Czy Polacy wybić się mogą na niepodległość?)	Józef Pawlikowski	1800	A pamphlet from 1800 published anonymously by General Tadeusz Kościuszko's secretary, who may also have had a significant influence on its content. This copy is the only surviving one of the first edition and inscribed on UNESCO'S Memory of the World Register.
	A Constitution for Europe	Wojciech Jastrzębowski	1831	A project for an alliance between nations to end war in Europe by Wojciech Jastrzębowski. He drew up a set of lasting and just norms on which he believed peace should be based.
	A lock of General Tadeusz Kościuszko′s hair			This lock of Kościuszko's hair was cut off after his death and placed in a special pouch. It is a testimony to the cult that arose around Kościuszko during the Partitions of Poland.
	Plume from Prince Józef Poniatowski′s shako			The plume from the ornate shako, or high military cap, belonging to Prince Józef Poniatowski. The shako itself has since been lost and only the plume remains.
	Piano Concerto No. 2	Frédéric Chopin	circa 1835	The earlier of the two piano concertos written by Frédéric Chopin. The piano part of this manuscript is in Chopin's own hand.
	Preludes	Frédéric Chopin	1838–1839	A series of small, free-form pieces for piano by Frédéric Chopin. This autograph copy of the preludes is a fair copy ready for publication.
	Letter to Józef Elsner	Frédéric Chopin	1831	An account of the Chopin's stay in Vienna – the letter sent to the composer Józef Elsner, his former teacher.
	Visiting card of Fryderyk Chopin		circa 1836	A memento of Chopin's life in Paris – the visiting card dates from around 1836. In addition to the composer's name, it gives one of his addresses in Paris.
	Ode to Youth (Polish: Oda do młodości)	Adam Mickiewicz	1820	A copy in the author's own hand of a poem Ode to Youth considered a manifesto for the first generation of Polish Romantics. This manuscript contains the earliest version of the poem, created in Kaunas.
	Ballads and Romances (Polish: Ballady i romanse)	Adam Mickiewicz	1822	The book by Adam Mickiewicz which marked the birth of Romanticism in Poland. The copy belonged to Prot Lelewel, brother of Joachim Lelewel.
	Balladyna	Juliusz Słowacki	1834	A fair copy of one of the most popular Polish Romantic dramas. In 2021 this manuscript was inscribed on UNESCO'S Memory of the World Register.
	Vade-mecum	Cyprian Kamil Norwid	1865	An autograph copy of the most important collection of poetry by Cyprian Kamil Norwid. His Vade-mecum of 1865 did not see print during his lifetime, although the poet had prepared it for publication.
	Orbis I, Orbis II	Cyprian Kamil Norwid	1845–1870	Two albums documenting Norwid's extra-literary activities. In the collections entitled Orbis, the poet brought together copies and original works in various media, in addition to hand written notes, magazine cuttings and photographs.
	An Ancient Tale (Polish: Stara baśń)	Józef Ignacy Kraszewski	1876	Manuscript of the first version of An Ancient Tale by Józef Ignacy Kraszewski. It is his best-known work about the pre-Christian history of Poland.
	Quo vadis	Henryk Sienkiewicz	1894–1896	A copy in the author's own hand of the most widely translated work of literature in Polish. The international success of the novel contributed to Sienkiewicz being awarded the Nobel Prize in 1905.
	The Knights of the Cross (Polish: Krzyżacy)	Henryk Sienkiewicz	1896–1899	An autograph copy of one of the most popular Polish novels set against the background of the Polish-Teutonic conflict. This copy of the manuscript was used as the basis for the first edition by the Warsaw publishing house Gebethner and Wolff.
	On the Niemen (Polish: Nad Niemnem)	Eliza Orzeszkowa	1886–1887	An autograph copy of one of the most important Polish realist novels On the Niemen by Eliza Orzeszkowa. The corrections were made by the author.
	Pharaoh (Polish: Faraon)	Bolesław Prus	1894–1895	A manuscript copy of a historical novel set in ancient Egypt by Bolesław Prus, a master of realist prose, written in the author's own hand.
	The Faithful River (Polish: Wierna rzeka)	Stefan Żeromski	1912	An autograph copy of the historical novel The Faithful River by Stefan Żeromski, set during the January Uprising. The fair copy of the novel in the author's own hand is written very neatly with few corrections.
	Ashes (Polish: Popioły)	Stefan Żeromski	circa 1898–1900	An autograph copy of Żeromski's novel Ashes about national liberation struggles in the Napoleonic era. The text is written in notebooks bound together with oilcloth covers, glued together by heat.
	About the Dwarfs and Little Orphan Mary (Polish: O krasnoludkach i o sierotce Marysi )	Maria Konopnicka	1896	A first edition of one of Poland's bestknown children's books About the Dwarfs and Little Orphan Mary.
	The Oath (Polish: Rota)	Maria Konopnicka	before 1916	The Oath is a Maria Konopnicka's poem written in 1908 in reaction to the persecution of Poles in Greater Poland and very quickly became a popular patriotic song and protest against Germanisation. The poem was set to music by Feliks Nowowiejski.
	The music for The Oath	Feliks Nowowiejski	circa 1910	Feliks Nowowiejski set Maria Konopnicka's poem The Oath to music in 1910. This autograph score of the composition was prepared for publication in 1910. It is scored for voice and piano.
	Letter from Maria Skłodowska-Curie	Maria Skłodowska-Curie	1921	A reply from the eminent Polish scientist, Maria Skłodowska-Curie to a letter from Jan Moszyński, President of the Polish Committee in New York.
	Letter of condolence from the Polish Jewish community in Strasbourg on the death of Józef Piłsudski		1935	A letter of condolence after Piłsudski's death in 1936, written in Polish, from the Polish Jewish community in Strasbourg addressed to the Consul General of the Republic of Poland.
	Second Autumn (Polish: Druga jesień)	Bruno Schulz	1934	The only surviving literary manuscript by Bruno Schulz. The short story Second Autumn was first published in the literary magazine ″Kamena″ in 1933. The autograph is a fair copy with just a few corrections.
	Diary (Polish: Dzienniki)	Zofia Nałkowska	1899–1954	A diary of the writer Zofia Nałkowska. The manuscript consists of 58 notebooks. It is source of information not only about the life of the writer but also about the historical events occurring between 1899 and 1954.
	In Purest Sorrow (Polish: W żalu najczystszym)	Krzysztof Kamil Baczyński	1942	A handmade collection of poems by Krzysztof Kamil Baczyński. Decorated initials and watercolour vignettes was also painted by the poet. In 2021 the volume was inscribed on UNESCO'S Memory of the World Register.
	Elegy on the Polish Boy (Polish: Elegia o chłopcu polskim)	Krzysztof Kamil Baczyński	1944	A manuscript of poem Elegy on..., one of the most famous works by Krzysztof Kamil Baczyński. The fair copy of the poem was prepared by the poet's own hand.
	Conversations with an Executioner (Polish: Rozmowy z katem)	Kazimierz Moczarski		A manuscript of Conversations with an Executioner by Kazimierz Moczarski. It is Moczarski's account of his time spent in a cell Jürgen Stroop, a high-ranking SS Officer responsible for the persecution of Polish citizens, especially Polish Jews.
	Rosemary′s Baby	Krzysztof Komeda	1967–1968	A handwritten score for Roman Polański's horror film Rosemary's Baby by composer Krzysztof Komeda. As a jazz musician, Komeda based his compositions on improvisation, which is reflected in the relaxed way in which the material was recorded.
	Małgośka	Agnieszka Osiecka	before 1970	Małgośka is one of the biggest Polish pop hits. Music is by Katarzyna Gärtner, lyrics by Agnieszka Osiecka. It was made famous by Maryla Rodowicz. The handwritten text comes from the materials for Osiecka's show Appetite for Cherries.
	Walls (Polish: Mury)	Jacek Kaczmarski	1978	A typescript of song Walls by Jacek Kaczmarski. It was the unofficial anthem of the Polish trade union Solidarity and a musical symbol of the Polish struggle against Communism.
	The Watchmaker of Light (Polish: Zegarmistrz światła)	Tadeusz Woźniak	circa 1972	A fair copy of a song The Watchmaker of Light by Tadeusz Woźniak. The song is one of the best-known Polish popular songs of the 20th century.
	Symphony of Sorrowful Songs	Henryk Mikołaj Górecki	circa 1976–1977	The best-known work by Henryk Mikołaj Górecki, one of the most outstanding Polish composers. This is a very careful handwritten copy of the score, written by the composer himself.
	Kronos	Witold Gombrowicz	1953–1969	A manuscript of the intimate diary of the writer Witold Gombrowicz, containing personal notes from the years 1953–1969. Unlike Gombrowicz's Dzienniki (Diaries), which were intended for publication, Kronos is a record of his everyday life.
	Nobel Prize notebook of Czesław Miłosz	Czesław Miłosz		When the poet Czesław Miłosz received the news that he had been awarded the Nobel Prize in Literature he made a telling entry in his notebook: “Here followed the Nobel Prize and a long pause in my activities”.
	Czesław Miłosz′s Nobel Prize medal			Czesław Miłosz was presented with the Nobel Prize by King Carl XVI Gustaf at a gala ceremony held on 10 December 1980 in Stockholm. The Nobel Prize medal has a diameter of 659 mm, weighs 113 grams and is made of 18-carat gold.
	Rays of Dazzling Light (Polish: Jasności promieniste)	Czesław Miłosz		Poem Rays of Dazzling Light is one of the most important works from Miłosz's late period. It is a fair copy of the poem with one minor correction.
	The Message of Mr Cogito (Polish: Przesłanie Pana Cogito)	Zbigniew Herbert	circa 1960–1973	A manuscript of poem The Message of Mr Cogito by Zbigniew Herbert, one of the most important works of 20th-century Polish literature.
	Nike Who Hesitates (Polish: Nike, która się waha)	Zbigniew Herbert	before 1956	Nike Who Hesitates is an early work by Zbigniew Herbert featuring the mythological motifs characteristic of his work. The draft version of the poem with Herbert's corrections allows one to trace part of his creative process.
	Elegy of Fortinbras (Polish: Tren Fortynbrasa)	Zbigniew Herbert	before 1961	A fair copy of Elegy of Fortinbras, a poem from Herbert's third volume of poetry. The poem has been translated many number of times and been the subject of literary criticism.

== Bibliography ==
- Makowski, Tomasz; Sapała, Patryk, eds. (2024). The Palace of the Commonwealth. Three times opened. Treasures from the National Library of Poland at the Palace of the Commonwealth. Warsaw: National Library of Poland.
