= Fiol =

Fiol is a surname. Notable people with the surname include:

- Henry Fiol, American singer, songwriter, bandleader and painter
- Liana Fiol Matta, Puerto Rican jurist
- Mauricio Fiol, Peruvian swimmer
- Schweipolt Fiol, German printer
  - Fiol's Octoechos, the first printed book in the Cyrillic script
  - Flowery Triodion (Fiol)
- Shae Fiol, Cuban-American singer-songwriter
- Suzanne Fiol, American photographer and impresario
- Viviana Fiol, Puerto Rican footballer

== See also ==
- Fiol Prosecco, an Italian luxury brand of wine
