= Jan Zamoyski's Prayer Book =

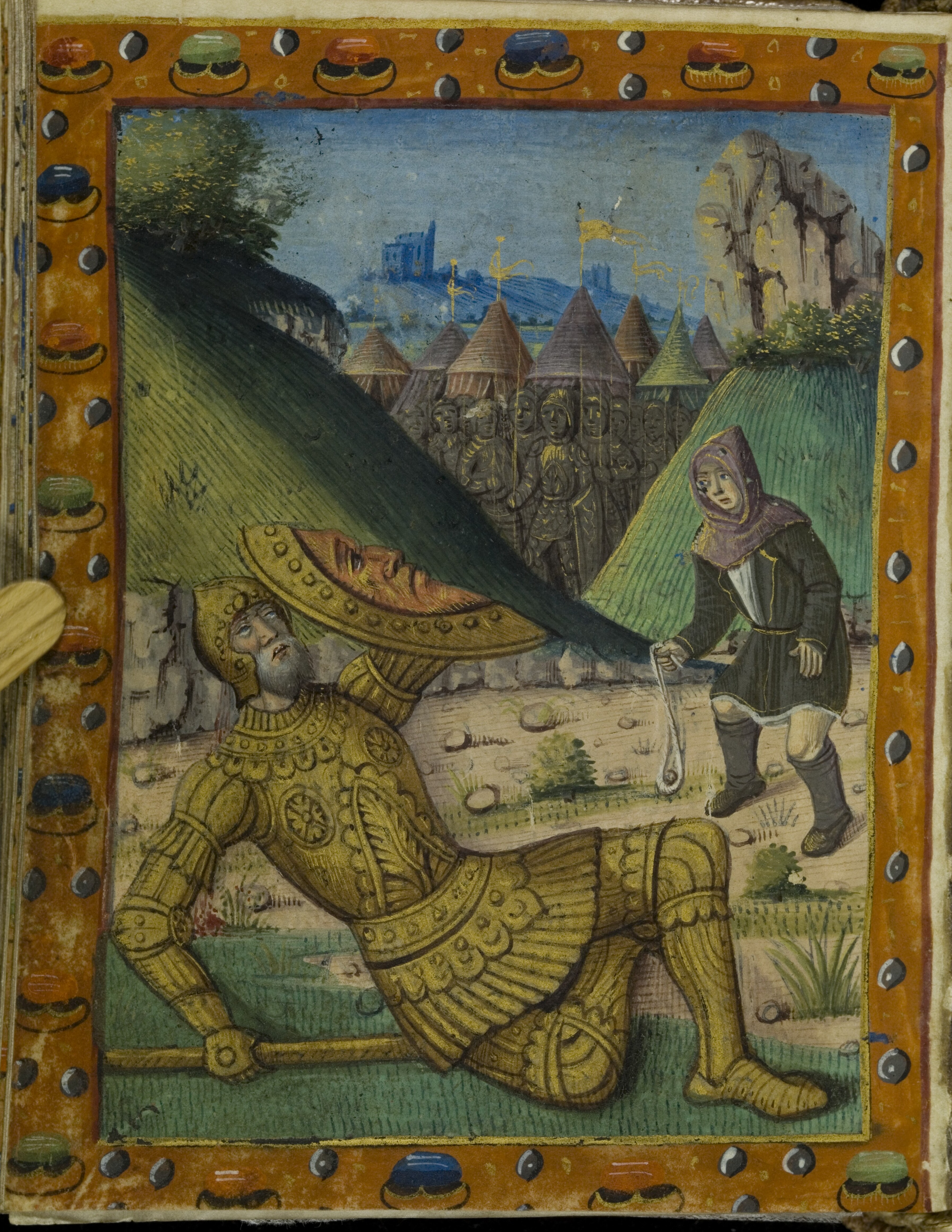
- Original title: Horae Beatae Mariae Virginis ad usum Turonensem, Lat. et Gall.
- Language: Latin, French
- Genre: Book of hours
- Publisher: Jean du Pré
- Publication date: around 1485
- Publication place: France

Jan Zamoyski's Prayer Book is a French printed book of hours from around 1485. It contains 14 full-page "miniatures" that are woodcuts that have been painted over. The book is an early and sumptuous example of a transitional form between an illuminated manuscript and a printed book with black and white illustrations.

Jan Zamoyski's Prayer Book is the only copy in the world of the first printed edition of the French book of hours. The book was published around 1485 probably in the printshop of Jean du Pré in Paris. Between the sixteenth and the twentieth century, the copy was held by the library of the Zamoyski family. It is traditionally identified as the prayer book of Jan Zamoyski. After the World War II, Jan Tomasz Zamoyski deposited the family library with the National Library of Poland, to which it now belongs. From May 2024, the book is presented at a permanent exhibition in the Palace of the Commonwealth.

The prayer book contains hours destined for the diocese of Tours. It is printed in Gothic type on parchment. A text is written in Latin and French. The size of the book is 10.5x8 cm. The 14 full-page figurative images preceding selected texts of the Gospels, the Hours, penitential psalms and prayers for the dead, were painted on woodcuts. Other decorative elements are painted over blank spaces left in the text for this. These include three small Evangelist portraits at the start of their gospels., painted borders imitating treasure bindings with jewels, and many small initials with floral and zoomorphic motifs and plant borders on the margins of some pages.

== Bibliography ==
- Makowski, Tomasz; Sapała, Patryk, eds. (2024). The Palace of the Commonwealth. Three times opened. Treasures from the National Library of Poland at the Palace of the Commonwealth. Warsaw: National Library of Poland.
- Tchórzewska-Kabata, Halina; Dąbrowski, Maciej, eds. (2003). More precious than gold. Treasures of the Polish National Library (electronic version) (PDF). Translated by Dorosz, Janina. Warsaw: National Library of Poland. ISBN 83-7009-402-3.
