= Concerning the Horses of the Orient =

2007 book by Wacław Seweryn Rzewuski

Concerning the Horses of the Orient and Those Originating from Oriental Breeds
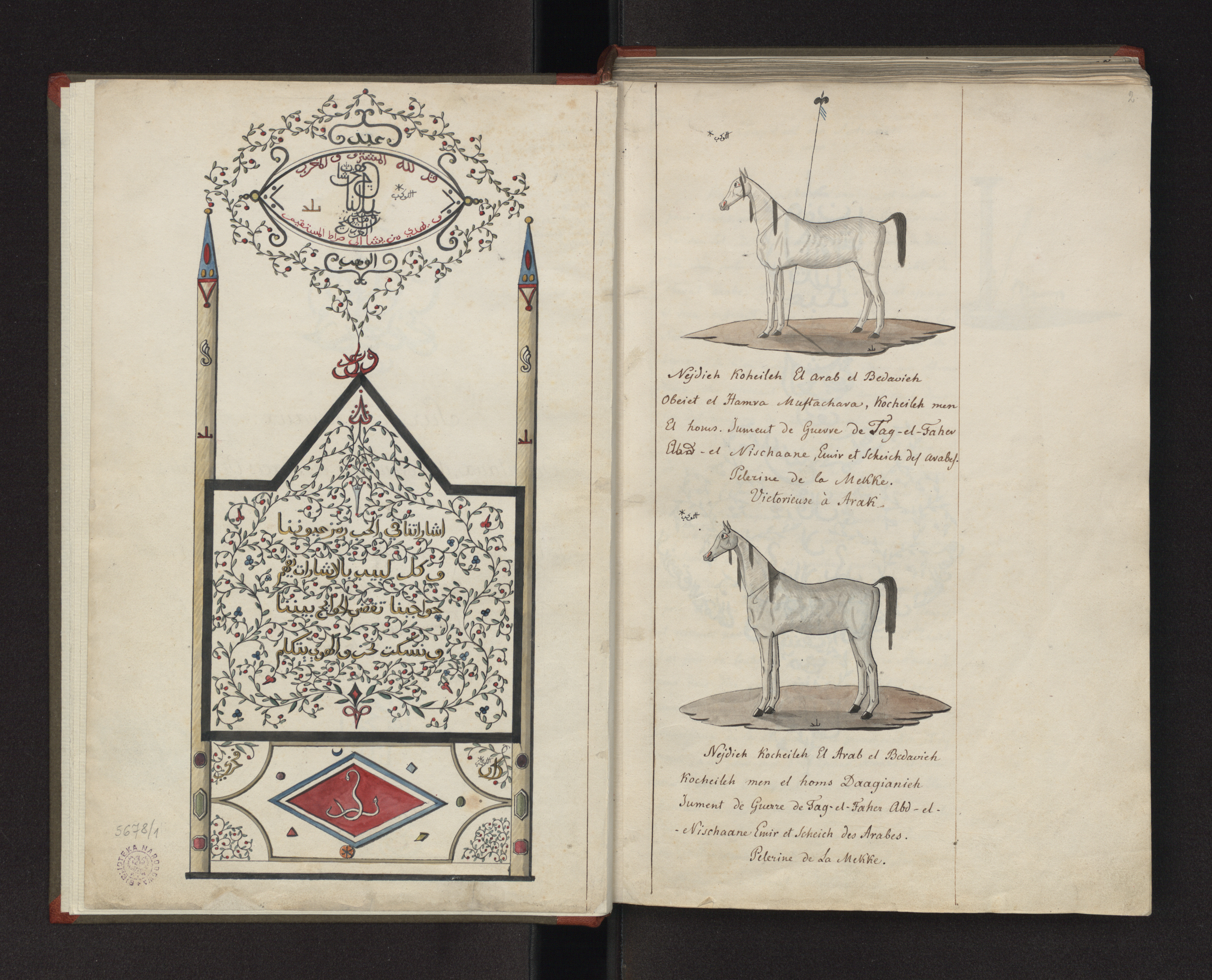
- Author: Wacław Seweryn Rzewuski
- Original title: Sur les chevaux orientaux et provenants des races orientales
- Language: French
- Publisher: National Library of Poland
- Publication date: 2007

Concerning the Horses of the Orient and Those Originating from Oriental Breeds (French: Sur les chevaux orientaux et provenants des races orientales) is a book by Wacław Seweryn Rzewuski describing the Arabian Peninsula.

Wacław Seweryn Rzewuski was an enthusiast of the Orient and he was also a breeder of pure-bred Arabian horses. Between 1817 and 1819 he travelled among others to Cilicia, Palestine and Najd in the central part of the Arabian Peninsula. Rzewuski compiled information into a three-volume work in French, which is not solely devoted to thoroughbred horses. The work is a valuable source of knowledge about the culture of peoples such as the nomadic Bedouins. The text is accompanied by many illustrations by the author.

In the 1920s, Adam Rzewuski sold the manuscript of the work to the National Library of Poland. From May 2024, the manuscript is presented at a permanent exhibition in the Palace of the Commonwealth. Fragments of the work were published earlier, but only in 2017 was it published in its entirety by the National Library, with English and Polish translations of the text. This five-volume scientific edition was prepared on behalf of Qatar Museums.

== Bibliography ==
- Makowski, Tomasz; Sapała, Patryk, eds. (2024). The Palace of the Commonwealth. Three times opened. Treasures from the National Library of Poland at the Palace of the Commonwealth. Warsaw: National Library of Poland.
