= Revelationes (Rps 3310 II) =

14th-century manuscript

- National Library of Poland
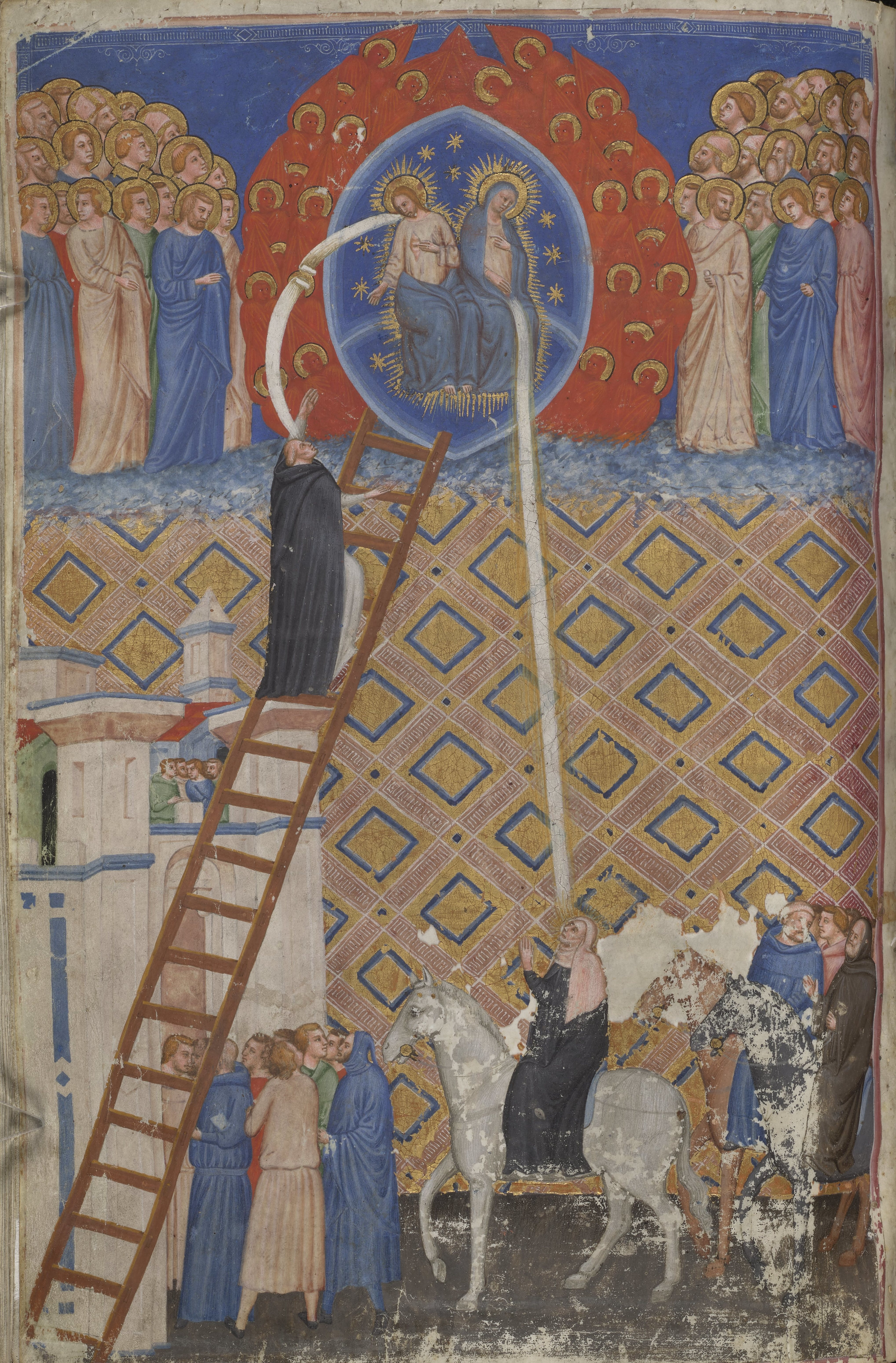
- Type: codex
- Date: between 1375 and 1377
- Place of origin: Italy
- Language(s): Latin
- Size: 26,5x18 cm, 425 leaves
- Accession: Rps 3310 II

Revelationes (Rps 3310 II) is a manuscript of Revelationes by Bridget of Sweden from 14th century.

The manuscript, produced in Italy, perhaps in Naples between 1375 and 1377 by Alfonsus de Vadaterra, is one of the oldest surviving copies of the original version of the Revelations. In the second half of the 14th century the manuscript was located in Rome in the possession of Matthaeus de Cracovia, who then brought it to Poland. From at least the 17th century the book was in the library of the prebendaries in the Holy Cross Chapel of the Krakow Cathedral. In 1819 it was presented to the Warsaw Society of the Friends of Science. After the defeat of the November Uprising it was seized by the Russians and taken to St Petersburg. Under the 1921 Treaty of Riga it returned to Poland and was placed in the collection of the National Library of Poland. In 1939 it was evacuated to Canada, from where it returned to Poland in 1959. From May 2024, the manuscript is presented at a permanent exhibition in the Palace of the Commonwealth.

The manuscript consists of 425 leaves, measuring 26,5x18 cm. It contains one full-page miniature shows an episode from the life of St. Bridget, six figurative initials and 409 large red-blue calligraphic initials. The illuminations are attributed to a Neapolitan artist known as Maestro del Seneca dei Girolamini. 409 large red-blue calligraphic initials.

== Bibliography ==
- Makowski, Tomasz; Sapała, Patryk, eds. (2024). The Palace of the Commonwealth. Three times opened. Treasures from the National Library of Poland at the Palace of the Commonwealth. Warsaw: National Library of Poland.
- Tchórzewska-Kabata, Halina; Dąbrowski, Maciej, eds. (2003). More precious than gold. Treasures of the Polish National Library (electronic version) (PDF). Translated by Dorosz, Janina. Warsaw: National Library of Poland. ISBN 83-7009-402-3.
