= Antiphonary of Abbot Mścisław =

Polish antiphonary from the late 14th or early 15th century

- National Library of Poland
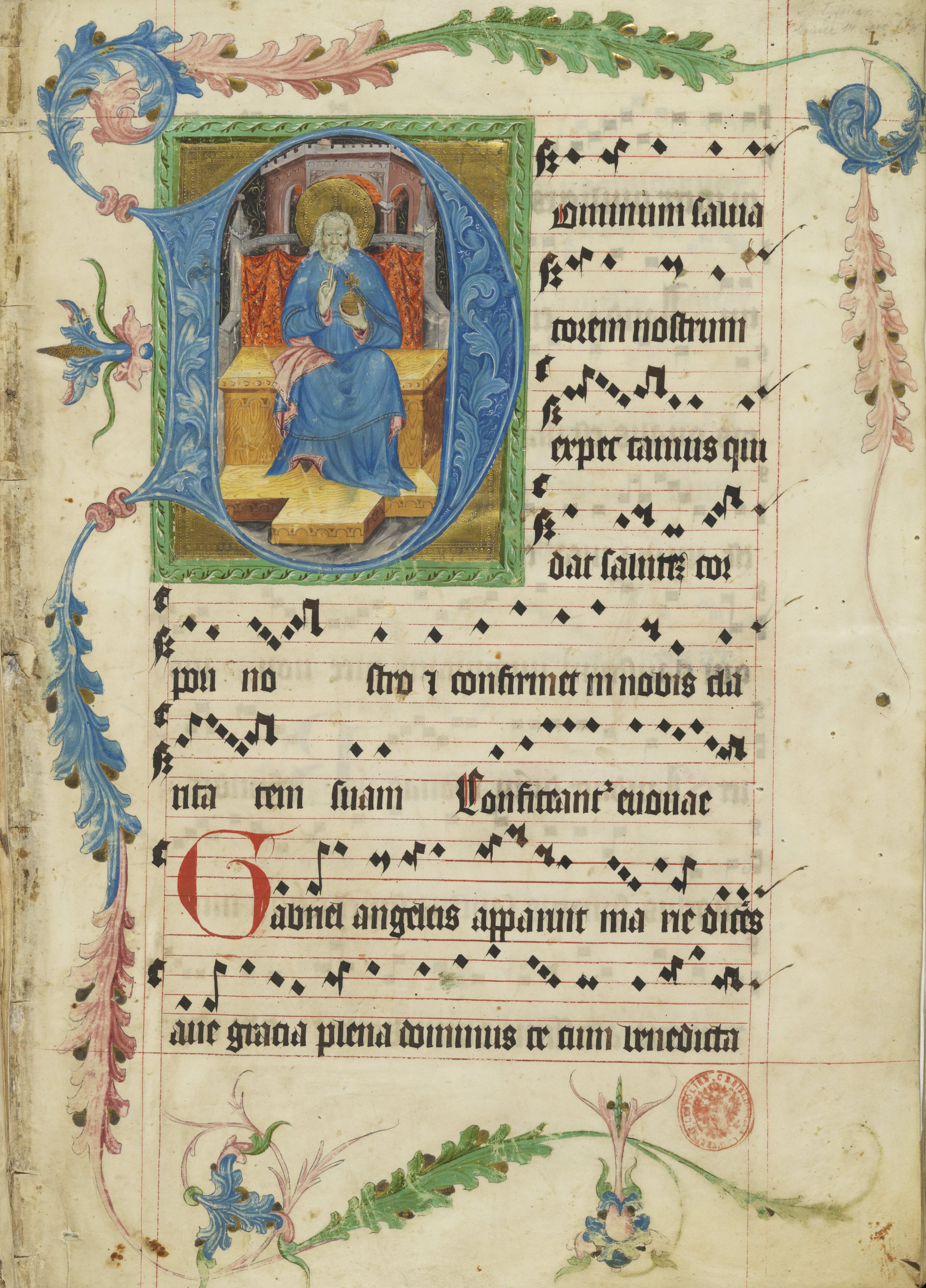
- Type: codex, antiphonary
- Date: 14th or early 15th century
- Place of origin: Benedictine Abbey in Tyniec
- Language: Latin
- Size: 56x38 cm, 328 lvs
- Accession: Rps 12720 V

Antiphonary of Abbot Mścisław (Polish: Antyfonarz opata Mścisława) is an illuminated antiphonary from the late 14th or early 15th century.

The manuscript was written and illuminated in the monastery scriptorium at Benedictine Abbey in Tyniec (currently a part of Kraków), compiled by Abbot Mścisław in the late 14th or early 15th century. It contains antiphons, or songs corresponding to particular parts of the liturgy, accompanied by musical notation. The antiphonary is decorated with illuminated initials. After the dissolution of the monastery by the Austrians in the early 19th century, the antiphonary was moved to the Library of Lviv University. It came to the National Library of Poland after World War II. From May 2024, the manuscript is presented at a permanent exhibition in the Palace of the Commonwealth.

== Bibliography ==
- Makowski, Tomasz; Sapała, Patryk, eds. (2024). The Palace of the Commonwealth. Three times opened. Treasures from the National Library of Poland at the Palace of the Commonwealth. Warsaw: National Library of Poland.
