= Przemyśl Meditation =

15th-century collection of apocryphal texts

- National Library of Poland
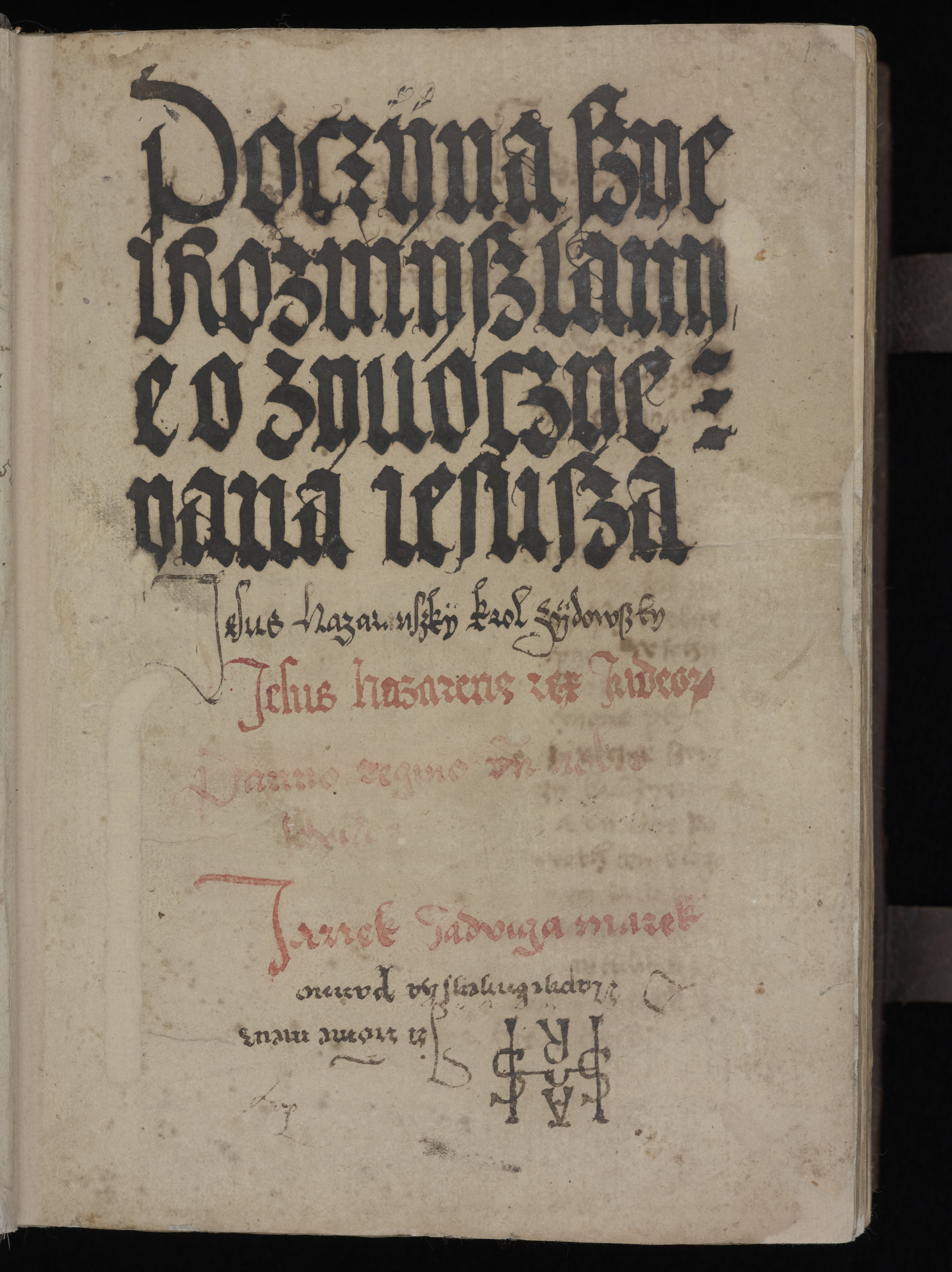
- Date: The end of the 15th century
- Language(s): Polish
- Size: 21.5x15.5 cm, 426 lvs
- Accession: Rps 8024 II

Przemyśl Meditation (Polish: Rozmyślanie przemyskie) is a collection of apocryphal texts in Polish from the end of the 15th century.

The manuscript is the most extensive monument of Polish medieval prose and apocryphal literature in the Polish language. The codex is probably a copy of an earlier work. It deals with the life of the Holy Virgin and Christ on the basis of the Gospels and such works as Petrus Comestorus's 12th century Historia Scholastica and the 13th century rhymed poem Vita Virginis Mariae rhythmica.

It was held by the Library of the Greek Catholic Chapter in Przemyśl from 1844. Since the end of the World War II it has formed part of the collection of the National Library of Poland. From May 2024, the manuscript is presented at a permanent exhibition in the Palace of the Commonwealth.

== Bibliography ==
- Makowski, Tomasz; Sapała, Patryk, eds. (2024). The Palace of the Commonwealth. Three times opened. Treasures from the National Library of Poland at the Palace of the Commonwealth. Warsaw: National Library of Poland.
- Tchórzewska-Kabata, Halina; Dąbrowski, Maciej, eds. (2003). More precious than gold. Treasures of the Polish National Library (electronic version) (PDF). Translated by Dorosz, Janina. Warsaw: National Library of Poland. ISBN 83-7009-402-3.
