= Gradual of the Kraków Augustinians =

Illuminated gradual from 1528

- National Library of Poland
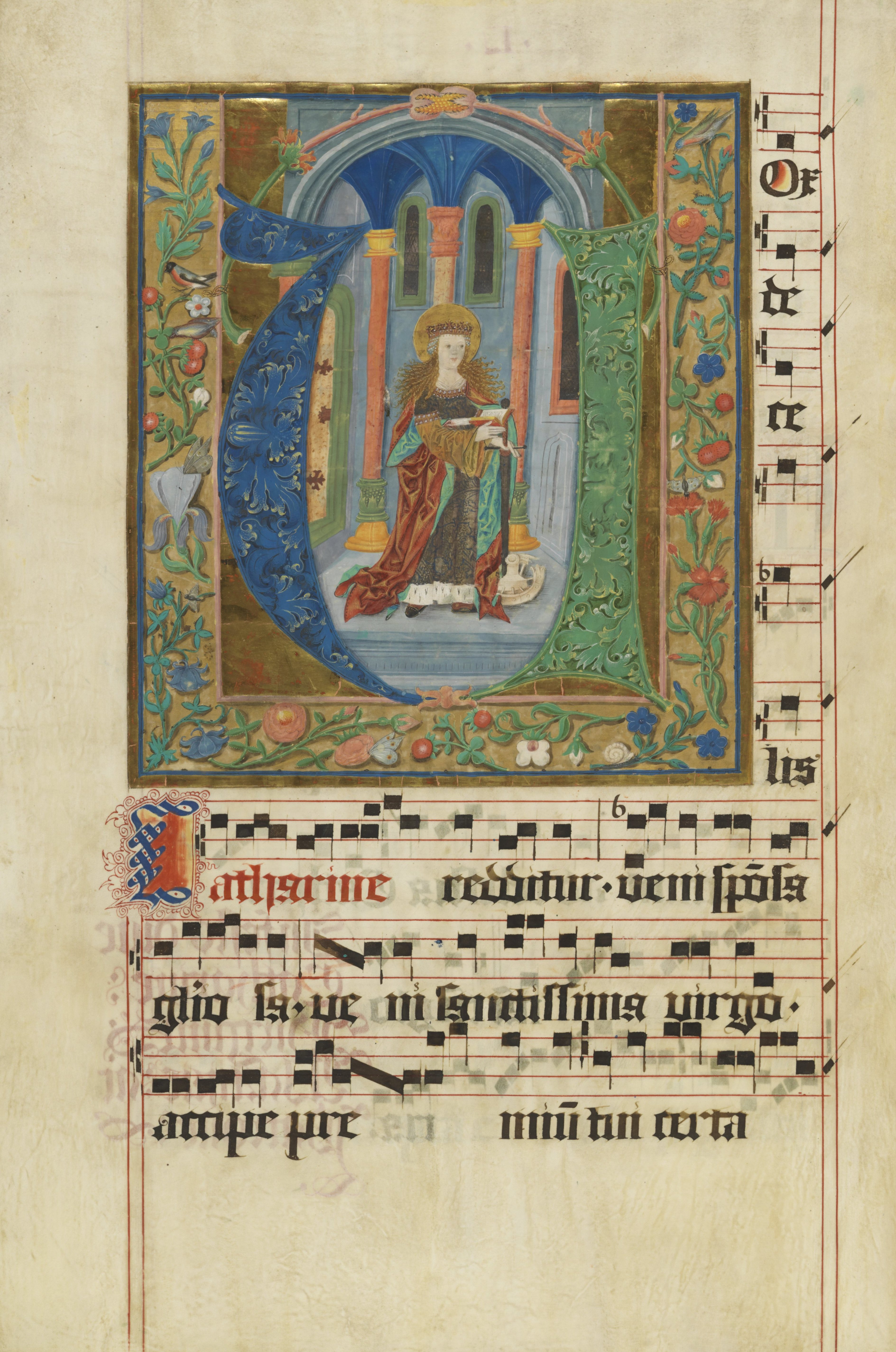
- Also known as: Graduale de sanctis
- Type: codex, gradual
- Language(s): Latin
- Size: 74x52 cm, 155 lvs
- Accession: Rps 3036 V

Gradual of the Kraków Augustinians (Polish: Graduał augustianów krakowskich) is an illuminated gradual from 1528.

A manuscript was written and illuminated at the Augustinian Eremite monastery in Kazimierz (currently part of Kraków) by Brother Jan. During the Partitions of Poland the manuscript was seized by the Russians. It returned to Poland under the terms of the 1921 Treaty of Riga. During World War II the Germans moved the manuscript to Kraków. It returned to the National Library of Poland after the war. From May 2024, the manuscript is presented at a permanent exhibition in the Palace of the Commonwealth.

The gradual contains the words and music of the liturgical chants for the celebration of the liturgy by the monks. The decorated manuscript features figural initials and numerous pen-flourished initials. One of them depicts Saint Catherine of Alexandria, the patron saint of the monastery.

== Bibliography ==
- Makowski, Tomasz; Sapała, Patryk, eds. (2024). The Palace of the Commonwealth. Three times opened. Treasures from the National Library of Poland at the Palace of the Commonwealth. Warsaw: National Library of Poland.
