= Tyniec Sacramentary =

- National Library of Poland
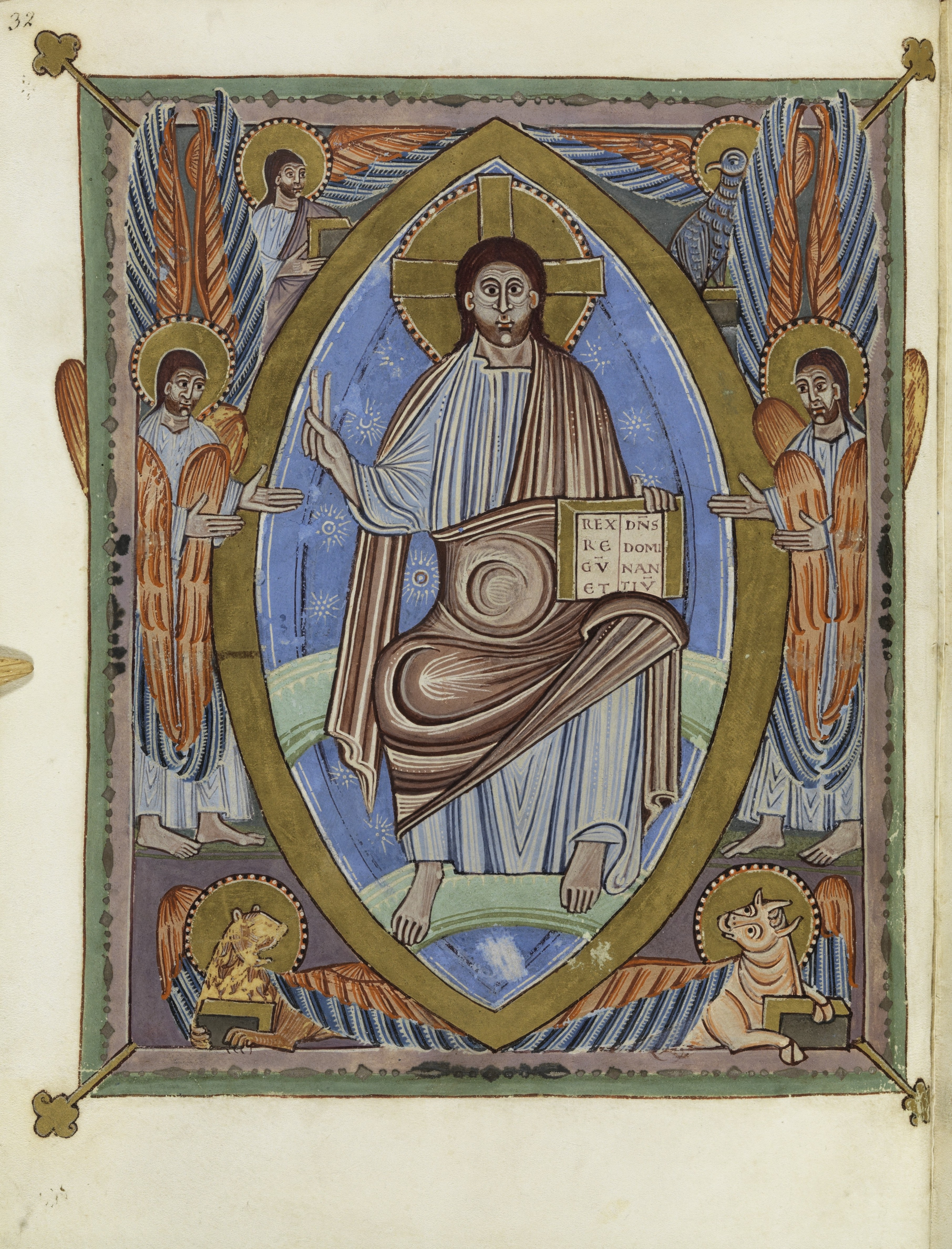
- Maiestas Domini (leaf 32)
- Also known as: Sacramentarium Tinecense
- Type: codex, sacramentary
- Date: c. 1072–1075
- Place of origin: Cologne
- Language: Latin
- Material: parchment
- Size: 28.5 cm × 22 cm (11.2 in × 8.7 in), 237 leaves
- Accession: Rps BOZ 8

The Tyniec Sacramentary is an Ottonian illuminated manuscript written in c. 1072–1075, probably near Cologne.

== History ==
It is one of the oldest surviving codices in Poland, where it first arrived during the Middle Ages, kept in Poland for almost 1,000 years. It was transcribed and decorated with illuminations in Cologne, probably at the Monastery of St Pantaleon around 1072–75. Shortly afterwards or in the 12th century it was offered to the Benedictine Abbey in Tyniec near Kraków. It was stolen during the Swedish invasion in the 17th century. Repurchased in Kraków, it returned to Tyniec. In 1814 the manuscript was bought from the monks by Stanisław Kostka Zamoyski and included in the library of the Zamoyski family in the Blue Palace in Warsaw.

During World War II the Nazis tried to take the manuscript to Berlin, but thanks to the endeavours of librarians, scholars and diplomats, they left it in the Zamoyski Library. After the Warsaw Uprising the manuscript was secretly evacuated and hidden in the collegiate church at Łowicz. After the war in 1946, Jan Zamoyski, the final owner of the Zamoyski family fee tail, deposited the family library with the National Library of Poland. Since May 2024, the manuscript has been exhibited at the permanent exhibition in the Palace of the Commonwealth in Warsaw.

== Description ==
The Sacramentary contains prayers for the priest celebrating Mass. Magnificently decorated, it is one of the most precious artefacts of the Ottonian manuscript painting school. The sumptuous form of The Sacramentary indicates that the codex belonged to the so-called king’s manuscripts, which reflected the monarchy’s splendour.

The manuscript consists of 470 pages. 38 of them is written in gold and silver on purple-stained parchment pages. Pages 7–30 contains a calendar. The manuscript contains 13 decorated initials (two full-page plaited initials) and two fullpage miniatures – the Crucifixion and the Maiestas Domini. It also contains the oldest musical notation in Poland in chironomic form.

== Bibliography ==
- Makowski, Tomasz; Sapała, Patryk, eds. (2024). The Palace of the Commonwealth. Three times opened. Treasures from the National Library of Poland at the Palace of the Commonwealth. Warsaw: National Library of Poland.
- Tchórzewska-Kabata, Halina; Dąbrowski, Maciej, eds. (2003). More precious than gold. Treasures of the Polish National Library (electronic version) (PDF). Translated by Dorosz, Janina. Warsaw: National Library of Poland. ISBN 83-7009-402-3.
