= Statuta Regni Poloniae =

First printed book of Polish land laws, 1487

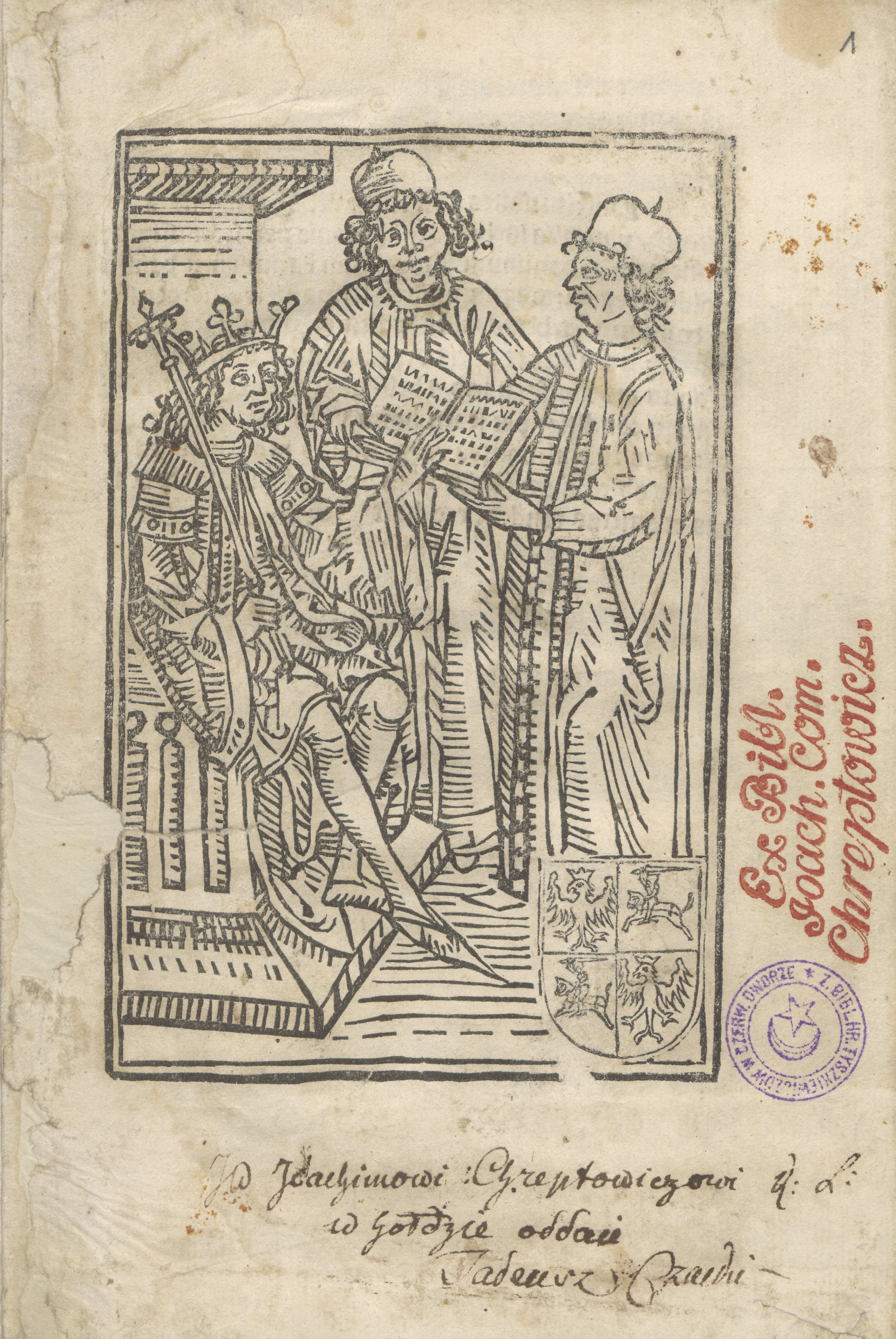
- Language: Latin
- Publisher: Konrad Kachelofen
- Publication date: 1487
- Publication place: Leipzig
- Pages: 56

Statuta Regni Poloniae (Syntagmata) is the first printed edition of Polish land laws from 1487

The book was published in Leipzig in 1487 at the printing house of Konrad Kachelofen. It is also known by the second part of its title as Syntagmata (Greek for compilation or collation). The work in Latin contains the statutes of Casimir the Great, Władysław II Jagiełło's Statute of Warta, and Casimir IV Jagiellon's Statutes of Nieszawa and Statute of Nowy Korczyn. The book consists of 56 leaves in quarto format From May 2024, a copy belonged to Tadeusz Czacki is presented at a permanent exhibition in the Palace of the Commonwealth.

== Bibliography ==
- Makowski, Tomasz; Sapała, Patryk, eds. (2024). The Palace of the Commonwealth. Three times opened. Treasures from the National Library of Poland at the Palace of the Commonwealth. Warsaw: National Library of Poland.
