= Portolan of Angelo Freducci =

1554 portolan chart

- National Library of Poland
- Type: portolan chart
- Date: 1554
- Place of origin: Ancona
- Size: 35,5x23,5 cm
- Accession: ZZK 0.2 401

Portolan of Angelo Freducci is a portolan chart by Angelo Freducci from 1554.

The portolan belonged to the library of the Zamoyski family. After the Warsaw Uprising it was taken by Germans to Austria. After the World War II it entered the collection of the National Library of Poland. From May 2024, the manuscript is presented at the permanent exhibition in the Palace of the Commonwealth.

The portolan is distinguished by its highly detailed depiction of the coast. It consists of five charts on parchment, together covering an area stretching from the western coasts of Europe, across the Mediterranean Sea, Black Sea, Red Sea, southern coast of the Arabian Peninsula and the Persian Gulf, to the Caspian Sea. On each chart is a linear scale without measurements.

== Bibliography ==
- Makowski, Tomasz; Sapała, Patryk, eds. (2024). The Palace of the Commonwealth. Three times opened. Treasures from the National Library of Poland at the Palace of the Commonwealth. Warsaw: National Library of Poland.
- Tchórzewska-Kabata, Halina; Dąbrowski, Maciej, eds. (2003). More precious than gold. Treasures of the Polish National Library (electronic version) (PDF). Translated by Dorosz, Janina. Warsaw: National Library of Poland. ISBN 83-7009-402-3.
