= Antiquities of the Jews (Rps BOZ 1) =

- National Library of Poland
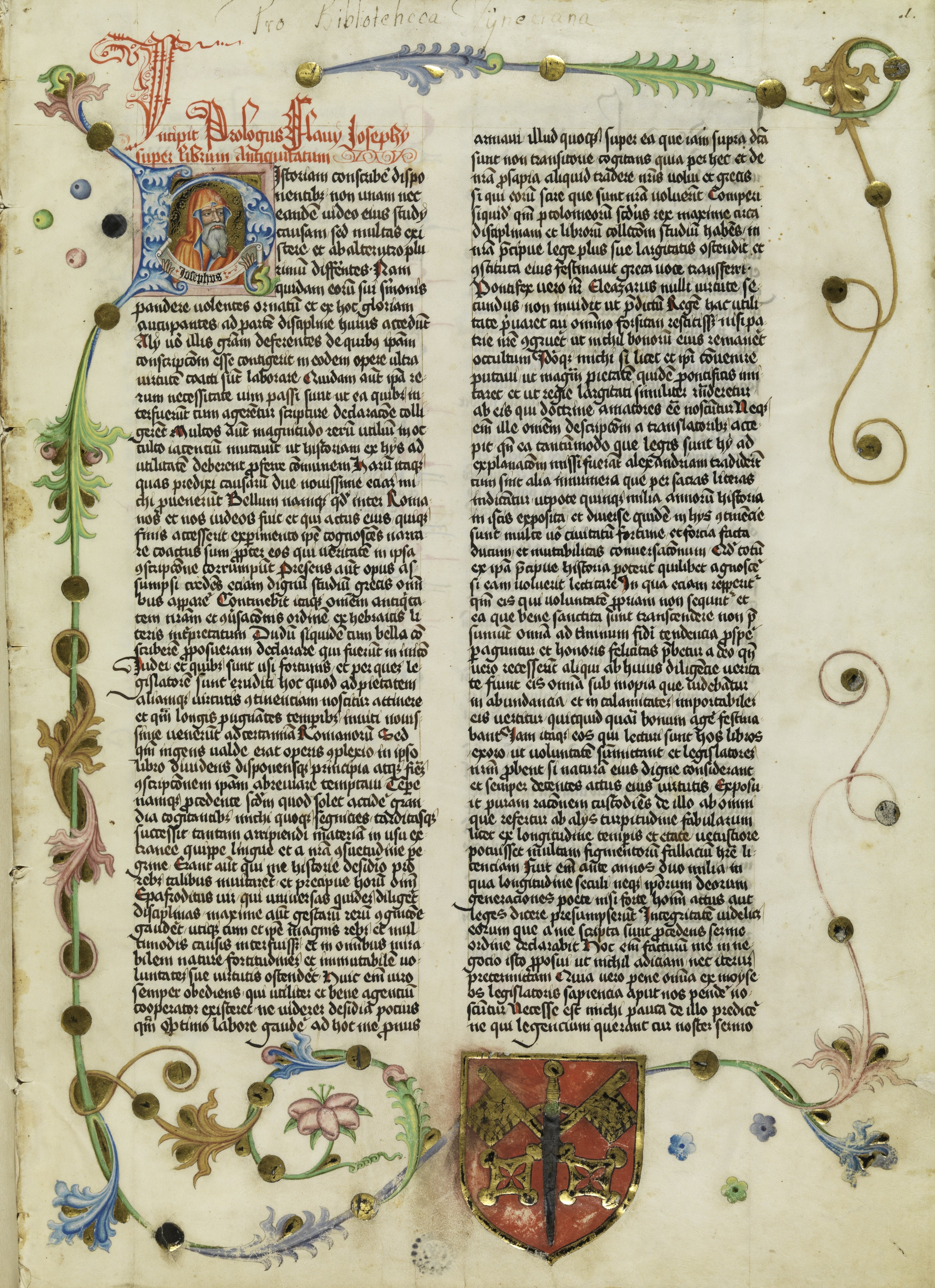
- Also known as: Antiquitates Iudaicae
- Type: Codex
- Date: 1466
- Place of origin: Kraków
- Language(s): Latin
- Scribe(s): Maciej (abbey's organist)
- Author(s): Flavius Josephus
- Illuminated by: Master of Kraków Cathedral's Missal (Master of the Virgin with the Unicorn)
- Patron: Maciej Skawinka
- Size: 45x32,5 cm, 448 pages
- Accession: Rps BOZ 1

Antiquities of the Jews (Latin: Antiquitates Iudaicae) is an illuminated manuscript from 1466 containing Antiquities of the Jews by Flavius Josephus.

== History ==
The manuscript is a case of a medieval book made entirely in Poland that has survived unchanged to the present day. It was commissioned by the Maciej Skawinka, abbot of the Benedictines in Tyniec, written and illuminated in Kraków in 1466. The binding was made by a bookbinder also in Kraków. In 1815, it was sold to Stanisław Kostka Zamoyski and incorporated into the library of the Zamoyski family in the Blue Palace in Warsaw. After the Second World War, Jan Zamoyski, the final owner of the Zamoyski family fee tail, deposited the family library with the National Library of Poland. From May 2024, the manuscript is presented at a permanent exhibition in the Palace of the Commonwealth in Warsaw.

== Description ==
The manuscript contains twelve of the series of twenty books by the Jewish historian Flavius Josephus. The codex was copied by the abbey's organist Maciej in Gothic script in two columns. The Gothic binding of wooden boards covered with blind-tooled brown leather was made sometime after 1466. The tome is decorated with 15 initials, seven of which are figurative representations of themes taken from the Old Testament. The manuscript's decorations are the work of two Kraków illuminators. The majority of the miniatures was painted by the Master of Kraków Cathedral's Missal, also called the Master of the Virgin with the Unicorn. The margins are ornamented by multicoloured floral patterns. The abbey's coat of arms is in the first page.

== Bibliography ==
- Makowski, Tomasz; Sapała, Patryk, eds. (2024). The Palace of the Commonwealth. Three times opened. Treasures from the National Library of Poland at the Palace of the Commonwealth. Warsaw: National Library of Poland.
- Tchórzewska-Kabata, Halina; Dąbrowski, Maciej, eds. (2003). More precious than gold. Treasures of the Polish National Library (electronic version) (PDF). Translated by Dorosz, Janina. Warsaw: National Library of Poland. ISBN 83-7009-402-3.
