= Potocki Psalter =

- National Library of Poland
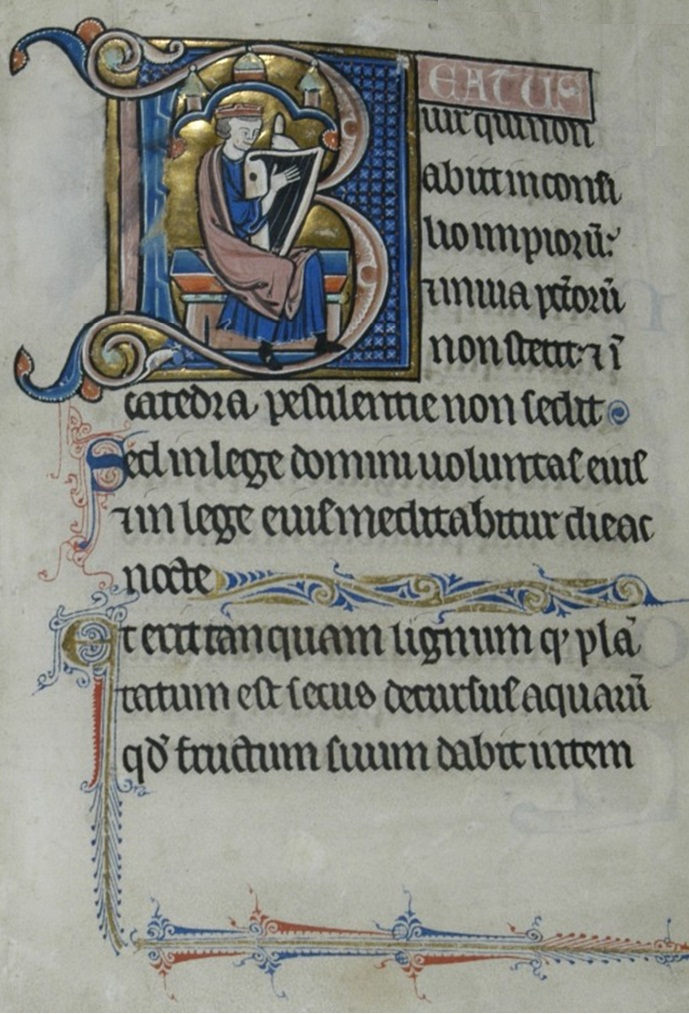
- Also known as: Wilanow Psalter
- Type: codex, psalter
- Date: between 1225 and 1250
- Place of origin: Paris
- Language(s): Latin, French
- Size: 15,5x10,5 cm, 170 leaves
- Accession: Rps 8003 I

Potocki Psalter (Wilanów Psalter) is an illuminated French psalter from 13th century.

The psalter was produced in Paris between 1225 and 1250, probably to be used in northern France. At the beginning of the 19th century it probably was purchased in Paris for Stanisław Kostka Potocki's Wilanów Library. In 1932 or 1933 the Branicki family donated the book to the National Library of Poland together with the Wilanów collection. In 1939 it was evacuated to Canada and returned to Poland in 1959. From May 2024, the manuscript is presented at a permanent exhibition in the Palace of the Commonwealth.

The psalter is written in Latin and French on quality parchment in careful Gothic minuscule in one column. It contains 170 leaves, measuring 15,5x10,5 cm.

The manuscript is regarded as one of the best works of Paris studios in the early Gothic period. It originally contained ten full-page miniatures depicting events from the life of Christ, but they were so valuable that some of them were cut out and are now in foreign museums. The copy in the National Library of Poland contains four miniatures: The Betrayal, Christ’s entry into Jerusalem, The Three Maries at the Tomb, and The Flagellation. The Crucifixion is now at the Museum of Fine Arts in Boston, and The Adoration of the Magi, The Offering in the Temple, The Flight to Egypt and The Baptism are in R.E. Hart's collection at the Blackburn Museum and Art Gallery. The manuscript is also ornamented with six figurative initials, small calligraphic initials and colourful interlines. The initials and miniatures were done by two different artists.

== Bibliography ==
- Makowski, Tomasz; Sapała, Patryk, eds. (2024). The Palace of the Commonwealth. Three times opened. Treasures from the National Library of Poland at the Palace of the Commonwealth. Warsaw: National Library of Poland.
- Tchórzewska-Kabata, Halina; Dąbrowski, Maciej, eds. (2003). More precious than gold. Treasures of the Polish National Library (electronic version) (PDF). Translated by Dorosz, Janina. Warsaw: National Library of Poland. ISBN 83-7009-402-3.
