= Album of Turkish costumes =

Collection of 17th-century images

- National Library of Poland
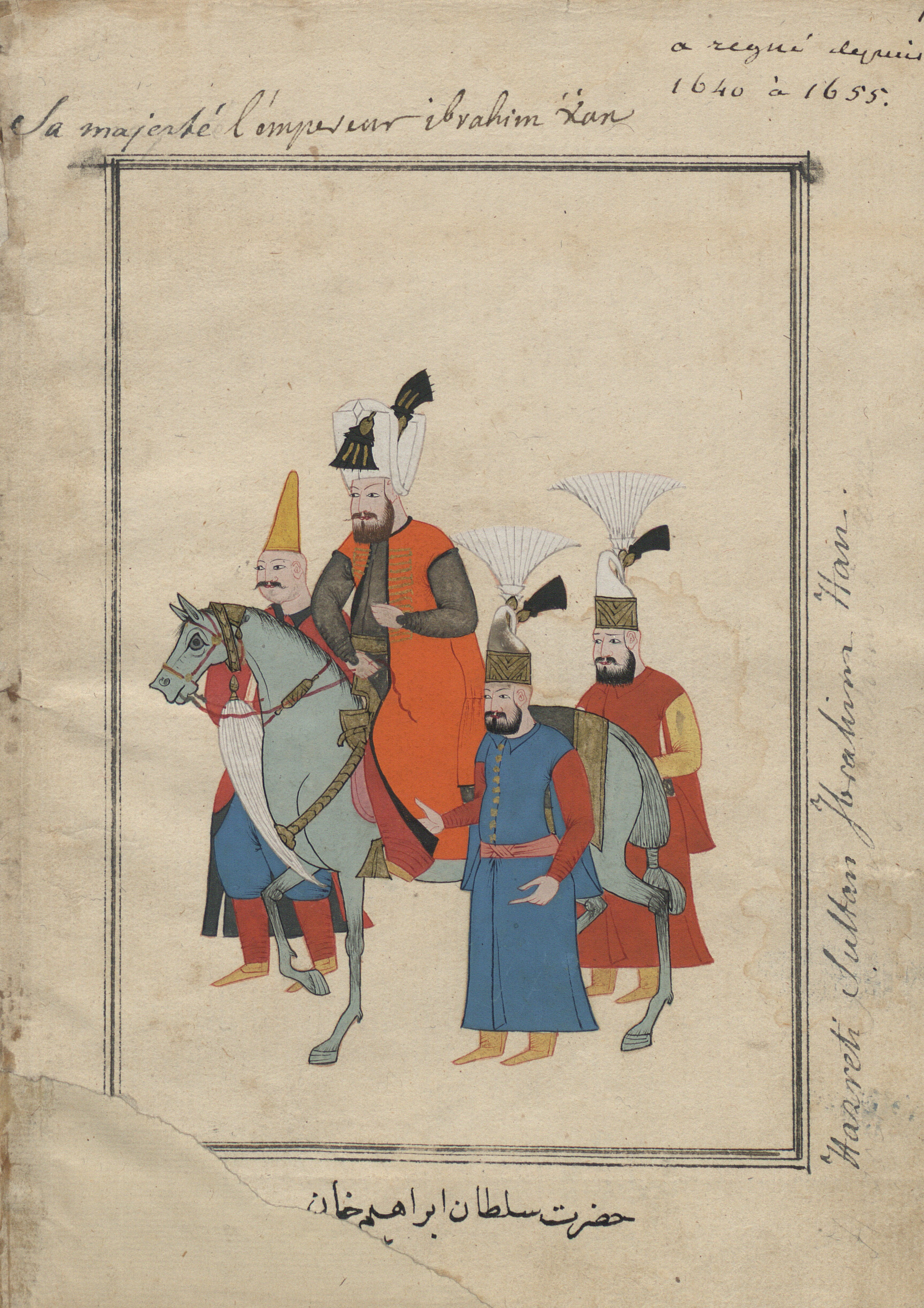
- Type: collection of images
- Date: 17th century
- Language(s): Turkish, French
- Size: 21x15 cm, 101 leaves
- Accession: Rps BOZ 165

Album of Turkish costumes is a collection of 90 miniatures from 17th century depicting dignitaries and functionaries of the Sultan's court from the reign of Ibrahim I.

The album was purchased in Paris in 1802 by Stanisław Kostka Zamoyski. After the World War II it entered the collection of the National Library of Poland. From May 2024, the manuscript is presented at the permanent exhibition in the Palace of the Commonwealth.

Each page of the manuscript features a picture with a caption in Turkish, written in Arabic script, and a transcription in Latin script. An explanation of the Turkish terms has been added in French. The first page depicts the Sultan on horseback, surrounded by his courtiers. Later in the collection are images of commanders, officials, falconer and the official responsible for serving coffee.

== Bibliography ==
- Makowski, Tomasz; Sapała, Patryk, eds. (2024). The Palace of the Commonwealth. Three times opened. Treasures from the National Library of Poland at the Palace of the Commonwealth. Warsaw: National Library of Poland.
