= Gradual of Abbot Mścisław =

Polish gradual from around 1390

- National Library of Poland
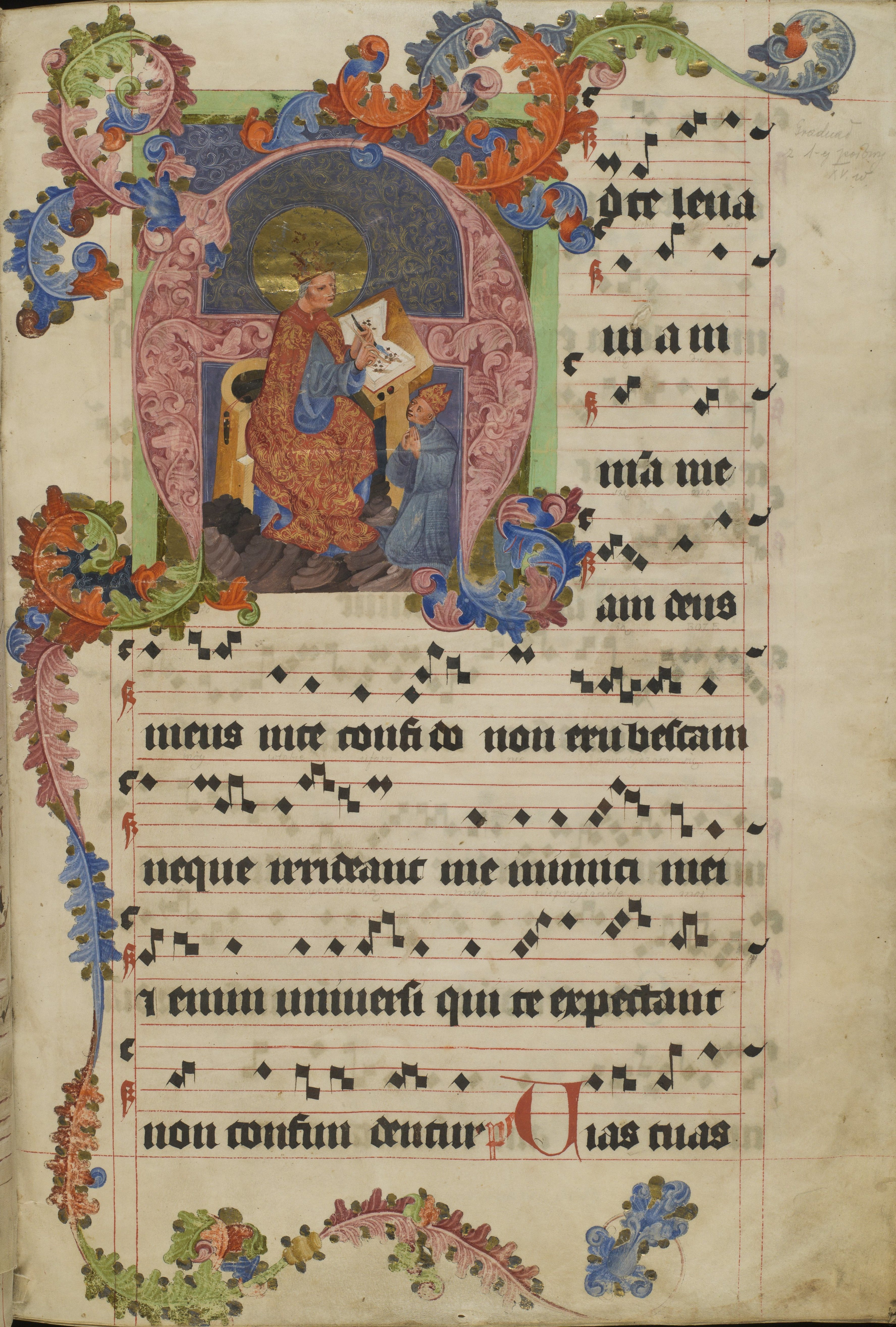
- Also known as: Graduale de tempore et de sanctis
- Type: codex, gradual
- Date: c. 1390
- Place of origin: Benedictine Abbey in Tyniec
- Language(s): Latin
- Size: 55.5x38 cm, 328 lvs (656 pp.)
- Accession: Rps 12722 V

Gradual of Abbot Mścisław (Polish: Graduał opata Mścisława) is an illuminated gradual from around 1390.

The gradual was produced around 1390 on the initiative of Mścisław, abbot of the Benedictine Abbey in Tyniec (currently a part of Kraków). The Gradual was used for a long time. This is indicated by the additions from 1569 the index dating from 1632 and 16th-century binding. After the dissolution of the Tyniec monastery in 1817, the manuscript was transferred to the Library of Lviv University. It came to the National Library of Poland after World War II.

The manuscript contains liturgical songs along with a musical notation, richly decorated by illuminators from Lesser Poland. The decoration of the manuscript was done by two painters and completed by a third. The pages are adorned with 11 initials with figurative miniatures and floral decorations on the margins. The first page of the codex contains an image of Abbot Mścisław himself praying at the side of St Gregory the Great.

From May 2024, the manuscript is presented at a permanent exhibition in the Palace of the Commonwealth.

== Bibliography ==
- Makowski, Tomasz; Sapała, Patryk, eds. (2024). The Palace of the Commonwealth. Three times opened. Treasures from the National Library of Poland at the Palace of the Commonwealth. Warsaw: National Library of Poland.
- Tchórzewska-Kabata, Halina; Dąbrowski, Maciej, eds. (2003). More precious than gold. Treasures of the Polish National Library (electronic version) (PDF). Translated by Dorosz, Janina. Warsaw: National Library of Poland. ISBN 83-7009-402-3.
