= The Faithful River =

Book by Stefan Żeromski

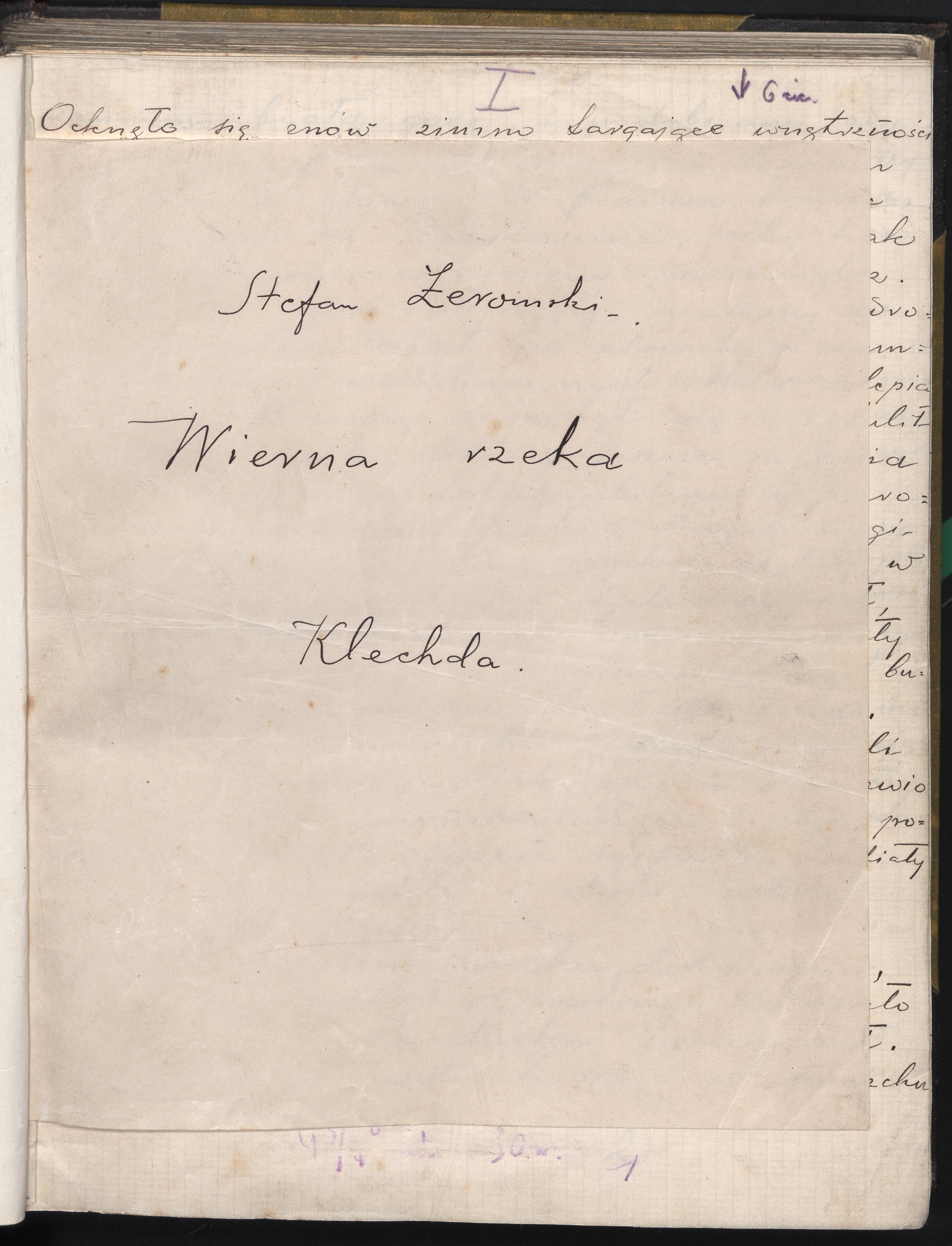
- The manuscript of Wierna rzeka
- Author: Stefan Żeromski
- Language: Polish
- Genre: Novel
- Published: 1912

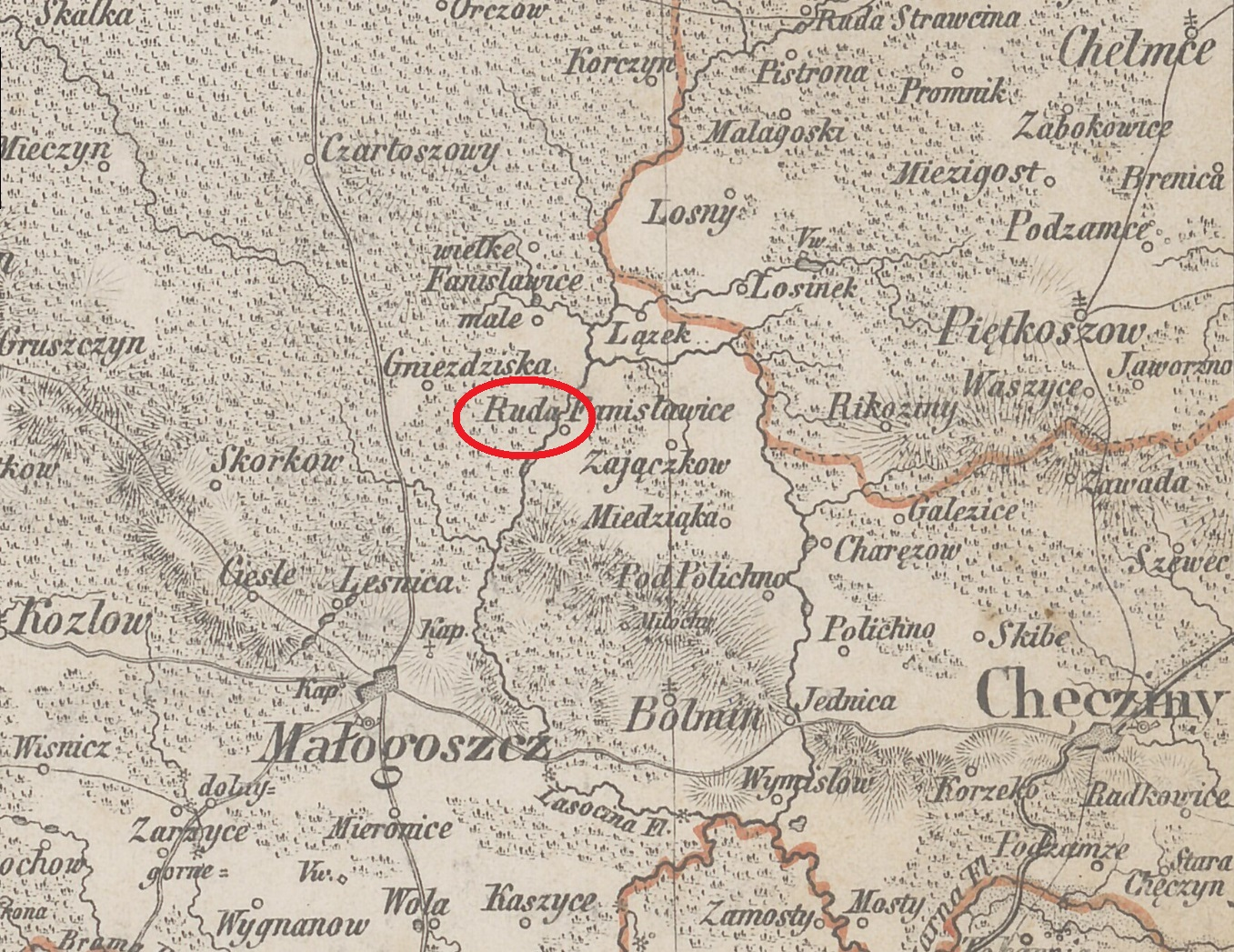
Location of the plot of the novel (map from the 19th century)

The Faithful River is a 1912 novel written in Paris by Polish writer Stefan Żeromski. The novel is set in Poland during the January Uprising from 1863 to 1865 and chronicles the story of a wounded soldier who is nursed back to health by a young maiden in charge of the manor house of her absent owners. It focuses on personal stories, triumphs, and tribulations in times of war.

From May 2024, a fair copy of the novel in the author’s own hand is presented at a permanent exhibition in the Palace of the Commonwealth in Warsaw.

== Title ==
The title river is the Salmon (or Salosina, now the Faithful River), on which the mansion stands and which appears at the most important moments of the novel. It is a "faithful" river, because it becomes a help at the most dramatic moments for the characters and because it is able to keep their deepest secrets. The river rescues the fleeing insurgent, the main character of the novel, and washes his wounds. It effectively prevents the Muscovites from intercepting the secret plans and list of insurgents' names, which were being transported by the trapped commissioner of the National Government. And finally to her he entrusts Salomea, the main character, with the money received in exchange for his lost love. The author then gives the river the characteristics of a faithful and empathetic friend.

== English translations ==
A translation of the novel into English, by Stephen Garry, was published in 1943. A second translation, by Bill Johnston, was published in 1999.
