= Calendarium Parisiense =

Illuminated manuscript

- National Library of Poland
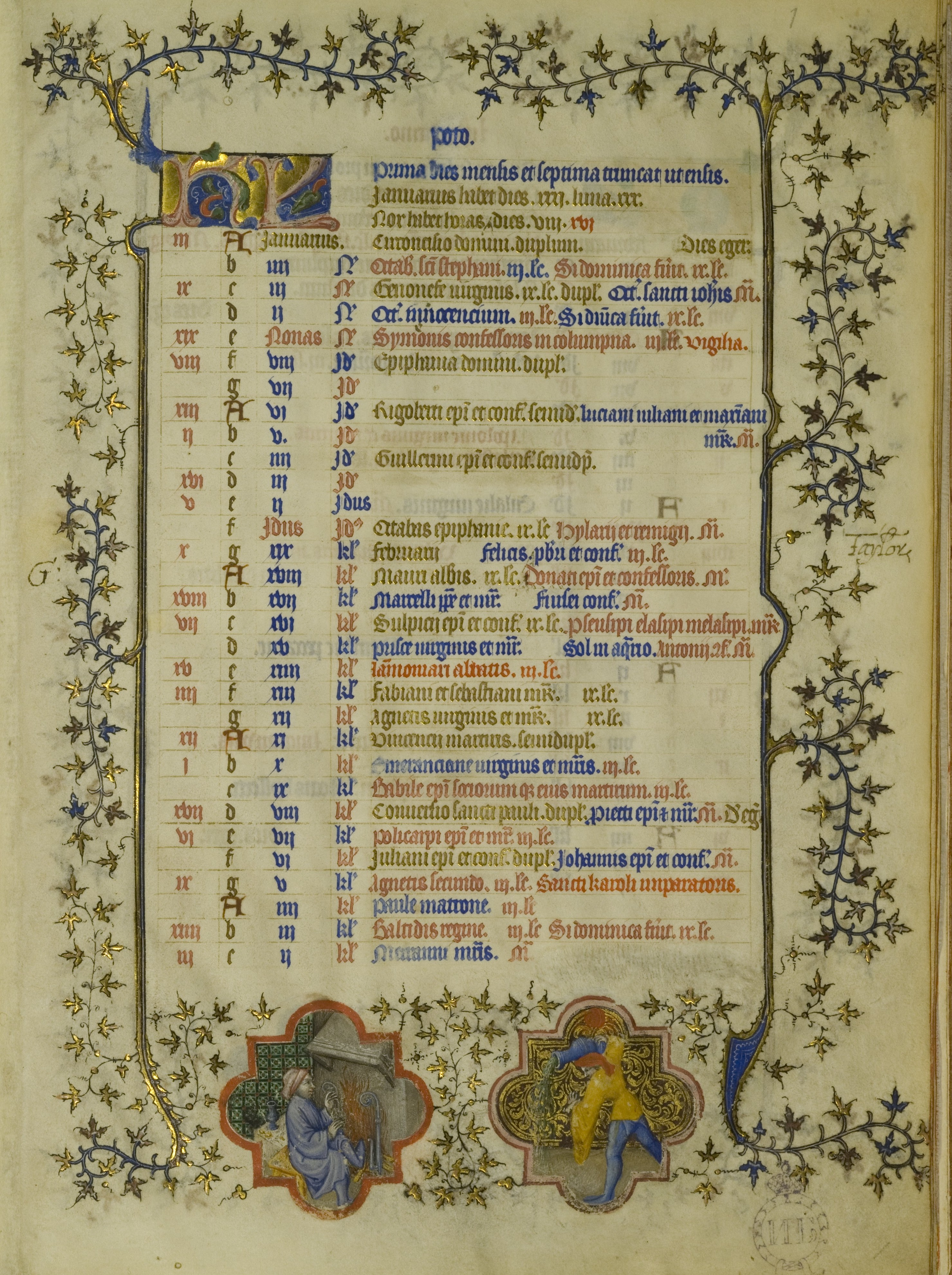
- Type: codex
- Date: late 14th century
- Place of origin: Paris
- Language: Latin
- Size: 25x18 cm, 7 lvs
- Accession: Rps 3309 II

Calendarium Parisiense (English: The Parisian Calendar) is an illuminated manuscript from the 14th century, containing a calendar.

The manuscript was produced in late 14th century, probably in one of the scriptoriums in Paris. It was brought to Poland from France by Józef Andrzej Załuski in the first half of the 18th century and placed in the Załuski Library, first Polish National Library. After the Kościuszko Insurrection the Russians took the manuscript to St Petersburg, together with the Załuski Library. It was recovered after the Treaty of Riga (1921) and transferred to the National Library of Poland. Evacuated to Canada in 1939, it returned to Poland in 1959. From May 2024, the manuscript is presented at a permanent exhibition in the Palace of the Commonwealth.

The manuscript is an example of French medieval illuminated manuscript. It contains a liturgical calendar with the days dedicated to specific saints clearly indicated. The manuscript consists of twelve pages, one for each month. At the bottom of each page are representations of labours appropriate to each of the months and Zodiac signs. This is followed by information in four columns: the days of the astronomical calendar according to the lunar cycle, the days of the week according to the Church calendar, the calends, nones and ides of the Julian calendar, church feasts and the names of saints. All the pages of the manuscript are bordered with fillets with branches of gold-leafed hawthorn shooting from them.

== Bibliography ==
- Makowski, Tomasz; Sapała, Patryk, eds. (2024). The Palace of the Commonwealth. Three times opened. Treasures from the National Library of Poland at the Palace of the Commonwealth. Warsaw: National Library of Poland.
- Tchórzewska-Kabata, Halina; Dąbrowski, Maciej, eds. (2003). More precious than gold. Treasures of the Polish National Library (electronic version) (PDF). Translated by Dorosz, Janina. Warsaw: National Library of Poland. ISBN 83-7009-402-3.
