= Old Annals of the Holy Cross =

Oldest Polish written history

- National Library of Poland
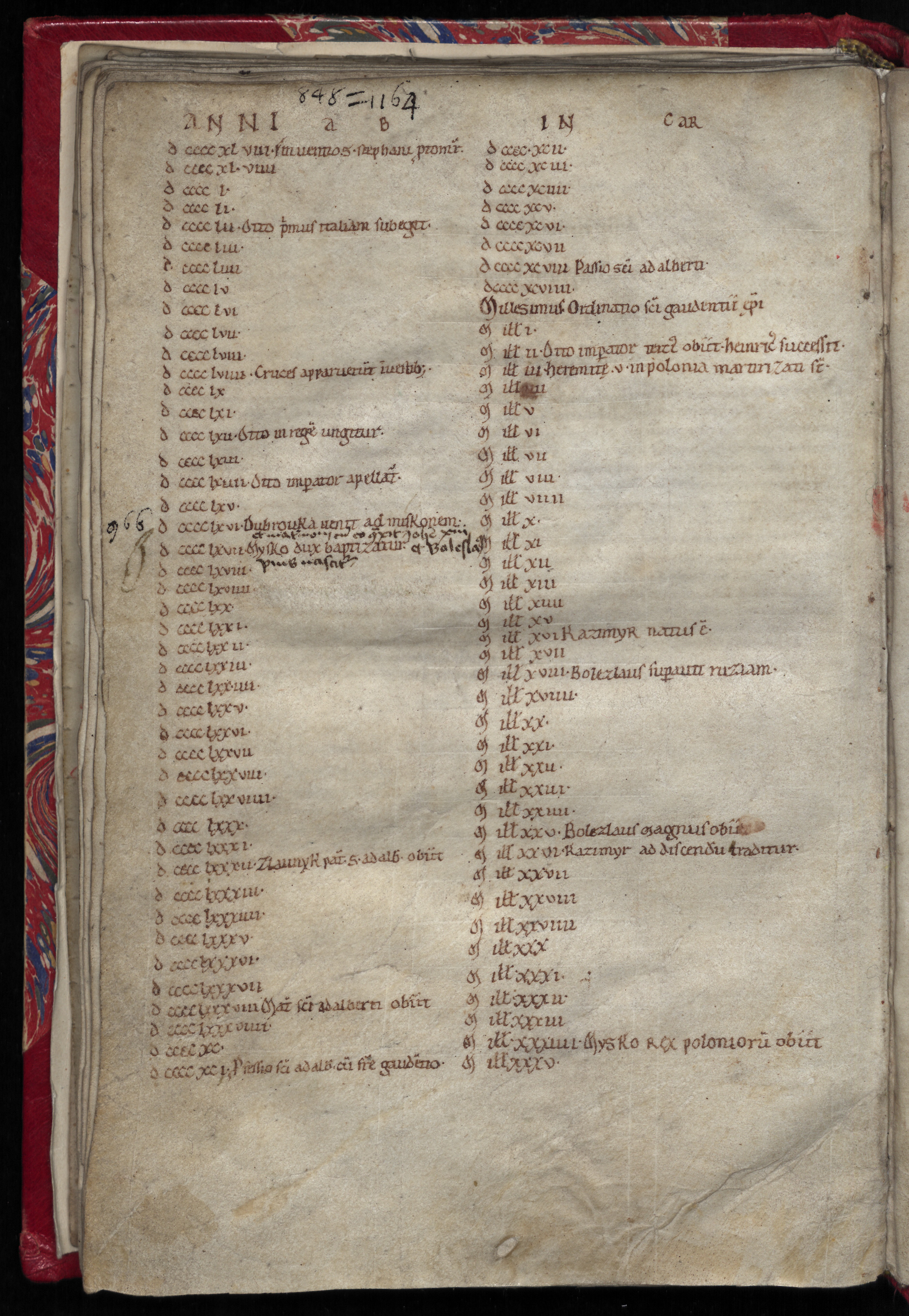
- Type: codex
- Date: first half of the 12th century
- Language: Latin
- Size: 22x14 cm, 40 lvs.
- Accession: Rps 3312 II

Old Annals of the Holy Cross (Polish: Rocznik świętokrzyski dawny) is the oldest Polish written history, recording key events from the very beginnings of the Polish state.

Annals dating from the first half of the 12th century (probably between 1122 and 1136), but its creator took the informations from an earlier yearbook Annales Regni Polonorum deperditi that has not survived. Its name is traditional, deriving from the place where it was stored – the Benedictine library at the Holy Cross Abbey on Łysa Góra. From at least the 13th century it belonged to the Krakow chapter, from the middle of the 15th century it belonged to the Holy Cross monastery, and in the middle of the 18th century it was acquired by the Załuski Library. After the Kościuszko Uprising Russians seized the library's holdings and transported them to Saint Petersburg. Recovered after the Treaty of Riga (1921), it was transferred to the National Library. It was evacuated to Canada in 1939 and returned in 1959. From May 2024, the manuscript is presented at a permanent exhibition in the Palace of the Commonwealth.

The Old Annals of the Holy Cross was written in one or two columns without ornamentation on the three last clean pages of an earlier codex, probably from northern France. The work consists of short, one-sentence notes in Latin, assigned to individual years, for example Dubrovka venit ad Miskonem, Mysko dux baptizatur. The manuscript contains entries concerning events that took place between 948 and 1119, from the period between 1119 and 1122, information from 1136 and a few supplementary notes added in the 15th century.

== Bibliography ==
- Makowski, Tomasz; Sapała, Patryk, eds. (2024). The Palace of the Commonwealth. Three times opened. Treasures from the National Library of Poland at the Palace of the Commonwealth. Warsaw: National Library of Poland.
- Tchórzewska-Kabata, Halina; Dąbrowski, Maciej, eds. (2003). More precious than gold. Treasures of the Polish National Library (electronic version) (PDF). Translated by Dorosz, Janina. Warsaw: National Library of Poland. ISBN 83-7009-402-3.
- Witt, Maria (2005). "The Zaluski Collection in Warsaw". The Strange Life of One of the Greatest European Libraries of the Eighteenth Century. FYI France. Archived from the original on 2021-03-01.
