= The Life of the Lord Jesus Christ (book) =

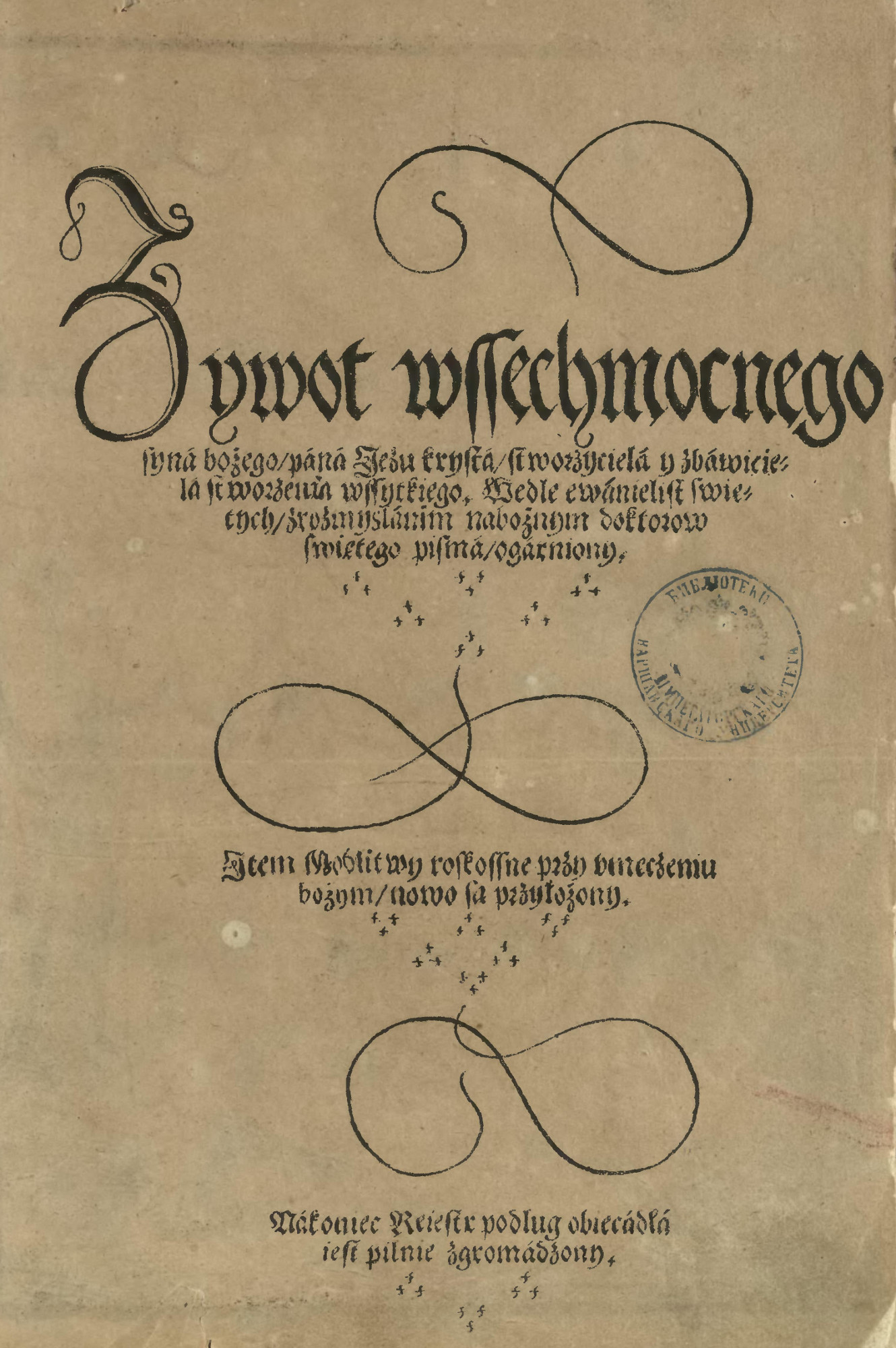
- Title page
- Author: Baltazar Opec
- Original title: Żywot Pana Jezu Krysta
- Illustrator: Hans Leonhard Schäufelein
- Language: Polish
- Publisher: Hieronymus Vietor
- Publication date: 1522
- Publication place: Poland

The Life of the Lord Jesus Christ (Polish: Żywot Pana Jezu Krysta) is the oldest entirely preserved printed book in Polish by Baltazar Opec, published in 1522.

It is a reworking of a composition, combining the biblical text with apocryphal themes, traditionally attributed to St Bonaventure, Meditationes vitae Christi (Meditations on the Life of Christ). . It also features 39 full-page woodcuts by Hans Leonhard Schäufelein. One of a copies belonged to the library of the Zamoyski family fee tail, which was transferred to the National Library of Poland after the Second World War. From May 2024, one of the few survived copies is presented at a permanent exhibition in the Palace of the Commonwealth.

== Bibliography ==
- Makowski, Tomasz; Sapała, Patryk, eds. (2024). The Palace of the Commonwealth. Three times opened. Treasures from the National Library of Poland at the Palace of the Commonwealth. Warsaw: National Library of Poland.
