= Theatre of the Virtues of the Venerable Stanislaus Hosius =

- National Library of Poland
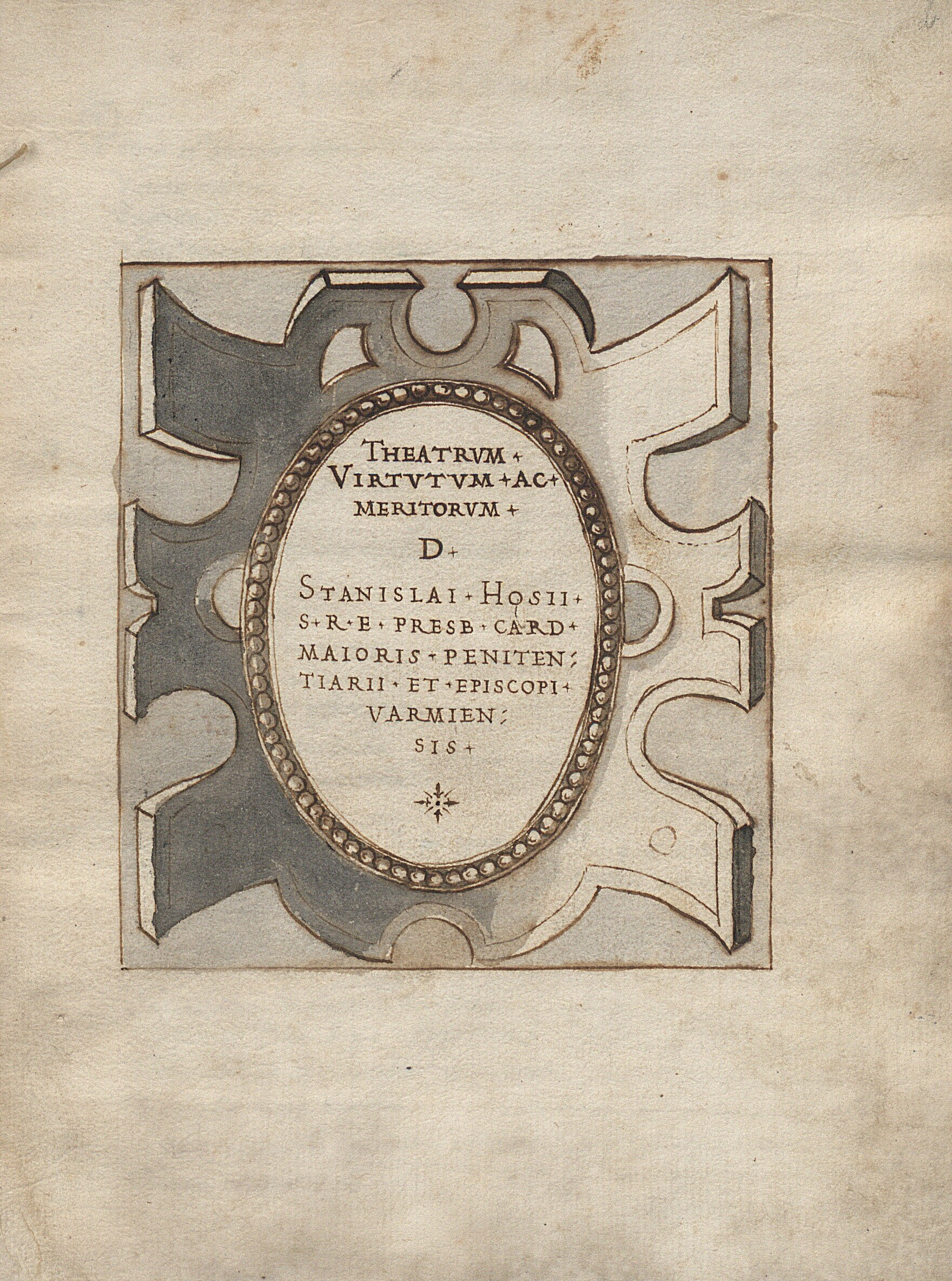
- Title page
- Also known as: Theatrum virtutum ac meritorum D. Stanislai Hosii S.R.E. presb. card., maioris penitentiarii et episcopi Varmiensis
- Date: the end of the 16th century
- Place of origin: Poland
- Language: Latin
- Size: 21x15,5 cm, 120 leaves
- Accession: Rps BOZ 130

Theatre of the Virtues of the Venerable Stanislaus Hosius is a collection of 105 drawings by the engraver Tomasz Treter, depicting the life of Stanislaus Hosius.

Stanislaus Hosius was Bishop of Warmia and a cardinal, Royal Secretary and one of an important figures of the European Counter-Reformation. The manuscript belonged to the library of the Zamoyski family. During World War II it was sent from Warsaw to Goerbitsch by Germans. From there, the Russians transported it to Moscow. The manuscript returned to Poland in 1947. It found its way, along with other items from the library of the Zamoyski family, to the National Library of Poland. From May 2024, the manuscript is presented at a permanent exhibition in the Palace of the Commonwealth.

The manuscript was created at the end of the 16th century. It consists of 120 leaves measuring 21x15,5 cm. The manuscript contains 105 drawings depicting the life of Hosius (partly allegorically), odes in honor of Hosius and two colorful watercolors with figures of Polish nobility. The drawings formed the basis for copperplate engravings also made by Treter.

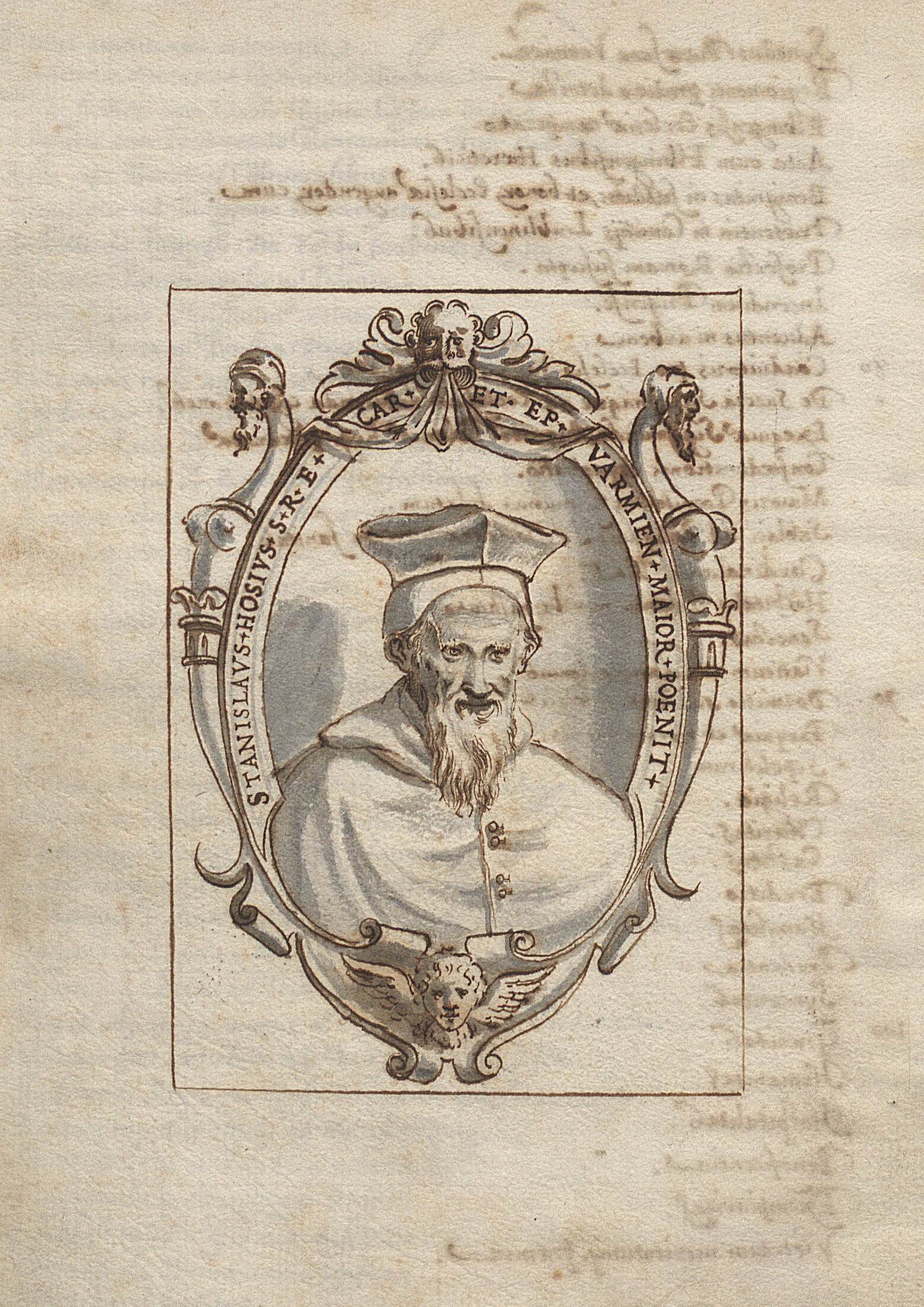
Portrait of Stanislaus Hosius

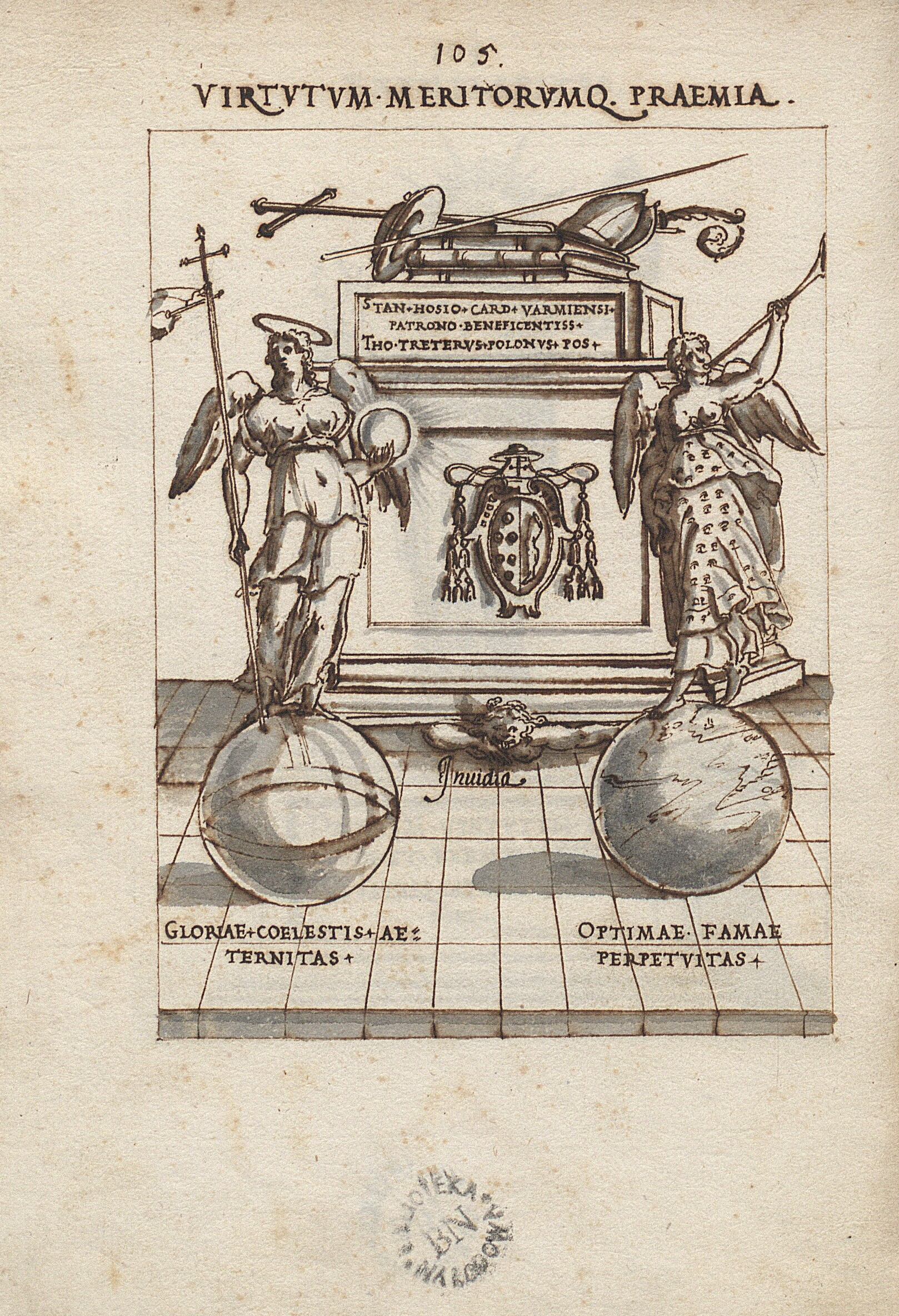
Thomb of Hosius

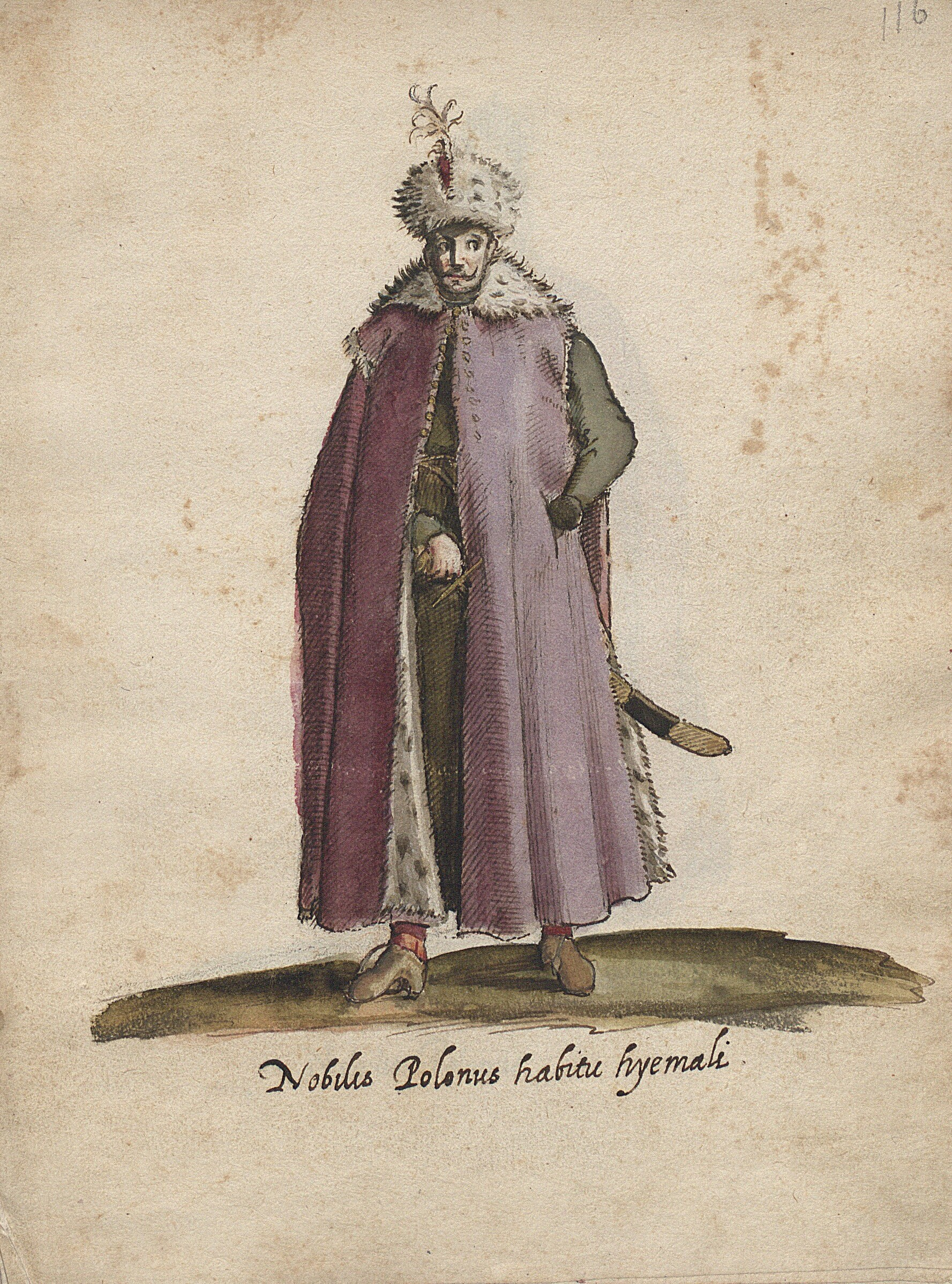
Polish nobleman

== Bibliography ==
- Makowski, Tomasz; Sapała, Patryk, eds. (2024). The Palace of the Commonwealth. Three times opened. Treasures from the National Library of Poland at the Palace of the Commonwealth. Warsaw: National Library of Poland.
