= Evangelistarium (Rps 3311 I) =

11th-century illuminated manuscript

- National Library of Poland
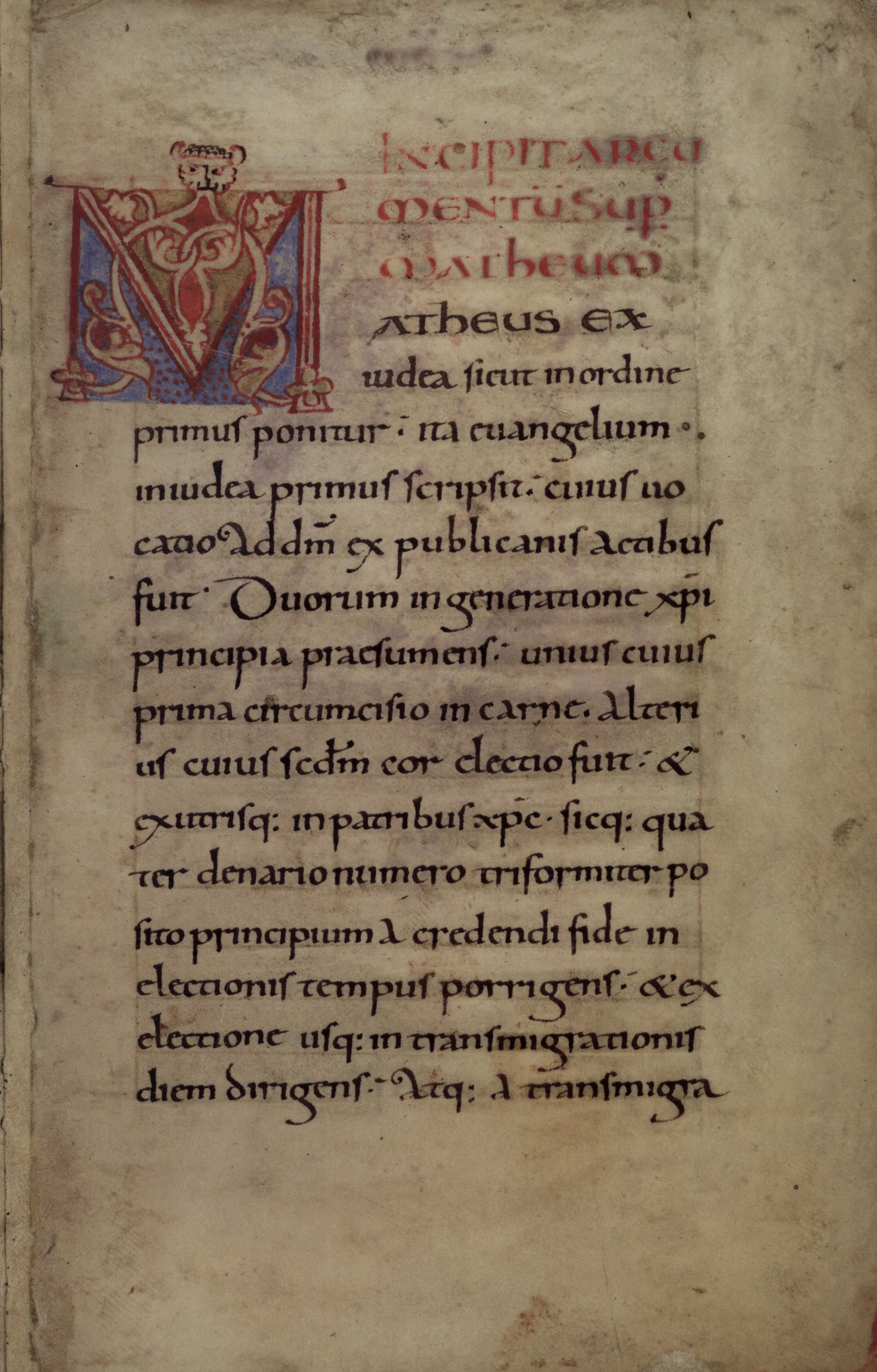
- Type: codex, evangelistary
- Date: 11th century
- Language(s): Latin
- Size: 15,5x10 cm, 151 leaves
- Accession: Rps 3311 I

Evangelistarium (The Lectionary) is the oldest hand-written lectionary in Polish libraries from 11th century.

The manuscript was written around the A. D. 1000, but a few of the ornaments having been added in the second quarter of the 11th century. Some have argued that it was written in the borderlands of France and Flanders, as indicated by the West Frankish and Anglo-Saxon influences seen in its ornamentation. However, the consensus of historians of early medieval England is that it is the product of an English scriptorium. The history of The Lectionary is unknown. It was probably purchased in 18th century for the Załuski Library, the first Polish National Library. After the Kościuszko Insurrection the codex was carried away to St. Petersburg together with the collections of the Załuski Library. Under the terms of the Treaty of Riga (1921), it was returned and placed in the National Library of Poland. In 1939, as a reaction to the beginning of World War II it was evacuated to Canada, from where it returned with other treasures in 1959. From May 2024, the manuscript is presented at the permanent exhibition in the Palace of the Commonwealth.

The manuscript is a combination of an evangelium and an evangelistary. The first part contains readings for the Mass in Biblical order, followed by Gospel readings arranged in the order of the liturgical year. The manuscript consists of 151 pages, measuring 15,5x10 cm. It contains three full-page miniatures with images of the Evangelists and initials with plant and animal motifs. A 2016 article noted that the manuscript contains musical notation (neumes) at folios 17v and 38r as well as litterae significativae in the passion narratives from Matthew and Luke. In older literature the manuscript, now described as an evangelistarium, was identified as a lectionary.

== Bibliography ==
- Makowski, Tomasz; Sapała, Patryk, eds. (2024). The Palace of the Commonwealth. Three times opened. Treasures from the National Library of Poland at the Palace of the Commonwealth. Warsaw: National Library of Poland.
- Tchórzewska-Kabata, Halina; Dąbrowski, Maciej, eds. (2003). More precious than gold. Treasures of the Polish National Library (electronic version) (PDF). Translated by Dorosz, Janina. Warsaw: National Library of Poland. ISBN 83-7009-402-3.
