= Skawinka′s Gradual =

Polish gradual from around 1460

- National Library of Poland
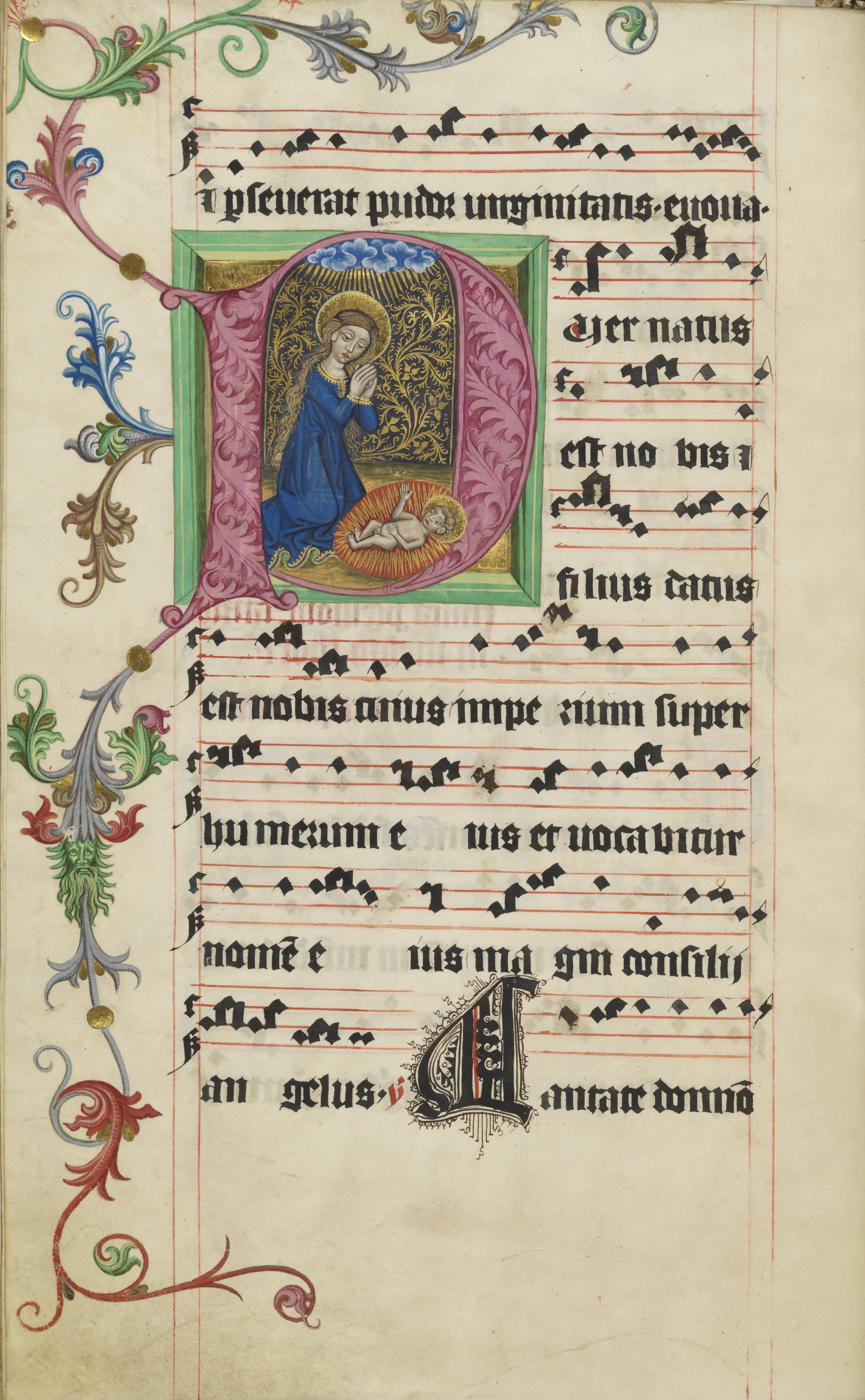
- Also known as: Graduale de tempore et de sanctis
- Type: codex, gradual
- Date: 14th century
- Place of origin: Benedictine Abbey in Tyniec
- Language(s): Latin
- Size: 56x38 cm, 344 lvs.
- Contents: chants for mass
- Accession: Rps 12721 V

Skawinka′s Gradual (Polish: Graduał Skawinki) is a richly illuminated gradual from around 1460.

The gradual was produced at the Benedictine Abbey in Tyniec in Poland on the initiative of Abbot Maciej of Skawina, known as “Skawinka”. The manuscript contains chants for mass for the entire liturgical year. The gradual is richly decorated The illuminations include the Annunciation, the Adoration of the Christ Child by angels, the Entry into Jerusalem, the Crucifixion, the Ascension, Pentecost, and St Jerome dressing the wounded lion’s paw. In the early 19th century the gradual was moved to the University Library in Lviv. The gradual came to the National Library of Poland after World War II.

== Bibliography ==
- Makowski, Tomasz; Sapała, Patryk, eds. (2024). The Palace of the Commonwealth. Three times opened. Treasures from the National Library of Poland at the Palace of the Commonwealth. Warsaw: National Library of Poland.
