= Flowery Triodion (Fiol) =

15th-century prayer book

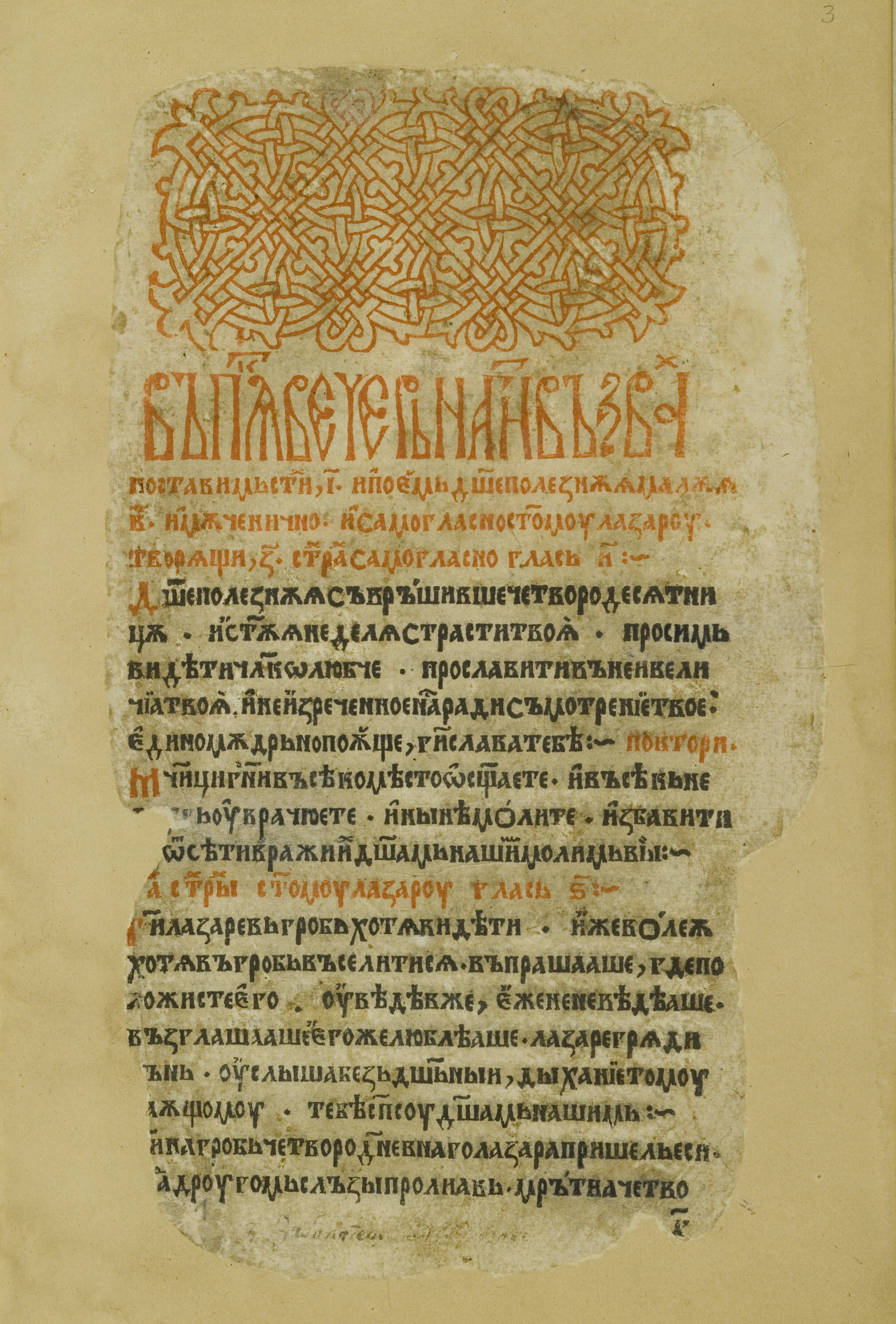
- Language: Old Church Slavonic
- Genre: Schweipolt Fiol
- Publisher: 366 leaves
- Publication date: before 1491
- Publication place: Poland

Flowery Triodion (Old Church Slavonic: Triod' cvetnaja) is one of the earliest surviving examples of a work in Old Church Slavonic printed in Cyrillic script.

The book was published in Kraków by Schweipolt Fiol some time prior to 1491. It contains prayers and the rite for the season of Easter in the Orthodox Church. After World War II it was moved to the National Library of Poland. This copy was kept in the Library of the Greek Catholic Chapter in Przemyśl. It is decorated with 62 woodcuts of southern Slav initials with teratological motifs. Triod’ cvetnaja has 366 leaves, measuring 31.5x21.5 cm, each having a 30-line column.

Only 33 copies of this edition have survived, excluding fragments. One of them from May 2024 is presented at a permanent exhibition in the Palace of the Commonwealth.

== Bibliography ==
- Makowski, Tomasz; Sapała, Patryk, eds. (2024). The Palace of the Commonwealth. Three times opened. Treasures from the National Library of Poland at the Palace of the Commonwealth. Warsaw: National Library of Poland.
- Tchórzewska-Kabata, Halina; Dąbrowski, Maciej, eds. (2003). More precious than gold. Treasures of the Polish National Library (electronic version) (PDF). Translated by Dorosz, Janina. Warsaw: National Library of Poland. ISBN 83-7009-402-3.
