= Jean du Pré =

French printer

Jean du Pré, born Jean Larcher (died 1504?) was a French printer in the late fifteenth century. Though based in Paris, Du Pré also travelled to print works in provincial towns like Chartres and Abbeville. His brother Étienne Larcher, who worked in Nantes, was also a printer.
