= List of libraries damaged during World War II =

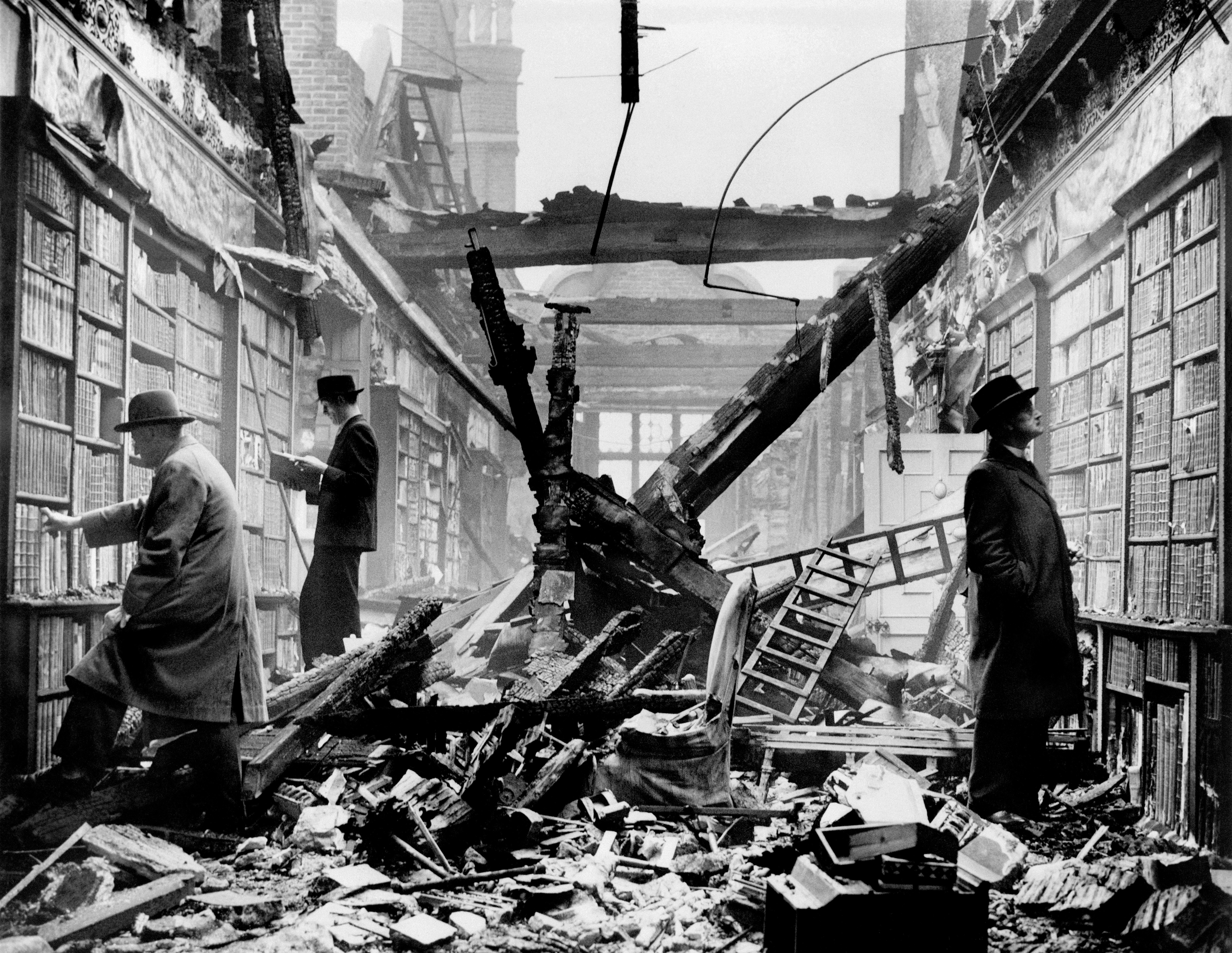
The bombed library at Holland House in 1940.

This is a list of libraries damaged during World War II. Libraries across Europe suffered heavy damage during World War II, with many buildings burned or bombed and millions of volumes lost. Entire collections disappeared through fire or looting: books, rare manuscripts, research archives, and everyday reading materials.

== Austria ==
When Hitler's Germany started the Anschluss with Austria in 1938, one of the first casualties was the looting of the public and private libraries of Vienna.

- Of the library of the University of Graz, about 100 manuscripts and 4,500 volumes of academic publications, which had been stored for safe keeping in Steiermark, were lost as a result of plunder.
- In 1938 the Nazis formed a Bücherverwertungsstelle which was a collection and distribution center for books stolen from the personal libraries, publishing companies and bookstores of Jews and other people whose possessions were declared in forfeit to the states for political or ethnic reasons. These books contained 644,000 volumes, of which 410,000 volumes were destroyed. This center was directed by Albert Paust, who previously had been the director of the Deutsche Bucherei in Leipzig. Libraries in Austria could choose desired titles from this center for their own book collections.
- "The two big Vienna Jewish libraries, the library of the Israelitische Kultusgemeinde (IKG) and of the Israelitisch-Theologische Lehranstalt (ITLA), were transferred separately to the Reichssicherheitshauptamt (RSHA) in Berlin, where a major part of them was burned in an air raid in 1943."
- "The library of the Weiner Arbeiterskammer (Council of the Trade Unions) had a very valuable collection of material in socialism, communism, trade unions and related fields, but when the Germans took over in 1938 they broke up the entire collection and moved most of the material to Germany. The rumor went around that collection was to form the nucleus for a library of an international labor office to be established under "the New Order". However, the collection disappeared altogether and has not been recovered yet. The library in Vienna opened its doors again in 1945 with its holdings reduced to a minimum."
- The National Library had been instrumental in of taking the books and other possessions of Jewish citizens, and also other victims of the Nazi regime. It was estimated that about 195,000 books and other objects had been stolen from politically and racially persecuted victims, and unlawfully added to the collection. In 2003 the Austrian National Library in Vienna stated that 32,937 books, manuscripts maps and other objects had been restored to their lawful owners.
- The Austrian National Library in Vienna had a number of books stolen from private libraries stored on site. After the war, these were returned without problems. These were the libraries of Moriz von Kuffner, Oskar Ladner, Viktor von Ephrussi, Stefan Auspitz, Rudolf Gutmann and Alphonse Rothschild.
- A review of the library situation in Austria at the end of the war was prompted by the American Library Association. "Vienna was heavily bombed and many of its famous buildings were badly damaged or altogether destroyed. But the library buildings were practically untouched. All functioned throughout the war, with only a short interruption when all facilities broke down in the Spring of 1945. But the conditions have suffered a great deal. There was at first a purge of books when the Nazis took over in 1938, and then all through the German occupation restrictions on new acquisitions and complete isolation from the rest of the world."

== Belarus ==
Two hundred libraries in Belarus suffered damage during the war. T. Roschina calculated that 83 per cent of the libraries' collection were plundered, stolen or destroyed. 600,000 of those volumes were subsequently found in Germany, Czechoslovakia, and Poland after the war, but a million other volumes, including rare and old printed volumes, have not been returned.

Belarusian libraries were plundered of 95% of their holding.

- In Smolensk, "...the German fascist invaders plundered and destroyed the most valuable collections in the museums. They desecrated and burned down ancient monuments; they destroyed schools and institutes, libraries, and sanatoriums. The report also mentions the fact that in April 1943, the Germans needed rubble to pave the roads. For this purpose, they blew up the intermediate school. The Germans burned down all the libraries of the city and 22 schools; 646,000 volumes perished in the library fires."

The "Smolensk holdings" of five hundred files of the Communist Party Archives ended up in the National Archives in Washington, DC, along with manuscripts of the Belarusian poet Vassily Koval. The papers of the Polish folklorist and ethnographer, Professor Józef Obrebski, ended up in the archives of the University of Massachusetts. The Khreptovitch Library was temporarily removed to Kyiv (Kiev) during the war. A Dutch Trophy collection was given to the Soviet Union and returned to the Netherlands. Part of the library collection of Petlura was returned to Ukraine.

- "The occupants looted the National Academy of Sciences of Belarus housing extremely rare collections of historic documents and books, and destroyed hundreds of schools, clubs, and theaters in Belorussia (White Russia). From the Pevlovsk Palace in the town of Slutzk the extremely valuable palace furniture, made by outstanding craftsmen of the 18th century, was removed to Germany."
- Many of the books returned to Belarus were found in Nazi storage areas in Silesia at the end of the war, but were mixed up with other books from different countries. Nevertheless, 54 railroad boxcars of books were sent by the Soviet Trophy Brigades (part of the Extraordinary State Commission) to Minsk. These boxcars carried 1.2 million volumes the Nazis plundered, including 500,000 books taken from French Jewish families and institutions. The books from France were stored in Silesia alongside hundreds of thousands of books stolen from Belarus, and this is why so many French books ended up in Minsk. "According to Nazi records, a squad descended on Professor [Victor] Basch's Paris apartment in January 1941 and took 17 cases of books. The professor had already left, and ended up in Lyon, where he and his wife were executed in 1944."

== Belgium ==
The Nazis assumed control over libraries and information. Concerning the confiscation of library books, one military order stated: "The Army groups and their designees may demand information from any person concerning economic data, supplies, consumption, storage, purchase and sale of goods, products and wares of every kind. They may demand books, papers, receipts, and samples be shown, and that anyone required to furnish information appear in person... Information shall be given free of charge."

- Brussels. The contents of the communist bookshop OBLA, Brussels, were sent by the Nazis to Racibórz, Poland.
- Brussels. The records of the International Federation for Housing and Town Planning were confiscated and brought to Germany.
- Jesuit convent in Enghien had 200 crates of books removed by the Reichsleiter Rosenberg Taskforce in 1941. Concerning this library and the École des Hautes Études mentioned below, the Germans said, "Both institutions were considered outposts of French culture on Flemish soil and unfriendly to Nazism." The archives and library of the international Jesuit college at Enghien, which was sent to the "Zentrale der anti-Deutschland speziell anti-National-Sozialistischen Information" ("Center for anti-German and anti-National Socialist Information")
- Ghent. École des Hautes Études in Ghent had 56 crates of books confiscated by the Reichsleiter Rosenberg Taskforce. The library of Niko Gunzburg (1882–1984) of history, law and Jewish culture, were confiscated by the ERR in January 1941, and shipped to Berlin in February 1941 in ten crates. Niko Gunzburg was a noted professor of law at the University of Ghent, was a leading member of the Jewish community, a prominent Mason, and he was also a protest-activist against National Socialism in Belgium. Of his large library, only 200 books were returned after the war."

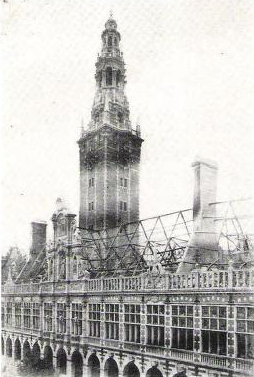
The burnt out remains of the Library of Louvain, circa 1940

- Liege. "Two remarkable photographic studies of the treatment of libraries by Germans shows what happened to the University of Liége in Belgium and the Polish Library in Paris. Books have been taken away- stolen, burned, dispersed- statuary lies in heaps of rubble on the floor, wainscoting and decorative woodwork have been pulled from their walls to be hacked to pieces, walls themselves have been destroyed."
- Louvain. Library of the University of Louvain (900,000 volumes, 800 manuscripts, all incunabula, and 200 prints of old masters lost; 300,000 books, manuscripts and incunabula were destroyed in World War I too) In May 1940, the stacks were completely burned down, as a result of German artillery fire. About 900,000 volumes, 800 manuscripts, all incunabula, and 200 prints of old masters were lost. After the end of World War I, Belgium libraries were re-stocked with books from collections in defeated Germany and donations from the government, private citizens and other institutions of the United States. However, it was believed the Germans attacked the library because of a Latin inscription that was proposed for the library balcony, but never placed on the balcony: "Furore Teutonico Diruta, Dono Americano Restituta" ("Destroyed by the fury of the Germans, restored by the generosity of the Americans").
- Public Library of Tournay (destroyed)

Some of the captured library loot was returned to Belgium by the US Government after the war. A photograph in the Offenbach Archival Depot records says in its caption, "1st cases of Belgium items being prepared for shipment. Inspected by Belgium Restitution officer, Lt. Raymond and Capt. Seymour Pomrenze."

== China ==
"According to the statistics of 1936 compiled by the Chinese Libraries Association, on the eve of the Japanese invasion there were 4,747 libraries in all throughout China, including independent libraries, school libraries, institutional libraries and county and municipal libraries. But by 1943, however, following the Japanese invasion and occupation, the number of libraries declined to 940. Four-fifths of the libraries were either destroyed or looted. Before the war, there were approximately 25 million volumes housed in the various libraries, but after the war the number was reduced to 15 million volumes. 10 million volumes, or forty percent of the books, were lost in the intervening years... Although some 158,873 volumes have been returned to China in the intervening years, it constitutes 6 percent of the total number taken, i.e., 2,742,108 volumes. The major portion has not been returned."

Many of the rare books looted by the Japanese from Chinese libraries were sold to collectors, according to Frederic D. Schultheis.

- National University of Hu-nan. Completely destroyed by bombs.
- National Library of China
- Nanjing Library
- Institute of Technology of He-pei, T'ien-chin. (Completely destroyed by bombs)
- Medical College of He-pei, Pao-ting. (Completely destroyed by bombs)
- University of Nanking. (10% of collections disappeared after 1939. Probably transferred to Japan, together with the card catalogue). Rare book experts from Japan carefully went over the collection of the university library, and each selected item was numbered, wrapped, and placed in a watertight case. Some 2,300 Chinese workers handled the packing under the supervision of some 400 Japanese soldiers. Over 300 trucks were need to take all the books, maps and manuscripts to Shanghai for shipment to Japan.
- University of Shang-hai. (27% of collections in Western languages disappeared after 1939, as well as 40% of collections of works in Chinese. Probably transferred to Japan. Many other books damaged by water)
- Royal Asiatic Society, Shang-hai. Collections transferred to Tokyo after 1939.
- Soochow University. More than 30% of the most important books disappeared during Japanese occupation 1937–1939.
- Tianjin. Nankai University "one-quarter of a million valuable books and manuscripts (some of them irreplaceable) were lost in the Japanese bombing of the Nankai University in Tianjin in 1937."

== Czechoslovakia ==
In 1935, there were 17,148 public, school and university libraries in Czechoslovakia, having a book stock of 8,528,744 volumes. Many of these items were confiscated by the Germans, especially any Czech books dealing with geography, biography or history. Works by any Czech writers were taken away, many burned, most others taken directly to the paper pulp mills. Special libraries were devastated, and suffered a loss of about 2,000,000 volumes.

"Czechoslovak Libraries after the Munich Pact... Soon afterwards all the Czech books dealing with geography, biography, and especially history disappeared... After being confiscated, many of these were burned, whole collections totally destroyed or taken away to Germany...."

Official notices of censorship and destruction of Czech nationalist and ethnic literature were given. A decree of the autumn of 1942 ordered all university libraries to hand over all early printed Czech works and first editions to the Germans. The collections in the National Museum were pillaged; and the Modern Art Gallery, containing a unique collection of Czech art of the 19th and 20th centuries with some precious specimens of foreign (mainly French) art, was closed. The entire political literature of the free republic, as well as the works of the participants in the Czech revival of the 18th and 19th centuries, were withdrawn. The books of Jewish authors were prohibited, as well as those of politically unreliable writers. The Germans withdrew the Czech classics, as well as the works of the 15th century reformer John Hus, of Alois Jirásek, the author of historical novels, the poet Victor Dyck, Karel Čapek, Vladislav Vančura and others. Thus the Hitlerites destroyed the national culture of the peoples of Czechoslovakia, plundered and pillaged works of art, literature, and science. It can be seen as gruesome precedence allowing communist regime, along with Soviet occupants post 1948 - 1968 respectively, to withhold parts of the seminal cultural heritage for generations.

- Prague National and University Library (25,000 lost books, mostly art books)
- During the war, over 700,000 volumes of the Charles University in Prague Library were stolen by the occupying German forces.
- Library of the Faculty of Natural Sciences (dispersed and destroyed, including the card catalogue)
- Ancient library of Jan Hodejovsky (seven codices)
- Dr Rousseau H. Flowers, assistant State Palaeontologist of the New York Museum, forwarded some correspondence from Dr. Ferdinand Prantl, of the Narodni Museum v Praze. Dr Prantl related how the National Museum was damaged at the same time as the capitulation of the German army, an act of sabotage and revenge. Although the famous Barrande collection was saved, the museum working rooms were destroyed, along with the books, journals and paleontological reprints.

Total losses of books, manuscripts and incunabula estimated at 2,000,000 volumes.

== France ==
- Municipal Library of Beauvais was destroyed by bombs in June 1940, with the loss of about 42,000 volumes.
- Both the University and the Municipal Libraries of Caen were destroyed by bombs in 1940.
- The Tours Municipal Library was hit by bombs in June 1940 and was completely destroyed except the most precious carolingians and medieval manuscripts, with the loss of 200,000 volumes, 400 incunabula and 400 manuscripts.
- The Chartres Library was hit by an American phosphor bomb that destroyed about 23,000 volumes, including most of the medieval manuscripts of the school of Chartres and incunabula.
- The Municipal Library of Dieppe was blown up in August 1944 by retreating German troops.
- The Douai Municipal Library lost 110,000 out of 115,000 volumes.
- The Library of the Société Commerciale in Le Havre was completely destroyed by bombs in an air raid. Geographical and travel books were lost.
- The Library of the National Assembly lost 40,000 volumes during the liberation of Paris in 1944 when German soldiers set fire to the Palais-Bourbon. Old printed works in the fields of theology, science and the arts were lost.
- The National and University Library in Strasbourg was partially destroyed by an air raid in September 1944. Literary periodicals and publications of learned societies were among the losses, as well as the greater part of the medical collection. About 300,000 out of 800,000 volumes were destroyed.

== Germany ==
- Library of the Technical University of Aachen (50,000 volumes lost, including journals, doctoral dissertations and illustrated works)
- National Library of Germany (2 million volumes lost)
- Library of Berlin University (20,000 volumes lost)
- Municipal Library of Berlin (damaged)
- Library of the Reichstag (almost utterly destroyed)
- Library of the German Army (damaged)
- Library of University of Bonn (a quarter of volumes lost)
- Library of Bremen (150,000 volumes lost)
- The Hessische Landesbibliothek (760,000 volumes lost, including 2,217 incunabula and 4,500 manuscripts)
- The Kassel State Library (the first German State Library bombed and destroyed, 350,000 volumes lost)
- Municipal and State Library of Dortmund (250,000 volumes lost)
- Sächsische Landesbibliothek (300,000 volumes lost)
- Municipal Library of Dresden (200,000 volumes lost)
- Library of the Verein für Erdkunde (12,000 volumes lost)
- Municipal Library of Essen (130,000 volumes lost)
- Municipal and University Library of Frankfurt (550,000 volumes, 440,000 doctoral dissertations and 750,000 patents lost)
- University Library of Giessen (90% volumes lost)
- University Library of Greifswald (17,000 volumes and 1,900 manuscripts lost)
- University and State Library of Hamburg (600,000 volumes lost)
- Commercial Library of Hamburg (174,000 volumes lost)
- Municipal Library of Hannover (125,000 volumes lost)

About a third of books in German libraries were lost.

== Greece ==
- Athens. "A large part of the University of Athens library is reported to be lost. The libraries of three American colleges were reported to have been used as fuel in the central heating system used by the Germans."
- The University of Athens contained over 400,000 volumes. Many of these volumes were looted or destroyed by the Germans.
- Salonica. The Einsatzstab Reichleiter Rosenberg agents sealed the yeshiva collections in which the city abounded. In April 1940, Dr. Johannes Pohl, chief of the Hebraica collection at the Frankfurt Institute's library, reviewed the rare books and other items of interest, and many of these books were shipped out to Germany.

== Hungary ==
The library of the University of Kecskemét had 45,000 volumes destroyed, and another 30,000 in the social sciences destroyed as well.

"1944–1945 Hungary: Nearly all small libraries (public, special) were destroyed and many of the larger libraries suffered serious damage during the siege of Budapest. The libraries of Parliament and of the Hungarian Academy of Sciences were among the libraries most severely hit; the library of the Polytechnic Institute was completely destroyed."

Russian soldiers confiscated books looted by the Germans, "...notably including those of the great Hungarian Jewish collectors..." and sent many of them back to Moscow, rather than leaving them in Hungary.

== Italy ==
Italian libraries suffered damage as a result of allied and German air raids. More than 20 Municipal libraries were destroyed and many public libraries suffered the same fate. It has been estimated that almost 2 million printed works and 39,000 manuscripts were destroyed.

- Public Library of Milan (200,000 volumes lost)
- Milan. "Sixteenth Century Maps Destroyed in War. It has been learned with much regret that the manuscript world chart of Vesconte de Maiollo Visconte Maggiolo, 1527, in the Ambrosiana Library and Art Gallery in Milan Biblioteca Ambrosiana, Italy, was lost through war damage."
- University Library of Naples (200,000 volumes lost)
- Naples. "On 26 September 1943, after encountering some minor resistance as they marched into Naples, German troops poured kerosene over the shelves of the university library and set it alight, destroying 50,000 books and manuscripts, many of them irreplaceable. Two days later, while the library was still burning, German soldiers discovered 80,000 more books and manuscripts from various archives deposited for safekeeping in Nola and set them alight, along with the contents of the Civic Museum, including forty-five paintings." "In Italy the University and Pontiana libraries in Naples, the National Library in Palermo, the Civic Library in Turin, have all disappeared in rubble. The archives of the city of Naples were burned by the Germans in reprisal; the Great Columbiaria in Florence was blown up by the Germans when they mined the approaches of the Ponte Vecchio."
- Naples. "During their retreat from Italy, the Germans burned irreplaceable archives, including the 850 cases of the Neopolitan State Archives."
- Naples. "...the Royal Society Library in Naples was burned after the shooting of a German soldier in an adjacent street..."
- Parma: Bibiloteca Palatina (suffered damage from an air raid)
- Rome: After the German occupations of Rome in 1943, Reichsleiter Rosenberg Taskforce (ERR) officers inspected the contents of the Roman Synagogue's two great libraries, the Collegio Rabbinico Italiano and Biblioteca della Comunità Israelitica, which contained extraordinary collections gathered over the 2,000 year history of Jewish life in Rome. They demanded the libraries' catalogs; just days before the first deportation of Roman Jews to Auschwitz, two specially ordered railcars destined for Rosenberg's institute in Frankfurt were loaded with ten thousand books from these libraries.
- Rome: Bibliotheca Hertziana – Max Planck Institute of Art History. Two archaeological libraries, the Hertziana Library of History and Art, and the German Archaeological Institute's library of the history, topography, art and customs of ancient Rome, were removed from Rome and taken to Germany by the Nazis. At the end of the war, the two library collections were discovered in two Austrian salt mines packed away in 1,985 wooden cases. The German Library's collection was unharmed, but some of the Hertziana collection and the card catalog were damaged by water when part of the mine flooded. They were returned to Rome, where they became part of the Gallery of Modern Art, where both collections will be in the care of the new International Union for the study of Archaeology, Art and History in Rome. One officer of the Monuments, Fine Arts and Archives program, afterwards wrote about his experiences in the Kammergrafen, the largest of the mine caverns and the most remote in the Alt Aussee, with the Biblioteca Hertziana. "The records listed six thousand pictures... and the books and manuscripts of the biblioteca Herziana [sic] in Rome- one of the greatest historical libraries in the world. Kammergrafen was quality and quantity combined, for here had been stored the collections for Linz."
- National Library of Turin (heavily damaged) Turin: The National Library was seriously damage by an air raid in December 1942.

About 2 million printed works and 39,000 manuscripts lost.

After the war, many of the major collections looted from Italy were identified by the Monuments, Fine Arts and Archives service of the American military government and returned to their owners. The Collegio Rabbinico Italiano, the Kunsthistorisches Institut in Florenz, and the Deutsche Historische Bibliothek Rom were all returned, although not all were intact, to their owners in Italy. "These last two collections were seized by Hitler with the idea of re-establishing them in Germany."

There is a photograph in the National Archives and Records Administration showing the unloading of some of these re-captured books. The caption reads: "The Kunsthistorisches Institut in Florenz, Library, is being unloaded at the Offenbach Archival Depot 9 July 1945. Three freight cars, 578 cases of books and catalogs of paintings, were brought from the Heilbronn salt mine in Württemburg-Baden where they were kept since brought from Italy."

== Japan ==
1942–1945 Japan: Air raids did heavy damage to libraries and collections, including the Cabinet Library of the Tokyo Imperial Palace in Tokyo.

The heaviest damage was sustained by governmental libraries. Over 655,000 volumes in the Tokyo area were destroyed, including those of the cabinet Library (46,695 volumes), the Ministry of Foreign Affairs (40,000 volumes), the Transportation Ministry (69,000 volumes), the Bureau of Patents and Standards (15,528 volumes) and the Finance Ministry (manuscripts and catalogs). The entire library of the Ministry of Agriculture and Fisheries was lost. Whether directly or indirectly related to the damages of war, total book resources in Japanese libraries were cut by 50%, and when the Occupation forces arrived in 1945 there were probably fewer than five million books in the country.

"In Japan, as in Germany, human and cultural destruction (including the loss of texts) were, of course, paired. Figures are hard to come by, but by the end of the war, bombing had accounted either directly or indirectly for the destruction of 50 percent of the total book resources in Japanese libraries. When the occupation troops arrived in 1945, there were probably fewer than five million books in the country. Three quarters of all public libraries suffered heavy damage, with 400,000 volumes in public library collections lost in a bombing raid on Tokyo alone. Heavy damage was sustained by government libraries; more than 655,000 volumes of the Tokyo area were burned, including libraries of the Cabinet, Bureau of Patents and Standards, and Finance Ministry."

Nearly three-fourths of all public libraries, a third of which were located in the Tokyo metropolitan area, suffered serious damage. Tokyo's largest, the Hibiya Public Library, sustained the greatest losses, estimated to be about half the entire 400,000 public library collections destroyed by bombing raids over Tokyo.

US firebombing of Tokyo in May 1945 destroyed many private Japanese libraries such as the 40,000 volumes in Hasegawa Nyozekan's house. The firebombing of Tokyo destroyed the majority of personal libraries there with many publications from before the war being permanently lost. Firebombing damaged Keio university in Tokyo.

The atomic bombings resulted in the vast majority of libraries in Hiroshima and Nagasaki being vaporized.

== Latvia ==
- 1940 Baltic states: After the occupation by Soviet troops an official list of Banned Books and Brochures was issued in Latvia in November 1940. With additional lists, over 4,000 titles were proscribed: historical, political and 'nationalist authors'. In Latvia as in Estonia and Lithuania such books were removed from bookstores and libraries and, in many cases, publicly burned.

Latvia was occupied by the Soviets from 1944 to 1991. What records remained after the defeat of the Germans were either removed to Russia or destroyed by intent or neglect. In Latvia, Holocaust scholarship could only be resumed once Soviet rule had ended. Much of the post-1991 work was devoted to identification of the victims. This was complicated by the passage of time and the loss of some records and the concealment of others by the NKVD and its successor agencies of the Soviet secret police.

== Lithuania ==
"Political upheavals have often created a frustrating situation for librarians and citizens in general. Consider the case of the Baltic states: Estonia, Latvia and Lithuania, which in 1918 had regained their independence after centuries of Russian occupation? As a result of the German-Soviet non-aggression pact of 1940, they were once more occupied by Russian troops and in 1940 bookstores and libraries were 'cleansed' and unwelcome titles were burned. In 1941 Nazi Germany conquered these countries, only to be driven out once more by the Soviet army in 1944–1945. These succeeding regimes brought not only an appalling waste of human lives, but also rapidly alternating prohibitions of books, purging of libraries and the rewriting of history and textbooks."

In Lituania, all universities and public libraries have been closed, and Gestapo agents removed or destroyed the equipment of the scientific institutions and books of the national libraries. The Academy of Arts was ransacked, and in Kaunas, the archives of the Academies of Science and Music were destroyed. Over 10,000 volumes were stolen from the State Library, and 23,000 more were stolen from the University Library. In part, this was in reprisal for the country's steadfast refusal to create a legion of Lithuanian volunteers to fight against the Russians.

In Vilna (Vilnius, Vilno, Wilno, etc) the ERR set up a collecting point for Lithuania. Dr. Gotthard of the Berlin headquarters arrived in August 1941, and began looting the Strashun Library. He conscripted the labor of two Gestapo prisoners, including A.Y. Goldschmidt, librarian of the Hispanic-Ethnographic Society. Eventually, he committed suicide rather than assist the looting of the libraries. Dr. Johannes Pohl appeared in January 1942, and ordered that the city be made a collecting point for the region, and concentrated at the Yidisher Visenshaftlikker Institut (Institute for Jewish Research). Materials were brought in from the private collections from Kovno, Shavle, Mariapol, Volozhn and other towns, and included books from over 300 synagogues and personal libraries. Some of the Jewish workers were able to smuggle out and hide some of the most valuable books in the ghetto, which was stopped when the ghetto was liquidated in July 1943. The accumulated collection of over 100,000 volumes were separated into piles by century of publication, and about 20,000 were selected for shipment to Germany. The remaining materials were pulped to avoid storage and transportation costs, and to make a small profit. One incident involved an assistant of Dr. Pohl dumping out five cases of rare books in order to make room for an illegal shipment of hogs.

"On 24 June 1941, the Nazis captured Vilna. In March 1942, representatives of the Einsatzstab Rosenberg (Rosenberg Operation Group), the body charged with looting Jewish cultural property for the Institut zur Erforschung der Judenfrage (Institute for the Study of the Jewish Question) in Frankfurt, established a sorting center in the YIVO building. Workers were forced to select the most valuable objects from the collections of YIVO and other local Jewish institutions to be sent to Frankfurt, while the remaining items would be destroyed... A group that was dubbed the "paper brigade" led by Avrom Sutzkever and Shmerke Kaczerginski, risked their lives daily by hiding material in the building's attic or smuggling it into the Vilna ghetto, where they buried it or gave it to non-Jewish contacts for safekeeping. Since it was located outside the ghetto, the YIVO headquarters also served as a transit point for smuggled weapons for the Jewish partisan movement. Such activity continued until the liquidation of the Vilna ghetto in September 1943. Some of the hiding places went undiscovered and the items stored there survived the war, but the YIVO headquarters and its contents were completely destroyed.

"He [Captain Seymour Pomrenze] was instrumental in the restitution of thousands of looted archives, including those of the Strashun Library in Vilna, Lithuania. The library was the premier Jewish library in Europe before World War II, and luckily survived the Nazi destruction of Vilna. The contents of the library, along with those of the YIVO building in Vilna, were looted for eventual placement in the anti-Semitic "Institute for the Study of the Jewish Question." Pomrenze oversaw the return of tens of thousands of items from the Strashun Library to the YIVO Institute for Jewish Research headquarters in New York."

"In 1954 a depot of 330,000 confiscated books was discovered in the building of a former bank in Vienna. This depot contained also books from Tanzenberg and there was found a part of the library of the famous YIVO in Vilna. With the help of an Austrian-Jewish lawyer called Friedrich Weihsenstein they were returned to the YIVO in New York. The librarian of the IKG wrote lists of the books, but none of the documents mention their numbers and the YIVO in New York was not very cooperative regarding the research."

== Luxembourg ==
In Luxembourg, all citizens engaged in "culture" had to register with the German government. This would help in the suppression of dissent, and enforce official censorship. In the "Duty of Registration for All Persons Engaged in Creating or Transmitting Cultural Values in Luxemburg (Verordnungsblatt, No. 15, February 21, 1941, page 109)", all writers, authors, publishers, art publishers, copyists and book dealers had to register. Those who refused to register with the occupation government, would be forbidden to practice their arts in the future.

"In Luxembourg, non-German reference materials, i.e., French or English were confiscated and replaced by German encyclopaedias. In fact, after 1940, there was an attempt to eliminate all English and French books from collections in the Netherlands, Belgium and Luxembourg. It was an attempt to seal off occupied countries from the intellectual currents of democracy."

== Malayan Union/Malaysia ==
"...the Japanese looted very thoroughly the head office at Batu Gajah: they removed all the scientific equipment and took away or broke about 5,000 rock slices. Fortunately the rock and mineral collections and the library and records did not fare so badly: eventually they tried to burn down the building, but this was prevented by the Asiatic staff. The district office also suffered badly. A serious loss was the disappearance of a memoir and map ready for publication, as well as all the relevant notes, so a good deal of the country will have to be re-mapped."

The Penang Library had its main collection in English, but also had some materials in indigenous languages. When the Japanese Army entered the city, they looted the library, yet they left behind enough materials for the library to continue operations. After the takeover, the library continued to have over 1,000 subscribers and remained open for their patrons until June 1944.

== Malta ==
The Malta Royal Library building was slightly damaged by aerial bombardment during the siege of Malta but no books were lost.

The building which housed the Notarial Archives received two direct hits from aerial bombardment in April 1942, and about 2,000 volumes of notarial records were destroyed or damaged. Some documents were later stored in the basement of Auberge d'Italie, where many were also damaged.

== Netherlands ==
- "July 27 (Netherlands News Agency) The German authorities have closed the famous Royal Library at the Hague and have begun transferring its books to Germany, it was learned today. When the Nazis occupied the Netherlands they renamed it "The National Library."
- Provincial Library of Zeeland (160,000 volumes lost). "1940 The Netherlands, Middelburg: The Provincial Library of Zeeland was destroyed in May after German bombs hit the town; a valuable scholarly collection of about 160,000 volumes was completely destroyed, while the remainder was seriously damaged by water or fire.

"...the library of the Spinoza House, the Dutch Scientific Humanitarian Commission, the International Archives of the Women's Movement, the Portuguese-Israelitic Seminary Ets Haim, the Beth Hamidrash Library, the library of the Nederlandsch-Israelitic Seminary, the Valkenburg Monastery Library the Dutch Economic and Historical Archives fell into the occupier's hands. In October and November 1943 it was the turn of the Amsterdam Ashkenazi archive and of several smaller Jewish archives in the provinces. The high point was of course the famous library of about 160,000 volumes of the International Institute for Social History (IISG) in Amsterdam, which was confiscated within two months of the invasion."

"The Einsatzstab Reichleiter Rosenberg (ERR), established by Alfred Rosenberg in 1939, was represented in the Netherlands by an Amsterdam office. In 1940, the ERR confiscated all property belonging to the Freemasons, among which was the famous Biblioteca Klossiana. This library had been bought by Prince Hendrik (1876–1934), husband of Queen Wilhelmina, and had been presented by him to the order of Freemasons. It contained important incunabula and books on the occult, which were not available anywhere else in the Netherlands. Other parts of the library and the order's archive were of importance as well. The library of the International Institute for Social History in Amsterdam was closed, and the ERR took over the building for its offices. In July 1940 the institute's very important collection of newspapers and the library of approximately 160,000 volumes were confiscated. German arguments over their final destination kept the materials in Amsterdam until the winter of 1944, when they were transported to Germany in eleven ships. The International Archives of the Women's Movement, established in Amsterdam in 1935, lost its whole collection after the institute was closed by the Sicherheitspolizei (Security Police) in June 1940. In August 1942, 499 crates containing books and archives taken from, among others, Jewish antiquarian book dealers and theosophical societies were transported to Berlin."

"In Holland [sic] the monks of the Abbey van Berne distributed the early printed books on the monastic library among neighboring farmhouses. Virtually all were destroyed by natural causes, by theft, and by shellfire. The Abbey buildings are intact."

"Sigmund Seeligmann (1873–1940) was a renowned Dutch bibliographer and historian. He often invited scholars to use his extensive private library, which included more than 18,000 books on Jewish subjects and was considered one of the most important Jewish libraries in Europe before World War II. After the invasion of the Netherlands, the Nazis confiscated Seeligmann's library in October 1941. His collection was sent to Berlin, where it became part of the Reichssicherheitshauptamt Library. In 1945, Seeligmann's library was discovered in Czechoslovakia. At the time, Nazi-looted Jewish cultural property was being uncovered in salt mines, bunkers, and castles across Europe. Often the recovered objects were the only surviving elements of the Jewish communities they once had served. Salvaging and preserving these cultural treasures became a high priority for Jewish organizations."

"The collections as well as the libraries of the International Institute for Social History at Amsterdam have been closed down. The library, which has about 150,000 volumes, as well as a very important collection of newspapers, has been taken to Germany. The Bibliotheca Rosenthaliana of the University of Amsterdam, which belongs to the city, has been packed in 153 crates and has also been taken to Germany. Famous collections concerning natural history of the College of St. Ignace at Valkenburg and the Museum of Natural History at Maastricht have also been taken to Germany, as well as the library which belonged to it. In 1940 all the property of the Freemasonry Lodges was confiscated and taken away to Germany. It included the well-known Klossiana Library."

The German authorities were especially interested in manuscripts of German and Dutch mysticism. Libraries and antiquarian bookstores were combed for special manuscripts of ancient lore. A special search by Dr. W. Grothe and F. Brethauer of the ERR was begun in August 1941. The Amsterdam, Utrecht, Leiden and Groningen university libraries were searched for manuscripts. Also combed were the Haarlem and Nijmegen municipal libraries, as well as the Fries Genootschap, the Meermanno-Westreenaianum in the Hague, the Nijmegen Municipal Museum and the Haarlem Bishop's Archive. Many manuscripts were taken and then later "exchanged" for manuscripts from German and Austrian libraries. If the manuscripts could not be exchanged or purchased, they were copied. The exchanges were sometimes advantageous for the Dutch, but the balance weighed in favor of the Germans, and many times were not unlike forced sales. Although with a legal appearance.

The German efficiency in selecting and removing these volumes from the occupied countries and sending them back to German is astounding. Also astounding is that many of the major collections remained more or less intact, and were recovered by the Allies at the end of the war. German libraries had preserved many of these Dutch collections as well as their own. As such, much of the Biblioteca Rosenthaliana, the library of the Jewish Portuguese Seminarium of Amsterdam, the books of the Societas Spinozana, the collections of the Freemasonic Groot Orde der Nederlanden, the volumes of the Etz Chaim Seminarium, and twenty Sifre Toroth (plural of Torah) were returned to their country from the Offenbach Archival Depot.

== Philippines ==
- Manila. "In the Philippine Islands, the Japanese carried off valuable scientific and other works and then burned nearly every collection within the nation. Almost all of the rich depositories of Filippina materials (books, manuscripts, maps) were burned. In 1945, Manila endured an orgy of murder and rape that killed about 100,000 civilians. By the war's end, Manila had also lost the National Library, the University of the Philippines Library, religious archives and many private holdings."

== Poland ==
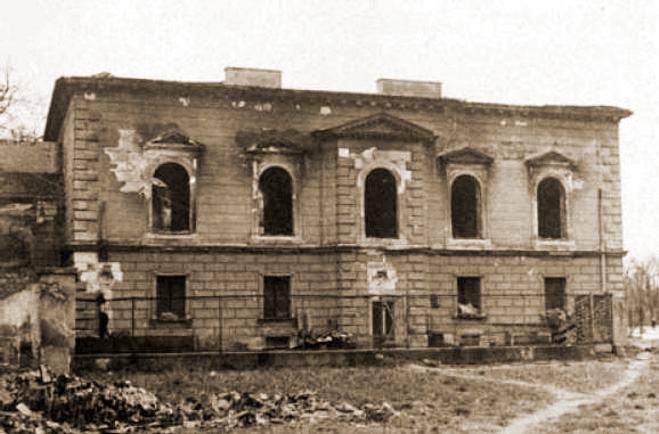
Destroyed Zamoyski Library in Warsaw (adjacent to the Blue Palace). Burned down in September, 1939 as a result of severe aerial bombardment by the Germans (incendiary bombing). The surviving collection was later deliberately burned by the Germans in September 1944.

Most of the Polish libraries were damaged and suffered losses by German occupation, especially prominent was the destruction of libraries in Warsaw.

Poland faced especially great losses, as the Germans continuously bombed Warsaw during the early stage of the war and focused at the beginning of occupation on "outright destruction of Jewish books and religious artifacts". What little did survive during the initial bombing and shelling was looted during the occupation and transported to Berlin, so the German's could study the "Jewish Question" (in the case of Jewish collections) or other subjects, such as the Polish military doctrine in the case of the Central Military Library, whose bulk of collection was seized and transported to Germany immediately following the conquest of Warsaw. The German occupation authorities later created "Brandkommandos" (arson squads) and "Sprengkommandos" (demolition squads), with their main focus being initially on burning or demolishing Jewish synagogues and their libraries; however, the Polish libraries in Warsaw eventually suffered the same fate during the planned destruction of Warsaw in the aftermath of crushing the Warsaw Uprising as earlier did the Jewish ones, while libraries in other cities (such as the Raczyński Library) were later systematically burned or demolished by the German troops retreating before the advancing Soviets and Poles, as a part of scorched earth policy.

When Polish librarians made a report to the International Federation of Librarians Association after the war, they stated that in 1939 there were 22,500,000 volumes in Polish libraries. By the end of the war a total of 15,000,000 of those had been burned, destroyed, or confiscated. This number is believed to be conservative, as it does not account for private collections which would have been destroyed or looted as Jewish families were deported.

- Cathedral Library in Poznań (burned)
- Central Military Library (initially looted, the remainder burned, 200,000 Books)
- Department of Land Forest (Burned, 100,000 volumes and 40,000 maps)
- Great Talmudic Library of the Jewish Theological Seminary in Lublin (burned, 24,000 volumes moved to Germany and also suffered losses in air raids there)
- Krasinski Library (Burned, 70,000 books)
- Library of Central Medical Training (Burned, 160,000 books)
- Library of the Great Synagogue (Burned, 25,000 books)
- Library of the Warsaw Medical Society (Burned, 60,000 books)
- National Library in Warsaw (Burned, 700,000 volumes lost including 500 manuscripts from the Rapperswill Collection)
- Przézdziecki Library (destroyed)
- Raczynski Library (destroyed)
- Rapperswil Library (damaged, it held 60,000 volumes)
- Library of the Warsaw Scientific Society (destroyed)
- Talmudic Academy (Burned, 24,000 volumes)
- the National Archives (About 4,700,000 volumes destroyed), including the invaluable historical documents held at the Central Archives of Historical Records
- Warsaw Public Library (partially burned, 300,000 volumes lost and 100,000 volumes looted)
- Warsaw University Library (Partially burned, Education Archives all destroyed accounting for over 40,000 volumes lost)
- Załuski Library (Burned, 60,000 books)
- Zamoyski Library (Burned, 100,000 books)

Around 15 million volumes were lost of a total 22.5 million volumes available.

== Serbia ==
In April 1941, the National Library of Serbia in Belgrade was completely burned and destroyed as a result of German bombs.

The official German document which refers to the bombing of Belgrade, presented in a postwar trial, says that the National Library of Serbia had been marked as one of the first targets of the Nazi bombing of Belgrade in 1941. In the first investigative statement given to the officers of the National Liberation Army of Yugoslavia in mid-May 1945 in Kupinec near Zagreb, German General Alexander Löhr said that Adolf Hitler personally ordered the complete destruction of Belgrade. Said Löhr:

The first wave was supposed to bring down the National Library, and only then all the rest that we found interesting in the military sense

When asked why National Library, he replied:

Because that institution has kept all that has represented the cultural identity of that nation for centuries, and we want Serbia to perish forevermore

The library fund on that April 6, 1941.

- About 1.300 historical Cyrillic Manuscripts from the twelfth to the eighteenth centuries (s. 12th~18th) were burned as well as important manuscript collections of Serbian authors and scholars.
- About 348.700 books were destroyed forever.
- The library also housed collections of Ottoman manuscripts, more than 200 old printed books dating from 15th to 17th centuries, old maps, engravings, works of arts and newspapers, including all the books printed in Serbia and neighbouring countries from 1832 on was destroyed.
- Incunabula and old printed works were also destroyed, as were Serbian books printed between 1832 and 1941.

== United Kingdom ==
England also lost her share of books destroyed during the war. Some 54,000 children's books went up in flames during the bombing of England, and thousands of special collections housed in the libraries are gone forever. Of the 1,145,500 books destroyed in the ruins of the bombed libraries, 982,000 were in city libraries; 155,813 belonged to university libraries, and the rest in county libraries.

- Channel Islands. Although the Germans were never able to actually invade England, the British Channel Islands were occupied, and many of their library books were also stolen by the ERR. After the war, some 3,740 books were shipped in 17 cases, and included "...books, Masonic documents and emblems looted from the British Channel Islands."
- London
  - On the night of 10 May 1941, the Luftwaffe lit up the skies over London, dropping a cluster of incendiary bombs that struck the old Iron Library of the British Museum. The southwest quadrant of the institution on Great Russell Street in Bloomsbury was destroyed, with a loss of 250,000 volumes, including a large number of American titles.
    - Additionally 30,000 volumes of newspapers in the Hendon Repository were lost
  - The Minet Public Library in London was hit by bombs in December and lost 20,000 books.
  - Lambeth Palace Great Hall received a direct hit from an incendiary bomb on 10 May 1941, destroying or badly damaging some 10,000 books.
  - During an aerial firebombing in 1940, at least six million books were destroyed in London's Paternoster Row area, the wholesale booksellers' district.
  - The Guildhall, which housed the ancient Corporation Library, was burned to the ground and 25,000 volumes, many of them unique, were lost.
  - About 7,000 volumes of King's College London were removed to Bristol and were lost when the Great Hall of Bristol University was hit by incendiary bombs.
  - The London law libraries of the Inner Temple and Middle Temple suffered losses as a result of air raids.
- Manchester
  - The Manchester Literary and Philosophical Society was formed in 1781, and, next to the Royal Society, is the oldest scientific society in England. Their beautiful home and library was destroyed by enemy action on 24 December 1940. The collections of eminent scientists were destroyed, including the John Dalton Collection, which was especially rich.
  - Manchester Central Library sustained minor damage from flying masonry when the Manchester Police Headquarters on Bootle Street was hit on the night of 1 June 1941.
- The City Library of Exeter was burnt to the ground during the Baedecker raids in May 1942; about a million books and documents were lost. The library had been used as control center by the firefighters during the attack.
- The University Library of Bristol was damaged by air raids, which destroyed the Library of the Department of Anatomy, with further damage to books by water and broken glass.
- The Central (Public) Library of Coventry was completely destroyed by German bombs; more than 100,000 volumes were lost.
- The Central Lending Library of Liverpool was destroyed.

== See also ==
- List of destroyed libraries
- Art theft and looting during World War II
- Planned destruction of Warsaw

== Bibliography ==
- Aalders, Gerard. Nazi Looting: The Plunder of Dutch Jewry During the Second World War. Oxford: Berg, 2004.
- Lost Memory — Libraries and Archives Destroyed in the Twentieth Century
- Posté, Leslie. 1948. "Books Go Home" Library Journal. December 1, 1948, page 1704.
- Žaček, Václav (April 1947). "Czechoslovak archives—war-time losses". The Slavonic and East European Review. 25 (65).
