= Rashash =

Rashash (רש"ש) is a Hebrew acronym that refers to either of the two following rabbis:

- Shalom Sharabi, Yemenite Halakhist and Kabbalist
- Samuel Strashun, Lithuanian Talmudist
