= Isaac Bencowitz =

Isaac Bencowitz (1896–1972) was a captain in the US Army's Monuments, Fine Arts, and Archives program after World War II.

== Early life ==
He was born in Unecha, Russia, and immigrated to the US as a child.

Bencowitz earned his Bachelor of Science from the University of Chicago in 1921. He also attended Columbia University where he earned his Master's degree in Chemistry in 1922, and his Ph.D. in 1924.

He then attended New York University on a fellowship and was an assistant at the Rockefeller Institute from 1927 until his retirement in 1961.

In 1927 he moved to Houston, Texas and began a thirty-four-year career with the Texas Gulf Sulfur Company.

He served and was wounded in both World War I and World War II, and received several Purple Heart medals in recognition of his service.

== Offenbach Archival Depot ==
Isaac Bencowitz began work at the Offenbach Archival Depot (also called the "Offenbach Collecting Point") as an intern in April 1946, after serving as an infantry officer in the U.S. Army from 1942 to 1945, where he received another Purple Heart for combat wounding. He quickly expressed interest in serving as the successor to Monuments officer Capt. Seymour Pomrenze, director of the Collecting Point from March to May 1946. Bencowitz was particularly qualified for this position, as he was fluent in Russian and familiar with several other Eastern European languages. Bencowitz's PhD in chemistry proved indispensable in the treatment of damaged books and documents. In addition to his formidable chemical and language skills, he was also skilled in industrial production, and was able to alter the methods in which the millions of books were handled to reduce production bottlenecks.

Bencowitz told Lt. Leslie I. Poste, another Monuments man,

I would walk into the loose document room to take a look at the things there and found it impossible to tear myself away from the fascinating piles of letters, folders, and little personal bundles. . . . There was something sad and mournful about these volumes . . . as if they were whispering a tale of yearning and hope long since obliterated.

"No sooner had Seymour Pomrenze started to make a dent in the Offenbach inventory than newly discovered materials poured into the depot; the paper tide continued through 1947 and 1948. "We had things pretty well organized by then," says Pomrenze. Yet even after some two million books and other items had been dispersed, about a million objects remained. Pomrenze's successor described how it felt to comb through the unclaimed material, such as personal letters and boxes of books. "There was something sad and mournful about these volumes, as if they were whispering a tale of...hope, since obliterated," wrote Capt. Isaac Bencowitz. "I would find myself straightening out these books and arranging them in the boxes with a personal sense of tenderness, as if they had belonged to someone dear to me."

Captain Bencowitz also helped loosen some bottlenecks in the way the books were handled at the Offenbach Archival Depot by using some of his engineering skills.

As director of the Offenbach Collecting Point from May to November 1946, Bencowitz developed an innovative system of identification and sorting in order to aid the restitution of artworks and cultural artifacts. The Bencowitz system of identification was based on photographic records of the ex libris – bookplates, stamps, and other markings – found in each book. The photographs were then indexed by country and sorters were assigned and responsible for three or four ex libris. Books and documents were sent down conveyor belts, and sorters removed those marked with their assigned ex libris, thereby organizing books by their places of origin. This system proved extremely valuable as it provided sorters who were not familiar with many of the eastern European languages an easy way to identify items. Books were documented in at least thirty-five different languages and over half of the 4,000 ex libris markings were of eastern European origin. The charge of sorting through the thousands of documents and cultural artifacts left behind after the mass genocide of European Jews proved to be emotionally taxing as well as technically difficult.

Across the Main River in Offenbach, the Central Collecting Point for Judaica has opened its doors. Mournfully, in row upon row, it displayed objects of every-day Jewish life, religion and culture pilfered from East European shtetl, impounded from Dutch and Belgium museums, confiscated from French or German Jews. In its cabinets bolted with iron bars there were letters, pictures, Torah scrolls, embroidered ark curtains, brass and silver menorahs, Passover plates, and precious books and manuscripts. For Captain Isaac Bencowitz, a Rockefeller Institute chemistry professor, and director of the Central Collecting Point, and for his staff, the daily work of sorting, cataloging, and finding the owners of these objects was a poignant mission. Between March 1946 and April 1949 the Offenbach Archival Depot succeeded in returning to survivors, descendants and museums over three million looted items.

== Post War activities ==
Bencowitz left Europe on leave in the fall of 1946 and was succeeded as director of the Offenbach Collecting Point by Monuments officer Theodore Heinrich. Written on an archival photograph of Bencowitz taken upon his departure is the following statement: "During his tour of duty, in the wake of the 3rd army he buried thousands of dead horses, provided food, shelter, clothes, etc. for French Belgians, Luxembourgers, Germans, and thousands of DPs. He supervised almost every function . . . . Yet, he finds, that the last seven months with the OAD [Offenbach Archival Depot] were the most engrossing and of more lasting significance."

Bencowitz was a member of the American Chemical Society, the American Institute of Chemical Engineers and the New York Academy of Sciences.

== Publications ==
- Bencowitz, Isaac. 1923. Compound formation, specific conductivity, and ionization in fused salt mixtures. Thesis (PH. D.)--Columbia university, 1924. 29 p. illus., diagrs. 23 cm.
- Bencowitz, Isaac. 1928. "A Simple Method for measuring Rotatory Dispersion." Journal of Physical Chemistry, v32 n8 (19280801): 1163-1170. DOI: 10.1021/j150290a003.
- Bencowitz, Isaac. 1941. "Sulfur-Asphalt Dispersions". Industrial & Engineering Chemistry. 33, no. 9: 1165-1168.
- Bencowitz, Isaac. 1925. "Vapor Pressure Lowering as a Function of the Degree of Saturation. I." Journal of Physical Chemistry, v29 n11 (19251101): 1432-1452. DOI: 10.1021/j150257a011.
- Bencowitz, Isaac. 1925. "Vapor Pressure Lowering as a Function of the Degree of Saturation. II." Journal of Physical Chemistry, v30 n5 (19260501): 643-657. DOI: 10.1021/j150263a006.
- Bencowitz, Isaac. 1938. "CASTING SULPHUR PIPE". Industrial & Engineering Chemistry. 30, no. 7: 759-764.
- Bencowitz, Isaac, and Henry T. Hotchkiss. 1924. "A Constant-Level Device for a Thermostatic Bath". Industrial & Engineering Chemistry. 16, no. 11: 1193-1193.
- Bencowitz, Isaac, and H. T. Hotchkiss. 1925. "The Preparation of Conductivity Water". Journal of Physical Chemistry. 29, no. 6: 705-712.
- Isaac Bencowitz and R. R. Renshaw. 1926. "THE BASIS FOR THE PHYSIOLOGICAL ACTIVITY OF CERTAIN -ONIUM COMPOUNDS. V. THE MOBILITIES . OF THE -ONIUM IONS. II." Journal of the American Chemical Society 1926 48 (8), 2146-2155. DOI: 10.1021/ja01419a020
- Isaac Bencowitz, R. R. Renshaw. 1925. "THE BASIS FOR THE PHYSIOLOGICAL ACTIVITY OF CERTAIN -ONIUM COMPOUNDS. THE MOBILITIES OF THE -ONIUM IONS. I. SULFONIUM IONS." J. Am. Chem. Soc., 1925, 47 (7), pp 1904–1916. DOI: 10.1021/ja01684a018.

== Bibliography ==
- United States Holocaust Museum
- Poole, Robert M. 2008. "Monumental Mission: Assigned to Find Art Looted by the Nazis, Western Allied Forces Faced an Incredible Challenge." Smithsonian Magazine. February 2008.
- Monuments Men Monuments Men Foundation. Includes a photograph portrait.
- "Bencowitz, Dr. Isaac". 1933. American Men of Science: a Biographical Directory. Page 81.
- Opritsa D. Popa. 2003. Bibliophiles and Bibliothieves: The Search for the Hildebrandslied and the Willehalm Codex. Walter de Gruyter Press. ISBN 3110177307; ISBN 9783110177305. 265 pages.
