= Seymour Pomrenze =

Jewish-American archivist and records manager

Seymour J. Pomrenze
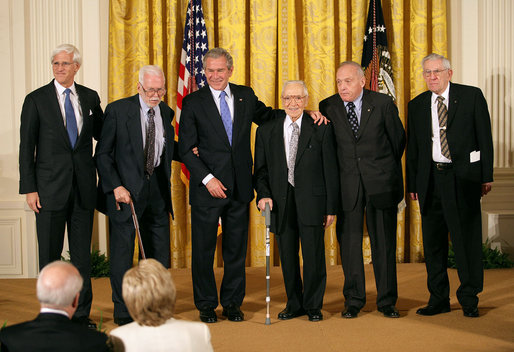
- President George W. Bush presents the National Humanities Medal to the Monuments Men Foundation for the Preservation of Art. From left, Robert Edsel and World War II veterans Jim Reeds, Seymour Pomrenze, Harry L. Ettlinger, and Horace Apgar (2007).
- Born: Sholom Jacob Pomrenze; September 1, 1915; Brusilov, Ukraine
- Died: August 25, 2011 (aged 95); New York City, U.S.
- Other name: Seymour Pomrenze
- Occupations: Archivist and records manager

Seymour Pomrenze (September 1, 1915 – August 25, 2011) was a Jewish-American archivist and records manager. He was the first director of the Offenbach Archival Depot, the primary Allied collection point for books and archival material looted by the Nazis.

== Early life ==
Sholom (Seymour) Jacob Pomrenze was born in Brusilov, Ukraine. In 1922, his family immigrated to Chicago. Pomrenze grew up in a heavily Jewish area, attended a Hasidic synagogue, and went to both secular and Hebrew schools. In 1939, while in college, he took job at the National Archives and Records Administration. Pomrenze joined the United States Army in April 1942, and was commissioned a second lieutenant in April 1943.

Pomrenze attended and held degrees from the Illinois Institute of Technology, the University of Chicago, and the Spertus College of Jewish Studies.

== Offenbach Archival Depot ==
In December 1945, Koppel Pinson, the Joint Distribution Committee's representative in Germany, recommended that Pomrenze be the first head of the Offenbach Archival Depot (OAD). The OAD, part of the US Army's Monuments, Fine Arts, and Archives program, was the central collection point for books and archival materials looted from Europe by the Reichsleiter Rosenberg Taskforce. Lieutenant Leslie I. Poste of the Monuments, Fine Arts, and Archives program also recommended Pomeranze for the job, as did Judge Simon H. Rifkind, advisor on Jewish Affairs to General Dwight Eisenhower.

From February to May 1946, Pomrenze organized the depot's procedures and began working on returning books and religious artifacts. Among the items handled by the OAD were the Library Rosenthaliana, the YIVO collection, and the Strashun Library of Vilna, Lithuania. The latter was the premier Jewish library in Europe before World War II, and luckily survived the Nazi destruction of Vilna.

Captain Isaac Bencowitz became the director of the Offenbach Archival Depot after Pomrenze left for home.

== Records management ==
After his discharge from the Army, Pomrenze returned to Washington, DC. He worked for NARA (1947-1949) and as a civilian for the Army (1950-1977). Among his duties in the Adjutant General's office of the U.S. Army was the administration of and restitution to West Germany of German records captured during World War II. In 1968, Pomrenze assembled a collection of information about these records, based on his work in the 1950s.

Late in his military career, Pomrenze returned to active duty to perform records training in Vietnam in 1970-1971. Upon his retirement, he was a colonel and Archivist of the Army. Pomrenze was also a records management consultant, primarily to Jewish organizations. He worked with dozens of organizations, such as the Hebrew Immigrant Aid Society, the National Jewish Welfare Board, and the UJA-Federation of New York. He also taught records management at American University, and published articles about records and archives management.

== Awards ==
Col. Pomrenze received many awards and decorations, including the World War II Victory Medal, a Bronze Star medal for his service in Vietnam, the Legion of Merit, Asiatic-Pacific Campaign Medal with three bronze stars, as well as the Netherlands Government Silver Medal of Honor for his work with the Monuments, Fine Arts, and Archives program.

== Bibliography ==
- Pomrenze, Seymour. The records of the Offenbach Collecting Point for books and library collections are in the Ardelia Hall Collection, Boxes 250-262, OMGUS, Record Group 260, National Archives at College Park, MD. Offenbach Collecting Point reports are in the Monthly Consolidated Field Reports in the Records of the Wiesbaden Central Collecting Point in the Ardelia Hall Collection, Boxes 136- 139, OMGUS, Record Group 260, National Archives at College Park, MD.
- "Seymour J. Pomrenze: Offenbach Reminicences and the Restitution to the Netherlands." In: The Return of Looted Collections (1946-1996). An Unfinished Chapter. Amsterdam. 1997, pages 10–18.
- Waite, Robert G. 2002. "Returning Jewish Cultural Property: The Handling of Books Looted by the Nazis in the American Zone of Occupation, 1945 to 1952." Libraries & Culture - Volume 37, Number 3, Summer 2002, pp. 213–228.
- Professor Zvi Gitelman; Ms. Laura Meislin; Colonel Seymour Pomrenze; Dr. Jaclc Ukeles. 1999. "Toward An Inventory of Jewish Cultural Assets in the Former Soviet Union (FSU) and Eastern Europe: Key Contacts." Submitted to: The Memorial Foundation for Jewish Culture. Prepared by: Ukeles Associates, Inc.
- Farmer, Walter Ings. 2000. The Safekeepers: A Memoir of Arts at the End of World War II. Walter de Gruyter. ISBN 9783110168976.
- Pomrenze, Seymour J. 1998. "Personal Reminiscences of the Offenbach Archival Depot, 1946-1949. Fulfilling International and Moral Obligations."
