= Koppel Pinson =

American historian

- Born: Koppel Shub Pinson; February 11, 1904; Postawy, Russian Empire
- Died: 1961 (aged 56–57); New York, NY
- Occupation: Historian
- Known for: Helping Jewish survivors of the Holocaust in DP camps

Koppel Shub Pinson (1904–1961) was a historian who specialized in the origins of German nationalism.

== Early life ==
Born in Postawy, Russian Empire (now in Belarus), on February 11, 1904, Pinson immigrated to the United States with his family in 1907.

== Career ==
After receiving his doctorate in history from Columbia University in 1934, he was a professor at Queens College of the City University of New York City until his death. In 1955, he joined the American Committee for the Study of War Documents, a group of American historians that sought to have captured German records microfilmed before being returned to West Germany.

== World War Two ==
Even before World War Two, Pinson was active in assisting refugee scholars during the 1930s. At the end of the Second World War, he joined the U.S. Army and actively participated in the efforts to help Jewish survivors of the Holocaust living in Displaced persons camps across Germany, organized by the American Jewish Joint Distribution Committee and the United Nations Relief and Rehabilitation Administration (UNRRA). In 1945, he was appointed Director of Education and Culture for Jewish Displaced Persons in Germany and Austria by the Joint Distribution Committee, working as of late 1945 at the Offenbach Archival Depot.

== Works ==
- A bibliographical introduction to nationalism. New York, Columbia University Press, 1935.
- The Jewish spirit in Nazi Germany. Chicago, 1937.
- Poetry of Hassidism. New York : Menorah Journal, 1941.
- Essays on anti-Semitism. New York, Conference on Jewish relations, 1942.
- Arkady Kremer, Vladimir Medem, and the ideology of the Jewish "Bund." [New York, 1945]
- Jewish life in liberated Germany. New York : Conference on Jewish relations, 1947.
- The national theories of Simon Dubnow Conference on Jewish Relations, New York, 1948
- Nationalism in the Western World. Washington, Institute of Ethnic Studies, Georgetown University, 1959.
- Modern Germany: its history and civilization New York : Macmillan, 1966.
- Pietism as a factor in the rise of German nationalism. New York, Octagon s, 1968 [©1934]
