= Samuel Dickstein (mathematician) =

Polish mathematician (1851–1939)

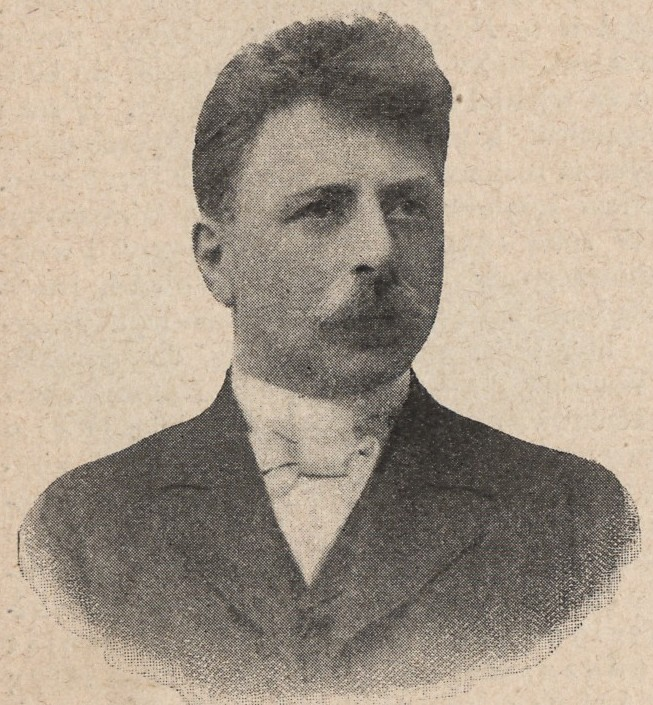
Samuel Dickstein

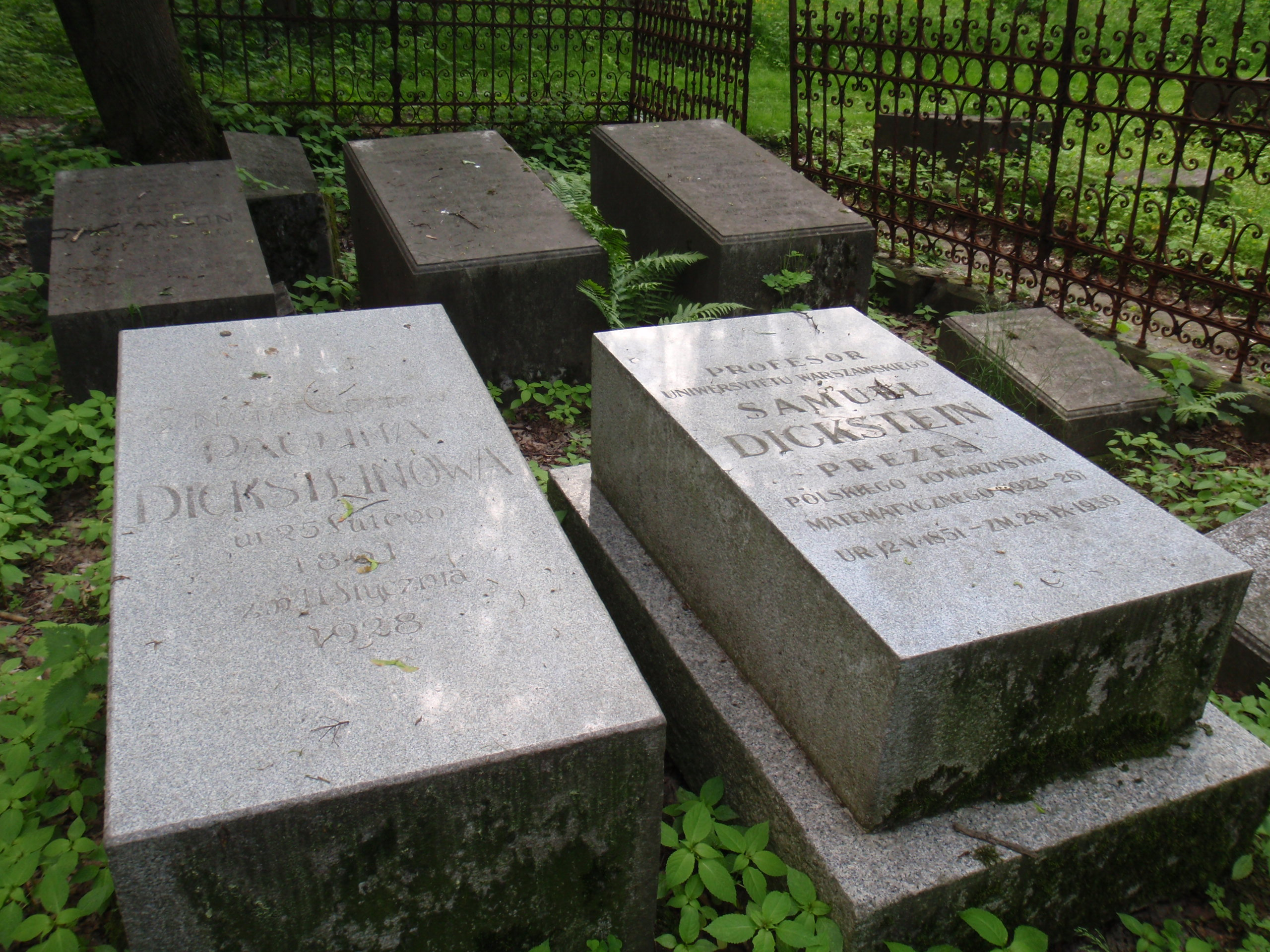
Grave of Samuel Dickstein at the Jewish cemetery in Warsaw

Samuel Dickstein (12 May 1851 – 28 September 1939) was a Polish mathematician of Jewish origin. He was one of the founders of the Jewish party Zjednoczenie ("the union"), which advocated the assimilation of Polish Jews.

== Biography ==
He was born in Warsaw and was killed there by a German bomb at the beginning of World War II. All the members of his family were murdered during the Holocaust.

== Work ==
Dickstein wrote many books on mathematics and founded the journal Wiadomości Mathematyczne (Mathematical News), now published by the Polish Mathematical Society. He was a bridge between the times of Cauchy and Poincaré and those of the Lwów School of Mathematics. He was also thanked by Alexander Macfarlane for contributing to the Bibliography of Quaternions (1904) published by the Quaternion Association.

He was also one of the personalities who contributed to the foundation of the Warsaw Public Library in 1907.
