= Warsaw Public Library – Central Library of the Masovian Voivodeship =

Library in Warsaw, Poland

- Biblioteka Publiczna m.st. Warszawy – Biblioteka Główna Województwa Mazowieckiego
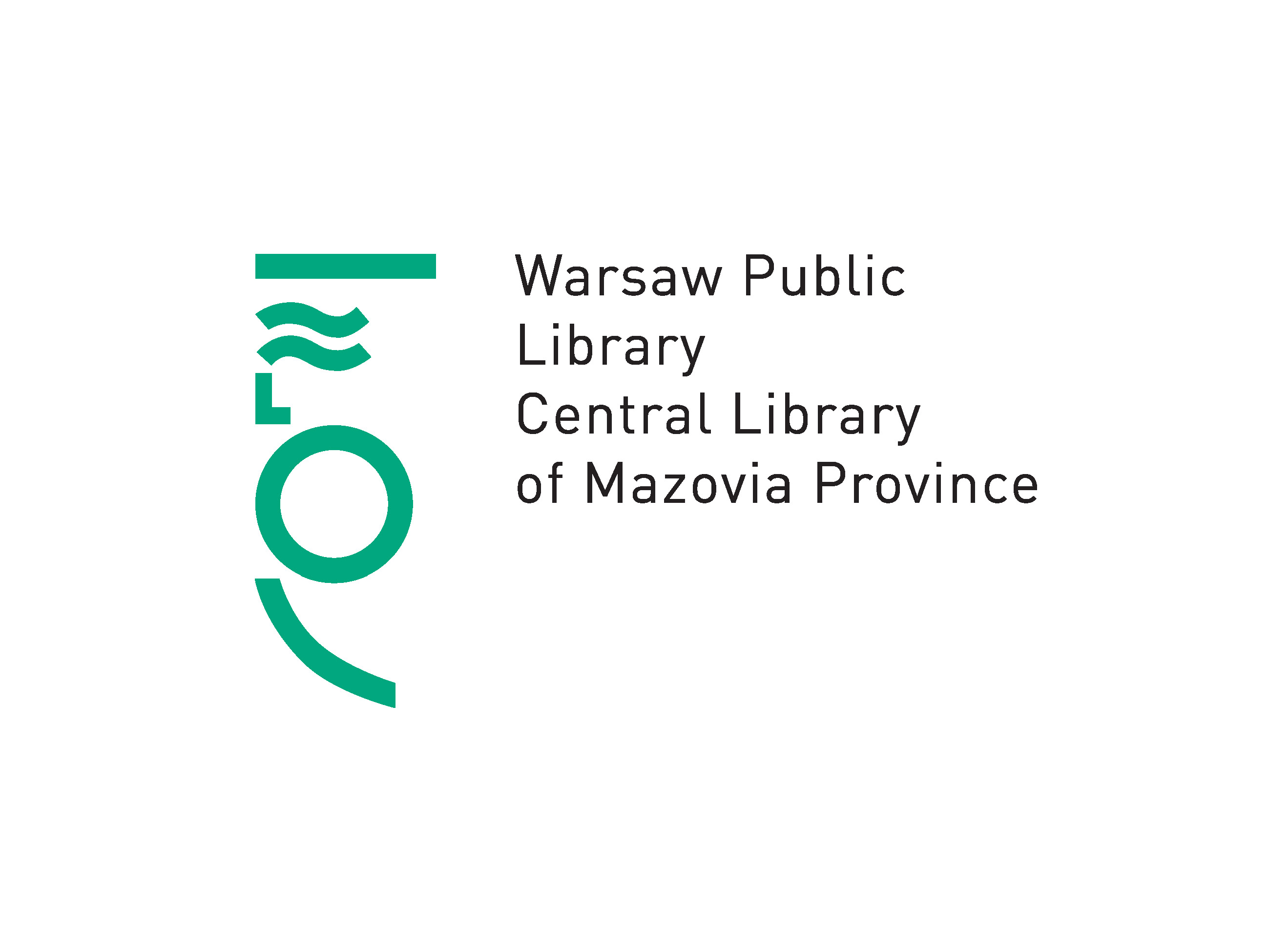

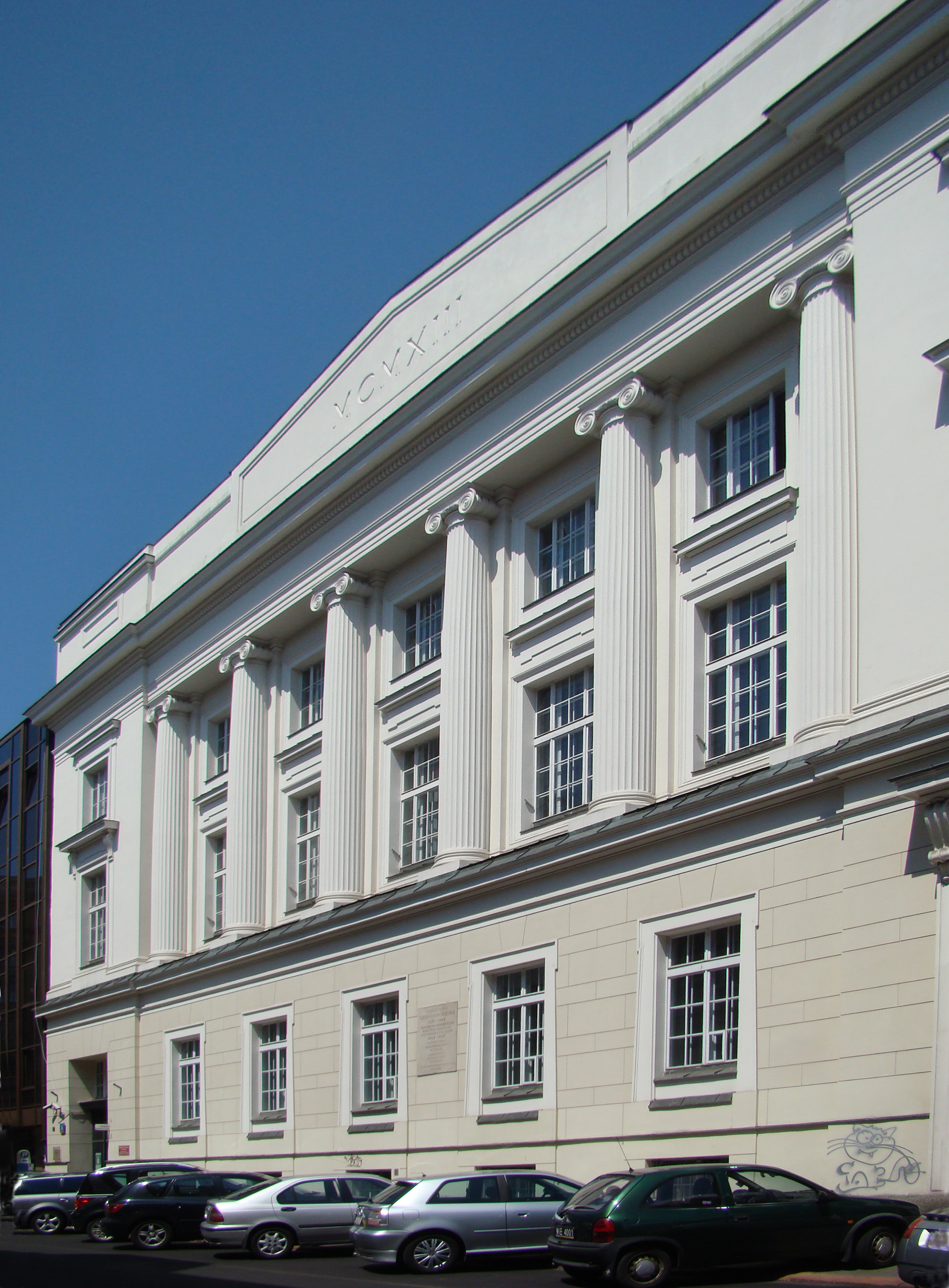
- 52.222307°N 21.01853°E
- Location: Warsaw, Poland
- Type: Public library
- Established: 1907; 119 years ago

Collection
- Size: 1 500 000

Other information
- Director: Michał Strąk
- Website: www.koszykowa.pl

Warsaw Public Library – Central Library of the Masovian Voivodeship (Polish: Biblioteka Publiczna m.st. Warszawy – Biblioteka Główna Województwa Mazowieckiego) is a public library serving as the main city public library of Warsaw, as well as of the Masovian Voivodeship, and one of the largest in Poland. It is known colloquially as Koszykowa Library (Polish: Biblioteka na Koszykowej) after Koszykowa Street on which it is located.

== History ==
The library was founded in 1907 by the Public Library Society, which was formed by foremost Polish educators and intelligentsia, such as Stanisław Leszczyński, Samuel Dickstein, Ludwik Krzywicki, Stefan Żeromski and Bronisława Kondratowicz. Since 1914, the library had been located on Koszykowa Street in a building originally designed by Jan Fryderyk Heurich. sponsored by the prominent Kierbedź family.

At that time the institution was led by Faustyn Czerwijowski, the first chairman of the library, who served in this position till 1937. Before the outbreak of World War II the library already contained 500,000 book volumes. In January 1945 it was set ablaze by retreating Nazi German soldiers. As a result, 300,000 books were destroyed, another 100,000 were looted. Koszykowa Library was reconstructed after the war and further extended during the 1950s and 1960s to create additional reading rooms in the adjoining buildings. It underwent a major renovation in 2015. As of 2021, the library contains around 1.5 million volumes.

== Gallery ==
Stanisławów Kierbedziów Reading Room in 2010 prior to renovation

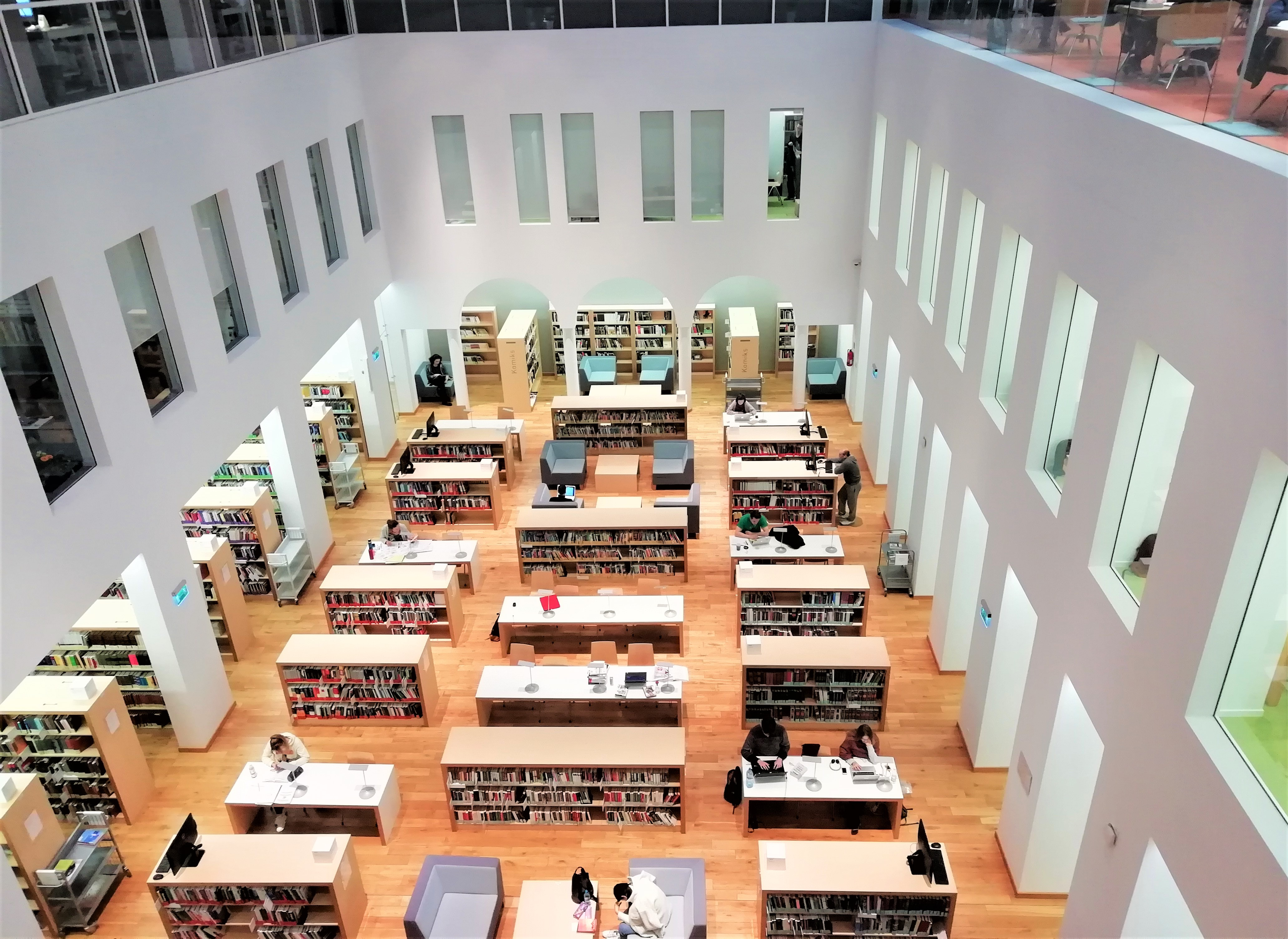
Faustyn Czerwijowski Reading Room following the 2015 renovation (photograph from 2020)

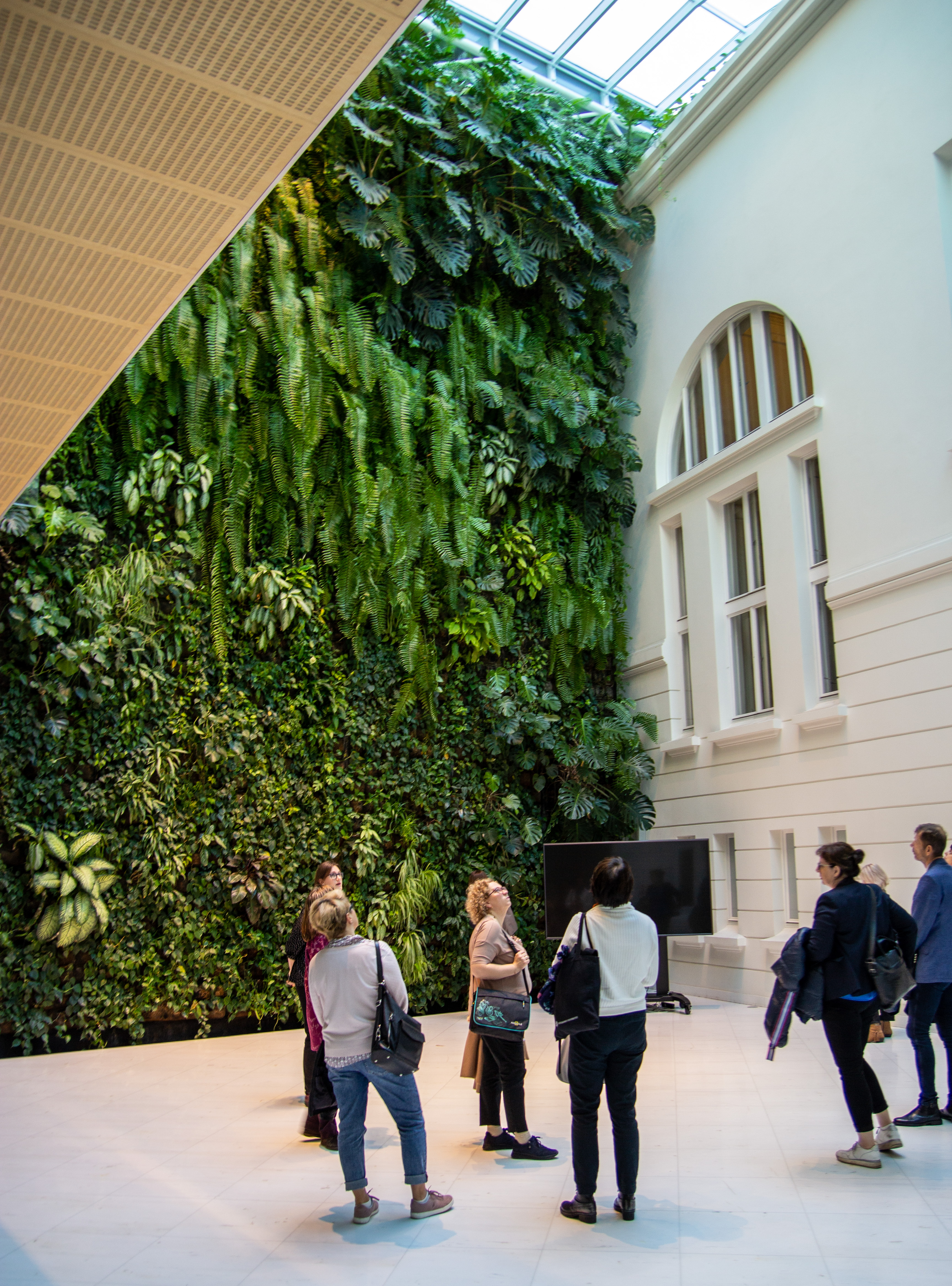
Building interior in 2022

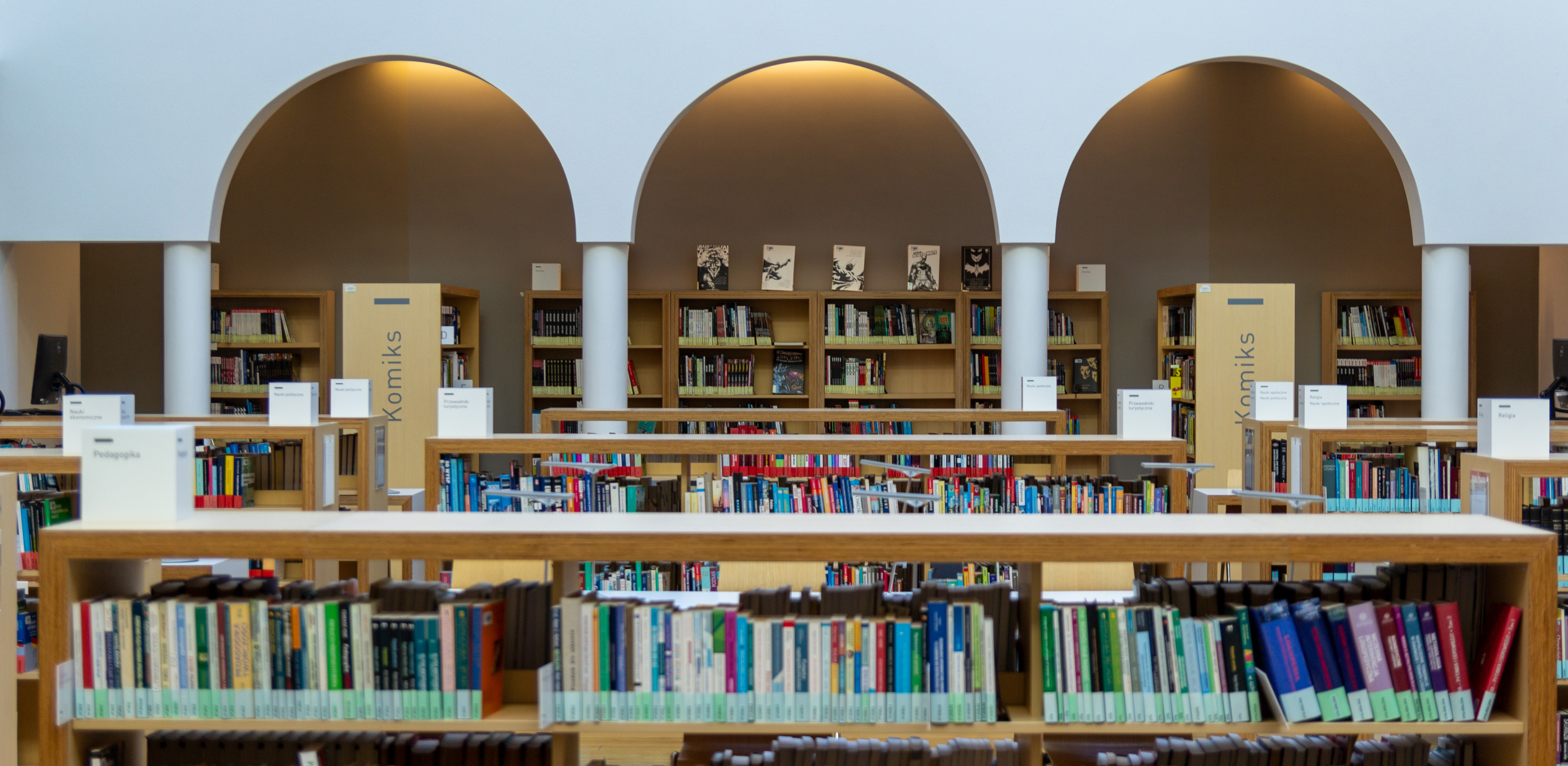
Faustyn Czerwijowski Reading Room with stacks in 2022

== See also ==
- List of libraries damaged during the World War II
- List of libraries in Poland
