= Samuel Strashun =

19th-century Lithuanian rabbi

- שמואל שטראשון
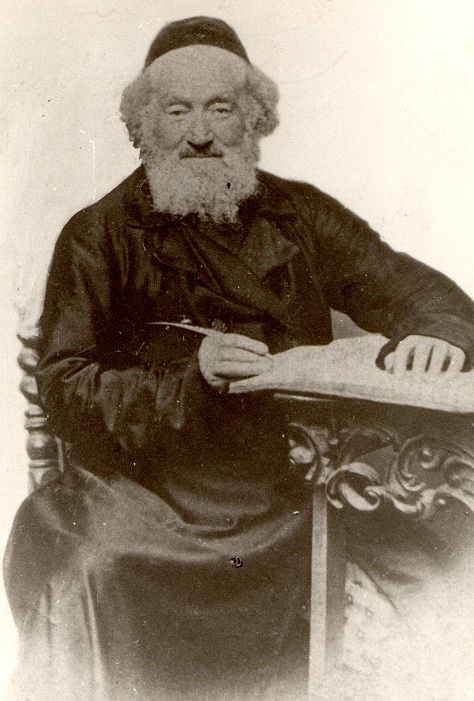

Personal life
- Born: 1794
- Died: March 21, 1872 (aged 77–78) Wilna
- Era: Acharonim

Religious life
- Religion: Judaism

Samuel ben Joseph Strashun (1794 – March 21, 1872) (Hebrew: שמואל שטראשון מוילנא), also known as Rashash (רש"ש), was a Russian Talmudist born in Zaskevich, government of Wilna. He was educated by his father, and later learnt under R. Shemariah Rabinowitz in Kreva, Belarus.

He married at an early age, and settled with his wife's parents in the village of Streszyn, commonly called Strashun (near Wilna), and assumed the latter name. The distillery owned by his father-in-law was wrecked by the invading French army in 1812, and the family removed to Wilna, where Samuel established another distillery and became one of the most prominent members of the community. His wife conducted the business, as was usual in Wilna, and he devoted the greater part of his time to studying the Talmud and to teaching, gratuitously, the disciples who gathered about him. The Talmud lectures which for many years he delivered daily at the synagogue on Poplaves street were well attended, and from the discussions held there resulted his annotations, which are now incorporated in every recent edition of the Babylonian Talmud (Hagahot v'Chiddushei HaRashash). His fame as a rabbinical scholar spread throughout Russia, and he conducted a correspondence with several well-known rabbis.

Strashun was offered the rabbinate of Suwałki, but he refused it, preferring to retain his independence. His piety did not prevent him from sympathizing with the progressive element in Russian Jewry, and he was one of the few Orthodox leaders who accepted in good faith the decree of the government that only graduates of the rabbinical schools of Wilna and Jitomir should be elected as rabbis. He wrote Hebrew well, spoke Polish fluently, was conspicuously kind and benevolent, and was highly esteemed even among the Christian inhabitants of Wilna. He was greatly respected for his many public activities and his devotion to the Jewish community. Also a wealthy man, he established and managed an interest-free loan fund for the people of Wilna.

Besides the above-mentioned annotations, he wrote others to the Midrash Rabbot, which first appeared in the Wilna editions of 1843-45 and 1855. Some of his novellæ, emendations, etc., were incorporated in the works of other authorities. He died in Wilna on March 21, 1872.

== See also ==
- Mattityahu Strashun, his son
