= Leslie I. Poste =

American librarian (1918–1996)

Leslie Irlyn Poste (1918–1996) was a US librarian in the Monuments, Fine Arts, and Archives program at the end of World War II and was active in the preservation, conservation, and restitution of books, scrolls, manuscripts, and reports accumulated by the German government from the occupied countries.

== Early life ==
Having studied at Wayne State University, Poste received his bachelor's degree in Library Science from Columbia University.

== Monuments, Fine Arts and Archives Program ==
Like so many Monuments, Fine Arts, and Archives program officers, Leslie Poste's military career began with his induction as a private soldier because his vision problems nixed his application to Officers' Candidate School. By 1943 he had just earned his Master's degree in Library Science and was serving as an acting librarian at Columbia College when the Army called him. With their usual placement skills they put Poste into a General Service Engineers Regiment like mine. His regiment landed in Bristol, England, and built the same sort of temporary encampments our regiment had constructed. During a cold and miserable winter, Poste was nearly buried alive when a ditch his unit was digging collapsed upon them. The accident sent him to a hospital near Oxford for thirty days, during which time he started a war-time library of paperback books. At the end of his stay the hospital wanted to keep him because he could type and spell medical terms. Still in need of physical therapy for a crushed knee he wanted to stay, but the army sent him back to his regiment. They needed typists too, but could not keep him for long. His librarian's training had finally been spotted and he became the first enlisted man to join the Library Branch of Special Services in London. From then on Poste rose through the Army's staff school programs which needed libraries for their instruction. After two and half years in the Army he won his commission as a first lieutenant in June 1945. Poste remained in England until he was sent to Heidelberg 15 October 1945 to become a MFA&A officer with the Seventh Army. On arriving, he was interviewed by my boss, Captain James Rorimer. Jim never failed to be impressive on first meeting and Poste was awed by his stories of MFA&A's preservation missions on behalf of looted art. On the other hand, virtually nothing had been done about looted libraries: "It's up to you," Rorimer said and then inquired if Poste could drive a car. He could not. The same afternoon he received a half hour's instruction. Thus prepared, Lt. Leslie Poste set out to rescue some of the finest libraries of Europe.

— The Safekeepers, 2000

== Offenbach Archival Depot ==
Poste was assigned to work at the Offenbach Archival Depot in 1945. His job was to scour the countryside for locations of books stored by the Germans in remote locations to avoid destruction by Allied bombing. The original collecting point in 1945 was the Rothschild Library in Frankfurt, but the overwhelming numbers required them to find a new location in the IG Farben Building in Offenbach. This five-story building was soon renamed the Offenbach Archival Depot. General Eisenhower issued an order in September 1945 that all trained librarians who were officers in the Western Theatre of Operations were to report to him for possible duty in the MFA&A. Poste was selected from the other librarians for this duty, and ended up driving over 1,600 kilometres (1,000 mi) a week in an open jeep around Hesse and Württemberg-Baden, who helped select and set up the Collecting Point at Offenbach. Cataloging was streamlined under Poste, and some 300 books a day eventually increased to where millions of books could be returned to their libraries.

Robert M. Edsel writes:

As one of the founders of the Offenbach Archival Depot (or Collecting Point), he was an instrumental figure in the restitution of books and archives in Europe following World War II. Before the Offenbach collecting point was established, library collections from Hungen, Bavaria, Hirzenhain and other repositories were stored at the Rothschild Library in Frankfurt for sorting and cataloguing. Poste recognized that the system in use at the Rothschild Library was inefficient, and suggested the relocation of operations to the I.G. Farben building in Offenbach. By establishing the Offenbach Archival Depot, all of the collections found in repositories were restituted through a single, large, and secure facility.

— Monuments Men

Seymour J. Pomrenze said:

In late February 1946, my colleague First Lieutenant Leslie I. Poste, a Library and Archives specialist, drove me through a blinding snowstorm to Offenbach. En route, Lt. Poste briefed me on the Offenbach Collection Point's origins, his role in selecting a building within the I.G. Farben complex on the Main River, and his concern that restitution operations be expedited in accordance with military regulations. Since its establishment in July 1945, the operation had yet to restitute any materials. Lt. Poste also reviewed the operations of Hitler's Einsatzstab Reichsleiter Rosenberg (ERR) and its educational branch the Institut zur Erforschung der Judenfrage ('Institute for Study of the Jewish Question'). The ERR, backed by German military forces, had traced Jewish, Masonic, Socialist, and other anti-Nazi cultural objects throughout Germany and Nazi-occupied Europe and had deposited them in many places, especially in Frankfurt am Main in the Rothschild Library, Hungen and Hirzenhain in Hesse, and all over Bavaria. The ERR targets ranged from occupied Ukraine to the French-Spanish border and from Greece to the British Isle of Man. The ERR even raided Italy, an axis power. After Kristallnacht, the ERR collected items to save and use them for Nazism. Lt. Poste also described the U.S. combat and occupation operations to protect and restitute the looted collections. He and other Museums Fine Arts and Archives personnel felt the collections at the Rothschild Library and other places should be moved to a single large, secure facility. The IG Farben Building at Offenbach was their site of choice.

— Seymour J. Pomrenze, 1998

== Post War activities ==
Upon his return from Europe in 1947, he taught at both the University of Kentucky and the University of Denver before earning his Ph.D. at the University of Chicago's Graduate School in 1958. From 1958 until 1978, he was a professor of Library and Information Science at SUNY-Geneseo. Following his retirement from the university, Poste was an antiquarian bookseller until his death in 1996.

== Publications ==
- Poste, Leslie Irlyn, June 1958, revised August 1964, "The Development of US Protection of Libraries and Archives in Europe During World War II." Fort Gordon, GA: US Army Civil Affairs School. "Prepared ... as [the author's] doctoral dissertation at the Graduate Library School, University of Chicago." 329 pages. OCLC: 1152347.
- Poste, Leslie. 1948. "Books Go Home". Library Journal. December 1, 1948, page 1704.
- Poste, Leslie. 1947. "US Information Centers." Military Government Weekly Information Bulletin. Issue Number 100, July 7, 1947. Pages 4–6.
- Martin, James F., Leslie I Poste, and Paul Kruse. 1954. A brief history of the University of Denver Press: a paper. "August 9, 1954." "Paper presented to Mr. Leslie I. Poste and Mr. Paul Kruse, The University of Denver, in partial fulfillment of the requirements for the courses Research methods in librarianship and Literature of subject fields." Copies of the University of Denver Press 1948, 1950, 1952 book lists inserted at end.
- Tagung der Bibliotheksdirektoren der Amerikanisch Besetzten Zone, Stuttgart, 1946, and Leslie Irlyn Poste. 1946. Protokoll. 10 pages.
- Spahn, Raymond J., and Leslie I. Poste. 1949. "The Germans Hail America: Some Aspects of Communication Media in Occupied Germany". Modern Language Journal. 33 (6): 417–426. ISSN 0026-7902.
- Poste, Leslie I., and A. Noblecourt. 1959. "Review of Protection of Cultural Property in the Event of Armed Conflict". The Library Quarterly. 29 (3): 212–213.
- Poste, Leslie I. 1969. ":Kriegs- und Nachkriegsschicksale der Niedersächsischen Landesbibliothek in Hannover (1939-1950)". The Library Quarterly. 39 (2): 200-200.

== Sources ==
- Edsel, Robert (2009). "Leslie I. Poste (1918-1996)". The Monuments Men. Archived from the original on January 15, 2012.
- Farmer, Walter Ings (2000). The Safekeepers: A Memoir of Arts at the End of World War II. Walter de Gruyter. ISBN 9783110168976.
- Pomrenze, Seymour J. (November 30, 1998). "Personal Reminiscences of the Offenbach Archival Depot, 1946-1949. Fulfilling International and Moral Obligations". Archived from the original on September 27, 2012.
- Poste, Leslie Irlyn (1964). The Development of US Protection of Libraries and Archives in Europe During World War II.
- Stubbings, Hilda Urén (1993). Blitzkrieg and Books: British and European Libraries As Casualties of World War Ii. Rubena Press. ISBN 1880622025. LCCN 92064467. OCLC 28316461. OL 1748520M.
