= Mattityahu Strashun =

Lithuanian Talmudist (1817–1885)

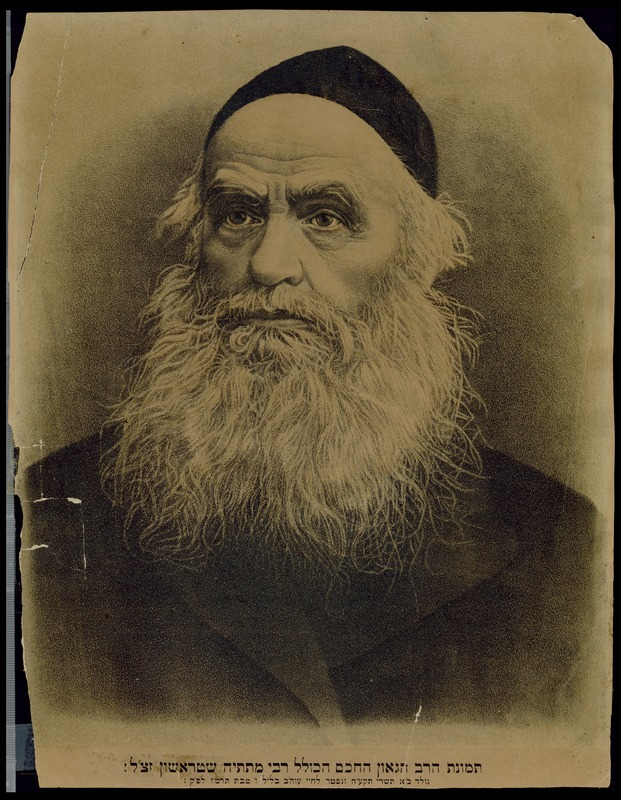
- Born: October 1, 1817; Vilnius, Lithuania
- Died: December 13, 1885 (aged 68); Vilnius, Lithuania
- Occupation(s): Talmudist, Midrashic scholar, book collector, communal leader, philanthropist
- Known for: Strashun Library
- Notable work: Mattit Yah (1892)
- Parent(s): Shmuel and Sara Strashun

Mattityahu Strashun (Hebrew: מתתיהו שטראשון, also spelled Strassen; October 1, 1817 – December 13, 1885) was a Lithuanian Talmudist, Midrashic scholar, book collector, communal leader, and philanthropist. He amassed a significant private collection of books and rare manuscripts which formed the basis for the Strashun Library of Vilnius, which operated from 1892 to 1941.

== Early life and education ==
Mattityahu Strashun was born to Samuel Strashun (1794–1872), a prominent Talmudist and merchant, and his wife Sara Strashun, (Note: Samuel adopted his wife's surname upon their marriage.) in Vilnius, Vilna Governorate. Coming from a well-to-do family, Mattityahu, at the age of 13, married the eldest daughter of the wealthy Joseph Elijah Eliasberg. His father-in-law bought him a business dealing in silks, which his wife managed so he could dedicate himself to Torah study. Strashun was financially independent throughout his life.

Strashun studied under Rabbi Menashe of Ilya, a disciple of the Vilna Gaon, and Rabbi Yitzhak of Volozhin (son of Rabbi Chaim of Volozhin). In addition to mastering Talmud, Strashun acquired fluency in Hebrew and had a working knowledge of Russian, Polish, German, French, and Latin. He also studied mathematics, philosophy, history, and astronomy.

== Activities ==
Strashun was a diligent Torah scholar who was said to immerse himself in study 10 to 15 hours a day. His home was a gathering place for educated community members and visitors from abroad. During his 1857 trip around Europe to collect rare manuscripts, the Berlin Jewish community asked him to serve as their Rav, but he declined.

He published more than 300 articles of Midrashic commentary in various journals, including Pirchei Tzafon, Kerem Hemed, Hamagid, and HaLevanon. He generally wrote under a nom de plume, such as Ani Ve-Hu and Ve-Hu Ve-Hu. His textual scholarship on the Midrash was published in his sefer Mattat Yah (1892); other annotations were included in the German translation of the Midrash Rabbah by August Wünsche. His historical study of Vilnius, titled Rehovot Kiryah (Streets of the City), was published as an addendum to Samuel Joseph Fuenn's Kiryah Ne'emanah (Faithful City) (1860).

Strashun was also active in communal affairs. He served as president of the Central Charity in Vilnius and was the gabbai (secretary) of the Torah Study Society, the Burial Society, and the fund for charity for the poor in Israel. He maintained good connections with the government and was appointed to the city council of Vilnius and to the board of the Vilnius branch of the Russian Imperial Bank. In 1878, he received a gold medal from the government for the latter service. The government also made him an honorary member of the Society for the Promotion of Culture among the Jews of Russia. Strashun used his government connections and his wealth to organize the exemption of 58 Vilnius Jews from forced conscription.

== Library ==
In 1857 Strashun traveled to countries outside Russia to amass a private collection of Hebrew books and rare manuscripts. Strashun's collection included "religious writings, fiction, poetry, scientific works, Jewish and Karaite historical works, travel accounts, and Hasidic texts". The collection encompassed works published in Turkey, Greece, Italy, Germany, Holland, Bohemia, and Poland from the 1400s through the 1800s. Listed at 5,700 pieces, the library was catalogued in the 1889 publication Likutei Shoshanim (A Bunch of Roses). Strashun bequeathed the collection to the Vilnius community upon his death.

His collection formed the basis for the Strashun Library of Vilnius, which opened in Strashun's home in 1892 and moved to its own building in 1901. With donations of books by other scholars and contributions from the Vilnius University Library, the collection expanded to 33,000 titles by 1931. During World War II, the Strashun Library was looted and partially destroyed by the Nazis; in 1945 about 40,000 volumes were retrieved by the U.S. Army in Germany. The YIVO Institute was one of the beneficiaries of the collection. In June 2017 the Strashun Library was entered into the UNESCO Memory of the World Registry in a ceremony held by the Directorate of the State Cultural Reserve of Kernavė, which retains 1,300 prints.
