= Offenbach Archival Depot =

German Nazi-confiscated media collecting point

The Offenbach Archival Depot was a central collecting point in the American Sector of Germany for books, manuscripts and archival materials looted, confiscated or taken by the German army or Nazi government from the occupied countries during World War II. From the Offenbach Archival Depot, these materials of looted art and Nazi plunder were sorted and eventually returned to their original country of origin, or otherwise maintained in new collections.

== Offenbach Location ==
By early 1946, however, the U.S. Army had embarked on an organized effort to repatriate some 3 million books that had been looted by the Nazis. They collected the loot in a warehouse in the town of Offenbach am Main, just outside Frankfurt, under the control of Seymour Pomrenze. The Offenbach building had itself been confiscated from the chemicals conglomerate, I.G. Farben, that had manufactured the gas used at Auschwitz and other concentration camps.

The original collecting point in 1945 was the Rothschild Library in Frankfurt, but the overwhelming numbers required them to find a new location in the I. G. Farben building in Offenbach. This five story building was soon renamed the Offenbach Archival Depot. General Dwight Eisenhower issued an order in September 1945 that all trained librarians who were officers in the Western Theatre of Operations were to report to him for possible duty in the Monuments, Fine Arts and Archives (MFA&A). Lt. Leslie I. Posté (aka Leslie I. Poste) was selected from the other librarians for this duty, and ended up driving over a thousand miles a week in an open jeep around Hesse and Wuerttemberg-Baden, who helped select and set up the Collecting Point at Offenbach. Cataloging was streamlined under Librarian Leslie I. Posté, and some 300 books a day eventually increased to where millions of books could be returned to their libraries.

Captain Seymour Pomrenze was the first director of the depot. Captain Isaac Bencowitz was the second director.

== Institute for the Investigation of the Jewish Question ==
At the close of the war, books intended for the Nazis infamous museum, the Institute for the Investigation of the Jewish Question, had been found in a large private house in Frankfurt. The house in Frankfurt had been bombed, leaving the books stored in the cellar undamaged. One hundred and twenty thousand volumes were added to the Rothschild Library, which, although damaged, was still intact. These were later moved to the Offenbach Archival Depot, across the river from Frankfurt.

The German efficiency in selecting and removing these volumes from the occupied countries and sending them back to German is astounding. Also astounding is that many of the major collections remained more or less intact, and were recovered by the Allies at the end of the war. German libraries had preserved many of these Dutch collections, as well as their own. As such, much of the Biblioteca Rosenthaliana, the library of the Jewish Portuguese Seminarium of Amsterdam, the books of the Societas Spinozana, the Masonic collections of the Grand Orient of the Netherlands, the volumes of the Etz Chaim Seminarium, and twenty Sifre Toroth (plural of Torah) were returned to their country from the Offenbach Depot.

== Hermann Göring Collection ==
Some people collected looted materials as their right of conquest. Reichmarschall Hermann Göring was one of those. He amassed a large collection of artworks from the occupied countries. He also had a large personal library in Carinhall, his residence outside of Berlin. He also showed questionable taste in decorations.

The house contained a domed library with a 26 foot long desk of mahogany with bronze inlaid swastikas. The library also contained a pornographic table supported by four large replicated penises, each inserted through a pair of female breasts.

At the end of the war, Gőring had many of his library holdings, along with much of his art, taken by train in hopes of hiding his wealth. The train was found in Unterstein, near Berchtesgaden, and inside some of the boxcars were found over 11,000 books, maps and other records that were recovered by US Army intelligence officers from Gőring's personal library. Among these items were various Russian atlases, pamphlets, various autographed publications and files of SS personnel records. Many of these items are today kept by the Library of Congress. Other records found in the train included his personal records (Stabamt), including early correspondence with his first wife, Carin and his World War I military records. Today, these records are kept at the US Army Military History Institute in Carlisle, Pennsylvania.

Three large chests and 41 crates of books from the Gőring collection were sent to the Offenbach Collection Center, which distributed books. Ninety-two photo albums were sent to Washington, DC. The bulk of the albums and books may well have ended up in the Library of Congress, where a large number of them can be viewed today.

== Library of Congress ==
Many of the library materials collected at Offenbach were then returned to their countries of origin, if that could be determined. Materials for the US were divided into different groups. Those of agricultural interest, such as reports on husbandry or soil surveys, were sent to the National Agricultural Library. Those of commercial value were sent to the Department of Commerce. Those of medical value were sent to the National Library of Medicine. Many of those items of cultural, historical or undetermined value, were sent to the Library of Congress. Among these items were the personal libraries of Eva Braun and Adolf Hitler. The Hitler Library was in two parts, one part is called the Reichskanslei Library. This was several hundred books, folios and photographs, many of them complementary books on art and architecture, and a variety of current topics. The Eva Braun library is probably incorrectly ascribed to her, according to the variety of library stamps in the books. Other items were added to these collections from the libraries of Hermann Göring, Heinrich Himmler, Constantin von Neurath, and a series of typed autobiographies of prominent Nazi leaders.

== Science and Technology ==
Most of the items of military intelligence interest never made it to the Offenbach Depot for sorting. They were shipped directly to the US research institutions for disposal. However, many items of interest popped up during the sorting process. In January 1948, 1,157 shipments were made from the Offenbach depot to "the G-2 Document Control Section." The report does not indicate how many other shipments were made to the US Army Corps of Engineers or Military Intelligence operations before or after that date, nor how many items were in the numerous shipments to G-2.

== Reparations ==
About one million books that were still at the Offenbach Archival Depot in 1946 were never returned to the USSR because of a US decision not to repatriate unclaimed Jewish property, property of the Baltic republics (whose annexation by the Soviet Union was not recognized), or that of exile groups and institution like the Cossacks or Russian Orthodox Church...

After the war, many of the books hidden by the Germans were collected by the Monuments, Fine Arts and Archives section of the American military government, and collected at the Offenbach Depot. There, many of the larger collections were identified and eventually returned to their owners. By the end of 1948, "...the French regained the archives of the Paris bank of Rothschild Freres, the Libschutz Librairie de Paris, the library of the Alliance Israelite Universelle de Paris, the library of the Ecole Rabbinique de Paris, and the Biliothèque de Chinon."

Across the Main River in Offenbach, the Central Collecting Point for Judaica has opened its doors. Mournfully, in row upon row, it displayed objects of every-day Jewish life, religion and culture pilfered from East European shetl, impounded from Dutch and Belgian museums, confiscated from French or German Jews. In its cabinets bolted with iron bars there were letters, pictures, Torah scrolls, embroidered ark curtains, brass and silver menorah, Passover plates, and precious books and manuscripts. For Captain Isaac Bencowitz, a Rockefeller Institute chemistry professor, and director of the Central Collecting Point, and for his staff, the daily work of sorting, cataloging, and finding the owners of these objects was a poignant mission. Between March of 1946 and April of 1949 the Offenbach Archival Depot succeeded in returning to survivors, descendents and museums over three million looted items.

== Bibliography ==
- The Spoils of War: World War II and Its Aftermath: The Loss, Reappearance and Recovery of Cultural Property. Papers of a Symposium by the Bard Graduate Center for Studies in the Decorative Arts, January 1995, in New York. New York: Harry Abrams, Inc.
- Looted Books by Greg Murphy (2000)
