= Academica (library) =

Academica is a Polish online interlibrary system providing access to digital documents of the National Library of Poland that includes both copyrighted material for registered users in selected libraries within Poland as well as free access to public domain material.

Its scope is similar to that of Polona, the digital library of the National Library of Poland, and allows access to digitized periodicals, books, scores, and other library material within broad range of sciences and humanities. The project was developed in collaboration with the National Library of Poland, Foundation for Polish Science and Research and Academic Computer Network. The system is available since 2014. As of September 2017 Academica catalog lists 2,020,299 documents. The interface allows for search within the digitized version of the documents as well as its metadata including language, keywords, published date, and subject categories. It provides capability to perform full text searches for materials with OCR and limited capability for boolean expressions (for example it is possible to do fulltext search for "Jan Kowalski").

Additional functionality changes such as additional search options, increased OCR capabilities and access improvements are planned for 2017–2019 within the project OMNIS supported mostly by European Union funds.

== See also ==
- List of libraries in Poland
