= Biblioteka Nauki =

Database of Polish scientific publications

- Website type: database of Polish scientific publications
- Founded: June 2001
- Country of origin: Poland
- Owner: University of Warsaw
- Website: https://bibliotekanauki.pl/

Biblioteka Nauki is a Polish digital library containing in its database full texts of articles published in Polish scientific journals and full texts of selected scientific books.

== See also ==
- List of libraries in Poland
