= Maria Gorzechowska =

Polish teacher, librarian and social activist

Maria Gorzechowska (1883–1961) was a Polish teacher, librarian and social activist.

== Life ==
She was born 27 November 1883 in Siedlce, then in the Russian partition of Poland. Between 1900 and 1905 she studied philosophy and history of literature at the Flying University of Warsaw, she continued her studies at the Towarzystwo Kursów Naukowych and the Jagiellonian University (1910–1911). Simultaneously, in 1900 she started working as a school teacher in Warsaw and ran one of the libraries of the Warsaw Charitable Society (WTD). She also ran a number of illegal mobile libraries with Polish-language literature for the working class. In 1906 she became a full-time librarian at the Railway Library of the Warsaw-Vienna Railway. Between December 1911 and mid-1913 she worked for the Library Division of the WTD, and then until 1914 as one of the librarians in the Krasiński Library.

During World War I, following the German occupation of Warsaw in 1915 and the lift of the previous bans on using Polish language in the Russian-held part of Poland, she became the head person of the Library Division of the WTD. She oversaw the creation of a uniform network of scientific libraries in Poland. Since 1922 she also presided over the Public Library Society (Towarzystwo Bibliotek Powszechnych in Polish), established as an umbrella organisation for a number of Warsaw's libraries, including various reading rooms of the Library Society of Warsaw and 24 libraries run by the Public Library Society. She held that post until 1935, when all of the libraries under her care were taken over by the city of Warsaw. During her work she introduced many modern methods of library work, she also cared for training the library staff. During courses for librarians she personally taught history of literature.

Since 1917 she was an active member of the Polish Librarians Association (Stowarzyszenie Bibliotekarzy Polskich; SBP in Polish) where she took part in the works of both the Public Libraries Division and the Catalogue Commission. She retired in 1936. Following World War II she worked as a librarian for the Warsaw Medical Society (until 1958). Simultaneously, since 1950 she co-created the scientific library of the Medical Academy of Łódź.

She died 2 December 1961 in Łódź.

For her work in creating and strengthening Poland's libraries she was awarded the Officers' Cross of Polonia Restituta twice: in 1925 and in 1958.

== Publications ==
She co-authored the "Minimal catalogue of books for children and youth" (Katalog minimalny książek dla dzieci i młodzieży; published anonymously in 1918) and the Basic catalogue of books for public libraries (Katalog podstawowy książek dla biblijotek powszechnych; 1922).
