= Patrimonium (project) =

Polish national memory project

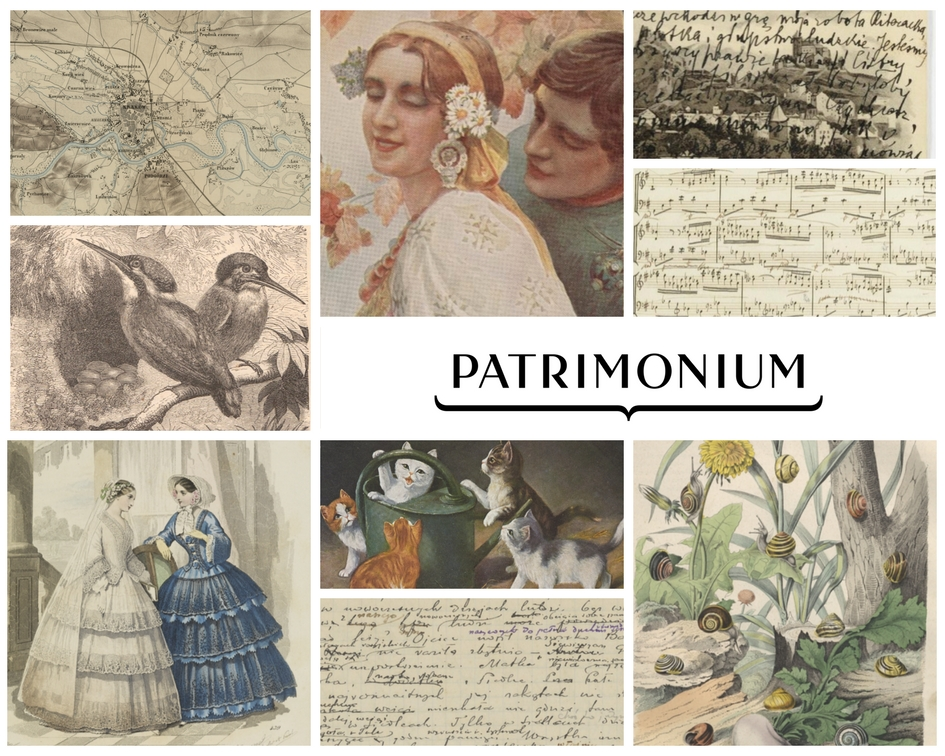
A collage of objects digitized within Patrimonium along with the project's logo

Patrimonium (full name Patrimonium – the digitalization and release of Polish national heritage from the collections of the National and Jagiellonian libraries) is a 3-year (2017–2020) project of digitization whose main aim is to provide wide and free access to the most valuable and oldest Polish written sources from the two largest libraries in Poland (the National Library and the Jagiellonian Library).

“Patrimonium” is co-financed by the European Regional Development Fund, sub-measure 2.3.2: “Digital sharing of cultural resources” of the “Digital Poland Operational Programme 2014–2020”, and by the Ministry of Culture and National Heritage of Poland.

== The idea of the project ==
The project was initiated by the National Library of Poland which, for many years, has been working on digitization of its collection and release in digital form. The implementation of this project improves digital access to numerous Polish written sources offered in the highest quality.

“Patrimonium” is a project that integrates the two collections – of the country's main library and its oldest academic library – which are unique on a national scale. The exceptional historical value of these collections and their important role in culture make them the core of the National Interlibrary Collection and, according to the regulation of the Minister of Culture and National Heritage of July 4, 2012, they are subject of particular conservation protection. Thanks to the digitization of the most precious items in their collections, both institutions are able to gradually limit access to the priceless originals for readers in favor of the use of their digital copies and replace them with their digital copies. The growing digital collection is available via both: Polona Digital Library and Jagiellonian Digital Library (JBC), whereas graphical interface of Polona will be further developed.

== Collections ==
The digitization process covers over one million items: 652 thousand items from the collections of the National Library of Poland and 348 thousand items from the Jagiellonian Library. This number includes manuscripts, maps, sheet music, drawings and engravings, as well as books from the 19th and 20th centuries. The largest group of the digitized items are periodicals and ephemera dating back to the 18th–20th c., often the only preserved copies. The lists of the objects digitized within the “Patrimonium” project are published on its website. All the works digitized in the project belong to the public domain, so they can be used for academic, educational, artistic and commercial purposes without any limitations.
