= Krzysztof Komorowski =

Polish historian (born 1947)

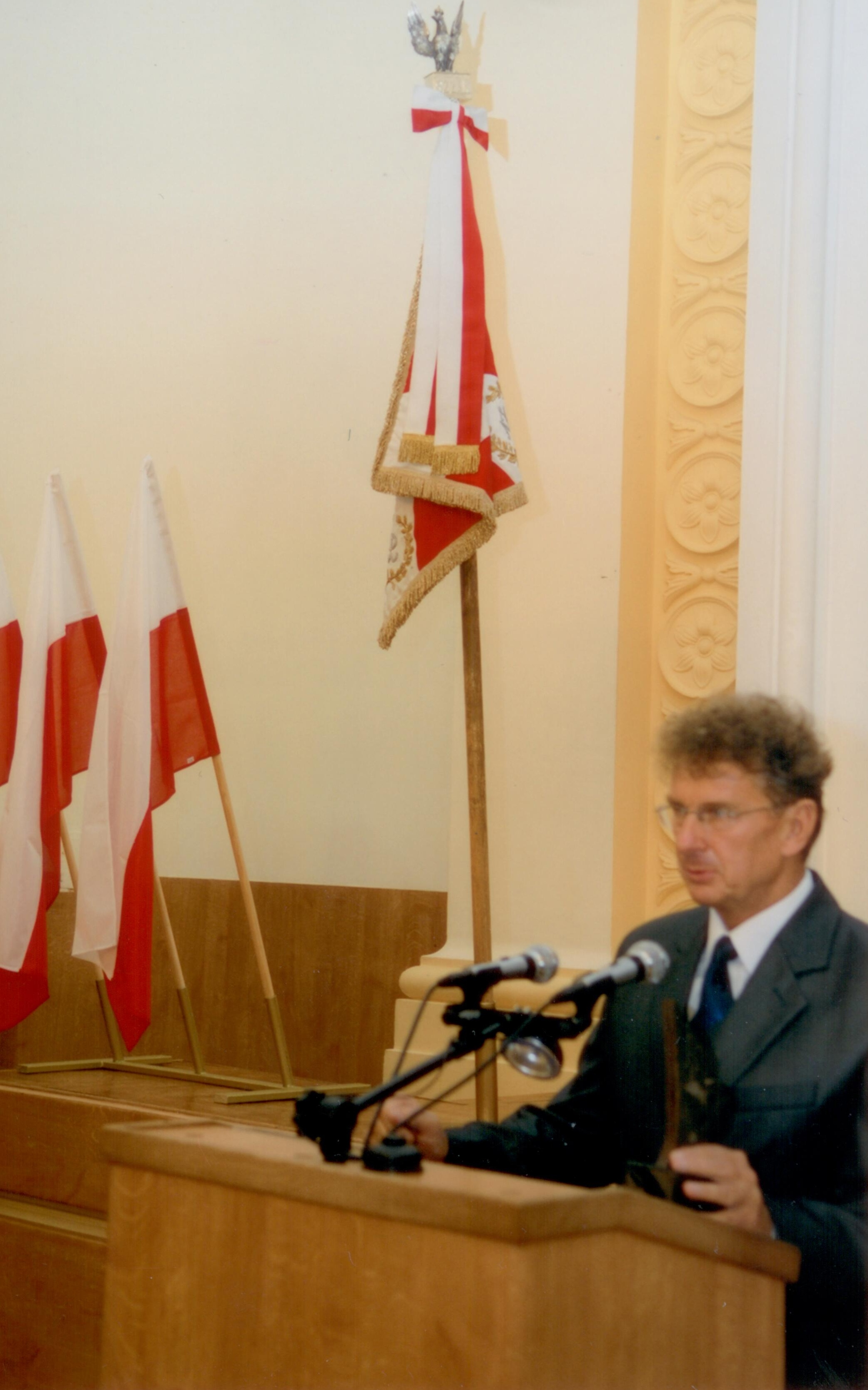
Krzysztof Komorowski

Krzysztof Komorowski (born 1947) is a Polish historian specializing in the Polish military history, as well as a (retired) officer of the Polish Army with the rank of colonel. A lecturer at the Military University of Technology and National Defence University of Warsaw.

From 1997 to 2003 he was the director of the Central Military Library. From 2003 to 2009 he has been the director of the Military Bureau of Historical Research.

== Selected works ==
- Gwardia Ludowa (1987)
- Konspiracja pomorska 1939-1947: leksykon (1993)
- Powstanie Warszawskie 1944 (1994)
- Armia Krajowa (1994, 1996)
- Wacław Lipiński: żołnierz, historyk, publicysta (1999)
- Polityka i walka: konspiracja zbrojna ruchu narodowego, 1939-1945 (2000)
- Bitwa o Warszawę '44: militarne aspekty Powstania Warszawskiego (2004)
- Anty-Katyń: jeńcy sowieccy w niewoli polskiej : fakty i mity (2006), also published in English as Anti-Katyń: Soviet Prisoners of War in Poland : Facts and Myths (2006)
- Katyń: zbrodnia nieukarana (2009)
- Boje polskie 1939-1945: przewodnik encyklopedyczny (2009)
