= Polona =

Polish digital library

- Website type: Digital library
- Available in: Polish, English
- Owner: National Library of Poland
- Website: www.polona.pl
- Commercial: No
- Registration: Optional
- Launched: 2006

Polona is a Polish digital library, which provides digitized books, magazines, graphics, maps, music, fliers and manuscripts from collections of the National Library of Poland and co-operating institutions. It began its operation in 2006.

== Collections ==
As of October 12, 2017 there were 2016037 objects, of which 863400 were on public domain. Every day, the Polona adds up to 2,000 digitized objects. Access to copyrighted material is available at the National Library of Poland reading rooms in Warsaw or within Poland through the Academica library system.

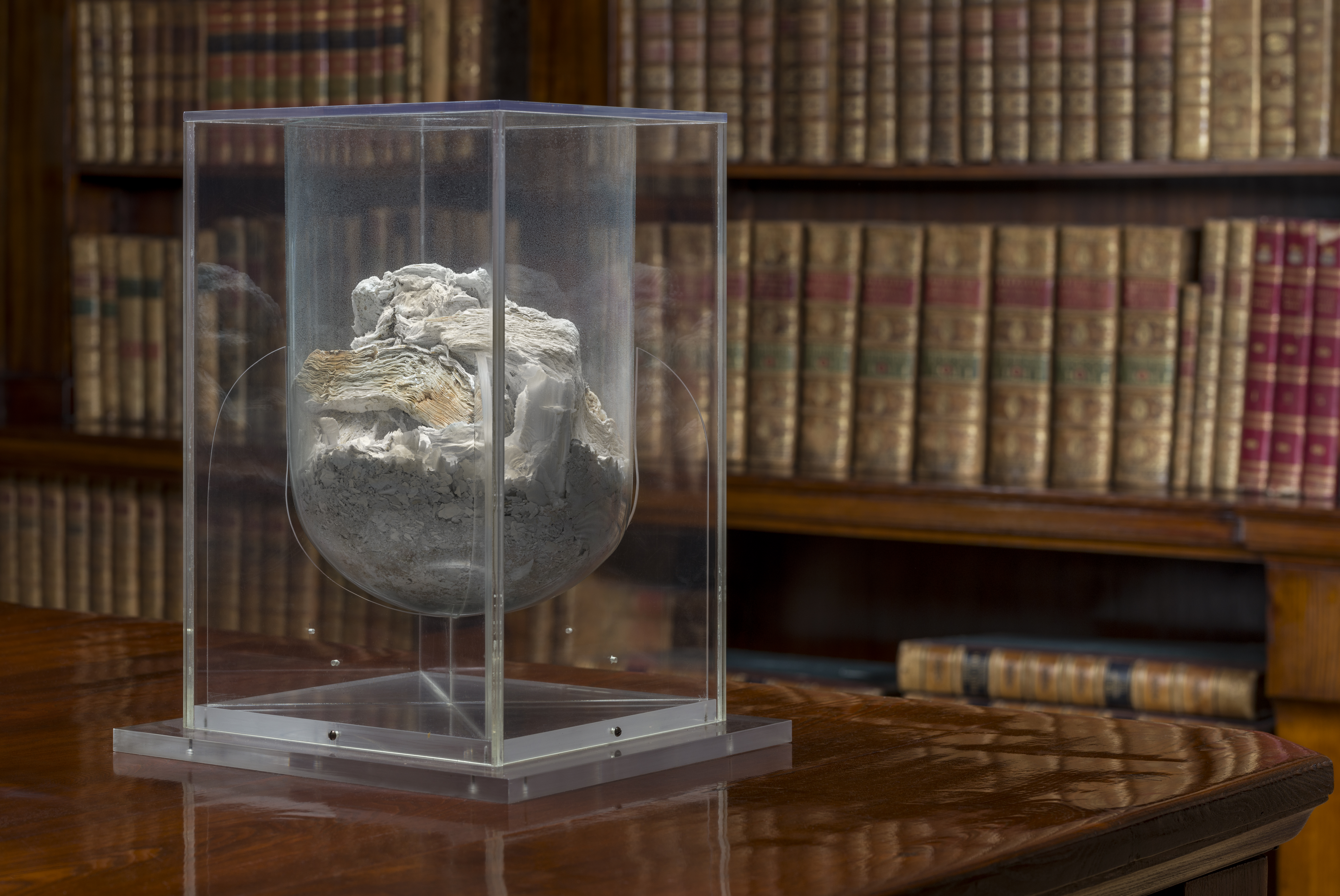
Urn containing the ashes of old prints and manuscripts originating from the Warsaw libraries gathered in the building of the Krasiński Library of the Legislature at ul. Okólnik 9. Brandkommando's division was destroyed after the fall of the Warsaw Uprising (shortly before 14 October). Two millionth object in the Polonium.

== Polona/2milions ==
On October 2, 2017, a new version of Polona was launched in the event named Polona/2milions. The name commemorated more than 2 million of objects available in Polona in that time. The casket with the ashes of ancient prints and manuscripts burned by Germans after the fall of the Warsaw Uprising in 1944 was cataloged as the 2 millionth object. They were originally from the Krasinski Library on Okólnik 9 Street in Warsaw.

Polona/2milions introduces several functionalities such as advanced search, press panel or private collections. In 2017 further plans to extend Polona digital library were announced within the e-service project OMNIS which aims to create "Polona for the libraries" and "Polona for scientists".

== Patrimonium ==
From January 2017, Polona resources are increased thanks to the implementation of the project "Patrimonium – the digitalization and release of Polish national heritage from the collections of the National and Jagiellonian libraries".

== Institutions ==
Polona presents not only the collections of the National Library of Poland, but also the collections of the Fryderyk Chopin National Institute, Czartoryski Library, the State Ethnographic Museum in Warsaw and others.

== See also ==
- List of libraries in Poland
