= Łódź University of Technology Library =

Library in Poland

Library of the Lodz University of Technology
- Biblioteka Politechniki Łódzkiej
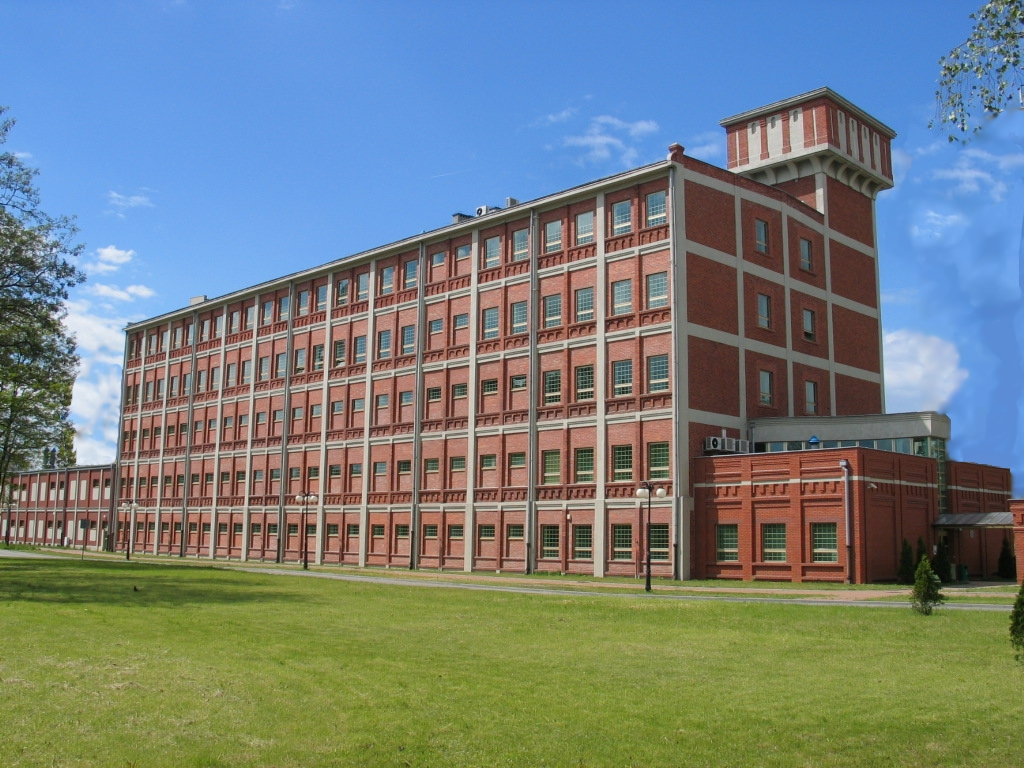
- Main library building
- 51°44′44.25″N 19°27′14.90″E
- Location: Łódź, Poland
- Type: Academic library
- Established: 1945

Collection
- Items collected: books, journals, newspapers, magazines, prints
- Size: 775 thousand items (approx.)

Other information
- Director: Elżbieta Skubała
- Website: bg.p.lodz.pl/en/

Library of the Lodz University of Technology (pol. Biblioteka Politechniki Łódzkiej, BPŁ) is a library of the Lodz University of Technology, Łódź, Poland. The library was founded in 1945. It began to offer its services with the collection of 930 volumes and four people of staff. Nowadays the library offers free access to over 250 thousand of books and over 130 thousand of journals, with reading rooms containing hundreds of places to study and over 120 computers for user’s needs and rooms for individual and group study. The Main Library also houses WIKAMP Center (Virtual Campus of the Lodz University of Technology) as well as an art gallery Biblio-Art.

== Building ==
The Library of the Lodz University of Technology is situated in the former factory depot building of the Joint-Stock Association of Wool Products owned by Frederick Wilhelm Schweikert.

In 1908 the Joint-Stock Association of Wool Products owned by Frederick Wilhelm Schweikert bought a plot at 223 Wólczańska Street of the area more than 10 000 m2. Around 1910, a five-storey factory depot building was erected on the plot. According to the initial assumptions, it was to be 21 meters wide and about 43 meters long. During the extension in 1913, the building was elongated by nearly 18 meters on the eastern side. Moreover, a tower with a water tank at the top was built in the north-east corner. Nowadays the building is 22 m wide and 100 m long. A few years ago the building and its interior were revitalized and adapted to the needs of a library: floors, window and door woodwork were replaced, ceilings were reinforced, and the interior was converted. The revitalisation design was developed at Autorska Pracownia Projektowa ARTA Sp. z o.o. The formal opening of Library's building was in 2004.

== Branches ==
Library and information network of Lodz University of Technology consist of Main library, 6 branch libraries and institute libraries. Branch libraries include.:

- Civil Engineering and Architecture Library
- Chemistry Library
- Biotechnology and Food Science Library
- Electrical and Electronic Engineering Library
- Mechanical Engineering Library
- Belletristic Library.

== Holdings ==
The Library collects scientific literature in the fields represented at the university and in related disciplines as well as leading publications of general literature. Printed collections are organized on four library floors in free-access zone and are searchable through library catalog Symphony provided by SirsiDynix company.

Statistics of the 2016 indicate that the library had:

- 254 598 books,
- 138 843 periodicals,
- 246 206 units counted as special collections (Polish standards, patents, PhD thesis etc.).

== Databases ==
Library provides access to national and international databases and online services. It offers 83 licensed databases, 7 941 e-journals and 209 901 electronic books.
Electronic resources include i.a. ProQuest, EBSCO, Elsevier, IEEE/IET Electronic Library, Knovel Library, MEDLINE, Web of Knowledge and Wiley Online Library.
Part of library's collection of printed resources has been digitalized and can be accessed through the digital library, which is available under Lodz Regional Digital Library CYBRA.

== See also ==
- List of libraries in Poland
