= Gdańsk University of Technology Library =

Biblioteka Politechniki Gdańskiej Gdańsk University of Technology Library
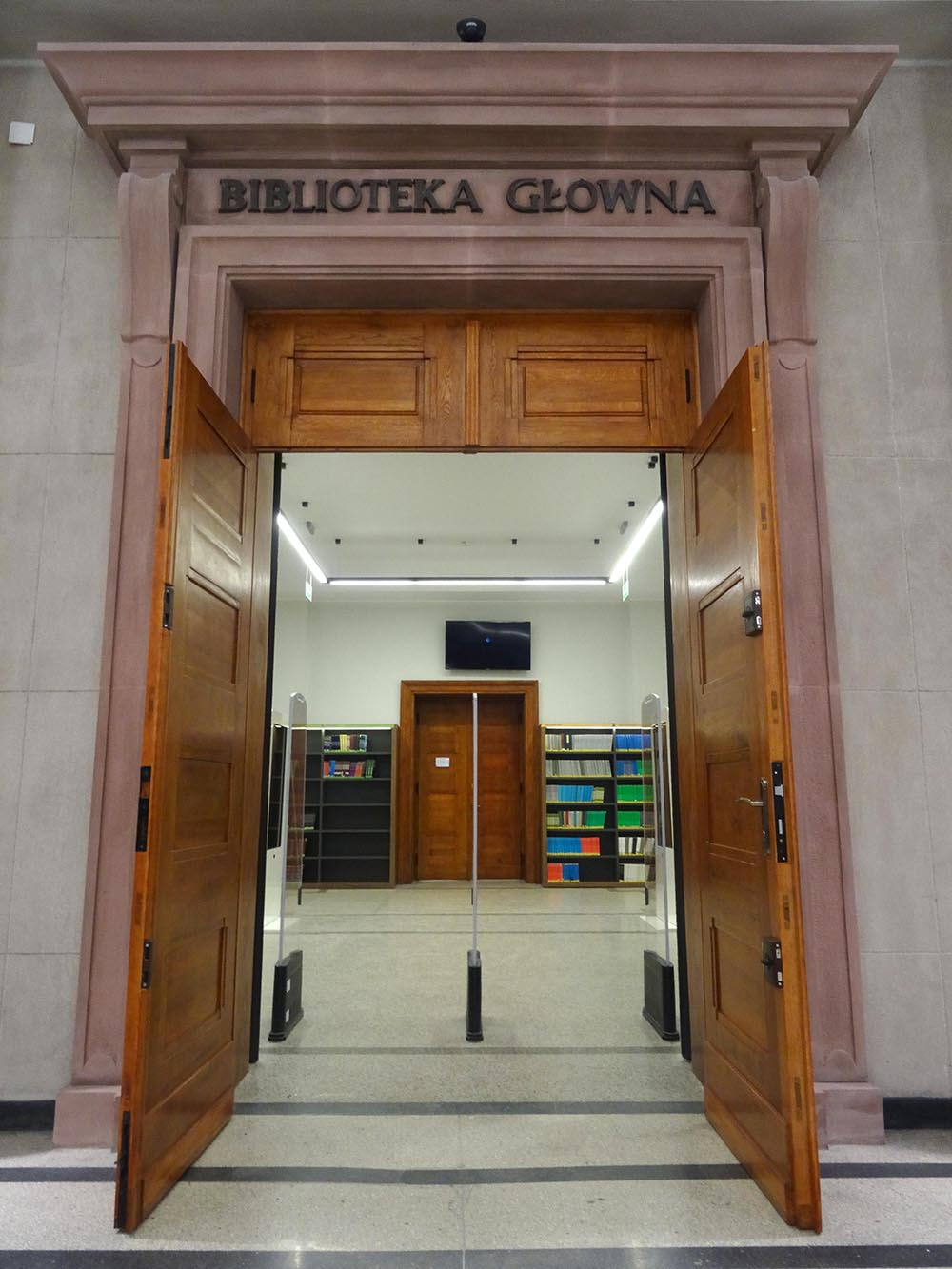
- Main entrance to the Library
- 54°22′17.8″N 18°37′10.6″E
- Location: Gdańsk, Poland
- Type: Academic and research library
- Scope: Engineering, architecture, chemistry, computer science, mathematics, physics, economics
- Established: 1945
- Branches: 8

Collection
- Items collected: Books, journals, newspapers, magazines, patents, databases, manuscripts
- Size: approx. 830 thousand of media units
- Legal deposit: No

Other information
- Director: dr Anna Dąbrowska
- Website: https://pg.edu.pl/biblioteka-pg/main_page

Gdańsk University of Technology Library (Polish: Biblioteka Politechniki Gdańskiej, abbrev. Gdańsk Tech Library) – is an academic and research library that holds the largest collection of technical literature in northern Poland. Gdańsk University of Technology Library was established in 1945. The Library collects books, journals and electronic publications that cover full range of disciplines represented at all eight faculties constituting the Gdańsk University of Technology. Each Gdańsk Tech faculty has its own branch library with a reading room.

== Organizational structure ==
The Gdańsk Tech Library is an administrative entity that consists of:

1. User Services Division comprising:
  - Lending Library/Information Centre,
  - Main Reading Room,
  - Current Journals, Databases, Information Science and Standards Reading Room
  - Eight branches with reading rooms at the faculties of: Chemistry and Applied Physics and Mathematics (Nanotechnology Regional Library), Architecture, Electronics, Telecommunications and Informatics, Electrical and Control Engineering, Civil and Environmental Engineering, Mechanical Engineering and Ship Technology (the branch at the former Faculty of Mechanical Engineering and the branch at the former Faculty of Ocean Engineering and Ship Technology), Management and Economics.
2. Current Journals, Databases, Information Science and Standards Reading Room.
3. Acquisition, Cataloguing and Classification Section.
4. Digital Archive and Multimedia Creation Section.
5. Library Historical Collections Section.
6. The Gdańsk Tech Library Director’s Office.

== History of the Gdańsk Tech Library ==
=== Until 1945 ===
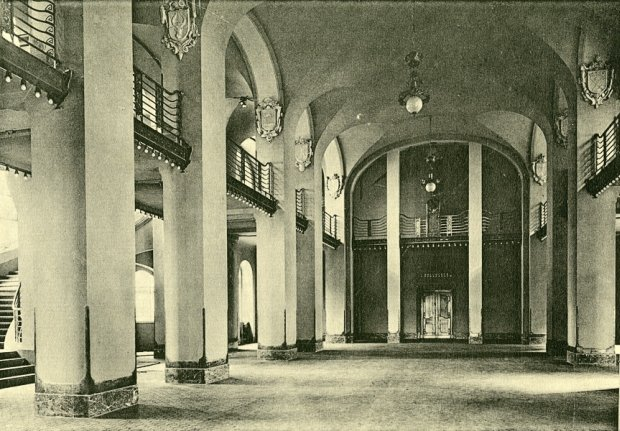
Main entrance to the Library in 1904

The history of the Gdańsk University of Technology Library as well as the history of University itself is marked by two dates: 1904 and 1945. The Library was established along with the Königliche Technische Hochschule zu Danzig in 1904. It has been located in the Main Building of the Campus, roughly where it is situated nowadays. During the early 20th century the Library was highly valued for being one of the most modern institutions in the region.

The Library collections were dynamically growing – from 26 000 volumes in the years 1908–1909 to 150 000 in 1943. In 1923 the Library received a valuable donation from Naturforschende Gesellschaft in Danzig (Danzig Research Society). The Society's book collection of 35 thousand volumes became the university's property by an arrangement between the organization and the Free City of Danzig Senate.

In January 1945 German authorities of the Gdańsk University of Technology (called Reichshochschule Danzig at the time) began the evacuation of German university staff members and the university collection of books to Schmalkalden in Thuringia. 500 chests with books and archives of the University were transported on a ship called "Deutschlad" to Kiel. The acts of World War II did significant damage to the collection – the books that were left in the Library were totally destroyed and only 3% of the book collection driven away in 1945 was regained by the University many years later (2000). The Main Building of the university where the library was located suffered the most during the war.

=== After 1945 ===
The library reopened its doors in 1945. In September, under the governmental decree, the University officially became a Polish state academy. The library staff (3 librarians) attempted to recreate the library integrating the books scattered in Gdańsk and in the area surrounding the city into one collection. The library books could be found in the departmental libraries, local manor houses, monasteries and schools.

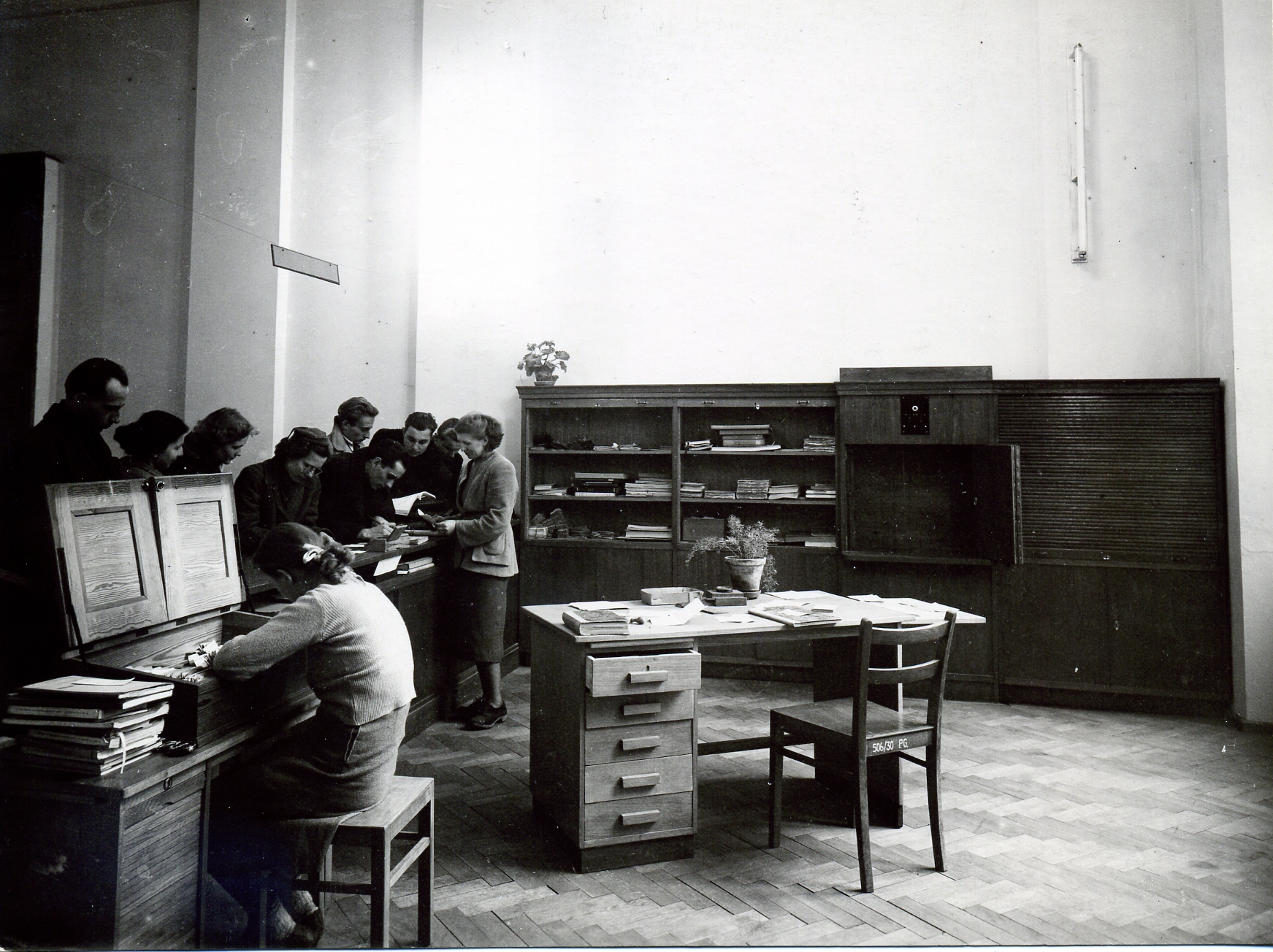
Post-war Gdańsk Tech library interior design (after 1945)

It was not until the 1950s when the University main building was reconstructed and the library could be moved to the renovated interiors. Bringing the library back into existence became possible thanks to the professional commitment of the first directors of the Library, especially Marian Des Loges and Barbara Mielcarzewicz. Gradually, the first post-war library managers formed new organizational structures, enlarged collections of Polish and foreign language technical literature and adjusted the library's services to the new realities.

In the early 1990s the Library was courageously entering a new era of computing. The library took steps towards the implementation of integrated library systems – at first it was APIS-ZB (1993), followed by VTLS/VIRTUA library computer system (2003) which has been in use until now. Along with the change of the quality of services, the library spaces needed to be modernized. Many innovative solutions were successfully implemented thanks to great organizational skills and dynamic leadership of Janina Ligman, Director of the Gdańsk Tech Library (1982–2000). She decided to optimize the storage of the library materials with mobile storage shelving system, which was not a common practice in Poland back in the 1990s.

The year 2000 is considered a landmark year in the history of the library and the university due to the fact that a part of the precious library book collection (originally belonged to Naturforschende Gesellschaft in Danzig) evacuated by prof. Ernst Witt in 1945 to Germany came back to Gdańsk. In 2000 about 850 volumes of early printed books, manuscripts and other materials that prof. Witt placed temporarily at University of Bremen, were regained by the Gdańsk Tech Library and came back to the Gdańsk University of Technology, where originally Naturforschende Gesellschaft wanted it to be. Some of them have been digitalized and are available in Pomeranian Digital Library.

== Library today ==
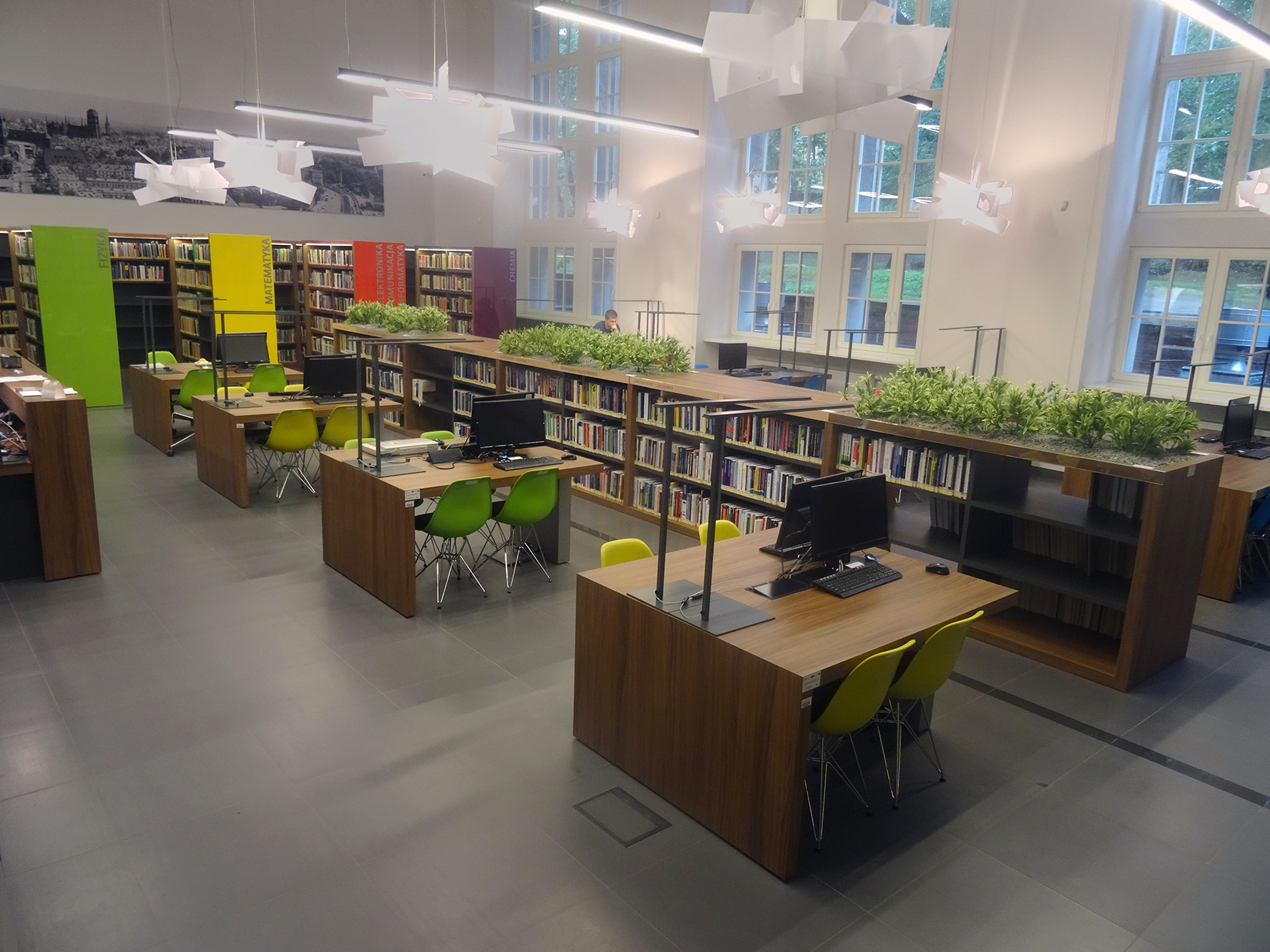
Renovated Main Reading Room

=== Location ===
Over the years, the Main Library has occupied the same location with a growing network of library branches that were progressively created at the university faculty departments. The Main Library was majorly renovated in 2014. There was a multimedia room created and equipped according to the needs of trainings conducted by the librarians. Since then the library has been offering its two comfortable reading rooms and one open space with open shelves organized by study subjects. This modern method of displaying the library collections was supposed to provide free access to shelves where users can choose by themselves the books they are interested in. RFID system was implemented as the new solution required new type of protection of the library stocks.

=== Collections ===
Aside from the printed collections, the library provides an array of electronic resources. Tens of online databases offer scholarly full text journals licensed from many of the world's most prestigious academic publishers such as Elsevier, IEEE, Nature, Emerald, Knovel and many more.

=== Digital library ===
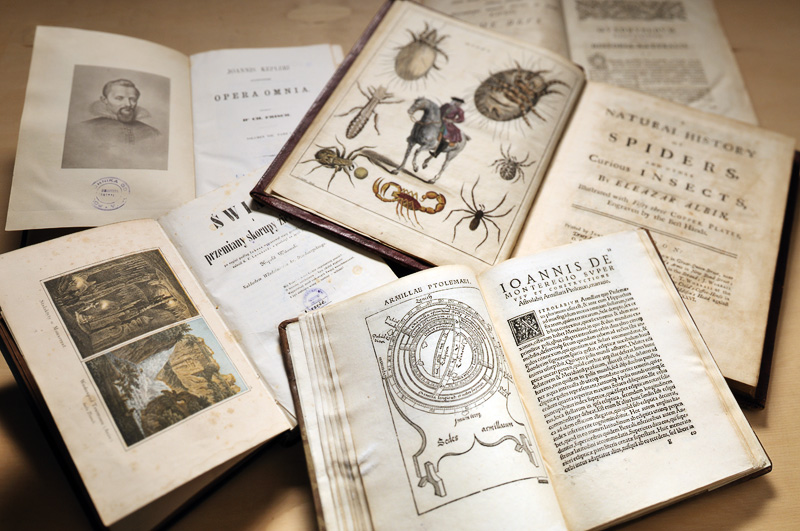
Some of the old prints from Gdańsk Tech Library collections

The Gdańsk Tech Library has been playing a leading role in the implementation of the Pomeranian Digital Library project (since 2010). The digital library provides access to cultural and scientific objects (e.g. manuscripts, early printed books, 19th and early-20th-century books, textbooks and some other educational materials in digital form, most of them as public-domain resources).

=== Repository ===
The Gdańsk Tech Library plays an important role in an institutional repository project, called MOST Wiedzy (MOST is an acronym of Multidisciplinary Open System Transferring Knowledge, which in Polish means "Bridge"; the second part of the name "Wiedzy" means "Knowledge"). The project was initiated by Gdańsk University of Technology IT Services Center. MOST Wiedzy (English: Bridge of Knowledge) is a platform for collecting, preserving, and disseminating scientific publications, research data and other research and development work conducted at the Gdańsk University of Technology. The repository is also supposed to become a platform for cooperation between science and business.

=== Other activities ===
One of the main purposes of the Gdańsk University of Technology Library is to promote and support the internationalisation of higher education at the university. The library offers many learning opportunities for students from all around the world and seeks to provide all users with a comfortable environment providing access to well-managed library collections and other services. The main objectives of the internationalisation process include library staff mobility and cooperation and support of several library and Open Access organizations: CESAER, IATUL, IFLA, LIBER and SPARC Europe.

Dr. Anna Wałek, Director of the Gdańsk University of Technology Library, is a member of the IATUL and SPARC Europe Boards of Directors. In July 2021 Dr. Wałek was appointed the President of IATUL.

Gdańsk Tech Library’s large collection of Polish technical journals and periodicals was a basis for cooperation with the BazTech bibliographic database.

== See also ==
- List of libraries in Poland
