= Stefan Vrtel-Wierczyński =

Stefan Vrtel-Wierczyński (1886 - 1963) was a Polish librarian and bibliographer, historian of Polish and Slavic literature, Professor of Adam Mickiewicz University in Poznań.

Vrtel-Wierczyński attended gymnasium in Stryj before studying at Lwow University. From 1906 to 1908 he was a scholarship holder of Ossolineum in Lwów. He later lectured at Jan Kazimierz University in Lwów.

From 1927 to 1937 and 1947 to 1950 he was director of the university library in Poznań. From 1937 to 1940 and 1945 to 1947 he was director of the National Library. In 1948 he established the Polish Literary Biography, created within the structures of the Institute for Literary Research. He also published monuments of mediaeval literature. He was creator and (from 1952 to 1962) director of the Department of West-Slavic Literature (later renamed Department of Slavic Literature).

At the Różany Potok, a house estate adjacent to Poznań university campus there is S. Vrtel-Wierczyński Street.
