= Main Judaic Library =

Former library in Warsaw, Poland

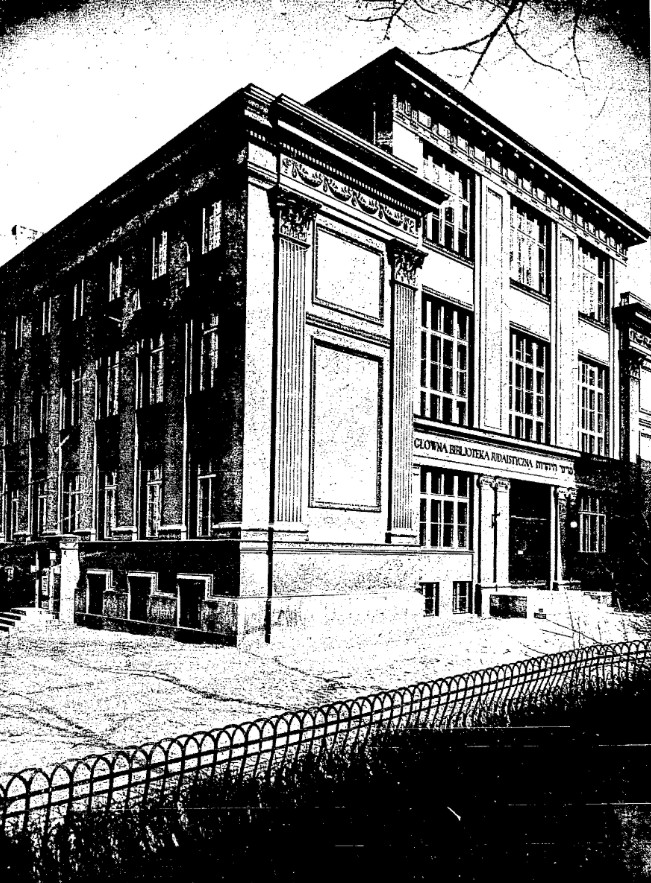
The building of the Main Judaic Library, erected in the years 1928-1936 at Tłomackie Street 3/5. Edward Eber’s design.

Main Judaic Library (Główna Biblioteka Judaistyczna or Centralna Biblioteka Judaistyczna) is a currently defunct library, which was gathering collections concerning Judaism and the history of Jews in Poland.

== Description ==
It was created as The Great Synagogue of Warsaw’s library between the years 1879 to 1880 at the behest of Ludwik Natanson, who had come up with the idea in 1860. The funds for setting up the library were raised through public collections and its existence was further assured by contributions from private founders along with a committee of the synagogue. The Historical Commission was functioning within the Library for many years, up until 1914, with its main purpose to gather collections, including documents from qahals’ archives and a variety of manuscripts. Samuel Poznański was in charge of the Commission. Mojżesz Moszkowski was a long-standing librarian.

In 1927, Moses Schorr led activities to build a new headquarters of the Library. The new facility of the Main Judaic Library, erected between 1928-1936 at Tłomackie Street 3/5, was designed by Edward Eber. The building was designed in modernized historicism (semi-modernism), corresponding to the architecture of the Great Synagogue. It was also the headquarters of the Institute for Judaic Studies.

From November 1940 until March 1942, the building was within the Warsaw Ghetto borders. It hosted the headquarters of the Jewish Social Self-Help, a staging point for Jews forcibly resettled from Germany and a storage unit for furniture stolen in the ghetto. Although it sustained damage, the edifice endured the Warsaw Ghetto Uprising and the Warsaw Uprising, yet the Library’s collections were looted by the Germans. Some were restored after the war (according to other sources, the Library had lost all of its stock, i.e. 40,000 units).

On 16 May 1943, there was a fire in the Library which had begun after the explosion in the Great Synagogue. Traces of the fire on the lobby’s floor are visible today. The building’s address was Świerczewskiego Avenue 79 until the name of Tłomackie Street was restored in the 1980s.

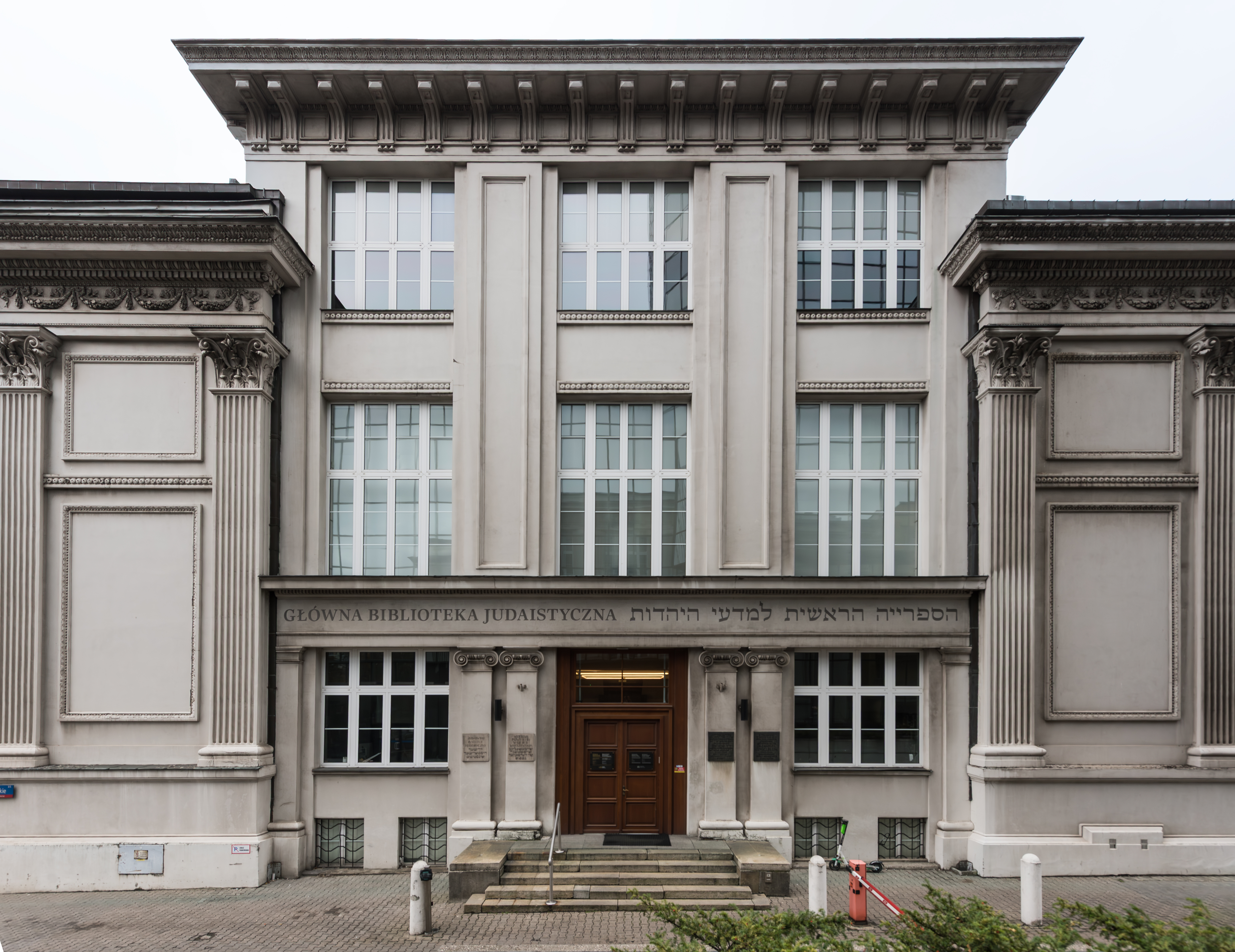
The facade of the building. Description in Polish and Hebrew recreated in 2016 is visible.

The building of the former Main Judaic Library is currently the headquarters of the Jewish Historical Institute.

The part of the ghetto that included the Great Synagogue and the Library in the years 1940-1942 has been commemorated by the Warsaw Ghetto boundary marker on the corner of Bielańska and Corazziego streets in 2008.

The mission of the Main Judaic Library is continued by the Central Jewish Library project.

In May 2016, the prewar inscription Main Judaic Library in Polish and Hebrew were recreated and placed above the main entrance.

== See also ==
- List of libraries in Poland

== Bibliography ==
- Zofia Borzymińska, Rafał Żebrowski: Polski słownik judaistyczny. Dzieje, kultura, religia, ludzie. T. 1. Warszawa: Prószyński i S-ka, 2003, s. 189-191. ISBN 83-72551-75-8.
