= Conference of Directors of National Libraries =

International association of library executives

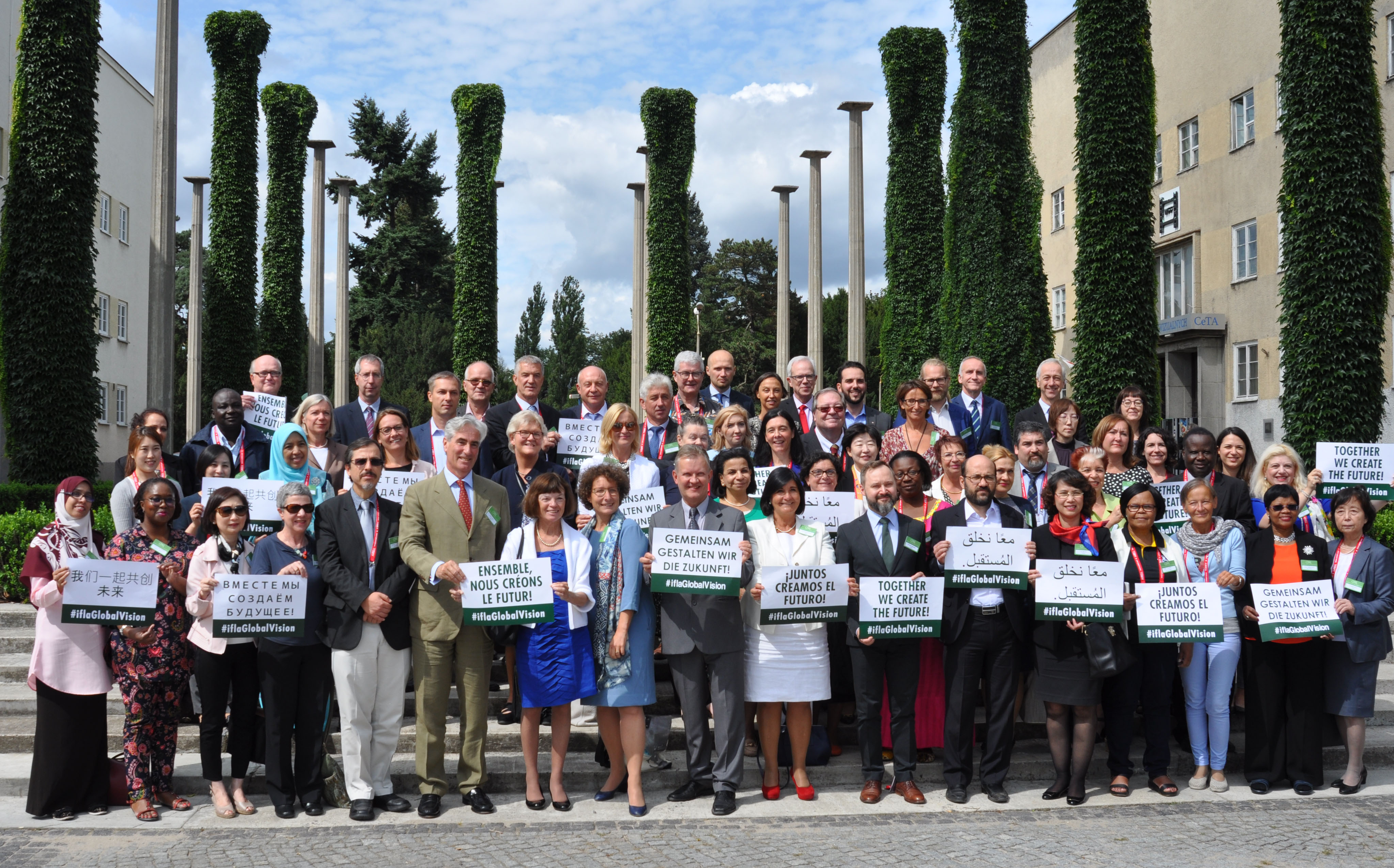
Members of the CDNL at the IFLA World Library and Information Congress in 2017

The Conference of Directors of National Libraries (CDNL) is an international association of the chief executives of national libraries. Formed in 1974, CDNL hosts a meeting every year at the national library of the host of that year's IFLA World Library and Information Congress. The CDNL plays a fundamental role in international cooperation between libraries and has been instrumental in setting common standards for information exchange and digital preservation. Elected in 2025, the Chair of the CDNL is the Polish librarian Tomasz Makowski.

== See also ==
- International Federation of Library Associations and Institutions
- List of library associations
