= Tomasz Makowski (librarian) =

Polish librarian (born 1970)

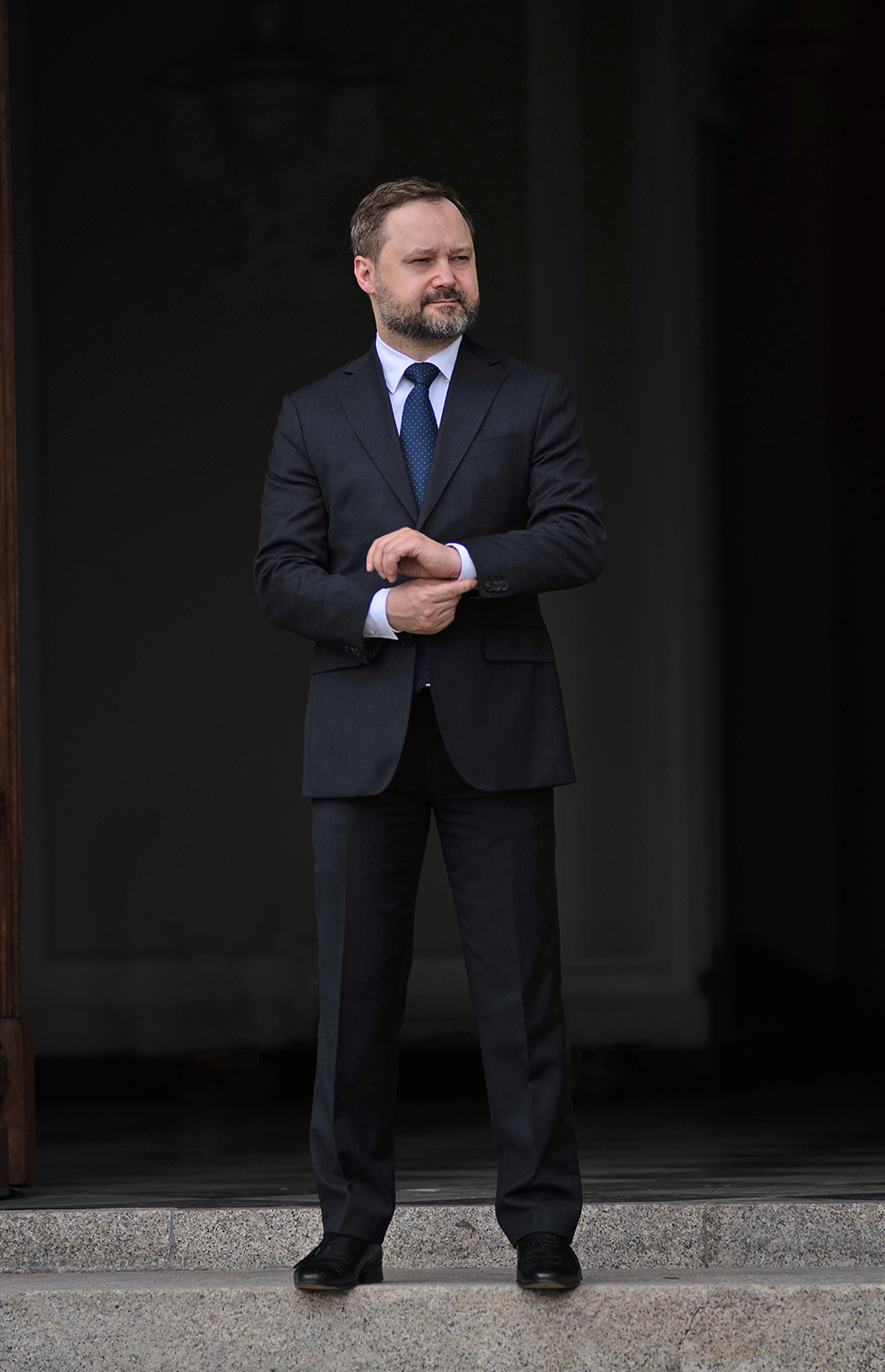
- Tomasz Makowski in front of Krasiński Palace in Warsaw (2020)

Director of the National Library of Poland
- Incumbent
- Assumed office 2007
- Preceded by: Michał Jagiełło

Personal details
- Born: 1970 (age 55–56)
- Education: Cardinal Stefan Wyszyński University, Warsaw

Tomasz Makowski (Polish pronunciation: [ˈtomaʃ maˈkofskʲi]; born 1970) is a Polish librarian and historian. Since 2007, he has served as Director General of the National Library of Poland and the head of the National Council of Libraries and the National Library Resources Committee at the Ministry of Culture and National Heritage. Since 2025, he is the Chair of the Conference of Directors of National Libraries (CDNL).

Makowski has worked in the National Library since 1994. Prior to being appointed Director General in 2007, he was Deputy Director General and Director for Research, as well as Head of Special Collections at the Library.

He specializes in the history of libraries and manuscript studies. In 2001 he completed his doctorate in history, specializing in modern Polish history, at Cardinal Stefan Wyszyński University in Warsaw. His doctoral thesis, was entitled Jan Zamoyski’s Crown Chancellor and Commander-in-chief Library (Polish: Biblioteka Jana Zamoyskiego kanclerza i hetmana wielkiego koronnego (1542–1605).

Makowski is a member or board member of a large number of organizations and institutions in Poland and abroad:

- Member of the National Museum in Kraków Board (2006–2010)
- Member of the Łazienki Królewskie Museum Board (2006–2010)
- Member of the Archives Board under the General Director of State Archives (2006–2017)
- Member of The Fryderyk Chopin Institute Programme Board (2007–2017)
- Member of Management Committee of The European Library (2009–2013) and a Board Member (2007–2009)
- Standing Committee of the IFLA National Libraries Section (2011–2015)
- Honorary Member of the Association internationale de bibliophilie (since 2011)
- "Fides" Federation of Ecclesiastical Books
- Member of the Council of the Museum of Warsaw (since 2009) and its Chairman (2014–2022)
- Vice-Chairman of the Memory of the World National Committee at UNESCO (since 2019)
- Chairman of the Scientific Council of the Ossoliński National Institute (since 2022)
- Silesian Library
- Central Agricultural Library in Warsaw
- Book Institute
- Council of the National Institute of Polish Cultural Heritage Abroad POLONIKA

On October 3, 2024, in Brisbane, Australia, he was elected Vice-Chair of the Conference of Directors of National Libraries (CDNL) by directors of national libraries from around the world. On June 5, 2025, he was elected Chair of the CDNL.

Makowski has been a member of the jury of the Kazimierz Moczarski Historical Award (since 2013) and the panel for the Jerzy Giedroyc "Rzeczpospolita" Award (since 2019). He also served as Deputy Chairman of the Organising Committee for the Year of Zbigniew Herbert celebrations. In 2005 he curated the first monographic exhibition about the Zamoyski Library. He was part of the Culture Pact Team at the Polish Prime Minister's Office (2011–2016).

Since 2008 he has been a member of the Polish-Ukrainian Intergovernmental Commission and since 2014 a member of both the Polish-Lithuanian Expert Group for the Preservation of Cultural Heritage and the Polish-Belarusian Consultative Commission for the Preservation of Cultural Heritage. In 2009 he received the "In Recognition" medal of the Association of Polish Librarians and in 2008 the Gold Award of the Association of Polish Booksellers. In 1999 he was awarded a scholarship by the Lanckoroński Foundation. In 2009 he received the "In Recognition" medal of the Association of Polish Librarians and in 2008 the Gold Award of the Association of Polish Booksellers.

Makowski is Editor-in-Chief of the journals "Polish Libraries" and "Rocznik Biblioteki Narodowej". Since 2017 he has been a member of the Scientific Advisory Board of the journal "Library Review" and since 2013 on the Editorial Board of "Lietuvos mokslu akademijos Vrublevskiu biblioteka". From 2014 to 2018 he sat on the Scientific Council of the "Almanach Warszawy".

Makowski is the author of five books:

- Poselstwo Jerzego Ossolińskiego do Rzymu w roku 1633 (1996)
- Autografy świętych w zbiorach Biblioteki Narodowej: in odore sanctitatis scriptum (1998)
- Biblioteka Ordynacji Zamojskiej: od Jana do Jana. Przewodnik po wystawie (2005)
- Rękopisy w zbiorach kościelnych (2014, with Patryk Sapała)
- The Palace of the Commonwealth. Three times opened. Treasures from the National Library of Poland at the Palace of the Commonwealth (2024, with Patryk Sapała)

He is also the author of several dozen articles.

== Controversies ==
- In February 2025, the Trade Union of Librarians of the National Library prepared a petition calling for the dismissal of Tomasz Makowski from his position as Director of the National Library.
- According to the findings of journalist Paweł Piotr Reszka, shortly after the Law and Justice Party (PiS) won the parliamentary elections in 2015, the Ministry of Culture planned to dismiss Tomasz Makowski from his position as Director of the National Library, but this decision was reversed after a phone call from Cardinal Stanisław Dziwisz.
- For sixteen years, the National Library withheld access to the Anna-Teresa Tymieniecka Archive. Tomasz Makowski, attributed this decision to concerns over potential social unrest due to the content of the correspondence with Pope John Paul II. Director of the National Library was the only person with access to the archive and had reviewed its contents. He appeared in a three-part documentary series aired by TVN24+ titled 'The Secret of the Correspondence'. The acquisition of the Anna-Teresa Tymieniecka Archive cost over 10 million PLN, a significant portion of which came from public funds.
