= Central Military Library =

Main library of Poland Ministry of National Defense

Marshall Józef Piłsudski's Central Military Library
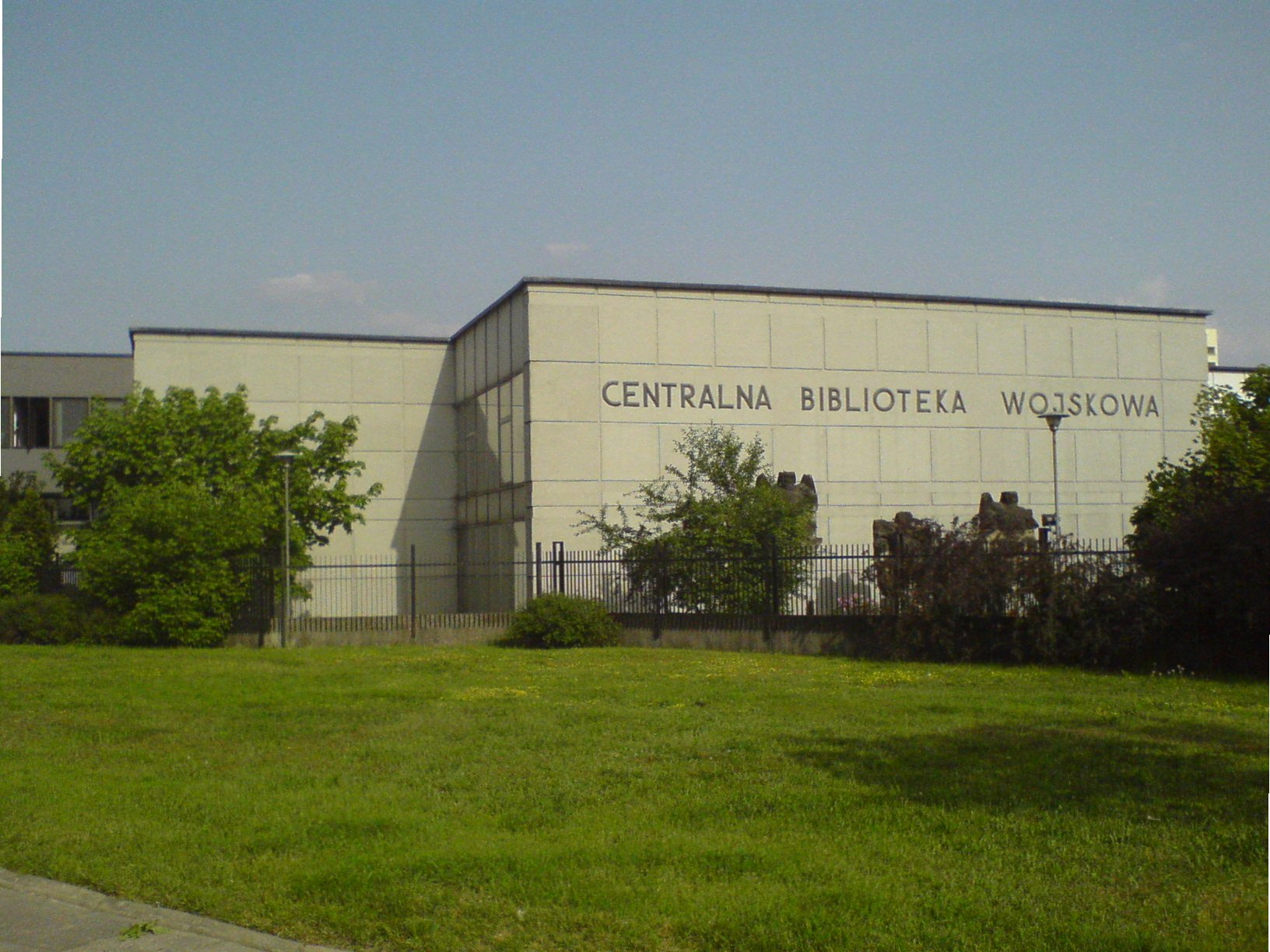
- 52°14′05″N 21°04′48″E
- Location: 109 Ostrobramska St. 04-041, Warsaw, Poland

Other information
- Website: http://cbw.wp.mil.pl/

Central Military Library (CBW) is the main library of Poland Ministry of National Defense located in Warsaw. In 2009, it was awarded the Gloria Artis Medal for Merit to Culture.

== Description ==
It serves as the leading library in the specialization of collections on war science, armed forces and military technology, forming the national library resource. It was established by an order of the Minister of Military Affairs on June 13, 1919. During the Second Republic, Lt. Col. Marian Lodynski from 1919 to 1933 and Jan Niezgoda from 1933 to 1939 served as director of the CBW.

During World War II, the Library lost 99% of its collection (406,000 out of 409,000 units).

From 1983 to 1991, the Central Military Library was named after Colonel Zbigniew Zaluski.

The CBW's book collection numbers about 600,000 library units and is unique in the military field. It includes:

- 276,000 compact prints;
- 143,000 Polish and foreign periodicals (483 titles, including 143 foreign titles from 17 countries);
- 154,000 special collections (old prints, manuscripts, photographs, ephemeral prints, maps, documents of military life).

The Central Military Library administers and manages the "Zbrojownia" Military Digital Library.

The CBW is involved in providing materials to the NATO Science and Technology Organization (NATO STO), the NATO Center for Maritime Research and Experimentation (CMRE) and the European Defense Agency (EDA).

== See also ==
- List of libraries in Poland
