= Krasiński Library =

Library in Warsaw, Poland

Coordinates: 52°14′07″N 21°01′18″E

- Biblioteka Ordynacji Krasińskich
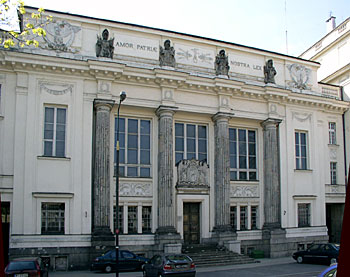
- Biblioteka Ordynacji Krasińskich
- Location: Okólnik 9, Warsaw, Masovian Voivodeship, Poland
- Established: 1844
- Dissolved: October 25, 1944; 81 years ago

Krasiński Library (Biblioteka Krasińskich w Warszawie) was a library in Warsaw, founded in 1844. During the German invasion and occupation of Poland, part of the building was destroyed and its collections were stolen, redistributed, or burned. Its surviving collections are now at the National Library of Poland.

== History ==
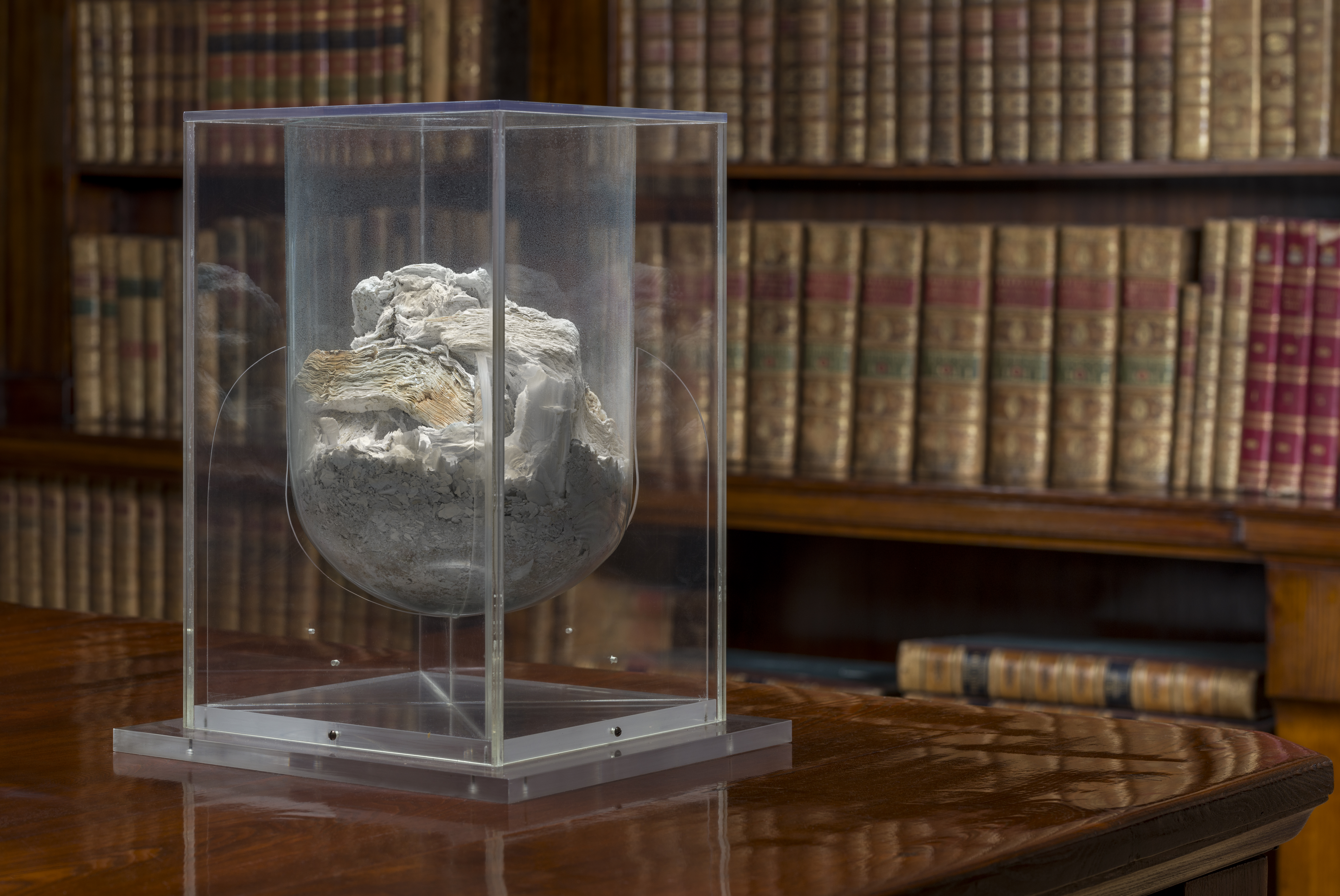
The urn containing ashes of the Polish most precious incunables and manuscripts burnt In the Krasiński Library following the fall of the Warsaw Uprising

Wincenty Krasiński originally founded the library in Opinogóra in 1844. This library consisted of his family archives and developed into one of Poland's best collections of national heritage. In 1930, the library was established at 9 Okólnik Street.

In September 1939, during the German invasion, the central part of the building was destroyed by bombs, damaging the museum, reading room, and reference collection. The collections stored in the stacks survived. Many rare manuscripts from the collection were commandeered by the Germans. During the winter of 1939–1940, library directors met to plan ways to preserve their collections and provide for library workers. The group was led by Professor Ketrzynski, representing the Krasinski Library. Meetings were discontinued after Nazi authorities caught wind of them, but the librarians continued to meet in casual gatherings, and eventually obtained passes to the library buildings and the ability to work there. They collected books from bombed houses and brought them to the libraries for safekeeping. There was a brief period when librarians tried to recover what they could, despite the owner, Count Edward Krasinski, being sent to a concentration camp. At this point, the Krasinski library had the largest collection of musical scores in Warsaw, along with several thousand maps and almost 60,000 prints and drawings.

Nazi occupiers founded the Staatsbibliothek Warschau in 1940, merging the collections of the National Library and University Library. Despite the efforts of the librarians, Krasiński Library was absorbed into the Staatsbibliothek Warschau in 1941. During the redistribution, its collections were moved to the Staatsbibliothek Warschau, the University Library, SGH and the National Museum. leaving the Okólnik building with a special collection of around 400,000 items. In September 1944, shortly into the Warsaw Uprising, bombs fell on the Okólnik building. Sections of the collection burned. People worked for a full day trying to rescue manuscripts. Some books were saved by being thrown out of upper-level windows, while books on the ground floor and basement levels were protected from the flames.

In October 1944, after the end of the Uprising, the Germans began burning libraries and continued until the end of the occupation. Krasiński Library lost about 150,000 pieces, including some of the rarest materials preserved from the Krasiński family collection.

== Post-World War II ==
After the war, the surviving collections (the largest of which being those on the Napoleonic Wars and November Uprising) were transferred to the National Library of Poland.

On October 2, 2017, during the event Polona/2milions, the digital library Polona catalogued as their 2 millionth object an urn with the ashes of books from the ruins of the Krasinski Library.

== See also ==
- List of libraries damaged during World War II
- List of libraries in Poland
