= National Library of Poland =

Central Polish library

National Library
- Biblioteka Narodowa

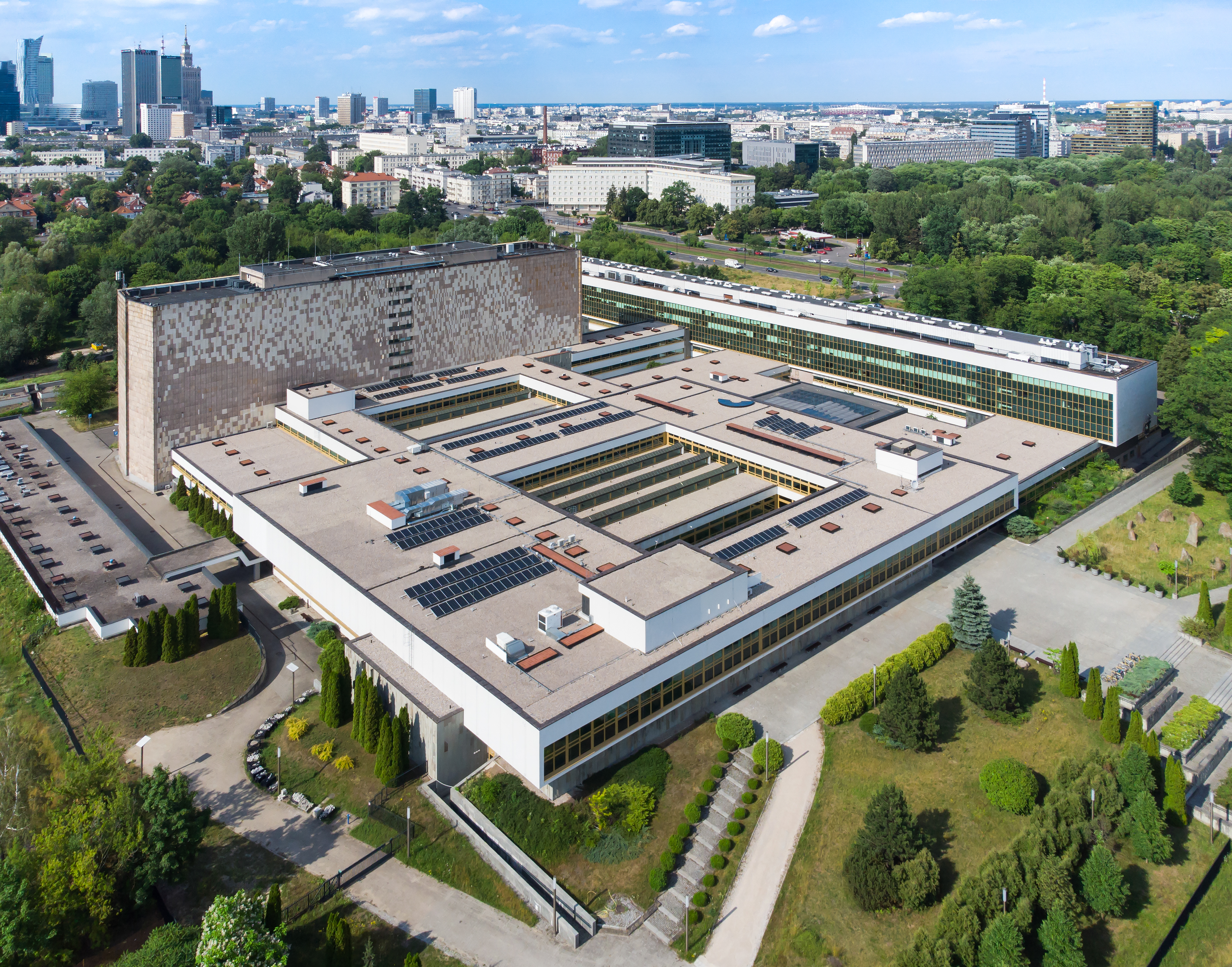
- National Library of Poland building in Mokotów Field, Warsaw
- 52°12′52″N 21°00′16″E
- Location: Warsaw, Poland
- Type: National library
- Established: 8 August 1747 (279 years ago) as Załuski Library; 24 February 1928 (98 years ago) as National Library

Collection
- Size: 10,431,867 (as of 31 December 2023)
- Legal deposit: Yes

Other information
- Director: Tomasz Makowski
- Website: www.bn.org.pl/en

The National Library (Polish: Biblioteka Narodowa, BN) is the national library of Poland, subject directly to the Polish Ministry of Culture and National Heritage. The main seat of the National Library is located in the Ochota district of Warsaw, adjacent to the Mokotów Field. It is one of the oldest cultural institutions in Poland, established as Załuski Library in 1732, which ultimately evolved into the National Library of Poland reactivated in 1928.

The library collects books, journals, electronic and audiovisual publications published in the territory of Poland, as well as Polonica published abroad. It is the most important humanities research library, the main archive of Polish writing and the state centre of bibliographic information about books. It also plays a significant role as a research facility and is an important methodological center for other Polish libraries.

The National Library was one of the first libraries in Europe that fulfilled the tasks of a modern national library in developing collections covering the entire body of Polish literature and making available to the public.

Literature and making those works accessible to the public receives a copy of every book published in Poland as legal deposit. The Jagiellonian Library is the only other library in Poland to have a national library status. With a collection of 10.6 million volumes, the National Library in Poland is the 33rd largest library in the world.

== Organizational structure ==
There are three general sections:

- The Library
- The Bibliographic Institute of the National Library
- The Book and Readership Institute

=== Directors ===
- Stefan Demby (1934–1937)
- Stefan Vrtel-Wierczyński (1937–1940, 1945–1947)
- Władysław Bieńkowski (1948–1956)
- Bogdan Horodyski (1956–1962)
- Witold Stankiewicz (1962–1982)
- Stanisław Czajka (1982–1992)
- Adam Manikowski (1993–1997)
- Jakub Zdzisław Lichański (1997–1998)
- Michał Jagiełło (1998–2007)
- Tomasz Makowski (from 2007)

== History ==
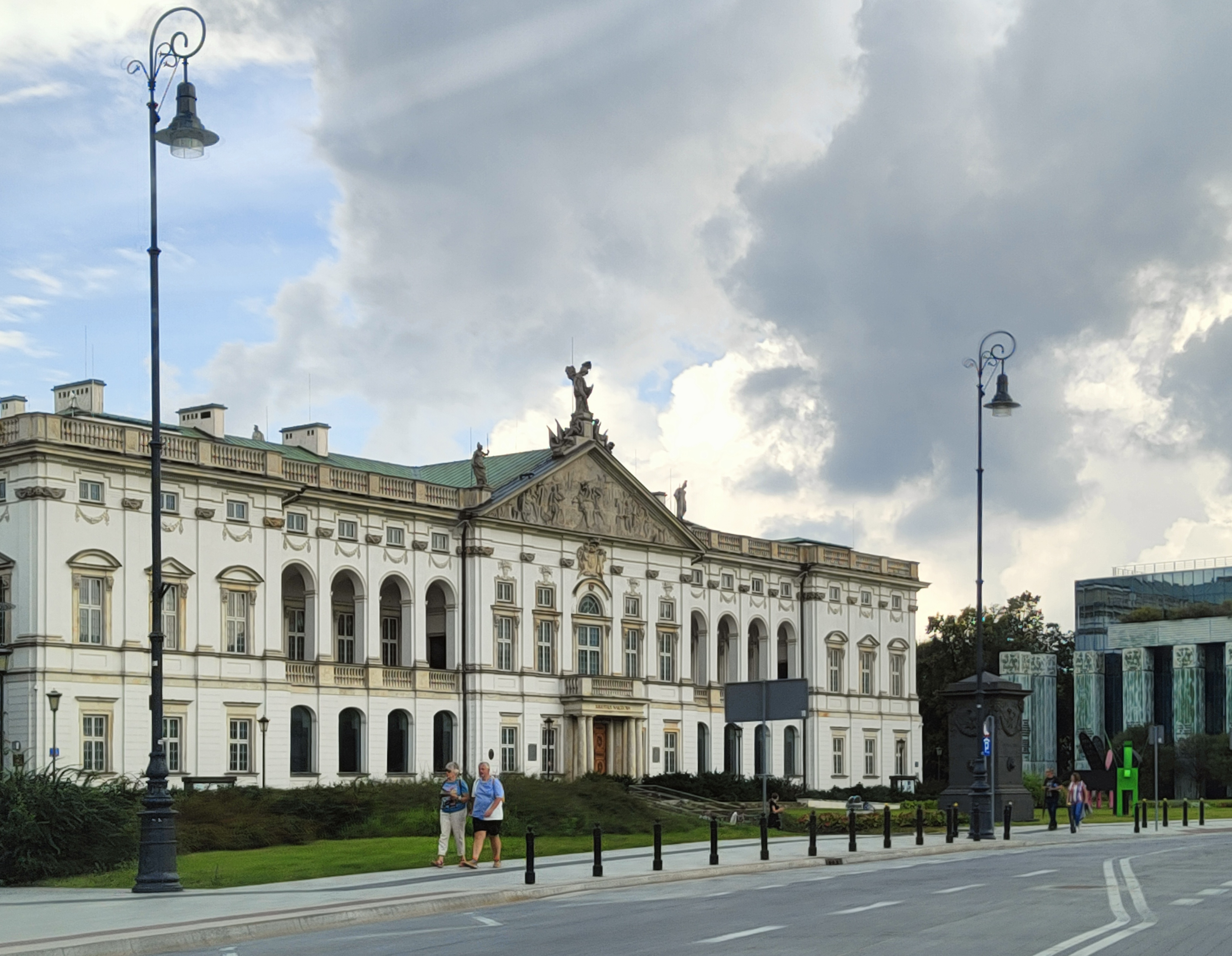
Special Collections Building: Krasiński Palace (Palace of the Commonwealth), Warsaw

The National Library's history has origins in the 18th century (Załuski Library) including items from the collections of John III Sobieski which were obtained from his grand daughter Maria Karolina Sobieska, Duchess of Bouillon. However, the Załuski collection was confiscated by troops of Russian tsarina Catherine II in the aftermath of the second Partition of Poland and sent to Saint Petersburg, where the books formed the mass of the Imperial Public Library on its formation in 1795. Parts of the collection were damaged or destroyed as they were mishandled while being removed from the library and transported to Russia, and many were stolen. According to the historian Joachim Lelewel, the Zaluskis' books, "could be bought at Grodno by the basket".

Because of that, when Poland regained her independence in 1918, there was no central institution to serve in the capacity of a national library. On 24 February 1928, by the decree of president Ignacy Mościcki, the National Library was created in its modern form. It was opened in 1930 and initially had 200 thousand volumes. Its first Director General was Stefan Demby, succeeded in 1934 by Stefan Vrtel-Wierczyński. The collections of the library were rapidly extended. For instance, in 1932 president Mościcki donated all of the books and manuscripts from the Wilanów Palace Museum to the library, some 40 thousand volumes and 20 thousand pictures from the collection of Stanisław Kostka Potocki.

Initially the National Library lacked a seat of its own. Because of that, the collections had to be accommodated in several places. The main reading room was located in the newly built library building of the Warsaw School of Economics. In 1935 the Potocki Palace in Warsaw became home for the special collections. A new, purpose-built building for the library was planned in what is now the Mokotów Field, in a planned monumental "Government District". However, its construction was hampered by the outbreak of World War II.

Before World War II, the library collections consisted of:

- 6.5 million books and journals from 19th and 20th centuries
- 3,000 early prints
- 2,200 incunables
- 52,000 manuscripts
- maps, icons and music

In 1940 the Nazi occupiers changed the National Library into Municipal Library of Warsaw and divided it as follows:

- Department of Books for Germans (located in the Warsaw University building)
- Restricted Department, containing books that were not available to readers (located in the then main seat of the library—the School of Economics)
- All special collections from various Warsaw offices and institutions (located in the Krasiński Library)

In 1944 the special collections were set ablaze by the Nazi occupiers as a part of repressions after the Warsaw Uprising. This caused the destruction of 80,000 early printed books, including priceless 16th–18th century Polonica, 26,000 manuscripts, 2,500 incunables, 100,000 drawings and engravings, 50,000 pieces of sheet music and theatre materials. It is estimated that out of over six million volumes in Warsaw's major libraries in 1939, 3.6 million volumes were lost during World War II, a large part of them belonging to the National Library.

== Collections ==
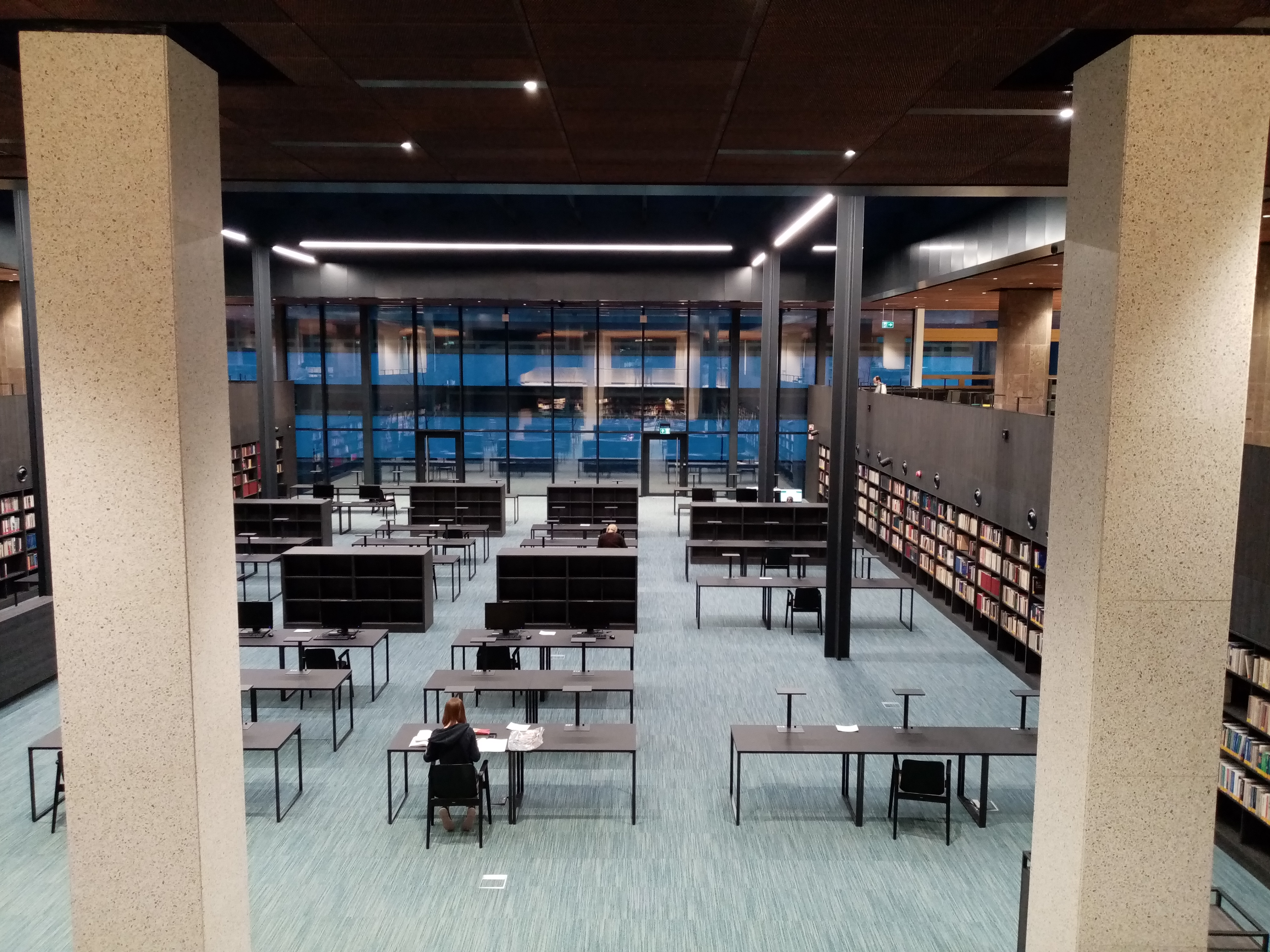
The reading hall

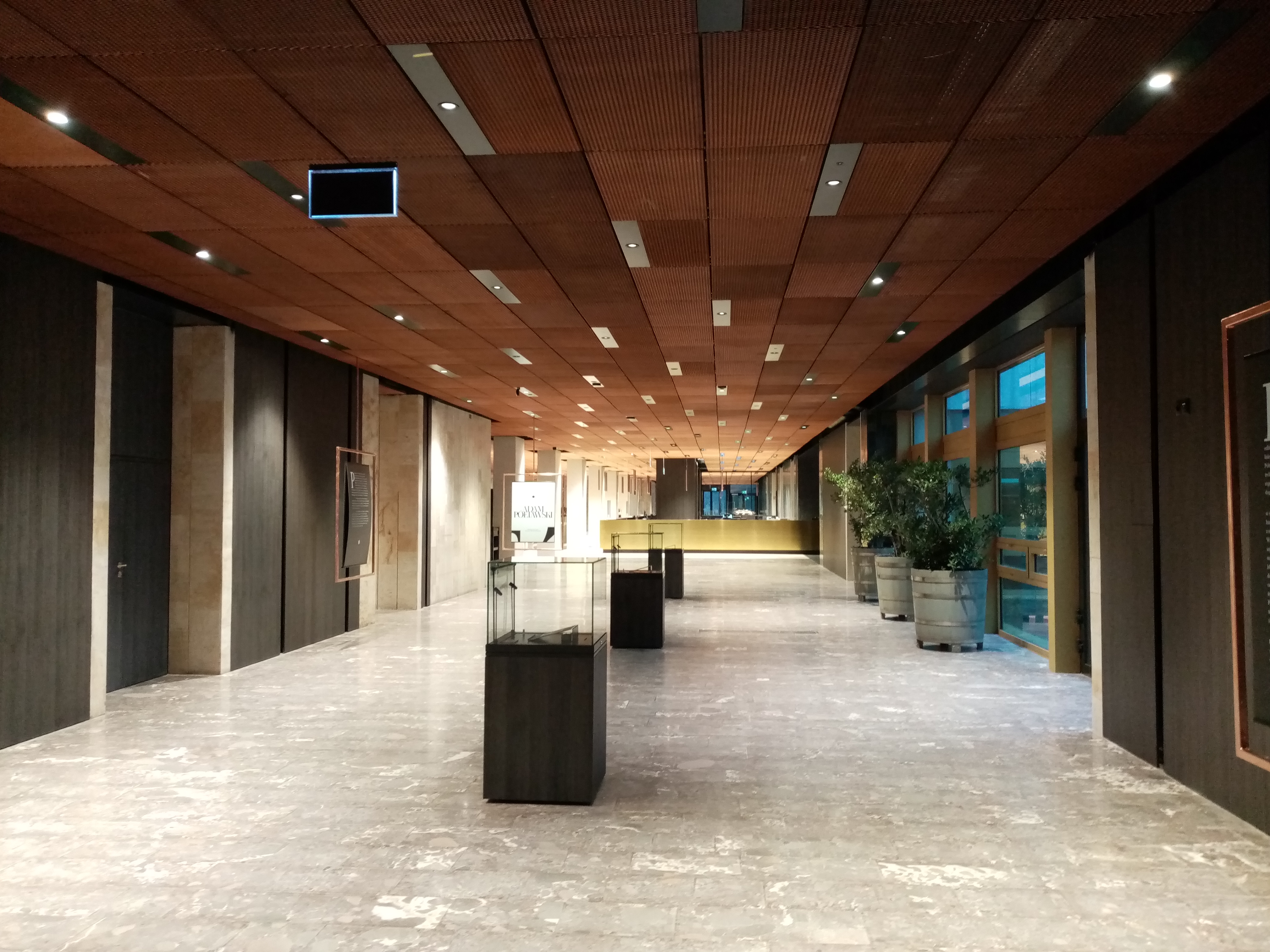
Entry hall

Today the collections of the National Library are one of the largest in the country and in the world. Among 7,900,000 volumes (2004) held in the library are 160,000 objects printed before 1801, over 26,000 manuscripts (including 6,887 music manuscripts), over 114,000 music prints and 400,000 drawings. The library collections also include photographs and other iconographic documents, more than 101,000 atlases and maps, over 2,000,000 ephemera, as well as over 2,000,000 books and about 800,000 copies of journals from the 19th to 21st centuries. Notable items in the collection include 151 leaves of the Codex Suprasliensis, which was inscribed in UNESCO's Memory of the World Programme Register in 2007 in recognition for its supranational and supraregional significance.

In 2012 the library signed an agreement to add 1.3 million Polish library records to WorldCat.

=== Illuminated Manuscripts ===
The Catalogue of the Archbishops of Gniezno and Lives of the Bishops of Cracow by Jan Długosz is a 16th-century manuscript illuminated by Stanislaw Samostrzelnik between 1531 and 1535. Today it resides in the collection of the National Library in Warsaw.

A selection of illuminated Breviary pages from various unknown miniaturists working in and around Paris, Bruges and Gent in the middle of the 15th century. A breviary (from Latin brevis, 'short' or 'concise') is a liturgical book of the Latin liturgical rites of the Catholic Church containing the public or canonical prayers, hymns, the Psalms, readings, and notations for everyday use, especially by bishops, priests, and deacons in the Divine Office.

The Illuminated Sketchbook of Stephan Schriber (1494).

=== Autographs Collection ===
Autographs are an important part of the library's collection. They include items from 19th-century romantic poets, 16th and 18th century philosophers, and many Nobel Prize-winning authors.

List of notable people from the collection:

- Henryk Sienkiewicz (novelist)
- Władysław Reymont (novelist)
- Adam Mickiewicz (poet)
- Juliusz Słowacki (poet)
- Cyprian Norwid (poet)
- Erasmus of Rotterdam (philosopher)
- Georg Wilhelm Hegel (philosopher)

=== Musical Documents ===
The National Library houses the Fryderyk Chopin manuscript collection, the largest collection of the composer's work. It also holds works from other important composers such as Józef Elsner, Karol Szymanowski, Grażyna Bacewicz, Witold Lutosławski and Krzysztof Komeda.

From May 2024, the most valuable objects from the collection of the National Library are presented at a permanent exhibition in the Palace of the Commonwealth.

== See also ==
- Digital Library of the National Library of Poland
- List of libraries damaged during the World War II
- List of libraries in Poland
- Ossolineum
- Załuski Library
