= List of libraries in Poland =

This is a list of libraries in Poland. As of 2015, there were around 8,050 public libraries and 1,001 research libraries in the country. In 2012 there were around 20,400 school libraries.

== Libraries by province ==
=== Greater Poland ===
- Kórnik Library
- Poznań University Library
- Raczyński Library, Poznan

=== Kuyavian–Pomeranian ===
- Nicolaus Copernicus University Library
- Voivodeship and Municipal Public Library, Bydgoszcz

=== Lesser Poland ===
- Czartoryski Library, Krakow
- Jagiellonian Library, Krakow

=== Łódź ===
As of 2012, there were some 549 public libraries and 1,306 school libraries in the Łódź Voivodeship.

- Łódź University of Technology Library

=== Lower Silesian ===
- Library of Wrocław University of Science and Technology (Polish: Biblioteka Politechniki Wrocławskiej)
- Ossolineum Library, Wroclaw

=== Lublin ===
As of 2012, there were some 590 public libraries and 1,433 school libraries in the Lublin Voivodeship.

- Maria Curie-Skłodowska University Library, Lublin

=== Lubusz ===
As of 2012, there were some 254 public libraries and 474 school libraries in the Lubusz Voivodeship.

- Norwid Library in Zielona Góra

=== Masovian ===
- Central Military Library, Warsaw
- Krasiński Library, Warsaw
- Main Judaic Library, Warsaw
- Main Library of Cardinal Stefan Wyszynski University, Warsaw
- Main Library, Warsaw University of Technology
- National Library of Poland, Warsaw
- University of Warsaw Library
- Warsaw Public Library – Central Library of the Masovian Voivodeship
- Załuski Library, Warsaw

=== Opole ===
As of 2012, there were some 317 public libraries and 576 school libraries in the Opole Voivodeship.

- Municipal Public Library in Opole

=== Podlaskie ===
As of 2012, there were some 240 public libraries and 650 school libraries in the Podlaskie Voivodeship.

- Ignacy Krasicki Przemyśl Public Library, housed in the building of the former New Synagogue (Przemyśl)
- Łukasz Górnicki Podlasie Library in Białystok

=== Pomeranian ===
- European Solidarity Centre, Gdansk
- Gdańsk University of Technology Library

=== Silesian ===
- Scientific Information Center and Academic Library (CINiBA), Katowice
- Silesian Library, Katowice

=== Subcarpathian ===
As of 2012, there were some 681 public libraries and 1,514 school libraries in the Subcarpathian Voivodeship.

- Provincial and Municipal Public Library in Rzeszów

=== Świętokrzyskie ===
As of 2012, there were some 275 public libraries and 797 school libraries in the Świętokrzyskie Voivodeship.

- University Library in Kielce

=== Warmian–Masurian ===
As of 2012, there were some 305 public libraries and 826 school libraries in the Warmian–Masurian Voivodeship.

- University of Warmia and Mazury in Olsztyn Library

=== West Pomeranian ===
As of 2012, there were some 373 public libraries and 766 school libraries in the West Pomeranian Voivodeship.

- Pomeranian Library, Szczecin

== Defunct ==
- Baworowscy Library, Lwow

== See also ==
- Legal deposit in Poland
- List of libraries damaged during World War II#Poland
- Mass media in Poland
- Open access in Poland
- Polish literature

in Polish

- Libraries in Poland (in Polish)
- Public libraries in Poland (in Polish)
- Federation of Digital Libraries, Poland (in Polish)
- List of state archives in Poland (in Polish)
